= Macross: Do You Remember Love? (video game) =

1997 video game

The Super Dimension Fortress Macross: Do You Remember Love?
- Sega Saturn cover art
- Developer: Scarab
- Publisher: Bandai Visual
- Producer: Tsutomu Fuzisawa
- Designer: Masanao Kita
- Programmer: Noboru Yanagisawa
- Series: Macross
- Platforms: Sega Saturn, PlayStation
- Release: Sega Saturn: JP: June 6, 1997; PlayStation: JP: May 27, 1999
- Genre: Shoot 'em up
- Mode: Single-player

The Super Dimension Fortress Macross: Do You Remember Love? (超時空要塞マクロス 愛・おぼえていますか, Chōjikū Yōsai Makurosu: Ai Oboete Imasu ka) is a 2D shoot 'em up adaptation of the 1984 anime film of the same title, released exclusively in Japan on the Sega Saturn in 1997, the Sony PlayStation in 1999 and the PlayStation 3 in 2012 (through digital download). The Saturn version was released to coincide with the 15th anniversary of the Macross franchise. Packaged in two CDs, the game features video footage of the original film plus all-new animated sequences.

== Gameplay ==
In the game, the player takes the control of main protagonist Hikaru Ichijyo, as he battles Zentradi units on each stage. The format of the game is a 2D side-scrolling shooter (like the original Macross game for the Nintendo Family Computer with also level design inspired by the Macross: Eternal Love Song game for the PC Engine CD). The player has two basic attacks: Gun Pod and micro-missiles. In addition, the VF-1 Valkyrie unit controlled by the player can transform into Fighter, Gerwalk and Battroid modes during battle.

== Plot ==
While the game is a close adaptation of the film, it has a number of differences:

- Unlike the film, the game begins off the coast of South Ataria Island, where Skull Squadron (led by Roy Focker) prepares to battle the invading Zentradi fleet. Just seconds after Skull Squadron takes off, the aircraft carrier Prometheus is sliced in half by a Zentradi laser fired from Earth's orbit. After the player finishes the first stage, all surviving Skull Squadron units fly toward the Macross, which executes a space fold out of Earth. The actual beginning of the film starts the second stage.
- A sortie where the Macross initiates an ARMD attack (an updated version of the Daedalus attack from the original series) on a Zentradi ship is added to the storyline.
- In the film, the VT-1D Super Ostrich flown by Hikaru and Minmay is unarmed when it is captured and taken to a Zentradi ship. In the game, during the stage where Hikaru and Misa make their escape from the ship, Hikaru is given a Gun Pod by Focker.
- During the final battle where Minmay sings "Do You Remember Love?", the broadcast of her song is disrupted by a jamming satellite deployed by Boddole Zer's fleet. The player must destroy the satellite in order to resume the song's broadcast.

== Development ==
Because voice actor Arihiro Hase died on July 30, 1996 - a year before this game was released, old recordings of his dialogue as Hikaru Ichijyo were reused in the intro scene.

There was a mail-in gift only for the first releases of the PlayStation version of the video game that offered one "what-if?" scenario. The gift was a music-playing card in the design of the crucial Protoculture music plate that Misa Hayase found in the movie. On this card was the purported last message from Lynn Minmay aboard the SDF-2 Megaroad-01 colonization ship before it disappeared, according to the official Macross continuity.

The new audio dialogue was recorded for the video game by singer/songwriter Mari Iijima, who played Minmay in both the Macross animated TV series and the movie adaptation. The message said that the ship was about to investigate a black hole at the center of the galaxy. However, given that this story comes from a not-for-sale extra for a game based on what is considered a "historical" dramatization within Macross, it is not the final word on Hikaru, Misa and Minmay fates according to series creator Shoji Kawamori.

== Reception ==
Next Generation reviewed the Saturn version of the game, rating it two stars out of five, and stated that "out of the two Macross/Robotech games currently released, Macross: DYRL is more enjoyable, but the emperor wears no clothes. Unless players look at it through nostalgia-colored glasses, this game is worth a matinee, but not full price".
