= Macross 30: Voices across the Galaxy =

2013 video game

- Developer: Artdink
- Publisher: Namco Bandai Games
- Designer: Shoji Kawamori
- Artists: Shoji Kawamori (Mecha); Hirotaka Marufuji (Character)
- Writer: Ukyō Kodachi
- Composer: kz (livetune)
- Series: Macross
- Platform: PlayStation 3
- Release: JP: February 28, 2013
- Genre: Action role-playing
- Mode: Single-player

Macross 30: Voices across the Galaxy (マクロス30 銀河を繋ぐ歌声, Makurosu 30: Ginga o tsunagu utagoe) is an action role-playing game for the PlayStation 3 developed by Artdink and published by Namco Bandai Games. The game commemorates the 30th anniversary of the Macross anime series created by Shoji Kawamori, featuring every series from the franchise. The game was released on February 28, 2013.

== Gameplay ==
The gameplay of Macross 30 inherits the same gameplay seen in previous Macross games. The game has two types of controls: the Type A modeled after the controls in such games as Macross Trial Frontier and Macross Last Frontier, and the Type B that allows the player to manually move the weapons lock-on cursor for pinpoint accuracy. The game's Easy setting (the lowest of the three difficulty levels) has an auto combat feature; when a novice toggles the feature on during the game, an AI will take over the controls and automatically fight the battle.

Being an action RPG, the main character allows to have interactivity with other characters and also make decisions.

== Story ==
The game is set in year 2060, 50 years after the Space War I conflict seen in the first Macross series and one year after the Vajra War seen in Macross Frontier. Above the planet Ouroboros in the far reaches of the galaxy, S.M.S. pilot Leon Sakaki is suddenly attacked by an unknown enemy and shot down in his YF-25 Prophecy. There, he is rescued by the heroine Aisha Blanchette, the young Zentradi head of S.M.S.'s branch on Ouroboros.

Due to the intermittent space-fold faults known as "Ouroboros Aurora," Leon cannot immediately return home. He decides to join Aisha in investigating the planet's ruins, and while on an underground survey, the two discover a sleeping girl named Mina Forte. Unknown to them, their fates will be crossed with the ones throughout space and time.

== Characters ==
=== The Super Dimension Fortress Macross ===
Hikaru Ichijyo
Voiced by: Kenji Nojima

Lynn Minmay
Voiced by: Mari Iijima

Misa Hayase
Voiced by: Mika Doi

Quamzin Kravshera
Voiced by: Kōsuke Meguro

=== Macross Plus ===
Isamu Alva Dyson
Voiced by: Takumi Yamazaki

Guld Goa Bowman
Voiced by: Unshō Ishizuka

Myung Fang Lone
Voiced by: Rica Fukami

Sharon Apple
Voiced by: Mako Hyōdō

=== Macross 7 ===
Basara Nekki
Voiced by: Nobutoshi Canna

Mylene Flare Jenius
Voiced by: Tomo Sakurai

Gamlin Kizaki
Voiced by: Takehito Koyasu

Maximilian Jenius
Voiced by: Shō Hayami

Milia Fallyna Jenius
Voiced by: Eri Takeda

=== Macross Zero ===
Shin Kudo
Voiced by: Kenichi Suzumura

Sara Nome
Voiced by: Sanae Kobayashi

Mao Nome
Voiced by: Yuuka Nanri

D.D. Ivanov
Voiced by: Ryūzaburō Ōtomo

Nora Polyansky
Voiced by: Minami Takayama

=== Macross Frontier ===
Alto Saotome
Voiced by: Yuichi Nakamura

Ranka Lee
Voiced by: Megumi Nakajima

Sheryl Nome
Voiced by: Aya Endō

Jeffery Wilder
Voiced by: Tōru Ōkawa

Ozma Lee
Voiced by: Katsuyuki Konishi

Michael Blanc
Voiced by: Hiroshi Kamiya

Luca Angelloni
Voiced by: Jun Fukuyama

Klan Klang
Voiced by: Megumi Toyoguchi

Brera Sterne
Voiced by: Sōichirō Hoshi

Grace O'Connor
Voiced by: Kikuko Inoue

Vajra

=== Original ===
Leon Sakaki
Voiced by: Miyu Irino

Mina Forte
Voiced by: Haruka Chisuga

Aisha Blanchette
Voiced by: Marina Inoue

Rod Baltmer
Voiced by: Mamoru Miyano

Ushio Todo
Voiced by: Jōji Nakata

Guinness Mordler
Voiced by: Hiroyuki Yoshino

May Leeron
Voiced by: Ayana Taketatsu

Mia Sakaki
Voiced by: Ayana Taketatsu

== Development ==
=== Hybrid Pack ===
Between 2010 and 2012, prior to the release of this full-length game, Bandai-Namco released three short Macross games (including PlayStation Trophies) bundled with their respective theatrical movie. These Blu-ray releases were marketed as "Hybrid Packs" for they contain both video data (as in a Blu-ray movie disc) and game data (as in a PlayStation 3 game disc). All three games were made by Artdink, the maker of Macross 30.

- 2010.10.07: Macross Trial Frontier (bundled with "Gekijoban Macross F: Utsuwari no Utahime")
- 2011.10.20: Macross Last Frontier (bundled with "Gekijoban Macross F: Sayonara no Tsubasa")
- 2012.07.26: 私の彼はパイロット2012 / My Boyfriend is a Pilot 2012 (bundled with "The Super Dimension Fortress Macross: Do You Remember Love")

In 2014, one year after the release of Macross 30, Bandai-Namco issued Gekijoban Macross F 30th d ShoodiSta b Box (劇場版マクロスF 30th dシュディスタb BOX), a 3-disc Blu-ray/DVD boxset including a dual-disc bundle of the two Macross F movies and also the fourth Macross hybrid disc. Disc 1: Gekijoban Macross F: Utsuwari no Utahime includes the 120-minute movie and extra video material (intro part). Disc 2: Gekijoban Macross F: Sayonara no Tsubasa includes the 115-minute movie and extra video material (ending "d ShoodiSta b" live movie). Disc 3: Project F Ultimate Hybrid Disc includes the 250-minute footage Macross F Video Historia (documentary, interview, TV commercial and promotional video) and the Macross Frontier The Movie Digital Archives which is a visual database using the PlayView PlayStation 3 application. In the DVD boxset, this third disc is titled Project F Ultimate Disc for it doesn't include the Macross Frontier The Movie Digital Archives.

- 2014.05.15: Macross Frontier The Movie Digital Archives (bundled with "Macross Video Historia").

=== Macross 30 ===
Macross 30 is first announced at the 2012 Tokyo Game Show as a secret project to commemorate the 30th anniversary of the series. The game itself according to Kawamori will include storylines from every Macross series he produced to create an original story. The teaser trailer is aired in the event and soon posted in the official Namco Bandai's official YouTube account. In the October issue of Famitsu, the developers revealed several characters and mecha from several Macross series including Superdimensional Fortress Macross, Macross 7, Macross Plus, Macross Zero and Macross Frontier. On December 19, 2012, Famitsu revealed an exclusive Variable Fighter to the game in the form of the YF-30 Chronos, designed by Kawamori himself. The unit is assigned to S.M.S. pilot Rion Sakaki. kz of the Vocaloid music band livetune will compose the game's opening and ending themes.

== Releases ==
As with the previous games, there is no plan to release Macross 30 outside Japan.

=== Limited Edition ===
A Special Limited Edition of the game has been released alongside the normal edition. The limited edition includes the game, A 30th anniversary booklet, character & mecha art book, set of event & campaign posters, layout pictures and a boxart designed by Hidetaka Tenjin.

=== PlayStation 3 the Best ===
On October 9, 2014, the regular edition has been rereleased in the Japanese budget edition "PlayStation 3 the Best".

== DLC ==
The Limited Edition and the normal edition were sold with PlayStation Store product codes allowing to download exclusive colors (skin) for up to three Valkyries.

The normal edition's product code allows to unlock a special marking version of the VF-29. It is possible to redeem the product code one time only, therefore the product code will likely be unavailable when purchasing a used copy of the game.

The Limited Edition includes the normal edition's product code plus an exclusive one allowing to unlock special marking version of the VF-25F and the VF-1S.

== Licensed merchandising ==
=== Soundtrack ===
On February 23, 2013, Japanese music label distributed by Victor Entertainment, Flying Dog, released a CD Single (VTCL-35147) including the opening and ending themes: "Planet Cradle" (プラネット・クレイドル) and "Wondering" (ワンダーリング) respectively. Vocals are performed by Japanese singer Haruka Chisuga (Mina Forte) while music is composed by kz (livetune).

=== Artbook ===
Through Famitsu/Enterbrain, the Japanese publisher Kadokawa has issued an official guidebook named Macross 30 -Voices across the Galaxy- Complete Visual Guide (ISBN 9784047289055).

=== Novel ===
Ukyo Kodachi published a novelization of the game named "マクロス30 銀河を繋ぐ歌声" which was issued in the Dengeki Hobby Books collection of Ascii Media Works (ISBN 9784048915823).

== Reception ==
Kotaku wrote: "It is an improvement over the past six Macross games in every possible way and is quite simply the best Macross game made to date." Famitsu gave the game a score of 32 out of 40.
