= Super Dimension Fortress Macross: Scrambled Valkyrie =

1993 video game

- Japanese box art
- Developer: Winkysoft
- Publisher: Zamuse
- Series: Macross
- Platform: Super Famicom
- Release: JP: October 29, 1993
- Genre: Shoot 'em up
- Mode: Single-player

Chō Jikū Yōsai Macross: Scrambled Valkyrie (超時空要塞マクロス -スクランブルヴァルキリー-) is a 1993 shmup video game for the Super Famicom, developed by Winky Soft and published by Zamuse.

It is part of the "Parallel World" timeline based on Macross: Do You Remember Love, which also includes the video games Macross 2036 and Macross: Eien no Love Song, and the OVA Macross II. The events of Scrambled Valkyrie take place some time after Do You Remember Love (2010) but before the launch of the SDF-2 Megaroad-01 as depicted in Macross: Flash Back 2012 (2012).

== Gameplay ==
Gameplay screenshot.

Players have three playable characters to choose from: Hikaru Ichijyo, Maximilian Jenius, and Milia Fallyna Jenius. The character the player chooses affects the color markings of the VF-1 Valkyrie variable fighter, as well as the type of weapon fired while in Fighter, GERWALK and Battroid modes. During the transformation between these modes, the player is briefly invulnerable to most attacks.

Each of the Fighter, GERWALK and Battroid modes has three power-up levels, which can be increased by collecting an object with a P on it that gives the vocal "Maximum Power" and is released upon defeating an enemy (usually either a mini-boss or a red-colored smaller enemy). Score bonuses, 1-UP bonuses and shield bonuses are other available powerups.

Being hit by an enemy not only takes away shield power, but also reduces the currently selected weapon's power by one level. There are no "lives"—continues must be used to return to the start of each of the seven levels after the variable fighter's shield runs out and is destroyed.

In addition to the different types of weapons available, the player, regardless of playable character choice, has a weapon dubbed the "Minmay cannon". If the player does not fire their weapon for some time, their fighter will glow. Touching certain enemies while glowing allows them to join the player as an invincible ally, who will attack the player's enemies.

== Music ==
Music remixed in the game's soundtrack includes themes from the original 1982 TV series and its 1984 movie adaptation.

== Reception ==
Reception

Review scores
Publication	Score
Computer and Video Games	89/100
Famitsu	21/40
Jeuxvideo.com	16/20
Nintendo Life	9/10
Super Play	87%
Hippon Super!	6/10
Super Action	75%

Award
Publication	Award
Electronic Gaming Monthly (1994)	Best Japanese Shooter

Super Dimension Fortress Macross: Scrambled Valkyrie was awarded "Best Japanese Shooter" of 1994 by Electronic Gaming Monthly.
