= The Super Dimension Fortress Macross (1985 video game) =

- Original Japanese box art.
- Developer: Namco
- Publishers: Namco; Bandai
- Series: Macross
- Platform: Family Computer
- Release: JP: December 10, 1985
- Genres: Shoot 'em up Action
- Mode: Single-player

Super Dimension Fortress Macross (超時空要塞マクロス, Chō Jikū Yōsai Macross) is a side-scrolling shooter video game released by Namco for the Famicom in 1985. Based on the popular anime television series of the same name, the player controls a transformable VF-1 Valkyrie variable fighter in an unending battle against an invading race of giant humanoid aliens known as the Zentradi.

It is one of the earliest known collaborations between Namco and Bandai, both of which would eventually merge into Bandai Namco Entertainment in 2005.

== Gameplay ==
The gameplay is a very basic and fairly standard form of the recognizable style that has become part of the shoot-em-up genre over the years. The player's task is to blast their way through wave after wave of enemy battlepods, power armors and ships until they reach the Zentradi mothership. Inside it, there is only thirty seconds to reach the central reactor, destroy the outer wall and shoot the core. The mission ends and then begins all over again on an infinite loop.

An in-game screenshot of The Super Dimension Fortress Macross.

The player's VF-1 Valkyrie can be transformed into three modes: Gerwalk, Battroid and fighter. This adds to the gameplay as the Gerwalk and Battroid modes serve to progressively slow down the horizontal scrolling and make the game less difficult. However they also move slower. The controller's B button fires the Gun Pod while the A button - in conjunction with the movement of the D-pad - engages the transformation mode. A limited number of micro-missiles can be fired by pressing the Select button.

== Music ==
The game's main background music is an 8-bit version of the Lynn Minmay song "Shao Pai Long" ("Little White Dragon"), which was featured in both the original 1982 TV series and its 1984 movie adaptation.
