= Shōji Kawamori =

Japanese artist and designer

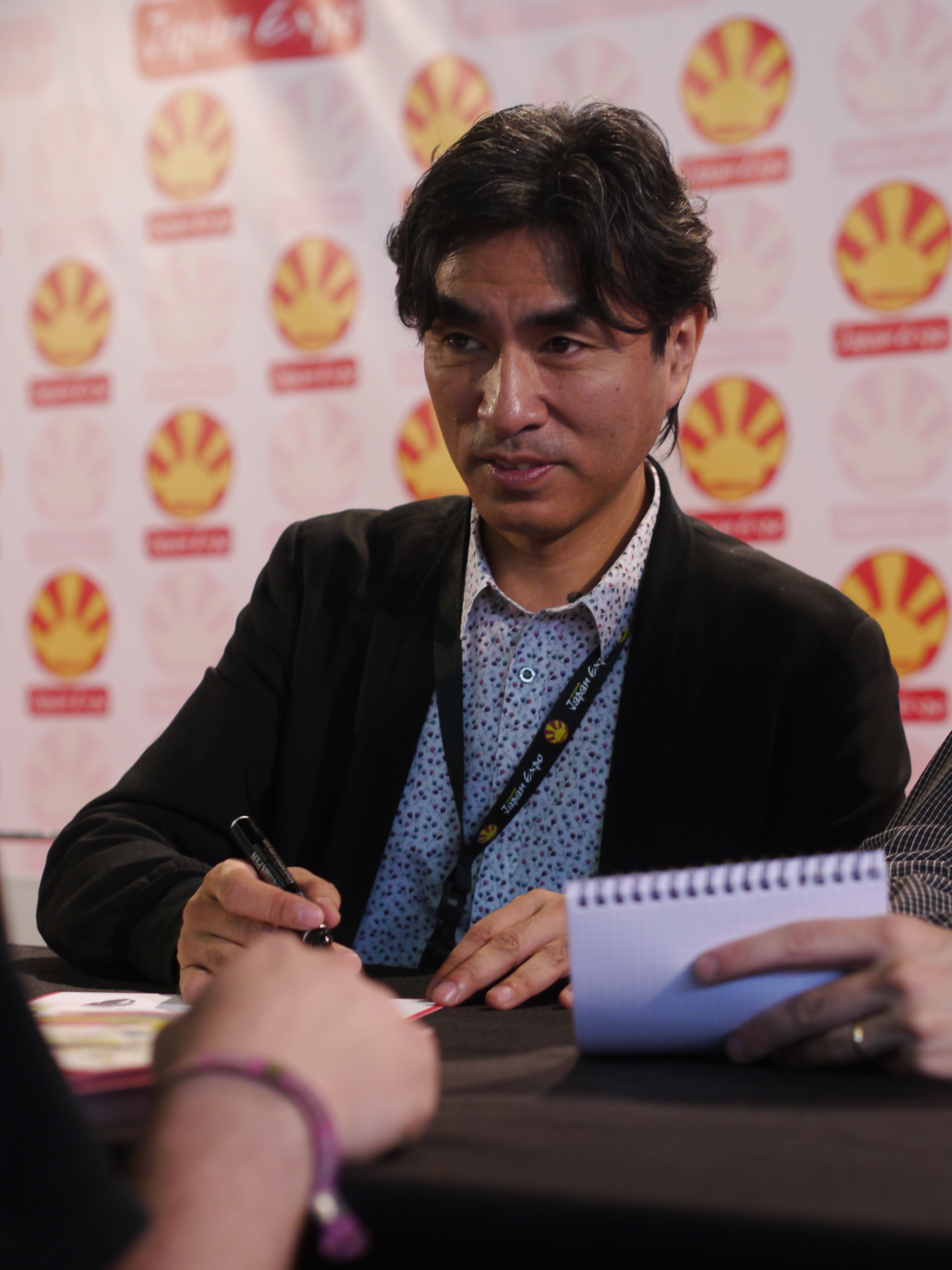
- Taken during the 14th edition of Japan Expo in 2013 organised at the 'Parc de expositions of Villepinte near Paris in France
- Born: February 20, 1960 (age 66); Toyama City, Japan
- Other name: Eiji Kurokawa
- Occupations: Anime creator Producer; Screenwriter; Visual artist Mecha designer
- Employer: Satelight
- Known for: Macross; Diaclone; The Vision of Escaflowne; Super Dimension Fortress Macross; Transformers toyline

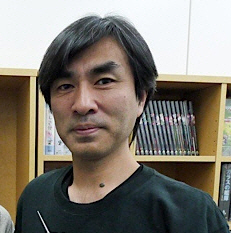
Shōji Kawamori in his studio, in May 2011

Shōji Kawamori (河森 正治, Kawamori Shōji; born February 20, 1960) is a Japanese animator, producer, screenwriter, visual artist, and mecha designer. He is best known for creating the Macross mecha animated franchise and the Diaclone toyline, which were in turn the basis for the Robotech and Transformers franchises, respectively. He is also known for creating The Vision of Escaflowne anime series. He pioneered several innovative concepts in his works, such as transforming mecha (including the VF-1 Valkyrie in Macross and Optimus Prime in Transformers) and virtual idols (including Lynn Minmay and Sharon Apple in the Macross franchise). His work has had a significant impact on popular culture, both in Japan and internationally.

== Personal life ==
Shoji Kawamori was born in Toyama, Japan in 1960. Later in his youth he attended Keio University in the late seventies and in the same years as Macross screenwriter Hiroshi Ōnogi and character designer Haruhiko Mikimoto, where they became friends and founded a Mobile Suit Gundam fan club called "Gunsight One", a name the group would use years later during the development of the fictional world of the Macross series.

Kawamori jokingly claimed that his preference from designing mecha stemmed from his experience of playing with Fischertechnik construction blocks given to him by his father during his youth. The prohibitive expensiveness of the toys left him with a limited supply of blocks, which encouraged him to take advantage of their numerous articulation points to create individual designs with multiple variations.

== Career ==
=== Anime creation, production, and promotion ===
Shoji Kawamori started his anime career as a teenage intern at Studio Nue, working as an assistant artist and animator during the late seventies and early eighties. He occasionally used the alias Eiji Kurokawa (黒河影次 Kurokawa Eiji) in his early work. Later in his career Kawamori created or co-created the concepts which served as basis for several anime series such as Super Dimension Fortress Macross, The Vision of Escaflowne, Earth Maiden Arjuna, Genesis of Aquarion, Macross 7, Macross Frontier, and Macross Delta. His projects are usually noted to contain strong themes of love, war, spirituality or mysticism, and ecological concern. Kawamori is currently executive director at the animation studio Satelight.

Kawamori is the current president of the Anime Tourism Association, an organization dedicated to promoting tourism to Japan driven by interest in anime and manga. He was appointed to the position on October 8, 2024, succeeding Gundam creator Yoshiyuki Tomino, who had previously held the position since ATA's foundation in 2016.

=== Mecha design ===
Shoji Kawamori is a visual artist and a mecha designer – projects featuring his designs range from 1983's Crusher Joe to 2005's Eureka Seven. Also, each and every variable fighter from the official Macross series continuity has been designed by him.

Kawamori's design aesthetics and philosophy drew inspiration from childhood interests, particularly the works of Giorgetto Giugiaro (designer of the Isuzu 117 Coupé and DMC DeLorean), the fictional machines and vehicles featured in the original Thunderbirds series, and the designs of real-life aircraft and spacecraft such as the North American XB-70 Valkyrie and the modules of the Apollo program. The Isuzu 117 specifically cemented Kawamori's belief that a designer has influence over the final product.

Kawamori also helped to design various toys for the Takara toyline Diaclone in the early 1980s, many of which were later incorporated into Hasbro's Transformers toyline. Quite a few of them became iconic Transformers: Generation 1 toy designs. Among them the first Optimus Prime ("Convoy") toy design, Prowl, Bluestreak, Smokescreen, Ironhide, and Ratchet. In 2006, he designed both the Hybrid Style Convoy and the Masterpiece version of Starscream for Takara.

One of his key mech design innovations was transforming mecha, which can transform between a standard vehicle (such as a fighter plane or transport truck) and a fighting mecha robot. Kawamori came up with the idea of transforming mechs while working on the Diaclone and Macross franchises in the early 1980s (such as the VF-1 Valkyrie in Macross and Robotech), with his Diaclone mechs later providing the basis for Transformers. Some of Kawamori's most iconic transforming mecha designs include the VF-1 Valkyrie from the Macross and Robotech franchises, and Optimus Prime (called Convoy in Japan) from the Transformers and Diaclone franchises.

In 2001, he brought his mecha design talent to real-life projects when he designed a variant of the Sony AIBO robotic dog, the ERS-220.

== Legacy ==
Kawamori came up with several innovative concepts and helped create several franchises which had a significant impact on popular culture, both in Japan and internationally. One of his original ideas was the transforming mecha, which can transform between a standard vehicle (such as a fighter plane or transport truck) and a fighting mecha robot. He introduced the concept with Diaclone in 1980 and Macross in 1982, with some of his most iconic transforming mecha including the VF-1 Valkyrie from Macross (later adapted into Robotech in 1985) and Convoy from the 1983 Diaclone line (later called Optimus Prime in Transformers). The concept later became more popular in the mid-1980s, with Macross: Do You Remember Love? (1984) and Zeta Gundam (1985) in Japan, and with Robotech (1985 adaptation of Macross) and Transformers (1986 adaptation of Diaclone) in the West. In turn, Macross and Zeta Gundam became influential in Japan, while Robotech and Transformers became influential in the West, with Robotech helping to introduce anime to North America and Transformers influencing the Hollywood movie industry.

In addition to his innovative mecha design work, Kawamori also came up with innovative concepts in his character writing. In contrast to earlier mecha anime which focused on combatants, he wanted to portray a mecha conflict from the perspective of non-combatant civilians, which led to his creation of the fictional singer Lynn Minmay in Macross. She went on to become the first virtual idol. Voiced by Mari Iijima, Minmay was the first fictional idol singer to garner major real-world success, with the theme song "Do You Remember Love?" (from the film Macross: Do You Remember Love?) reaching number seven on the Oricon music charts in Japan. Kawamori later took the concept further in Macross Plus (1994) with the virtual idol Sharon Apple, an artificial intelligence (AI) computer program who takes the form of an intergalactic pop star. The same year, he created Macross 7 (1994), which featured the virtual band Fire Bomber who became a commercial success and spawned multiple CDs released in Japan. The Macross franchise set the template for later virtual idols in the early 21st century, such as Hatsune Miku and Kizuna AI.

Another innovative character concept he came up with was the role of Misa Hayase in Macross (called Lisa Hayes in Robotech), who was one of the main commanders of the Macross battleship. She was the boss and commanding officer of the fighter pilot protagonist Hikaru Ichijyo (called Rick Hunter in Robotech), and later his love interest. This was a scenario Kawamori came up with which he had not seen in any Hollywood movies before. A similar scenario, however, later appeared in the Hollywood movie Top Gun (1986). According to Kawamori, "Many people pointed out that later films like Top Gun copied that idea and setting, as well as including the combination of many songs and fighters too."

== Works ==
=== Anime ===
==== Macross series ====
- The Super Dimension Fortress Macross – Original Series Concept Creator, Production Supervisor, Mechanical Designer
- Macross: Do You Remember Love? – Movie Concept Creator, Director, Mechanical Designer, Series Script Supervisor, Movie Story
- The Super Dimension Fortress Macross: Flash Back 2012 – Executive Director, Compilation, Mechanical Designer
- Macross Plus – Creator, Executive Director, Writer, Mechanical Design
- Macross 7 – Creator, Writer, Supervisor, Mechanical Designer
- Macross Dynamite 7 – Creator, Series Script Supervisor, Mechanical Designer, Ending Photography
- Macross Zero – Creator, Director, Writer, Mechanical Designer
- Macross Frontier – Creator, Supervising Director, Story Composition, Mechanical Designer
- Macross FB 7: Ore no Uta o Kike! – Original Creator, Valkyrie Design
- Macross Delta – Creator, Main Director, Writer, Valkyrie Mechanical Designer

Note: Macross II is the only animated Macross project in which Kawamori had no involvement.

==== Other anime ====
- Space Battleship Yamato series – Spaceship Mechanical Design (Uncredited)
- Future GPX Cyber Formula – Machine Design
- Future GPX Cyber Formula SIN – Machine Design
- The Vision of Escaflowne – Original Creator, Series Script Supervisor
- Spring and Chaos – Director, Screenplay
- Earth Maiden Arjuna – Original Creator, Director, Series Script Supervisor
- The Family's Defensive Alliance – Original Creator, Series Planner
- Genesis of Aquarion – Original Creator, Director, Series Script Supervisor, Aquarion Design
- Genesis of Aquarion (OVA) – Director, Series Composition, Original Creator
- Aquarion Evol – Original Creator, Director, Series Script Supervisor, Aquarion Design
- Aquarion: Myth of Emotions – Original Creator, Supervisor, Aquarion Design
- Patlabor: The Movie – Mechanical Design (Credited as Masaharu Kawamori)
- Patlabor 2: The Movie – Mechanical Design (Credited as Masaharu Kawamori)
- WXIII: Patlabor the Movie 3 – Mechanical Design
- Eureka Seven – Main Mechanic Design
- Eureka Seven: AO – Nirvash Design
- Engage Planet Kiss Dum – Main Mechanical Design
- Kishin Taisen Gigantic Formula – Mechanical designer (Junova-VIII)
- Labyrinth – Director
- Mobile Suit Gundam 0083: Stardust Memory – Designed the RX-78GP01 "Zephyranthes" and the RX-78GP02A "Physalis" Gundams
- Ulysses 31 – Mechanical Design
- Dangaioh – Mechanical Design, key animation
- Ghost in the Shell – Mechanical Design
- Basquash! – Original Concept, Project Director
- Outlaw Star – Designed the ship XGP15A-II
- Tōshō Daimos – Guest Mechanical Designer
- Gordian Warrior – Guest Mechanical Designer
- Golden Warrior Gold Lightan – Guest Mechanical Designer
- Anyamaru Tantei Kiruminzuu – Original Creator
- AKB0048 – Original Creator, Director, Mechanical Design
- Ani*Kuri15 – Director (ep. 4)
- Robotech – Adapted from Macross
- Cowboy Bebop – Script (ep. 18), Stage Setting Cooperation
- Glass Fleet – Mechanical Design
- M3: Sono Kuroki Hagane – Mechanical Design
- Nobunaga the Fool – Original Creator
- Last Hope – Original Creator, Director
- Noein – Storyboard (ep. 20)
- RahXephon – Storyboard (ep. 9)
- Techno Police 21C – Action Choreography Assistance and Mechanical Design
- The Ultraman – Mechanical Design

=== Video games ===
- Ace Combat Assault Horizon – Guest Designer
- Armored Core – Mechanic Designer
- Armored Core: Project Phantasma – Mechanic Designer
- Armored Core: Master of Arena – Mechanic Designer
- Armored Core 2 – Mechanic Concept Designer
- Armored Core 2: Another Age – Mechanic Concept Designer
- Armored Core 3 – Mechanic Concept Designer
- Silent Line: Armored Core – Guest Designer
- Armored Core: Nexus – Mechanic Concept Designer
- Armored Core: For Answer – Mechanic Concept Designer
- Eureka Seven vol. 1: The New Wave – Main Mechanical Designer
- Eureka Seven vol. 2: The New Vision – Main Mechanical Designer
- MechWarrior 3050 – Cover Art (Japanese Version)
- Omega Boost – Mechanical Design Advisor, Supervisor, Mechanical/Costume Designer, Opening/Ending Movie Director
- Tech Romancer – Mechanical Design, Original Concept
- Macross 30: The Voice that Connects the Galaxy – Supervisor, Mechanical Designer, Animated Sequences Director
- Daemon X Machina – Mechanic Designer
- Devil May Cry 5 – Designed the robotic arms, "Devil Breakers", found throughout the game. Gerbera GP01 was designed with Shoji Kawamori's past works in mind as inspiration.
- Call of Duty: Mobile – Designed the Reaper skin, titled "Ashura".
- Super Mecha Champions – Designed Playable Mecha "Pulsar"
- Armored Core VI: Fires of Rubicon – Mechanical Designer
- The Alchemist Code – Animation Director

=== Other work ===
- Diaclone (1980-1982, toyline) – Mecha design
- Transformers (1984, 2006, toyline) – Adapted from Diaclone, mecha design
- Gunhed (1989, live action film) – Mechanical Design
- The Vision of Escaflowne (1994, manga) – Writer
- Thunderbirds Are Go (2015, animated TV series) – Mechanical Design
