= Arihiro Hase =

Japanese voice actor (1965–1996)

- 長谷 有洋
- Born: April 22, 1965; Tokyo, Japan
- Died: July 30, 1996 (aged 31)
- Occupations: Actor; voice actor
- Years active: 1982–1996
- Agent: Sigma Club (last affiliation)
- Notable work: The Super Dimension Fortress Macross as Hikaru Ichijyo

Arihiro Hase (長谷 有洋, Hase Arihiro; April 22, 1965 – July 30, 1996) was a Japanese actor who specialized in voice acting.

== Life and career ==
Arihiro Hase was the son of Sanji Hase and was formerly affiliated with Production M-3; he was attached to Sigma Club at the time of his death. Hase is best known for voicing Hikaru Ichijyo in the Macross series, a part he got when he was only 17 years old in high school.

Hase was a close friend of fellow Macross actress and singer Mari Iijima after the series ended and frequently attended her concerts until his death.

== Death ==
On July 30, 1996, at approximately 4:00 A.M., Hase jumped from his apartment's window seven stories to the ground. Sanji confirmed in TV interviews that his son's death was ruled a suicide; he was 31 years old. Following his death, recordings of his voice as Hikaru were reused in the video game adaptation of Macross: Do You Remember Love?.

In 2005, Iijima reprised her role of Lynn Minmay for the ADV Films English dub release of Macross, and in interviews has stated that she is dedicating this new release to him.

== Selected filmography ==
=== Anime ===
- The Super Dimension Fortress Macross (1982) - Hikaru Ichijyo
- The Super Dimension Fortress Macross: Do You Remember Love? (1984) - Hikaru Ichijyo
- Super Dimension Cavalry Southern Cross (1984) - Bowie Emerson
- The Super Dimension Fortress Macross: Flash Back 2012 (1987) - Hikaru Ichijyo
- Macross 7 (1994) - Bobby Lacoste

=== Video games ===
- Chō Jikū Yōsai Macross: Ai Oboete Imasu ka (1997) - Hikaru Ichijyo
