= Baby Birth =

Japanese manga series

- Cover of Baby Birth volume 1 as published by Tokyopop
- Genre: Adventure, Fantasy
- Manga
- Written by: Sukehiro Tomita
- Illustrated by: Haruhiko Mikimoto
- Published by: Kodansha
- English publisher: NA: Tokyopop
- Magazine: Magazine Z
- Original run: May 2001 – August 2002
- Volumes: 2

Baby Birth is a two-volume manga series written by Sukehiro Tomita and illustrated by Haruhiko Mikimoto.

== Story ==
Hizuru Oborozuki is a student of the TIAA, a prestigious arts school in Tokyo, and the local ace of ice skating, though she doesn't train much. Takuya Hijo is a young composer who has written a melody for the competition Hizuru's going to take part in.

His music awakens in her a new energy. Takuya reveals that they are the only two descendants of Teous, who in ancient times sealed a race of demons, the "Suspicion", who are now free and back on earth. Through Takuya's music Hizuru transforms into a beautiful warrior, ready to fight to protect the world.
