= No Limit (Mari Iijima album) =

Studio album by Mari Iijima
- Released: 1999
- Genre: Pop
- Length: 41:38
- Label: Independent
- Producer: Mari Iijima, James Studer

No Limit is a pop album by Japanese singer and songwriter Mari Iijima. It was both her first English language album and first independent release. Iijima’s former recording label, Warner Music Japan, distributed the album as an independent album in Japan. She received a nomination for Best Pop Artist at the Los Angeles Music Awards in 2000 for No Limit.

Iijima's then-husband, James Studer, was a producer for No Limit. The couple divorced in 2001.

== Track listing ==
1. “Us” - 4:12
2. “Everybody’s Lonely” - 4:14
3. “No Limit” - 4:23
4. “Stop Keeping in Touch” - 3:19
5. “More Than Yesterday” - 3:23
6. “Sudden Kiss” - 4:38
7. “”D”” - 4:59
8. “Irony of Fate” - 4:30
9. “For a Little While” - 3:54
10. “Vacation” - 4:01
