= Haruhiko Mikimoto =

Japanese artist (born 1959)

- 美樹本 晴彦
- Born: Haruhiko Satō (佐藤晴彦, Satō Haruhiko); August 28, 1959 (age 66); Tokyo, Japan
- Occupations: Anime character designer, illustrator and manga artist

Haruhiko Mikimoto (美樹本 晴彦, Mikimoto Haruhiko; born Haruhiko Satō (佐藤晴彦, Satō Haruhiko), August 28, 1959, in Tokyo, Japan) is a Japanese anime character designer, illustrator and manga artist. Mostly active during the 1980s, during that decade he rose to prominence and is considered one of the top character designers of his time.

He graduated from Keio University, and attended the university in the same years as Macross creator Shōji Kawamori and screenwriter Hiroshi Ōnogi. He joined the animation studio Artland while attending school, and was character designer in several anime series, including The Super Dimension Fortress Macross, Macross 7, Gunbuster and Kabaneri of the Iron Fortress.

== Anime works ==
Listed in alphabetical order.

- Aquarian Age the Movie (character designer)
- Astro Boy (1980 TV series) (in-between animation, key animation)
- Blue Remains (character designer)
- Delpower X Bakuhatsu Miracle Genki! (Character Design)
- Gandalla: King of the Burning Desert (character designer)
- Gunbuster (character designer)
- Gundam Neo Experience 0087: Green Divers (character designer),
- Hi-Speed Jecy (character designer)
- Kabaneri of the Iron Fortress (original character designer)
- Macross 7 (character designer, Ending Animation)
  - Macross 7: The Galaxy's Calling Me! (character designer)
  - Macross Dynamite 7 (character designer)
- Megazone 23 (guest character designer (Eve Tokimatsuri))
  - Megazone 23, Part II (guest character designer (Eve Tokimatsuri))
  - Megazone 23, Part III (guest character designer (Eve Tokimatsuri))
- Mobile Suit Gundam 0080: War in the Pocket (character designer)
- Rayca (character designer)
- Salamander (character designer)
- Super Dimension Century Orguss (character designer, animation director)
  - Super Dimension Century Orguss 02 (character designer)
- Talking Head (film) (character design)
- The Super Dimension Fortress Macross (character designer, character animation director)
  - Macross: Do You Remember Love? (character designer, animation director)
  - The Super Dimension Fortress Macross: Flash Back 2012 (character designer, animation director)
- Super Dimensional Fortress Macross II: Lovers Again (character designer)
- Tottoi (Character Design)
- Tōi Umi kara Kita Coo (Character Design)
- Tytania (Character Designer)

== Games ==
- Aisle Lord -- Mega-CD (character designer)
- Dogu Senki -- Dreamcast (character designer)
- Final Zone -- Mega Drive (character designer)
- The Super Dimension Fortress Macross: Scrambled Valkyrie -- Super Famicom (character designer)
- Khamrai -- PlayStation (character designer)
- Macross VF-X—PlayStation (character designer)
  - Macross VF-X2—PlayStation (character designer)
- Quo Vadis -- Sega Saturn, PlayStation (character designer)
  - Quovadis 2—Sega Saturn (character designer)
- Record of Lodoss War: Advent of Kardis—Dreamcast (cover illustration)
- A Sherd of Youthful Memories—PlayStation (character designer)
- The Super Dimension Fortress Macross: Do You Remember Love? (game)—Sega Saturn, PlayStation (character designer)
- Top o Nerae!—PlayStation 2 (character designer)
- The Super Dimension Fortress Macross (game) -- PlayStation 2 (character designer)
- Macross Ace Frontier -- PlayStation Portable (character designer)

== Artbooks and collections ==
Listed in alphabetic order. ISBN is for Japanese release unless otherwise noted.

- Elverz, ISBN 4-8291-9107-4
- Haruhiko Mikimoto Illustrations
  - ISBN 0-945814-52-6 (USA, hardcover)
  - ISBN 0-945814-51-8 (USA, softcover)
- Hoshi no Kismet, ISBN 4-253-01066-0
- Innocence, ISBN 4-04-853663-X
- It's Artland, ISBN 4-88144-032-2
- Michinoku Gashū, ISBN 4-19-669538-8
- Mikimoto Haruhiko Cel Works, ISBN 4-19-669607-4
- Movement, ISBN 4-8291-9102-3
- My Time, ISBN 4-8291-9112-0
- Quo Vadis Visual Book, ISBN 4-575-28720-2
- Roman Album Series Haruhiko Mikimoto Illustrations
- A Sherd of Youthful Memories Deep File, ISBN 4-901159-00-3
- A Sherd of Youthful Memories Visual Works, ISBN 4-87709-359-1
- This Is Animation: Chō Jikū Yōsai Macross Character-hen, ISBN 4-09-199521-7
- Visualist Series: Haruhiko Mikimoto Collection (laserdisc, VHS, and CD-ROM)

== Illustration works ==
Listed in alphabetic order. ISBN is for Japanese release unless otherwise noted.

- Baby Birth (illustrator, manga written by Sukehiro Tomita)
  - vol.1, ISBN 4-06-349061-0 (Japan), ISBN 1-59182-372-2 (USA)
  - vol.2, ISBN 4-06-349102-1 (Japan), ISBN 1-59182-373-0 (USA)
- Chō Jikū Seiki Orguss 02
  - vol.1, ISBN 4-09-440193-8
  - vol.2, ISBN 4-09-440194-6
  - vol.3, ISBN 4-09-440195-4
  - vol.4, ISBN 4-09-440196-2
- Chō Jikū Yōsai Macross TV-ban Anime Novels vol.1, ISBN 4-09-198001-5 (cover, illustrator, novel by Toshiki Inoue)
- Ecole Du Ciel
  - vol.1 (cover, inside illustration, novel by Kenichi Nakahara), ISBN 4-04-429801-7
  - vol.2 (cover, inside illustration, novel by Kenichi Nakahara), ISBN 4-04-429802-5
- Gekijoban Chō Jikū Yōsai Macross: Ai Oboete Imasu ka, ISBN 4-09-440004-4 (cover, illustrator, novel by Sukehiro Tomita)
- Gekijoban Chō Jikū Yōsai Macross 2
  - vol.1, ISBN 4-09-440011-7
  - vol.2, ISBN 4-09-440012-5
  - vol.3, ISBN 4-09-440013-3
  - vol.4, ISBN 4-09-440014-1
  - vol.5, ISBN 4-09-440015-X
- Gunbuster Perfect Guide (character designer)
- Hakkenden (cover, illustrator)
  - vol.1, ISBN 4-09-440261-6
  - vol.2, ISBN 4-09-440262-4
  - vol.3, ISBN 4-09-440263-2
- Hayase Misa: Shiroi Tsuioku, ISBN 4-19-669519-1 (illustrator, novel by Hiroshi Ohnogi)
- Live of Legend: Lynn Minmay/Mylene Jenius (character designer)
- Marginal Masters
  - vol.1, ISBN 4-19-669615-5
  - vol.2, ISBN 4-19-669635-X
  - vol.3, ISBN 4-19-669639-2
- My Inference And Her Reason, ISBN 4-04-428001-0 (cover, novel by Tsuguya Murase)
- Mysterious Warrior Thief T.T. (cover, illustrator, novels by Eiichiro Saito)
  - vol.1, ISBN 4-04-164701-0
  - vol.3, ISBN 4-04-164703-7
  - vol.4, ISBN 4-04-164704-5
- New Record of Lodoss War, (Introduction) ISBN 4-04-460426-6 (cover, inside illustrations, novels by Ryo Mizuno)
  - vol.1, ISBN 4-04-460424-X
  - vol.2, ISBN 4-04-460423-1
  - vol.3, ISBN 4-04-460425-8
  - vol.4, ISBN 4-04-460428-2
  - vol.5, ISBN 4-04-460429-0
  - vol.6, ISBN 4-04-460430-4
- Oboete Imasu ka: Eiga "Chō Jikū Yōsai Macross" yori, ISBN 4-19-669544-2 (cover, illustrator)
- Seishun! Tonari-gumi: Kimi to Hanashitai, ISBN 4-19-669585-X (cover, illustrator)
- Titania (cover, illustrator, novels by Yoshiki Tanaka)
  - vol.1, ISBN 4-19-153817-9
  - vol.2, ISBN 4-19-154060-2
  - vol.3, ISBN 4-7575-1135-3
- Tōsō no Eden, ISBN 4-19-669593-0 (illustrator)

== Manga ==
Listed in alphabetic order. ISBN is for Japanese release unless otherwise noted.

- Cherish, ISBN 4-04-852489-5
- Macross 7: Trash
  - vol.1, ISBN 4-04-713105-9
  - vol.2, ISBN 4-04-713122-9
  - vol.3, ISBN 4-04-713142-3
  - vol.4, ISBN 4-04-713183-0
  - vol.5, ISBN 4-04-713198-9
  - vol.6, ISBN 4-04-713230-6
  - vol.7, ISBN 4-04-713293-4
  - vol.8, ISBN 4-04-713397-3
- Marionette Generation
  - vol.1, ISBN 4-04-852221-3 (Japan), ISBN 1-56931-558-2 (USA)
  - vol.2, ISBN 4-04-852225-6 (Japan)
  - vol.3, ISBN 4-04-852480-1 (Japan), ISBN 1-59116-024-3 (USA)
  - vol.4, ISBN 4-04-852588-3 (Japan), ISBN 1-59116-055-3 (USA)
  - vol.5, ISBN 4-04-852803-3 (Japan), ISBN 1-59116-200-9 (USA)
- Mobile Suit Gundam École du Ciel
  - vol.1, ISBN 4-04-713520-8, ISBN 4-04-713521-6 (special edition, bonus CD-ROM) (Japan), ISBN 1-59532-851-3 (USA)
  - vol.2, ISBN 4-04-713564-X (Japan), ISBN 1-59532-852-1 (USA)
  - vol.3, ISBN 4-04-713612-3 (Japan), ISBN 1-59532-853-X (USA)
  - vol.4, ISBN 4-04-713641-7 (Japan), ISBN 1-59532-854-8 (USA)
  - vol.5, ISBN 4-04-713687-5, ISBN 4-04-900768-1 (special edition, bonus figure) (Japan), ISBN 1-59816-209-8 (USA)
  - vol.6, ISBN 4-04-713723-5
  - vol.7, ISBN 4-04-713752-9
  - vol.8, ISBN 4-04-713802-9, ISBN 4-04-900780-0 (special edition, bonus figure)
  - vol.9, ISBN 4-04-713854-1
- Reverb, ISBN 4-04-926186-3
- The Super Dimension Fortress Macross: The First - Macross Ace Magazine

== Other ==
- Aquarian Age Trading Card Game (card illustrations)
- Chaos Gear Trading Card Game (card illustrations)
- CM's Macross Figure Collection (cover illustration)
- Gundam the Ride: A Baoa Qu (amusement park ride, character design)
- Macross VF-X2 Original Soundtrack (cover, inside illustrations)
- Macross 7 Trash (radio drama, illustrations)
- Marionette Generation: Out of Ganchu (CD album + illustration book)
- Megazone 23 Original Soundtrack Part I and II (cover, inside illustrations)
- Mobile Suit Gundam: Hathaway's Flash (novel illustration)
