= Misa Hayase =

Fictional character from the Macross franchise

- Super Dimension Fortress Macross character
- Misa Hayase in the Super Dimension Fortress Macross television series.
- First appearance: Super Dimension Fortress Macross episode 1: "Boobytrap"
- Created by: Shōji Kawamori
- Designed by: Haruhiko Mikimoto
- Voiced by: Japanese; Mika Doi; English; Monica Rial

In-universe information
- Occupation: Air Group Chief Tactical Officer (Chief Operator); Ship Captain
- Affiliation: UN Spacy
- Family: Takashi Hayase (Father); Sakiko Hayase (Mother, deceased)
- Spouse: Hikaru Ichijyo
- Children: Miku Ichijyo (Daughter)
- Nationality: Japanese
- Born: March 3, 1990
- Birthplace: Japan
- Notable tactics: Daedalus Attack

Misa Hayase (Japanese: 早瀬 未沙, Hepburn: Hayase Misa) is one of the principal fictional characters of the Japanese anime series Super Dimension Fortress Macross, which launched the eponymous franchise. She is a central figure in the series' primary romantic storyline, forming part of a widely noted love triangle with pilot Hikaru Ichijyo and pop idol Lynn Minmay.

Created by Shōji Kawamori and designed by Haruhiko Mikimoto, Misa holds a higher rank than series protagonist Hikaru Ichijyo, a structural dynamic noted by Kawamori in discussions of the character's design. She appears in the original television series, its film adaptation Macross: Do You Remember Love?, and the OVA Flash Back 2012. Beyond animation, she has been the subject of dedicated novelizations, manga reinterpretations by original designer Mikimoto, and several audio drama productions that expand her story and characterization across supplementary franchise material. In the original Japanese productions, both audio and visual, she was voiced by Mika Doi, who later reprised the role in several Macross video games. In the English-language dub released by ADV Films in 2006, the character was voiced by Monica Rial.

Merchandise based on Misa Hayase includes plastic models and figures. Her early popularity and critical reception within Japanese anime fandom are reflected in her 1983 win of the first Animage Grand Prix Award for Best Female Character, a standing that persisted as she ranked 7th overall in NHK's 2019 franchise-wide "All Macross Big Voting" poll. In subsequent academic analysis, Misa was noted as one of the first, if not the first, "strong female characters" of the Real robot anime genre, contributing to what has been described as the maturation of the genre through the integration of complex love stories and mecha action.

== In Macross ==
Within the fictional continuity of Macross, Misa Hayase is depicted as a career military officer born into a long-established Japanese military family, the only daughter of Admiral Takashi Hayase. Developing romantic feelings for UN Spacy officer Riber Fruhling during her adolescence, she sought to join him in military service. Her father arranged for her enrollment in a UN Spacy Officers' Academy before she had completed her secondary education. (Note: Contemporary sources give conflicting information on the timing of Misa's enrollment. Macross Graffiti places her entry into military service in 2002, i.e at the age of 12, while Misa Hayase: White Reminiscences is less concrete, with passages suggesting dates of either 2003 or 2004, i.e. at the age of 13 or 14.) She graduated first in her class before being assigned as a bridge officer aboard the SDF-1 Macross with the rank of First Lieutenant. During her service aboard the Macross, she forms a close professional and personal friendship with fellow officer Claudia LaSalle.

Riber was killed during an attack on a returning UN Spacy fleet while Misa was still a cadet and before she was able to express her feelings for him, an experience later associated in supplementary materials with her emotionally restrained demeanor and strong focus on duty. In the series' later episodes and related works, Misa explicitly reflects on this reserve, expressing regret over her difficulty in being direct and open about her feelings. The nuances of Misa's upbringing and her relationship with Riber were further codified in the 1984 novel Misa Hayase: White Reminiscences (早瀬未沙 白い追憶), written by series scriptwriter Hiroshi Ōnogi. This print expansion details her childhood in a rigid military household, the psychological and emotional toll of the loss of Riber and her mother, and how her father's handling of these events — most notably her early entry into military service and her mother's death — further complicated their relationship.

During Space War I — the war involving the Macross and, by extension, the UN Spacy on one hand and the Zentradi alien warrior race on the other — Misa's role extends beyond her formal duties as a bridge officer. She exhibits tactical resourcefulness in devising the unconventional Daedalus Attack maneuver, repurposing the docked landing ship Daedalus as an offensive weapon when the Macross's main cannon became inoperable. Recognizing the implausibility of a military solution to the war against the Zentradi, she advocates within the Macross's military hierarchy for accepting Zentradi defectors who had been exposed to human culture, and subsequently attempts to persuade UN Forces High Command to pursue a negotiated settlement rather than rely on a military strike.

Misa's initially strained relationship with civilian pilot Hikaru Ichijyo, marked by conflicts over authority and conduct, gradually evolves over the course of Space War I as they experience prolonged combat conditions and repeated crises together. This evolving relationship becomes one axis of the central love triangle of the series, contrasting Misa's professionalism and sense of responsibility with the public persona and emotional expressiveness of pop idol Lynn Minmay.

Following the conclusion of Space War I, Misa and Hikaru's relationship stabilizes after a prolonged period of emotional uncertainty. They later marry and have a daughter, Miku Ichijyo (一条 未来 Ichijō Miku). At the end of the television series, Misa is selected by Admiral Bruno J. Global to command the long-range colonization vessel SDF-2 Megaroad-01. In subsequent canon material, Hikaru is depicted as leading its Valkyrie (transformable space-capable fighter aircraft) contingent. The ship departs Earth as part of the UN government's space colonization program and is declared missing several years later. Additionally, audio drama productions — most notably the Macross Classic series — provide narrative bridges between the conclusion of Space War I and Misa's eventual departure on the Megaroad-01.

== Production ==
Early pre-production draft of Misa Hayase. In this preliminary stage, her name was 早瀬亜生, transliterated as Hayase Asao or Hayase Aki.

Misa Hayase was written by Macross creator Shōji Kawamori, based on a character concept he considered innovative at the time. She was conceived as one of the principal commanders aboard the spaceship that was eventually known as the SDF-1 Macross, and as a superior officer of the series' male protagonist, fighter pilot Hikaru Ichijyo (renamed Rick Hunter in Robotech), while also later becoming his romantic partner. Kawamori has stated that he had not encountered this combination of professional hierarchy and romantic development in contemporary Hollywood movies before.

In the earliest conceptual drafts, the character's name was originally written as 早瀬亜生. The polyphonic nature of the kanji for the given name (亜生) lends itself to several different transliterations, such as "Hayase Asao" or, as transliterated in the liner notes of the AnimEigo DVD release, "Hayase Aki". Early pre-production sketches depict a version of the character heavily influenced by contemporary 1980s Japanese pop culture, including a feathered hairstyle reminiscent of the 'Idol' aesthetic popularized by singers like Seiko Matsuda and theatrical military attire featuring an oversized peaked cap. By the project's proposal phase in February and March 1982, the character's name was finalized as Misa, while her design was refined into a more grounded professional officer. Key changes were her physical appearance and hairstyle, which were now much closer to her depiction in the series, and the deletion of the exaggerated headgear.

In commentary included in the liner notes for AnimEigo's remastered and English-subtitled DVD release of the television series, he described the series' central roles by stating that "in Macross, Hikaru is the hero, Misa is the heroine, and Minmay is the star," explicitly distinguishing Misa's narrative function from Minmay's celebrity-driven prominence. Haruhiko Mikimoto, the series' character designer, and director Noboru Ishiguro later recalled that early animation models of Misa made her appear older than her canonical age of 19, prompting subsequent efforts by the animation staff to "de-age" her appearance both in the television series and the theatrical adaptation.

Misa Hayase as she appears in the 1984 Macross: Do You Remember Love? movie. The stylistic evolution of her features is evident, reflecting the work undertaken by the animation staff to "de-age" her.

In 2009, Haruhiko Mikimoto began the manga series Macross: The First, a modern reimagining of the original story. In this series, Mikimoto updated Misa's visual design to reflect contemporary aesthetics while retaining her 1980s stylistic roots, and reinterpreted her personality to emphasize different aspects of her character. Audio productions after the airing of the original series also allowed for the return of the original voice cast, ensuring a consistent auditory identity for the character across decades of disparate media.

According to Kawamori, later films — most notably Top Gun (1986) — employed a similar dynamic, pairing fighter pilots with superior officers in a narrative that combined aerial combat with popular music. He remarked that "many people pointed out that later films like Top Gun copied that idea and setting, as well as including the combination of many songs and fighters too."

In the American adaptation of the series, Robotech, Misa was renamed Lisa Hayes, and her background was altered to depict her as Caucasian American.

== Characterization ==
Misa Hayase as she appears in The Super Dimension Fortress Macross: Flash Back 2012.

Misa Hayase is portrayed as a disciplined and emotionally restrained career officer whose personal identity is closely aligned to her professional role within the UN Spacy command structure. Series creator Shōji Kawamori stated that she was conceived in deliberate contrast to contemporary romantic tropes, positioning her as a military superior of the male protagonist Hikaru Ichijyo and defining her as the narrative's "heroine," distinct from Lynn Minmay's role as its "star." This structural distinction frames Misa as a character associated with institutional authority, responsibility, and long-term commitment rather than celebrity or public performance.

Her characterization consistently emphasizes composure, procedural thinking, and adherence to duty. Supplementary materials, including the audio drama Distantly Fading Memories, underscore her self-awareness of her emotional reserve. In these works, she is depicted as reflecting on her difficulty in expressing her personal feelings openly. Although initially formal and distant in interpersonal contexts, later developments show her exhibit greater emotional directness while maintaining her professional discipline.

Scholarly analysis has identified Misa as representative of a shift in female characterization within early 1980s Real robot anime, highlighting her combination of command authority and romantic centrality. Rather than functioning solely as a romantic interest, she occupies an active strategic and tactical role within the narrative structure. Her tactical acumen is exemplified by the Daedalus Attack, an unorthodox maneuver she improvised, repurposing the docked landing ship Daedalus into an offensive weapon when the main cannon of the SDF-1 Macross became inoperable. Across adaptations, including Macross: Do You Remember Love?, her portrayal maintains the series' emphasis on professionalism, restraint, and mature relational development, reinforcing her role as one of the franchise's central dramatic figures.

== Reception ==
Misa Hayase has been widely recognized for her narrative importance and character development within the Macross series, particularly for her role in its central romantic storyline and her portrayal as a competent female military officer. In 1983, she won the first Animage Anime Grand Prix for Best Female Character, reflecting her popularity and critical recognition among contemporary anime audiences. This popularity proved enduring across subsequent decades; in NHK's 2019 "All Macross Big Voting" poll, which received 254,131 entries, Misa ranked 7th in the consolidated "Overall Ranking" for characters spanning the entire franchise. Critical commentary on The Super Dimension Fortress Macross: Do You Remember Love? has similarly highlighted Misa's role in the film's emotional core, with reviewers noting that her involvement in the love triangle with Hikaru Ichijyo and Lynn Minmay reinforces the film's themes of emotional sacrifice, loss, and maturity amid wartime conditions.

Misa has also been recognized in scholarly analysis as a pivotal figure in the evolution of the Real robot anime genre. Researcher Alba González Torrents highlights her as a foundational "strong female character" in the genre. Torrents argues that Misa's military role and her involvement in the series' central love triangle helped establish Macross as the transition of the genre into a more mature art form.

== Legacy ==
Despite the popularity of the original series and the subsequent movie, none of the main characters has been featured in later installments of the Macross franchise. This was a conscious decision by series creator Shōji Kawamori, who had expressed his disinterest in sequels, as documented by anime historian Sean O'Mara, citing contemporary interviews from Animage and Animerica, and This Is Animation. O'Mara also underlined that the OVA Flash Back 2012, which was essentially a compilation of music and footage from the television series and the 1984 film adaptation with some additional original animated material, constituted an attempt to provide closure to this storyline, while leaving the main characters' fate open to interpretation.

Still, subsequent animated productions within the franchise have occasionally echoed aspects of Misa Hayase's characterization, albeit without directly replicating her combination of narrative centrality, professional authority, and romantic function. In Macross Frontier, the supporting character Catherine Glass bears a visual resemblance to Misa and is similarly portrayed as a pragmatic, no-nonsense military officer; however, unlike Misa, Catherine occupies a secondary role, is not positioned at the center of the series' romantic storyline, and her demeanor is not presented as the result of a traumatic past.

Elements of Misa's personality and narrative function have also been identified in Macross Frontier's portrayal of co-lead Sheryl Nome. While Sheryl is primarily presented as an idol singer and a rival within the series' central love triangle, her assertiveness echoes aspects of Misa's character. This thematic linkage is made explicit in the Macross Frontier manga adaptation by Hayato Aoki, which includes a visual homage depicting Sheryl wearing Misa's uniform, alongside parallel costuming of Ranka Lee as Lynn Minmay and protagonist Alto Saotome as Hikaru Ichijyo.

Beyond her narrative role, Misa has been recognized in scholarly analysis as a pivotal figure in the evolution of the Real robot anime genre. In her doctoral thesis, Alba González Torrents highlights her as a seminal "strong female character," noting that her presence as a prominent military officer and her central role in the series' love triangle helped signal the "maturation" of the genre through the successful combination of mecha action with complex emotional and romantic drama.

=== Merchandise ===
As a foundational icon of the Macross franchise, Misa Hayase has been extensively featured in relevant merchandise, reflecting her status as a "first-generation" anime heroine. Her merchandise history mirrors the evolution of the Japanese anime collectibles industry from the 1980s to the present. Early products consisted of unassembled plastic model kits requiring hobbyist skills (such as Imai's 1983 injection-molded plastic models), reflecting the era's DIY-oriented collector market. By the late 1990s, manufacturers like Banpresto had shifted toward pre-painted, display-ready figures, marking the industry's transition to a broader collector base. More recent releases by companies such as Max Factory represent the premium collectible market, featuring detailed sculpting and interchangeable parts for alternate display configurations.
