= Wendros =

Wendros AB was a film company headquartered in Huddinge, founded in 1976. It mainly delivered children's movies on VHS from 1981 to the early 1990s. In 1998, they were bought up by Ozon Media who continued to publish cartoons.

Wendros now only provide video games and computer games.
