= Sukehiro Tomita =

Japanese scenario writer (born 1948)

- 富田 祐弘
- Born: April 14, 1948 (age 78)
- Occupation: Anime screenwriter
- Writing career
- Notable works: Sailor Moon; Wedding Peach; Phantom Thief Jeanne; Digimon Frontier; Gall Force; Macross II; Macross 7

Japanese name
- Kanji: 富田 祐弘
- Hiragana: とみた すけひろ
- Romanization: Tomita Sukehiro

Sukehiro Tomita (Japanese: 富田 祐弘, Hepburn: Tomita Sukehiro; born April 14, 1948) is a Japanese anime screenwriter. He is known for his work on Sailor Moon, Wedding Peach, Phantom Thief Jeanne, Digimon Frontier, Gall Force and Macross II. At the 2024 Tokyo Anime Award Festival, Tomita won the Lifetime Achievement Award in the scriptwriter category.

== Screenwriting ==
=== Anime television series ===
Series head writer denoted in bold.

- Ganso Tensai Bakabon (1977)
- Cho Super Car Gattaiger (1977-1978)
- Gekisou! Rubenkaiser (1977-1978)
- Majokko Tickle (1978)
- Starzinger (1978-1979)
- Megaloman (1979)
- Invincible Robo Trider G7 (1980)
- King Arthur (1980)
- Space Runaway Ideon (1980-1981)
- Fisherman Sanpei (1980-1982)
- Saikyo Robo Daioja (1981)
- Dotakon (1981)
- GoShogun (1981)
- Galaxy Cyclone Braiger (1981)
- Dash Kappei (1982)
- Fang of the Sun Dougram (1982-1983)
- Super Dimension Fortress Macross (1982-1983)
- Love Me, My Knight (1983)
- Mirai Keisatsu Urashiman (1983)
- Super Dimension Century Orguss (1983-1984)
- **Aura Battler Dunbine** (1983-1984)
- **Genesis Climber Mospeada** (1983-1984)
- Heavy Metal L-Gaim (1984-1985)
- **Persia, the Magic Fairy** (1984-1985)
- Wing-Man (1984-1985)
- Futari Daka (1984-1985)
- **Alpen Rose** (1985)
- Ninja Senshi Tobikage (1985-1986)
- **Ganbare, Kickers!** (1986)
- Kimagure Orange Road (1987-1988)
- Mami the Psychic (1987-1989)
- **Bikkuriman** (1987-1989)
- Osomatsu-kun (1988)
- **Shin Bikkuriman** (1989-1990)
- Dragon Quest: Legend of the Hero Abel (1989-1991)
- **Tasuke, the Samurai Cop** (1990-1991)
- **RPG Densetsu Hepoi** (1990-1991)
- Genji Tsūshin Agedama (1991)
- High School Mystery: Gakuen Nanafushigi (1991-1992)
- **Sailor Moon** (1992-1993)
- Yu Yu Hakusho (1992-1994)
- Mobile Suit Victory Gundam (1993-1994)
- **Sailor Moon R** (1993-1994)
- **Sailor Moon S** (1994-1995)
- **Macross 7** (1994-1995)
- **Ping-Pong Club** (1995)
- **Wedding Peach** (1995-1996)
- B't X (1996)
- **Baby & Me** (1996)
- **Jigoku Sensei Nūbē** (1996-1997)
- **The Legend of Zorro** (1996-1997)
- **Hyper Police** (1997)
- Anime Ganbare Goemon (1998)
- Weiß Kreuz (1998)
- **Yoiko** (1998-1999)
- **Power Stone** (1999)
- **Burst Ball Barrage!! Super B-Daman** (1999)
- **Phantom Thief Jeanne** (1999-2000)
- Ceres, Celestial Legend (2000)
- Gear Fighter Dendoh (2000)
- **Salaryman Kintarō** (2001)
- **Digimon Frontier** (2002-2003)
- **Ki Fighter Taerang** (2002-2003)
- Firestorm (2003)
- **Pluster World** (2003-2004)
- **Full-Blast Science Adventure – So That's How It Is** (2003-2004)
- Agatha Christie's Great Detectives Poirot and Marple (2004-2005)
- The Snow Queen (2005)
- **Crash B-Daman** (2006)
- Happy Lucky Bikkuriman (2006-2007)
- Shōwa Monogatari (2011)
- You and Idol Pretty Cure (2025-2026)
- Star Detective Pretty Cure! (2026-2027)

=== Live action TV ===
- Kamen Rider Super-1 (1981)
- Hana no Asuka-gumi! (1988)

=== Films ===
- The Ideon: Be Invoked (1982)
- Dougram: Documentary of the Fang of the Sun (1983)
- Macross: Do You Remember Love? (1984)
- Utsunomiko (1989)
- Utsunomiko 2: Tenjohen (1990)
- Sailor Moon R: The Movie (1993)
- Sailor Moon S: The Movie (1994)
- Jigoku Sensei Nūbē (1996)

=== OVAs ===
- series head writer denoted in bold
- Gall Force: Eternal Story (1986)
- Outlanders (1986)
- Elf 17 (1987)
- Cleopatra DC (1989)
- Hi-Speed Jecy (1989-1990)
- Devil Hunter Yohko (1990)
- **Super Dimensional Fortress Macross II: Lovers Again** (1992)
- Dokyusei: End of Summer (1994-1995)
- Fencer of Minerva (1995)
- Wedding Peach DX (1996-1997)
- Macross Dynamite 7 (1997-1998)

== Manga ==
- Super Dimensional Fortress Macross II: Lovers Again (1993)
- Wedding Peach (1994-1996)
- Baby Birth (2001-2002)
