= Macross: Do You Remember Love? =

The Super Dimension Fortress Macross: Do You Remember Love?
- Directed by: Noboru Ishiguro; Shōji Kawamori
- Screenplay by: Sukehiro Tomita
- Story by: Shōji Kawamori
- Based on: The Super Dimension Fortress Macross by Studio Nue
- Produced by: Akira Inoue; Hiroshi Iwata; Tsuneyuki Enomoto
- Starring: Arihiro Hase; Mari Iijima; Mika Doi
- Music by: Kentarō Haneda
- Production companies: Tatsunoko Production; Artland
- Distributed by: Toho
- Release date: July 21, 1984
- Running time: 115 minutes
- Country: Japan
- Language: Japanese
- Budget: ¥400 million
- Box office: ¥1.8 billion

The Super Dimension Fortress Macross: Do You Remember Love? (Note: Japanese: 超時空要塞マクロス 愛・おぼえていますか, Hepburn: Chōjikū Yōsai Makurosu: Ai Oboete Imasu ka; also known simply as Macross: Do You Remember Love? or Super Spacefortress Macross, or by the acronym "DYRL?") is a 1984 Japanese animated space opera film loosely based on episodes two through twenty-seven of the Super Dimension Fortress Macross animated television series.

The movie is a film adaptation of the original Macross series, with new animation. The storyline of the film does not fit directly into the Macross chronology, and was originally an alternate universe retelling of the story, but was later established as part of the Macross universe. Within the Macross universe, it is a popular movie (in other words a movie within a television series), shown in Macross 7. However, later Macross productions like Macross Frontier have used elements from both the TV series and this film. In Macross tradition, it features transforming mecha robots, Japanese pop music, and a love triangle. The movie gets its name from its romantic themes and also by the song sung during its climactic battle sequence by Lynn Minmay (voiced by Mari Iijima). In Macross Frontier, a later series in the Macross universe, the first few episodes use re-animated key scenes from this film and Flash Back 2012 to give viewers glimpses of past events.

== Plot ==
The film begins in medias res with the space fortress SDF-1 Macross trying to evade the Zentradi, an all-male giant alien race, at the edge of the Solar System. The Macross houses an entire city with tens of thousands of civilians who are cut off from Earth. During the latest assault, pilot Hikaru Ichijyo rescues pop idol Lynn Minmay, but are both trapped in a section of the fortress for days. After their rescue, they develop a close relationship.

The Zentradi, meanwhile, discover the disruptive effect that human music has on them. Their supreme leader, Gorg Boddole Zer, suspects that the human culture is deeply related to an ancient music box he has kept with him for eons. When Hikaru and Minmay joyride across Saturn's rings, the Zentradi capture them, along with Lieutenant Misa Hayase, Minmay's cousin/manager Lynn Kaifun, and Hikaru's superior Roy Föcker.

Aboard a Zentradi ship, the humans are being interrogated about their culture when a squadron of Meltrandi, all-female giant aliens, invades the ship, giving them a chance to escape. Hikaru and Misa escape from the ship, but Föcker is killed while Minmay and Kaifun remain aboard.

Hikaru and Misa arrive on a desolate world that turns out to be Earth, wiped out by a prior Zentradi attack. The two officers grow closer, and discover an ancient city of the Protoculture, where the mysterious origins of the alien giants is revealed. In the city, Misa discovers an artifact that contains lyrics to an ancient love song.

Many days later, the Macross arrives on Earth. Just as Hikaru and Misa are debriefing their story to Captain Bruno J. Global, the fortress is attacked by the Meltrandi. Despite destroying part of the Macross, the Meltrandi are forced to retreat when the Zentradi arrive, using Minmay's singing voice as their weapon.

Captain Global announces a truce and a military pact between the Macross and the Zentradi. Hikaru and Minmay reunite, but Minmay realizes he is now with Misa. Meanwhile, Misa finishes translating the song. When the Meltrandi return to attack, Boddole Zer breaks the truce and attacks the Macross.

With the Macross in danger, Hikaru persuades Minmay to perform the translated song. As the Macross flies across the battlefield, Minmay's song unites the Zentradi and the Meltrandi against Boddole Zer. Boddole Zer is defeated by the combined forces.

The film ends with a concert by Minmay in front of the rebuilt Macross.

== Cast ==
=== Original Japanese voices ===
- Arihiro Hase as Hikaru Ichijyo
- Mari Iijima as Lynn Minmay
- Mika Doi as Misa Hayase
- Akira Kamiya as Roy Focker
- Eiji Kanie as Vrlitwhai 7018
- Eri Takeda as Milia 639
- Hiromi Tsuru as Kim Kabirov
- Hirotaka Suzuoki as Lynn Kaifunn
- Katsumi Suzuki as Hayao Kakizaki
- Michio Hazama as Capt. Bruno J. Global
- Noriko Ohara as Claudia LaSalle
- Osamu Ichikawa as Golg Boddole Zer
- Run Sasaki as Vanessa Laird
- Ryusuke Ōbayashi as Exsedol 4970
- Sanae Miyuki as Shammy Milliome
- Shō Hayami as Max Jenius
- Yoshino Ohtori as Moruk Laplamiz
- Ikuya Sawaki as Senior Statesman
- Kenyu Horiuchi as TV Reporter
- Nagisa Andō as Meltlan Soldier
- Nobuo Tobita as Waiter
- Shigeru Nakahara as Guest B
- Tomomichi Nishimura as M.C.
- Tsutomu Fujii as Loli 28356
- Jeffrey Smith as Warera 25258
- Kent Gilbert as Konda 88333
- Yoshio Kawai as Guest A
- Youko Ogai as Dewanton 3565
- Yūichi Meguro as Quamzin 03350
- Eriko Chihara
- Junko Hino
- Kosuke Tomita
- Natsumi Sasaki
- Saki Takimoto
- Sanae Mihara
- Yasushi Sugihara
- Yuriko J. Takahashi

=== English dub ===
- John Culkin as Hikaru Ichijyo and Max Jenius (some scenes)
- Barry Haigh as Roy Focker
- Matthew Oram as Britai 7018, Golg Boddole Zer, Max Jenius (most scenes), Quamzin 03350
- Simon Broad as Bruno J. Global, Hayao Kakizaki and Lynn Kaihun
- Elizabeth Oram as Lynn Minmay and Shammy Milliome

== Production ==
Shoji Kawamori, Kazutaka Miyatake and Haruhiko Mikimoto worked on the mecha and character designs for the film. Narumi Kakinouchi, one of the creators of Vampire Princess Miyu, was the assistant animation director for this movie.

During one of the action scenes towards the end of the movie, Hikaru fires a barrage of missiles on his way to Boddole Zer. As an inside joke among the animators, two of the missiles are drawn to look like cans of Budweiser and Tako Hai (a drink which literally translates as "Octopus Highball").

The film was produced on a budget of ¥400 million, then equivalent to $1,684,000 (equivalent to $5,400,000 in 2025). It was the second most expensive anime film up until then, after Hayao Miyazaki's Lupin III: The Castle of Cagliostro (1979).

Due to production issues, some scenes that were initially storyboarded for the film had to be cut for its 1984 theatrical release. Among these was an ending sequence featuring Minmay in concert. While the original release of the film's credits featured a simple black backdrop, this concert sequence was later animated for the 1987 OVA The Super Dimension Fortress Macross: Flash Back 2012, and was later incorporated into subsequent versions of Do You Remember Love?'s end credits. This updated release has since been marketed as "The Super Dimension Fortress Macross: Do You Remember Love? Complete Edition" (超時空要塞マクロス 愛・おぼえていますか 完全版). An additional scene featuring the marriage of Max and Milia was storyboarded, but not animated. This was later incorporated as a flashback in Macross 7.

=== Music ===
The film's soundtrack was composed by Kentaro Haneda, featuring new orchestral tracks and some music from the original TV series. The theme song "Do You Remember Love" was composed by Kazuhiko Katō and performed by Mari Iijima. The Complete Edition's ending theme, "An Angel's Paints", was composed and performed by Iijima.

== Release ==
The film premiered in Japanese theaters on July 7, 1984. It received a huge marketing campaign that generated very long lines of fans; many of them camped outside cinemas the night prior to the film. These events were dramatized in the anime comedy Otaku no Video from 1991. In the 1984 edition of the Anime Grand Prix, the film was ranked second, behind Nausicaä of the Valley of the Wind. The film's theme song was also ranked first.

=== Box office ===
The film earned a distribution income (gross rentals) of ¥700 million in Japan. This is equivalent to approximately ¥1.8 billion in total box office gross revenue.

== Relation to the TV series ==
Do You Remember Love? is a reinterpretation of The Super Dimension Fortress Macross in a feature film format. Almost all of the characters featured in the TV series appear in the film. Most of the voice actors from the TV series reprised their roles for the film. The love triangle and the various relationships are intact.

Macross 7 describes a film called Do You Remember Love? within the fictional world of Macross. Series creator Shoji Kawamori also gave an explanation about the differences in the television and film depictions of Space War I: "The real Macross is out there, somewhere. If I tell the story in the length of a TV series, it looks one way, and if I tell it as a movie-length story, it's organized another way...".

Many ships, mecha, and characters were redesigned for the film. These designs have been featured in later entries of the Macross franchise. The Zentradi were given a language of their own and most of the dialogue of Zentradi characters is in that language.

- The Zentradi males and females are named Zentran and Meltran and placed on opposite sides of the Protoculture conflict. No mention is made of the Supervision Army. The Meltlandi, in addition to being in a separate fleet of their own have distinctive ship and mecha designs.
- In the original Macross TV series, the Zentradi's dialogue was automatically translated into Japanese. In this animated film, they are heard speaking a fictional extraterrestrial language specifically developed for the movie as subtitles are provided for the audience, much like the Klingon language in Star Trek (of which a word wasn't spoken until they both appeared in their first theatrical version). This language was subsequently used in further installations of the Macross universe.
- The SDF-1 is designed slightly differently and instead of having the Daedalus and Prometheus docked as its 'arms' it has two ARMD carriers. This became the design of the Macross in further series installments such as Macross II, Macross Plus and Macross Frontier.
- The origin of the SDF-1 is also different. Instead of being a Supervision Army Gun Destroyer like in the TV series, in the Do You Remember Love? film the SDF-1 was originally a Meltlandi Gun Destroyer that crashed on Earth and was reconstructed by humans. The Zentradi attack Earth as soon as they discover the ship which belongs to their Meltlandi enemies.
- Zentradi Supreme Leader Gorg Boddole Zer's physical appearance in the film completely differs from that in the TV series. Instead of being merely a bald Zentran, his head is cybernetically fused with his mobile space fortress. Also, Boddole Zer towers incredibly high above the Zentradi in comparison to the TV series where he was slightly taller than Britai Kridanik.

== International versions ==
According to Carl Macek, when asked by Cannon Films to produce a film version of Robotech, he mentioned he was interested in dubbing and localizing Do You Remember Love? with the voice cast from the series, but Harmony Gold USA was unable to license the film for "whatever political reasons" that he did not know. Megazone 23 Part 1 was used instead.

Originally, two versions of a Toho International-commissioned dub had been released in the United States throughout the late 1980s and early 1990s. The Toho dub (named Super Spacefortress Macross in its on-screen title and Japanese packaging) had been created for export sales in Hong Kong by Matthew Oram and his wife Elizabeth's dubbing company. The better known of the two US releases of the dub is an edited-for-television version renamed Clash of the Bionoids, prepared by Peregrine Film Distribution, Inc. for its broadcast syndication package Dynamagic in 1986 (which included three other Toho International titles). This version was released by Celebrity Home Entertainment's "Just for Kids" label in 1988. The ending was modified from the original Japanese version: the scene with Hikaru calling the Macross after Boddole Zer's explosion was removed, giving the false impression that Hikaru died in the blast. Later, a subtitled version was briefly released before being suppressed due to the ongoing legal battles between Big West/Studio Nue, Tatsunoko and Harmony Gold. Clash of the Bionoids also aired on various local TV stations from 1989-1997 as well as Showtime 2 in 2004.

Robert Woodhead, head of AnimEigo, has said publicly that he would like to release the film (AnimEigo released the first pressings of the Macross series in the US), but believes it will most likely never get a proper DVD release in the United States due to the legal disputes surrounding the film. The movie was released in widescreen in both dubbed and subtitled format by Kiseki Films in the UK on video in the 1990s, but was notably one of their few catalog titles not being released on DVD.

Re-released in the 2000s on DVD, a full 90-minute Swedish dub was released in the 1980s by Wendros, based on the Toho Super Spacefortress Macross version.

Although Big West, Studio Nue, and Harmony Gold reached an agreement to release various Macross sequels outside of Japan in 2021, the official Robotech account on Twitter has stated that Do You Remember Love? remains prohibited as of 2023. In 2026, at Big West's Macross panel at New York Comic Con, it was announced that the rights to Do You Remember Love? would finally be included as part of the worldwide rights, with further details to be revealed later on.

A Japanese 4K resolution remaster version of the film was released as a two pack of an Ultra HD and standard Blu-ray in January 2025. This release included a brand new English subtitle track.

== Video games ==
- An arcade game titled Super Spacefortress Macross was released in 1992.
- A loose game sequel called The Super Dimension Fortress Macross: Scrambled Valkyrie was released in 1993 for the Super Famicom.
- A CD-based video game was released for the Sega Saturn in 1997 and the Sony PlayStation in 1999, titled Macross: Do You Remember Love?. It was a 2D shooter that followed the movie's storyline using cut scenes from the film and additional footage.
- In The Super Dimension Fortress Macross PlayStation 2 video game players are able to choose either a long and easier "TV path" or the more difficult and shorter "Movie path" of the game, which is based on the events of Do You Remember Love? and also has several missions that feature situations not shown on film.
- Characters of the film appear in the Super Robot Wars Alpha videogame, as well as two different paths to choose during gameplay (one which follows some events of the TV series, and the other which follows the events from movie). The player can use Max Jenius to try to recruit Milia Fallyna to your side in one stage, but the way their final confrontation plays out in a later stage determines whether Milia gets micronized (as in the series), or Max gets macronized (as in the movie) when she finally joins you.
