= Hikaru Ichijyo =

Fictional character from the Macross franchise

- Super Dimension Fortress Macross character
- Hikaru Ichijyo in the Super Dimension Fortress Macross television series.
- First appearance: Super Dimension Fortress Macross episode 1: "Boobytrap"
- Created by: Shōji Kawamori
- Designed by: Haruhiko Mikimoto
- Voiced by: Japanese; Arihiro Hase; Kenji Nojima; English; Vic Mignogna

In-universe information
- Occupation: Air Racer; Fighter Pilot; CAG; Test Pilot
- Affiliation: UN Spacy
- Spouse: Misa Hayase
- Children: Miku Ichijyo (Daughter)
- Nationality: Japanese

Hikaru Ichijyo (Japanese: 一条 輝, Hepburn: Ichijō Hikaru) (Note: The original animation and the distributors Bandai Visual and Victor Entertainment romanize his name as Hikaru Ichijyo, while AnimEigo also uses Hikaru Ichijo.) is the main fictional character of the Japanese anime series Super Dimension Fortress Macross, which launched the eponymous franchise. He is a central figure in the human-alien war narrated in the series and its primary romantic storyline, forming part of a widely noted love triangle with Misa Hayase and Lynn Minmay.

He appears in the original television series, its film adaptation Macross: Do You Remember Love?, and the OVA Flash Back 2012. Beyond animation, he also features in novelizations and side stories, in manga reinterpretations by original designer Haruhiko Mikimoto, as well as several audio drama productions that expand his story and characterization across supplementary franchise material.

In the original Japanese audio and visual productions, he was voiced by Arihiro Hase until the actor's death in 1996, after which Kenji Nojima assumed the role. In the English dub of the series produced by ADV Films, his voice actor is Vic Mignogna.

Merchandise based on Hikaru Ichijyo and particularly his VF-1 Valkyrie transformable fighter includes plastic models and figures. His early popularity and critical reception among Japanese anime fandom are reflected in his fourth place in the 1983 Animage Grand Prix Award for Best Male Character.

== In Macross ==
Hikaru Ichijyo as he appears in The Super Dimension Fortress Macross: Flash Back 2012.

Within the fictional continuity of Macross, Hikaru Ichijyo is depicted as a solitary figure whose early life was defined by the dual influences of aviation and profound personal loss. Having lost his mother during childhood, Hikaru was raised by his father who ran an aerobatic flying circus. This upbringing was cut short when his father was killed during a flight exhibition, an event Hikaru recounts with morbid stoicism in the film Macross: Do You Remember Love?, attributing it to pilot error. By the age of 17, Hikaru had become a self-sufficient competitive pilot, supporting himself on the air racing circuit through prize money, which fostered a fiercely independent and somewhat cynical worldview.

Hikaru's development is primarily shaped by his relationships with his senpai Roy Focker, pop idol Lynn Minmay, and the Macross's Air Group Chief Tactical Officer Misa Hayase. Despite his admiration for Focker, moral and emotional friction between the two becomes apparent early on, when he arrives to the launch ceremony of the SDF-1 Macross, invited by Focker, only to find himself pulled into a galactic war against an alien race called the Zentradi. Focker's status as a distinguished ace pilot of the Unification Wars leaves Hikaru largely unimpressed; instead, he confronts his mentor as a '"murderer" and frequently chides his womanizing behavior, signaling a deep-seated aversion to the glorification of combat and his mentor's hedonistic lifestyle. This stance informs not only his initial civilian identity, but also his attitude during his later military career.

Although he initially resists the idea of military life, a series of personal setbacks and external pressures lead him to reconsider. After the initial Zentradi attack, he becomes trapped in a secluded section of the Macross with Minmay, an experience that sparks a long-lasting and often frustrating infatuation. The destruction of his civilian aircraft effectively ends his air-racing dreams and is eventually persuaded to enlist. The dual influence of Focker and Minmay, who both argue that the military offers his only opportunity to fly again was a contributing factor. But what ultimately drove him to decide to enlist was the triggering of his protective instincts by the extensive damage caused to the city, which was rebuilt inside the Macross, that resulted from the ship's first transformation.

In the early stages of his military career, he has a strained relationship with Misa Hayase, marked by conflicts over authority, discipline, and conduct. However, as the two face prolonged combat conditions and repeated crises together over the course of Space War I, their relationship gradually evolves and becomes one axis of the central love triangle of the series.

As a pilot, Hikaru quickly distinguishes himself as a capable and resilient combatant at the controls of the VF-1 Valkyrie. Though he quickly becomes an ace pilot, he is depicted as a relatable and fallible soldier rather than an invincible prodigy. His rapid promotion to the rank of Second Lieutenant places him in command of the Vermilion Team, where his leadership is defined by a deep sense of responsibility for his subordinates, Maximilian "Max" Jenius and Hayao Kakizaki. Unlike Focker, Hikaru is never portrayed as priding himself on his combat successes. On the contrary, he is frequently self-critical of his own failures and perceived inadequacies as a pilot and leader. He openly acknowledges that Max is a significantly more gifted pilot than himself, and this lack of pretension, combined with his protective instincts, defines his command style as he is promoted to First Lieutenant. After Focker's death, he inherits Focker's distinctive "Skull One" VF-1S Valkyrie – a symbolic and literal passing of the torch – and eventually attains the rank of Captain by the conclusion of the war.

Post-war, Hikaru's relationship with Misa is hampered by a period of emotional stagnation. He struggles to reconcile his nostalgic attachment to Minmay with the reality of his bond with Misa, whose deep feelings for him are met with his own indecision, placing her under significant emotional strain. The triangle is resolved at the end of the television series, when Misa, after informing Hikaru and Minmay that she had been selected to command the long-range colonization vessel SDF-2 Megaroad-01, opens up to him about her feelings. They later marry and have a daughter, Miku Ichijyo (一条 未来 Ichijō Miku). In subsequent canon material, Hikaru is depicted as leading the colonization ship's Valkyrie (transformable space-capable fighter aircraft) contingent. The ship departs Earth as part of the UN government's space colonization program and is declared missing several years later.

== Production ==
Hikaru Ichijyo was written by Macross creator Shōji Kawamori, based on a character concept he considered innovative at the time. Namely, contrary to contemporary norms in anime and Western productions, Hikaru was to have a woman as his superior officer, who would later become his romantic partner. Kawamori has stated that he had not encountered this combination of professional hierarchy and romantic development in contemporary Hollywood movies before, and that it had been pointed out to him that later films like Top Gun copied this interpersonal premise.

In the American adaptation of the series, Robotech, Hikaru Ichijyo was renamed Rick Hunter and his background was altered to depict him as Caucasian American.

== Legacy ==
Despite the popularity of the original TV series and its theatrical adaptation, none of the main characters – including Hikaru Ichijyo – has been featured in later installments of the Macross franchise. This was a conscious decision by series creator Shōji Kawamori, who had explicitly stated that he was not interested in sequels, a disinterest documented by anime historian Sean O'Mara, citing contemporary interviews from Animage and Animerica, and This Is Animation. Additionally, O'Mara underlined that the OVA Flash Back 2012 – essentially a compilation of music and footage from the television series and the 1984 film adaptation with some additional original animated material – was an attempt to provide closure to the original storyline, while leaving the main characters' fate open to interpretation.

Still, Hikaru's legacy within the Macross franchise has been palpable. Notably, both the Macross 7 and Macross Frontier television series contain references to Ichijyo's actions in Space War I and afterwards. In Macross 7, the eponymous fleet enact a play entitled "Do You Remember love?", retelling the events of Macross: Do You Remember Love? (itself an in-universe fictional retelling of the events of Space War I). Basara Nekki, the series' main character, is persuaded to play the role of Hikaru Ichijyo in the film.

In Macross Frontier, the Mihoshi Academy on board the Macross Frontier has a VF-1 Valkyrie fighter atop its roof, whose livery bears similarities to Ichijho's VF-1J from the original TV series. The thematic linkage between the original series' love triangle and the one in Macross Frontier is made explicit in the manga adaptation by Hayato Aoki, which includes a visual homage depicting Sheryl wearing Misa's uniform, alongside parallel costuming of Ranka Lee as Lynn Minmay and protagonist Alto Saotome as Hikaru Ichijyo. Furthermore, Alto, as a junior pilot of the S.M.S.'s Skull Platoon (a similar position to Ichijyo's), has his VF-25 Messiah fighter painted in the same colors as Hikaru's VF-1A (and later S) from Macross: Do You Remember Love. Hikaru Ichijyo has also been featured in many Macross video games, typically as a playable character.

=== Merchandise ===
As the founding protagonist of the Macross franchise, Hikaru Ichijyo has been extensively featured in relevant merchandise, reflecting his in-universe status. His merchandise history echoes the evolution of the Japanese anime collectibles industry from the 1980s to the present day, with manufacturers focusing mainly on the variants of the VF-1 Valkyrie that he was depicted as having piloted in the original series and its theatrical adaptation. Early products, targeting the era's DIY-oriented collector market, consisted of unassembled plastic model kits requiring hobbyist skills, (such as Arii's and Imai's 1980s injection-molded plastic models). By the late 1990s, manufacturers like Banpresto had shifted toward pre-painted, display-ready figures, marking the industry's transition to a broader collector base.
