= Mari Iijima =

Japanese actress (born 1963)

- 飯島 真理
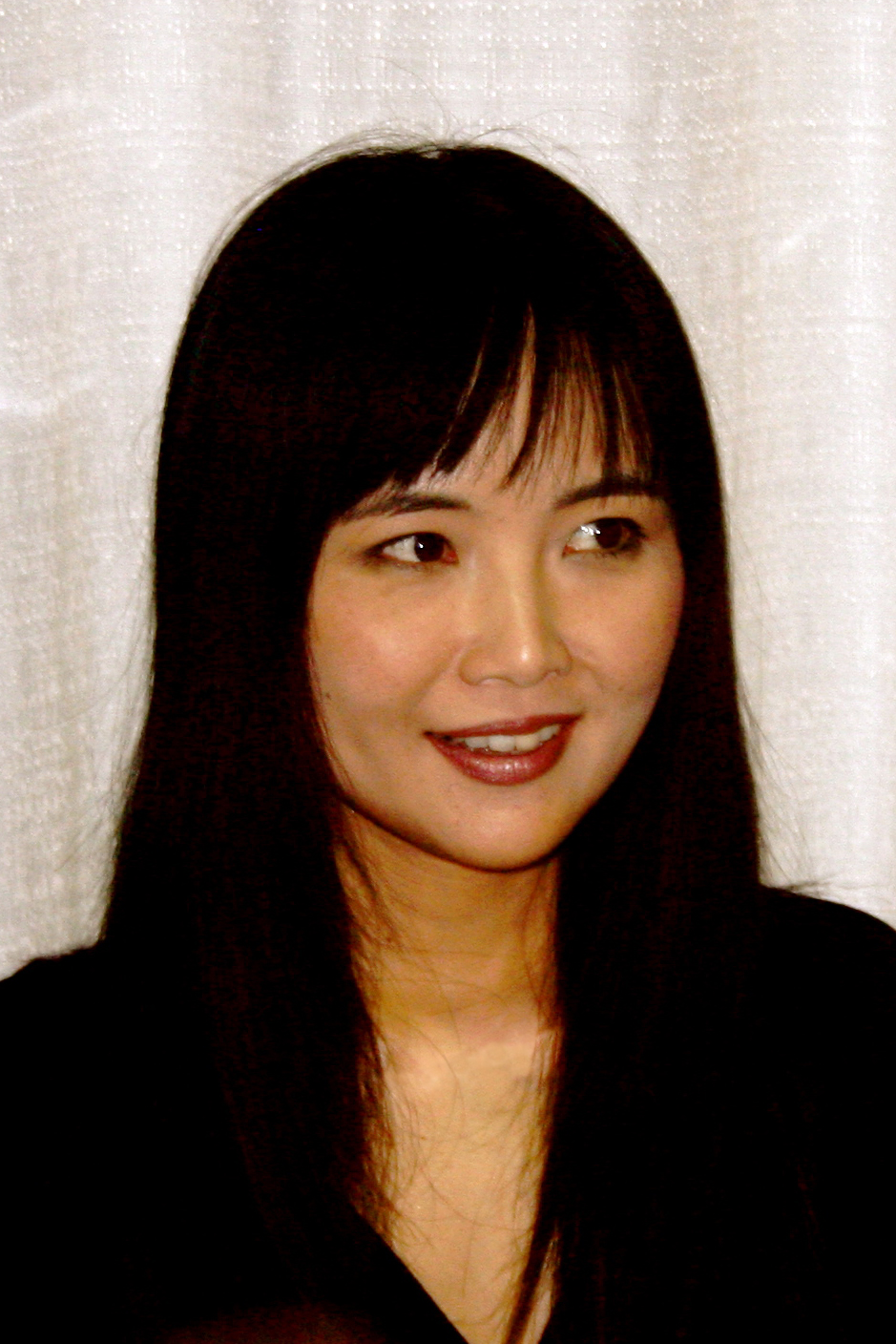
- Iijima at Tekkoshocon in 2010
- Born: May 18, 1963 (age 63); Tsuchiura, Ibaraki, Japan
- Education: Kunitachi College of Music
- Occupations: Actress; singer
- Years active: 1982–present
- Notable work: The Super Dimension Fortress Macross as Lynn Minmay
- Musical career
- Genres: J-pop; pop; city pop; synthpop
- Instruments: Vocals; piano; keyboards
- Years active: 1983–present
- Label: Marimusic/BounDee
- Website: www.marimusic.com

Mari Iijima (飯島 真理, Iijima Mari; born May 18, 1963) is a Japanese actress and singer. She writes and produces most of her own music, and plays the piano and other instruments. After being signed to JVC Victor in 1982, Mari first became known for her voice-acting role as Lynn Minmay in the anime Macross. Her debut original album, Rosé, was released in 1983, which was produced by composer Ryuichi Sakamoto. She lives in Los Angeles, California.

== Life and career ==
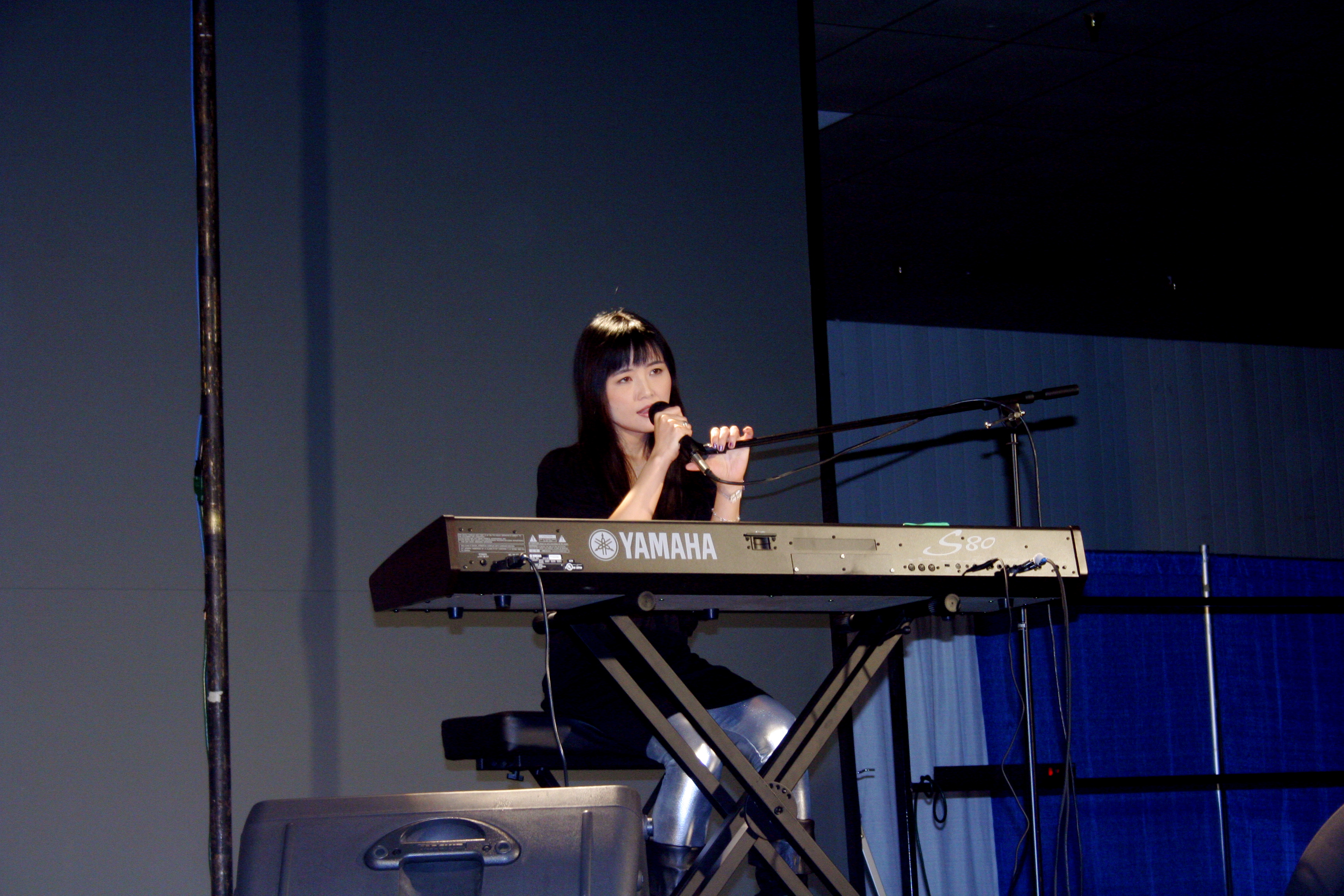
Mari Iijima live at Tekkoshocon 5, April 14, 2007

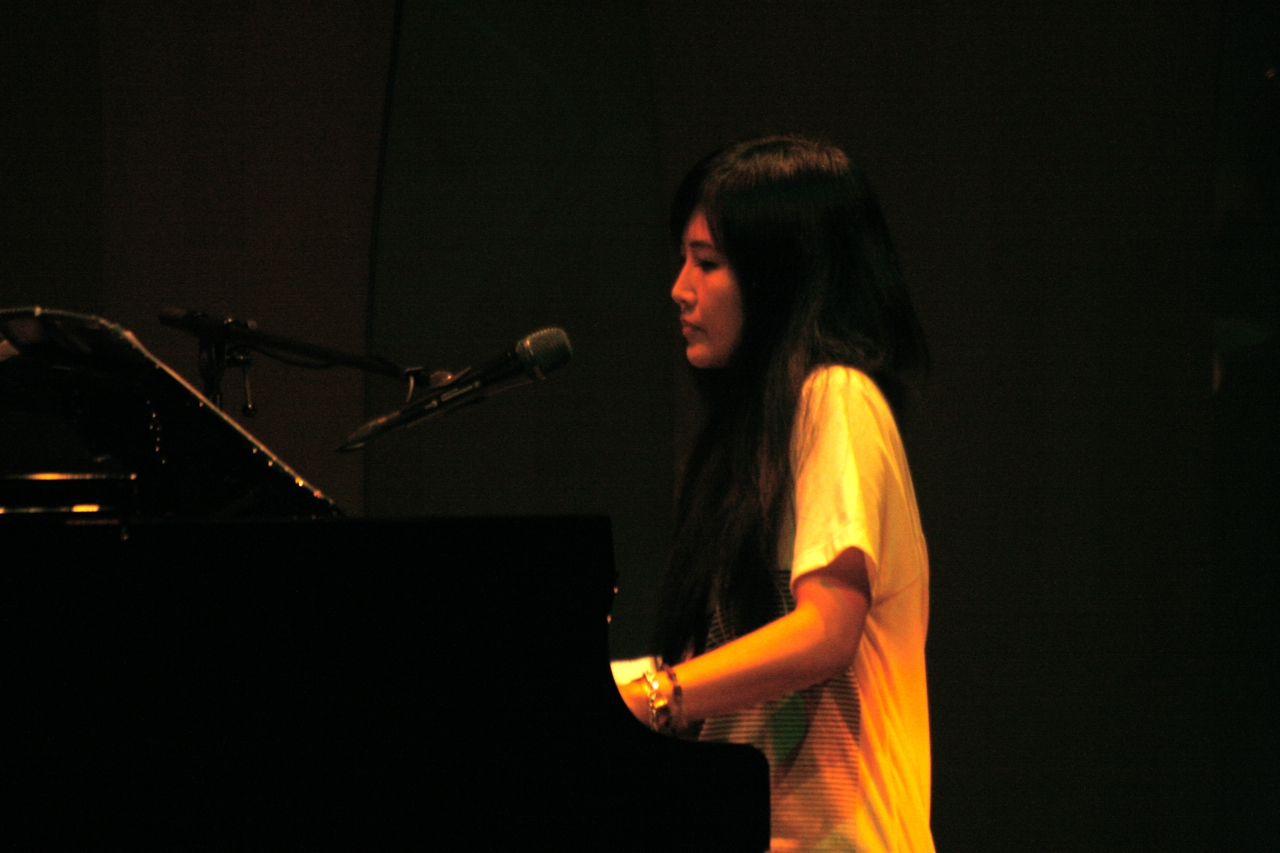
Mari Iijima Live in Tokyo at the Hakuju Hall on July 31, 2010

Iijima was born in Tsuchiura, Ibaraki. Her original demo tape was picked up by JVC Victor in 1982 and she was signed to the record company as a singer-songwriter. Soon afterward, she was asked to audition for the role of Lynn Minmay in The Super Dimension Fortress Macross by the label and the producers chose her to play the role. The series quickly became a mega hit and brought Iijima to stardom. Her debut album, Rosé, containing no Macross tracks, had lyrics and music written by her. It was produced by Ryuichi Sakamoto, who used the new Yamaha DX7 digital synthesizer (released the same year) while producing her album. Rosé debuted at number 10 on the charts in September 1983, and she started her career as a singer-songwriter.

Iijima moved to Los Angeles in 1989 to expand her music career. That same year, she appeared as a guest vocalist on Van Dyke Parks' album Tokyo Rose. It was around this time that she married James Studer, who had been her producer on her 1988 album Miss Lemon. The couple had two children, Andy and Ryan, before separating in 2001.

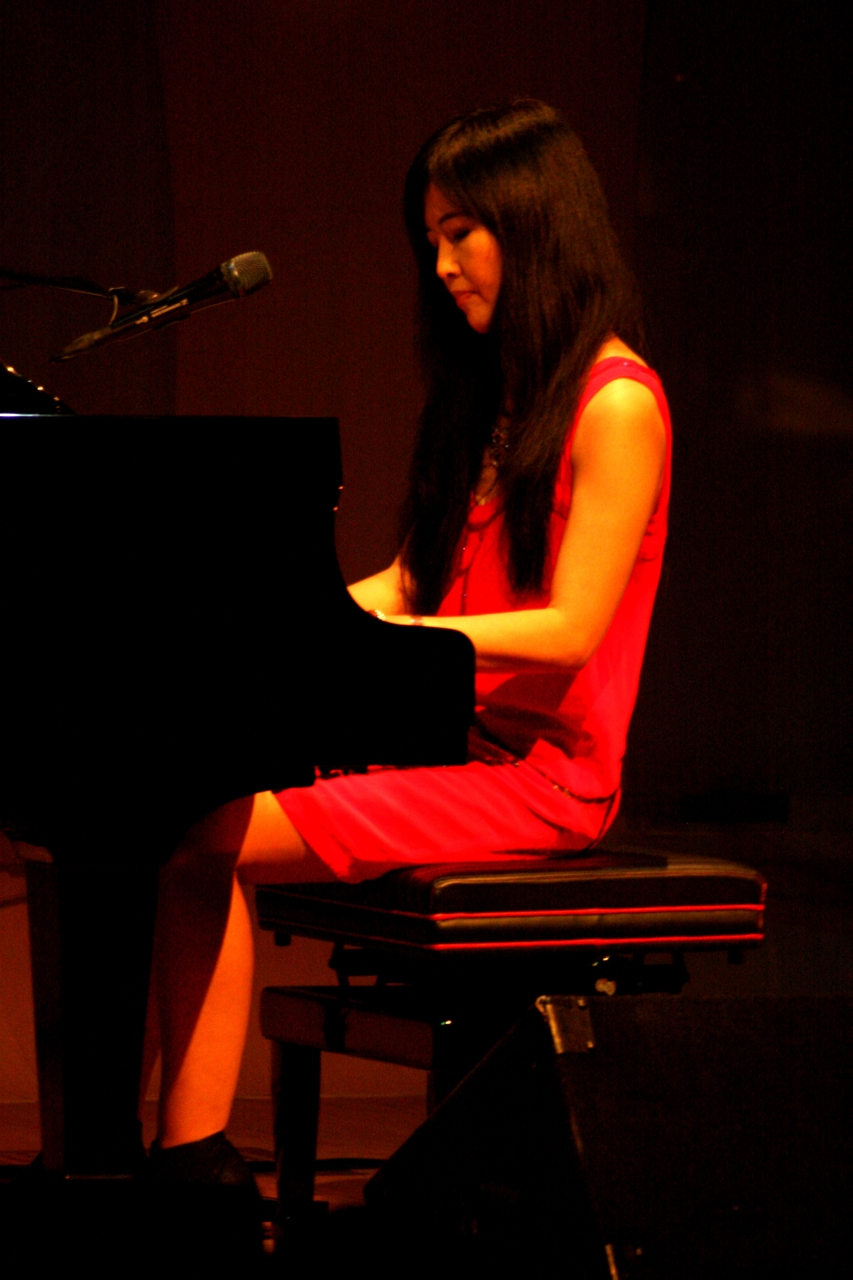
Mari Iijima Live in Tokyo at the Hakuju Hall on July 31, 2010

After releasing her first independent (and first English language) album, No Limit, she was nominated for the 2000 Los Angeles Music Awards' Best Pop Artist for the album and she was in the final four for the award. She won the best Asian song for her track Unspoken Love from the album Wonderful People at the Just Plain Folks Awards in 2006 and performed as a guest performer.

In 2006, she reprised her role as Lynn Minmay in ADV Films' English-language release of Macross, which made her the second Japanese voice actor to reprise her role in an English anime dub (following only Miyuki Sawashiro). She dedicated her performance in the ADV dub to Arihiro Hase, the Japanese voice actor of Hikaru Ichijo in Macross and a close friend of Iijima. She maintained good relations with Hase's mother after his death by suicide in 1996.

Iijima released her twenty-first studio album, called Echo, in August 2009. The title was taken from the nymph character Echo that appears in Echo and Narcissus. The album's theme is unrequited love.

She has continued to perform into the 2020s, both live and in videos, but a Tokyo concert planned for August 2020 was postponed to January 11, 2021 (then to August 28, 2021), due to the COVID-19 crisis. Iijima stated on her website that she "likes the ring of '1.11'" as a sign for the future.

== Discography ==
=== Original albums ===
Year	Title
1983	Rosé
1984	Blanche
1985	Midori
1985	Kimono Stereo
1987	Coquettish Blue
1988	Miss Lemon
1989	My Heart in Red
1990	It's a Love Thing
1991	Believe
1993	Different Worlds
1994	Love Season
1995	Sonic Boom
1996	Good Medicine
1997	Europe
1998	Rain & Shine
1999	No Limit
2001	Right Now
2003	Silent Love
2004	Wonderful People
2006	Uncompromising Innocence
2009	Echo
2012	Take a Picture Against the Light
2014	Sharp as a Knife, as Sweet as Strawberries
2016	Awakening
2018	Chaos and Stillness
2022	Being Myself

=== Compilation albums ===
Year	Title
1984	Variée
1993	The Classics
1995	Best of the Best
2004	Gems
2005	Mari picks "The Ultimate Collection" (1983–1985)
2005	Mari picks "The Ultimate Collection" (1987–1999)
2007	palette
2019	G

=== EPs ===
Year	Title
2011	2 Seconds of Infinity
2013	Dancing with Minmay
2018	Anger is The New Sadness
2020	Honto No Ai
2023	For Lovers Only II

=== Singles ===
Year	Title
1983	Yumeiro no Spoon
1983	Kitto Ieru
1984	Ai Oboete Imasu ka
1984	1 gram no Shiawase
1985	Cecile no Amagasa
1986	Harukana Hohoemi -Koudo Kougen-
1987	People! People! People!
1988	Kagami yo! Kagami (I wanna marry you)
1988	Blue Christmas
1989	Still
1989	Secret
1990	Nichiyobi No Date
1990	Sayonara Wa Ienai
1990	Bokura wa Tenshija Nai
1991	Love is a miracle
1992	Kirai
1993	Ai Oboete Imasu ka (re-release)
1994	Don't fade out!/Sunset
1995	Is There Anybody Out There?
1996	Forever Young
1997	Mikazuki no Canoe
1997	Friends
2002	Eternal love ~Hikari no Tenshi~
2003	Eternal love 2003
2009	Iki Wo Shiteru Kanjiteiru
2012	Churiru Churira/Anata No Hana Ni Naritai/The Unconventional
2013	Eternal Forest/Sky's Dance
2020	Tomei Na Kaze
2021	I'm Not In Love

=== Soundtracks ===
Year	Title
2002	Lorna Doone The Soundtrack

== Filmography ==
Year	Title	Role	Notes
1982	The Super Dimension Fortress Macross	Lynn Minmay	Voice actress and singer
1984	Macross: Do You Remember Love?	Lynn Minmay	Voice actress, singer, and songwriter for "Tenshi no Enogu"
1999	Pacific Blue	Kiko	Season 5 – episode 12 "God's Gift"
2001	Spyder Games	Soraya	Episodes 1&2
2001	Lorna Doone	Composer	(2001 re-release of 1922 film)
2004	Green Tea-r	Yoko	Lead actress and songwriter
2006	The Super Dimension Fortress Macross	Lynn Minmay	ADV Films' 2006 English Dub

== Video games ==
Year	Title	Role	Notes
2002	Galaxy Angel	Theme song performance	"Eternal love ~Hikari no Tenshi~", "Tenshi-tachi no Kyuusoku"
2003	Galaxy Angel: Moonlight Lovers	Theme song performance	"Eternal love 2003", "Tenshi-tachi no Kyuusoku"
2004	Cy-Girls	Aska (voice)	
2013	Macross 30: The Voice that Connects the Galaxy	Lynn Minmay	
