= VF-1 Valkyrie =

Fictional vehicle from Macross/Robotech

Stonewell/Bellcom VF-1 Valkyrie
- Hikaru and Roy sitting in a VF-1D dual-seater variant at South Ataria Island, 7 February 2009. Behind it is a single-seat variant, VF-1A.
- First appearance: Super Dimension Fortress Macross, Episode 1

General characteristics
- Armaments: External GU-11 55mm gunpod 1–4 Mauler RÖV-20 anti-aircraft laser cannons Four pivoting hardpoints under the wings
- Maximum speed: Mach 2.71 at 10,000 m (33,000 ft); Mach 3.87 at 30,000 m (98,000 ft)
- Propulsion: 2x Shinnakasu Heavy Industry/P&W/Roice FF-2001 thermonuclear reaction turbine engines
- Power: 11,500 kgf/650 MW each
- Mass: 13,250 kg (29,210 lb) (empty)
- Length: 14.23 m (46.7 ft) (fighter mode); 11.3 metres (37 ft) (GERWALK mode); 4 m (13 ft) (battroid mode)
- Width: 14.78 m (48.5 ft) (wings fully extended); 8.25 metres (27.1 ft) (wings swept); 7.3 m (24 ft) (battroid mode)
- Height: 3.84 m (12.6 ft) (fighter mode); 8.7 metres (29 ft) (GERWALK mode); 12.68 m (41.6 ft) (battroid mode)

In the Macross Japanese anime series, the first mass-produced transforming aerospace fighter mecha is called the VF-1 Valkyrie. In its English adaptation Robotech, it is known as a VF-1 Veritech. The VF-1 Valkyrie is referred to as a "variable fighter" in Macross.

== Background ==
The VF-1 was created between 1980 and 1982 by Japanese mecha designer Shoji Kawamori with contributions by his Studio Nue partner Kazutaka Miyatake. The VF-1 Valkyrie was to be the centerpiece mecha design for the anime series The Super Dimension Fortress Macross which aired between 1982 and 1983. The McDonnell Douglas F-15 Eagle and Grumman F-14 Tomcat with its variable-sweep wing design, served as the main design inspiration of the VF-1. When it came to naming "Valkyrie" was used as a tribute to the real world XB-70 Valkyrie, which was an experimental supersonic strategic bomber developed in the United States in the 1960s. The VF-1 was created entirely by Kawamori and Studio Nue.

== Fictional fighter design ==
=== Macross ===
In Macross, the VF-1 was developed by Stonewell/Bellcom/Shinnakasu for the U.N. Spacy by using alien Overtechnology obtained from the SDF-1 Macross alien spaceship. It was preceded into production by an aerodynamic proving version of its airframe, the VF-X. Unlike all later VF vehicles, the VF-X was strictly a jet aircraft, built to demonstrate that a jet fighter with the features necessary to convert to Battroid mode was aerodynamically feasible. After the VF-X's testing was finished, an advanced concept atmospheric-only prototype, the VF-0 Phoenix, was flight-tested from 2005 to 2007 and briefly served as an active-duty fighter from 2007 to the VF-1's rollout in late 2008, while the bugs were being worked out of the full-up VF-1 prototype (VF-X-1). The VF-1's combat debut was on February 7, 2009, during the Battle of South Ataria Island - the first battle of Space War I, and was the mainstay fighter of the U.N. Spacy for the entire conflict. Introduced in 2008, the VF-1 would be out of frontline service just five years later, replaced by the far more advanced VF-4 Lightning III. However, the fighter would continue to show its worthiness years later when, during the events of Macross 7, Milia Jenius (a major character in the original series) would use her old fighter in defense of the colonization fleet.

=== Robotech ===
In Robotech, development of the Valkyrie began at the end of the Global Civil War, when an alien spaceship crashed into Macross Island in the South Pacific. After learning of the existence of large aggressive humanoid aliens, a United Earth Government was formed and development began on the mecha by the Robotech Defense Force to combat the alien threat by using Robotechnology obtained from the SDF-1 alien ship.

In the Robotech continuity, the VF-0 did not exist; the non-transformable VF-X was followed by a version which had only fighter and Guardian mode. Not until June 2007 was the final version of the VF-1, which could transform into battloid mode, released. It unofficially saw its first combat in early 2007, when test pilot Roy Fokker "borrowed" the first production-model aircraft - a VF-1S that would remain his mount for the rest of his life, and become Rick Hunter's aircraft after his death - to thwart an Anti-Unification plot to destroy the three primary symbols of UEG power. Officially, the first combat of the VF-1 was, like Macross, February 7, 2009, during the Battle of Macross Island - the first battle of the First Robotech War. Much like its Macross counterpart, the VF-1 would remain in service for the remainder of the conflict.

=== Modes ===
The VF-1 is different from modern fighter aircraft in that it can transform into three different configurations or modes for different combat environments, and can perform the task of more than one fighting vehicle: In Fighter mode it can act as a jet fighter or a space fighter; in GERWALK (or Guardian in Robotech) mode it acts as a VTOL unit or a "chicken walker" mecha; in Battroid mode (or Battloid in Robotech) it acts as a humanoid mecha.

==== Fighter mode ====
1/48 scale VF-1S Strike Valkyrie (Fighter mode) by Yamato Toys

The VF-1's Fighter mode is its basic mode and is the typical mode employed when the craft is parked at a military base and is the primary mode used in high altitude aerial combat planetside and in space combat.

In this mode, it features a basic fuselage similar to the real-world F-14 Tomcat jet fighter, including underslung intakes and variable-sweep wing, but with outward-canted vertical stabilizers similar to the F/A-18 Hornet's, swiveling under-wing hardpoints (last seen on the F-111 Aardvark, Su-24 Fencer, and Panavia Tornado), and a total lack of tailplanes. It is armed with 1, 2, or 4 (depending on model) Mauler RÖV-20 laser cannons mounted on a ventral turret, a GU-11 55mm three-barrelled gun pod holding 200 rounds, four underwing hardpoints holding up to twelve medium-range AMM-1 missiles, twelve Mk-82 LDGP bombs, six RMS-1 large anti-ship reaction missiles or four UUM-7 micro-missile pods containing up to 15 Bifors HMM-01 "micro-missiles". Like most of the VF-1's nomenclature, the "GU" and "AMM" designations of its weapons are references to current US military designations (GPU for Gun Pod Unit and AIM for Air Intercept Missile).

In fighter mode the VF-1's thermonuclear engines and the several vernier rockets on its fuselage make it capable of operating as an aerospace fighter. It can reach a maximum speed of Mach 3.87 at high altitude (above 30,000 m (98,000 ft)), and Mach 2.71 at medium altitude (10,000 m (33,000 ft)). Its wings, similar to those of the F-14 Tomcat, sweep between 20 degrees back and 72 degrees back. Unlike the F-14, the wings can sweep 90 degrees back for storage, with the tail module folding up over the fighter's back. Although the VF-1 technically has an unlimited service ceiling and atmospheric range (since it can operate in space), the VF-1's internal tanks cannot carry enough propellant to achieve a stable orbit and needs the help of a booster pack to reach Low Earth Orbit.

While in fighter mode, the VF-1 can also be equipped with a FAST (Fuel And Sensor Tactical) Pack space booster and weaponry system. This system vastly improves the speed and survivability of the fighter as well as giving it access to extra ammunition. The FAST pack isn't adapted for atmospheric use, due to its impact on a Valkyrie's aerodynamics and its weight; as such, it needs to be discarded before atmospheric entry. Contrary to the GBP-1S (see below), the FAST pack doesn't prevent transformation.

Fighter mode has two sub-modes:

- In atmospheric mode the engine air intakes are open; wings geometry is flexible.
- In space mode the engine air intakes are closed. Wings remain extended but fixed due to the presence of vernier thrusters on the wing tips, and wing-carried ordnance.

The shield that covers the cockpit in Battroid mode is usually absent, except on pilot's request for use as a heat shield, for example in case of atmospheric re-entry (seen performed in the original Macross series in episode 27).

==== GERWALK mode ====
GERWALK mode

In GERWALK (Ground Effective Reinforcement of Winged Armament with Locomotive Knee-joint) mode (called "Guardian Mode" in Robotech), the VF-1 looks like the nose and wings of a fighter plane stuck on "chicken walker" legs with two arms. The legs are formed by the aircraft's engines and intakes, bent down and forward. The arms are stored between the engines in fighter mode and fold out to the sides, reaching around from behind the legs. In GERWALK mode, the gun pod is held by the fighter's manipulator "hands" and acts in all respects as a very large automatic rifle. This mode is the intermediate one which was originally intended to simply allow the craft to land in a combat zone with a maximum of defensive ability. However, many pilots soon realized that this mode's considerable maneuverability combined with its speed made it formidable in low level aerial combat as well as when making flanking maneuvers on the ground, and most took advantage of these characteristics for such situations. Valkyrie pilots also have the option to deploy the legs alone, leaving the arms in storage.

According to an article in Animerica magazine, the form came about partially by accident. Early in the development cycle for Macross, the creators planned a main mecha called "GA-WALK", with an ostrich-like leg configuration (similar to the enemy battle pods from the finished series). However, the idea met with resistance from the initial sponsor, which wanted a more conventional robot for the hero to pilot. When creator Shoji Kawamori designed the transforming "Breast Fighters" (later redesigned and renamed the "VF-1 Valkyrie" fighters) instead, he had no real thoughts of a third mode. But when the manufacturer Takatoku Toys sent along the prototype of a Valkyrie toy for his input, the prototype's legs were not yet locked into place in Fighter mode, causing the legs to swing down. This was reminiscent to him of the discarded "GA-WALK" mecha idea that had been shot down early in pre-production. He liked the idea, and worked to incorporate the third mode, now renamed "GERWALK," into Macross. In GERWALK mode, the VF-1 has a maximum speed of 500 km/h (310 mph) flying, 100 km/h (62 mph) walking.

==== Battroid mode ====
Battroid mode

In Battroid mode (called "Battloid Mode" in Robotech), the VF-1 looks like a fighter airplane folded up to resemble a 12.7-meter-tall (42-foot-tall) humanoid. The legs are now straight and bend in the normal direction; the sides of the nose now resemble a human chest and shoulders (where the arms attach), and the laser turret is now a head.

While the Battroid mode has some limited altitude control, its primary purpose is for ground hand-to-hand combat, which enabled Earth forces to fight the giant alien invaders on their own scale as the military had anticipated they would need. As shown in the original TV series, this mode allowed the humans to disguise their VF-1 as a Zentradi officer and to infiltrate one of their warships during a rescue operation. The VF-1 valkyrie in battroid mode is also much stronger than the average Zentradi soldier and is able to defeat them in unarmed combat with ease. However, the superior size, physical strength, endurance and resistance to space vacuum of Commander Type Zentradi makes them much more dangerous and equal opponents for the Valkyrie.

In Battroid mode, the VF-1 has a maximum airspeed of 220 km/h (140 mph). Its maximum running speed is 160 kilometres per hour (99 mph). In this mode, the Valkyrie can also be equipped with a reactive armor package called the GBP-1S Ground Battle Protector weapon system. Manufactured by Shinnakasu Heavy Industries this pack is armed with fifty-six 28 cm (11 in) diameter Erlikon GH-32 Grenade Crusher high maneuverability micro-missiles (twenty-two mounted in two shoulder launchers, ten mounted in two chest launchers, sixteen mounted in side leg launchers, and eight mounted in rear leg launchers), eighteen Erlikon GA-100 Crusher high-speed armor-penetrating projectiles mounted in two lower arm launchers, and six Remington H-22T large hand grenades mounted on torso. This armor pack has to be ejected to allow the Valkyrie's transformation into GERWALK and Fighter modes.

=== Variants ===
The VF-1 Valkyrie is a variable geometry aerospace fighter built in four main variants. The four models differ slightly in engines, avionics, and armament:

- VF-1A: a standard soldier's fighter. Has one laser cannon on its head.
- VF-1D: a two-seat variant of the VF-1A. Has two lasers. (Used as a trainer in Robotech).
- VF-1J: a team leader/squadron commander's fighter. Has two lasers.
- VF-1S: a squadron commander/Commander Air Group's fighter. Has four lasers.
- VF-1R: a variation of the VF-1A as a mid-life upgrade to improve survivability. It features powerplant and armor upgrades, as well as an additional pulse cannon mounted as a third cannon on the head which will automatically target incoming missiles without pilot input and free up the pilot's mind for more important tasks. Originally thought to be an animation mistake in Episode 32, but Harmony Gold capitalized on it in the 2000s to introduce a new character (Jack Archer from the Robotech: Battlecry video game) and model.
- VT-1: a two-seat unarmed primary trainer (Macross only).
- There are several less frequently used variants.

==== Macross variants ====
Information listed here is only canon for the Macross continuity. This list is incomplete.

| Model | Description | Origin |
|---|---|---|
| VF-1A | Basic model. Fitted with a single Mauler RÖV-20 anti-aircraft laser cannon. | SDF:Macross Ep. 1 |
| VF-1D | Two-seat model capable of mounting armament. Fitted with a head unit with twin sets of optics and two anti-aircraft laser cannons. | SDF:Macross Ep. 1 |
| VF-1J | Model used by team or squadron leaders. License-produced by Shinnakasu Heavy Industries. First model capable of using the GBP-1S Armored unit. Fitted with twin anti-aircraft laser cannons. | SDF:Macross Ep. 1 (minor)/ SDF:Macross Ep. 6 (major) |
| VF-1S | Squadron commander variant. Fitted with enhanced-thrust FF-2001D engines and four anti-aircraft laser cannons. | SDF:Macross Ep. 1 |
| VT-1 "Super Ostrich" | Unarmed dedicated trainer model. | Macross: Do You Remember Love? |
| VE-1 "ELINT Seeker" | Unarmed ELINT variant based on a VT-1 airframe. | Macross: Do You Remember Love? |
| VF-1EX | Trainer model with upgraded avionics, an EX-Gear system, and an A.I. system that can be remotely overridden by a trainer unit. | Macross Delta EP. 3 |

==== Robotech variants ====
Models referenced here are only from the Robotech continuity. This list is incomplete.

| Model | Description | Origin |
|---|---|---|
| VF-1S | The original prototype, upgraded to include the battloid mode. Featuring stronger engines, and 4 head lasers, the model was meant for use by senior officers | Robotech Ep. 1 |
| VF-1A | The standard fighter for RDF pilots, this fighter was identifiable by its single head laser. This was the most common variant and meant for the equivalent of the enlisted ranks of the pilots | Robotech Ep. 1 |
| VF-1J | A variant for junior officers. The most famous example of this variant is Rick Hunter's first white Veritech, which he piloted before Roy Fokker's death. This variant has 2 head lasers, one situated on each side of the head while in Battloid mode. | Robotech Ep. 1 |
| VF-1R | A variant for the standard fighters. Designed as a stop-gap between current and the advanced veritech design eventually replacing VF-1A/1J in service. This fighter had three head lasers. | Robotech Ep. 32 |
| VT-1D | Two-seat trainer model capable of mounting armament. Fitted with a head unit with twin sets of optics and two anti-aircraft laser cannons. | Robotech Ep. 1 |

== Replicas ==
=== Toys ===
==== Takatoku Toys/Bandai ====
In 1983, Takatoku Toys released a range of Macross toys. Their first release was the 1/55 VF-1 Battroid Valkyrie, which was the first fully transformable replica of the VF-1. The toy was licensed by Hasbro for release in their markets as part of the Transformers toyline, and was retooled to become the character Jetfire. Due to Hasbro licensing the toy, Matchbox was unable to release it as part of the Robotech toyline (instead, Matchbox opted to release a semi-transformable version scaled to fit a 3 3/4" action figure with the Valkyrie/Veritech's proportions selectively compressed). Takatoku released the smaller 1/100 VF-1S Battroid Valkyrie later in the same year. In 1984, Bandai acquired the molds of the Valkyrie toy from Matsushiro Toys (which had obtained them from a bankrupt Takatoku Toys months prior) and used them as the basis for a new range. To coincide with the release of the film Macross: Do You Remember Love?, Bandai released the 1/55 Hi-Metal VF-1A Valkyrie with the newer paint scheme used by Hikaru Ichijyo. This was followed in the same year by the VT-1 Super Ostrich and VE-1 ELINT Seeker, as well as the VF-1S Strike Valkyrie.

Throughout the years, Bandai has reissued the 1/55 VF-1 Valkyrie toy line in Japan during anniversary celebrations of the Macross franchise - most recently in 2008 as part of Macross's 25th anniversary and the launch of Macross Frontier.

In 2010, Bandai released an all-new transformable 1/100 VF-1 Valkyrie toy under their VF Hi-Metal line.

==== Yamato Toys/Arcadia ====
In 2001, Yamato Toys released their 1/60 VF-1 Valkyrie line. Two years later, they unveiled their 1/48 scale Valkyrie, which went into production until 2007 with limited reissues in 2010. In 2008, Yamato used design and engineering cues from the 1/48 line to release newer versions of their 1/60 line. An unpainted, unassembled kit version of their 1/60 VF-1S Valkyrie was released in 2010. This kit is targeted to collectors who are into customizing their Valkyrie collection.

In 2009, Yamato Toys released their Valkyrie Battroid figures on their GN-U Dou line to compete with Kaiyodo's Revoltech figures. Despite being non-transformable, these figures boast exceptional articulation and poseability.

In 2013, Yamato Toys was restructured into Arcadia. The company is in the process of reissuing their 1/60 VF-1 Valkyrie replicas.

==== Toynami ====
In 2002, Toynami released a Robotech Masterpiece Collection range of products. Included in this range was a series of fully transformable VF-1 models in collector's packaging. Following the end of the Macross Saga of the Masterpiece Collection, Toynami released 1/100 scale VF-1 toys in 2006 that were marketed as Macross toys rather than Robotech toys. This lineup also included the Do You Remember Love? variants. These toys were released mainly for the North American market.

==== Kaiyodo ====
Kaiyodo released a series of VF-1 Valkyrie Battroid figures on their Revoltech line in 2006. Despite not being transformable, these figures boast extreme points of articulation and poseability. Transformable versions of the Revoltech VF-1 Valkyrie figures were released in early 2010. These figures are currently being offered in the United States by Harmony Gold USA through Robotech.com.

==== ThreeZero ====
ThreeZero released the fully transformable VF-1J and VF-1S figures as part of Robo-Dou line under license from Harmony Gold USA and Crunchyroll.

=== Model kits ===
During the run of the original Macross series, model kits of the VF-1 Valkyrie were released in Japan by Arii, Imai, and Nichimo. Most of these were non-transformable and required glue and paint to assemble, but variable types were also released in 1/100 and 1/72 scale. These transformed into all three modes, but required swapping the front fuselage for Battroid mode. Many of these kits were imported into the U.S. by Revell under the Robotech Defenders line. When Imai went out of business, the molds of their Macross model kits were acquired by Bandai, who reissued the kits throughout the 1990s. In 1999, Arii released the 1/24 scale VF-1S Valkyrie fighter kit, which is the largest scale replica of the Valkyrie to date.

In 2001, Big West commissioned Hasegawa Corporation to manufacture new 1/72 model kits of the VF-1. As Hasegawa's products are geared towards more experienced modelers, their Valkyrie kits are very accurately detailed. Since the VF-1, Hasegawa has released kits of variable fighters from most of the other Macross series as well.

In 2013, Bandai released an all-new 1/72 scale transforming kit of the VF-1 Valkyrie to celebrate the 30th anniversary of Macross. Unlike previous transforming kits, this model is capable of perfect transformation without the need of swapping parts. In addition, the transformation to Battroid mode utilizes retractable actuators that are accurate to the original line art.

== See also ==
- Space Gundam V – a Korean animated series featuring the VF-1J Valkyrie
