= The Super Dimension Fortress Macross: Flash Back 2012 =

Japanese original video animation

- Japanese DVD cover
- Genre: Drama, Mecha, Military Sci-Fi
- Created by: Studio Nue
- Original video animation
- Directed by: Shoji Kawamori
- Music by: Kentarō Haneda
- Studio: Tatsunoko Production
- Licensed by: Big West (licensing) Disney Platform Distribution (worldwide streaming license)
- Released: 21 June 1987
- Runtime: 30 minutes

The Super Dimension Fortress Macross: Flash Back 2012 (超時空要塞マクロス Flash Back 2012, Chō Jikū Yōsai Makurosu Furasshu Bakku 2012) is a 1987 collection of music videos from Super Dimension Fortress Macross animated television series (1982–1983) and the Macross: Do You Remember Love? theatrical film remake (1984). Released to commemorate the fifth anniversary of the series, it also contains several minutes of new footage that depicted story-events that were initially planned, but not animated for the endings of the television series (the launch of the Megaroad colonization ship captained by Misa Ichijyo), and the film (the final concert on Earth for Lynn Minmay). Preliminary designs were created for these story events in the production of the earlier works, but Flash Back 2012 was the first time that these events were animated (The earlier preliminary designs were replaced with new designs by the original director/mechanical designer Shoji Kawamori, original character designer Haruhiko Mikimoto, and original mechanical designer Kazutaka Miyatake). The premise of the collection is a farewell concert by Lynn Minmay, who is leaving the Earth on its first long-distance colony vessel, Megaroad-01.

== SDF-2 Megaroad-01 ==
It was designed by Mechanical Designer Kazutaka Miyatake.

In the fictional setting of Macross, the SDF-2 Megaroad-01 was initially slated to be the second Macross-class Super Dimension Fortress space battleship, but went on to become the first long-distance Megaroad-class colony ship.

A completely indigenous ship design based on feedback gleaned from 'Over-Technology' found on the "ASS-1" (later rechristened SDF-1 Macross) and the needs of Earth's forces, the completed SDF-2 Megaroad-01 is vastly different in size, hull design and capacity for war. Also, unlike the SDF-1 Macross, Megaroad-class colony ships lack modular transformation as its designers deemed it unnecessary after realising and overcoming the many problems that so plagued the SDF-1 following its launch. Command of the Megaroad-01 was given to war hero Misa Hayase Ichijyo. Aboard the fleet were her husband, Hikaru Ichijyo, leading the entire Skull group, and the famous idol singer Lynn Minmay.

The Megaroad-01 set out towards the center of the galaxy in 2012. However, in July 2016, barely four years into its voyage toward the center of the Milky Way, all contact with the fleet abruptly ceased. This information was never made known to the general public for fear it would jeopardize all ongoing and subsequent colonization efforts. The many victories and momentous events involving Minmay and the Skull Team during the Space War have been played up over and again to the point of legend ever since, just so everyone not already in the know would believe Megaroad-01 and its fleet are still in active contact with Command. A direct result of this is the release of the film "Super Dimension Fortress Macross: Do You Remember Love" in 2031 to remind the masses of the fragile peace they now enjoy with themes like the near extinction of humanity and some of the momentous events leading up to the end of War with the Zentradi and ending with 'Actual' footage of Minmay's Goodbye Concert Tour.

The name Megaroad originated in a pre-production name for the first Macross series, namely "Battle City Megaroad". This pre-production name was written as a deliberate wordplay on "Megaroad" (a long journey through space) and "Megaload" (a massive cargo in the form of a civilian city). After the first Macross series went into production, an additional wordplay, "Megalord," was considered for the second super dimension fortress before the name SDF-2 Megaroad-01 was finalized. There were plans for a splashy ending to the original Macross series, one that would have shown Misa Hayase and Hikaru Ichijyo blasting off in the SDF-2 ship, but the sequence was scrapped due to lack of time and budget. Due to fan demand this sequence was later used in the Macross Flashback 2012 OVA (1987). However, the Macross Perfect Memory Japanese reference book for the original series that was released in 1983 includes a profile and artwork for the first SDF-2 "Megalord" design.
