= Lynn Minmay =

Fictional character from the Macross franchise

- Macross character
- First appearance: Super Dimension Fortress Macross episode 1: "Boobytrap"
- Voiced by: Mari Iijima

Lynn Minmay (Japanese: リン・ミンメイ Rin Minmei, Chinese: 鈴明美 / 林明美 Líng Míngměi / Lín Míngměi) is a fictional anime character from the Macross franchise who has been considered the first fictional character to do well as a Japanese idol in the real world music industry. She is also in the Macross: Flash Back 2012 music video collection. The first Macross series and its Minmay character were adapted as the first part of the Robotech television series. Minmay is the embodiment of the music that plays a crucial role in setting Macross apart; as such, she has become the iconic character of that series.

In Macross (and Robotech), Minmay is a love interest of the main character, Hikaru Ichijyo (Rick Hunter in Robotech), and becomes an idol singer and film star on board the spacecraft SDF-1 Macross. Her songs, which cause confusion amongst alien Zentradi soldiers, play a critical role in Space War I against Boddole Zer's Zentradi fleet.

The original Japanese Minmay is voiced by Mari Iijima, who also wrote some of the songs and sang for the series. She became a famous J-pop singer in part due to the success of the series. Iijima has also undertaken to reprise the role in the English dub of the series for ADV. This would be the second time that a key character in an anime series was voiced by the same voice actor in both Japanese and English.

Minmay is of Japanese and Chinese descent. Her father Lynn Paochun (鈴宝雄 Líng Bǎoxióng) is Chinese and her mother Shigeyo (しげよ) is Japanese. An English translation of the Chinese characters in Lynn Minmay's name is "bright and beautiful bell". The localizers of Macross in Chinese-speaking territories changed the character 鈴 (Líng, "bell") for her family name to 林 (Lín "grove"). To some extent, the morale raised by Lynn Minmay in Space War I is very reminiscent of Vera Lynn during the Second World War.

== Fictional biography ==
Born in Yokohama Chinatown, Japan, Lynn Minmay moved in with her uncle Shaochin (少江) and aunt Feichun (慧中) on South Ataria Island in hopes of finding the path to fulfill her dream of becoming a star. On the day of the Zentradi invasion, she meets Hikaru and a series of events leads to her being swept off on the SDF-1 Macross along with the rest of the surviving population from that island. While on the space fortress, Minmay wins the Miss Macross beauty pageant and is propelled into celebrity.

When the Macross returns to Earth, she is the only civilian allowed off the space fortress. After her trip home in Japan (where her parents remained), Minmay returned to the fortress with her cousin Lynn Kaifun (and Hikaru's competition for her affection) in tow. Her beauty and singing talent also win over several Zentradi spies sent to explore human society, who spread their impressions among their fleetmates, thus unwittingly evoking peace-oriented attitudes among the alien aggressors. Ultimately, Minmay sings the songs that end the first war against the Zentradi.

During the second part of the series, the very fame and success she craved finally left her tired and virtually alone. She tries to run away from her celebrity status and start anew, with a more simple life alongside Hikaru, who is now more confused than ever in defining his feelings for Minmay and Misa Hayase; all of this while new conflicts arise between the human and Zentradi survivors of the first war. At the end of the series both Hikaru and Minmay realize they are very different people, and Minmay accepts that Hikaru belongs with Misa, remaining a friend to the couple afterwards.

In 2012, Minmay sits among the thousands of seats in the empty stadium where her last concert was held. She walks up the stairs to the stage and plays Angel's Paints on the piano. As the music starts up again, she sees Hikaru in a pilot suit. He hands her a microphone, right after the costume she wore during the concert appears on her, she is greeted by Misa. Years earlier, Minmay packed her bags for South Ataria Island. Before leaving she saw photos of her and her family on a touchscreen photo frame, and had a minor argument with her parents. After venturing through a busy street, Minmay put her bag down by a wall and saw a poster promoting the SDF-1, now in 2012 she stands with her suitcase in the same location, the poster has been replaced with one promoting the SDF-2 Megaroad-01. Misa has been promoted to the rank of Captain and given command of the SDF-2 while her Husband, Hikaru, pilots the newest variable fighter, the VF-4 Lightning III. Minmay waves goodbye to the crowd as the SDF-2 launches, and the visage of a younger Minmay seeing her current self off appears. The SDF-2 rises above the landscape of Macross City With the approval of Captain Misa Ichijō, Skull Leader Hikaru flies vertically in his VF-4. Many variable fighters and a Nupetiet-Vergnitzs-class Battleship fly together as part of the SDF-2 Megaroad-01's fleet past the moon. She embarks on the SDF-2 Megaroad-01 colony ship (along with Misa and Hikaru, who remained as her friends and also boarded the ship), which disappears 4 years later in 2016 during its voyage towards the center of the Milky Way galaxy, becoming a legend in the Macross universe since then.

== Additional notes on the character ==
Minmay's personality is that of any teenage girl, fun-loving, playful, full of dreams and hopes that she may realize some day. After their initial encounter during the start of the Space War I, Hikaru develops a deep infatuation for her that grows on and on throughout the series. But after Minmay wins the Miss Macross contest and becomes a distant pop idol, his feelings for her change, as she becomes too involved not only in the popular culture, but as a symbol of the human struggle against the Zentradi. Minmay also displays insecurity and doubts about her attraction toward Hikaru and her cousin Lynn Kaifun.

Minmay as she appears in The Super Dimension Fortress Macross: Flash Back 2012

In the film Macross: Do You Remember Love?, Minmay's portrayal was a bit different from the first Macross series. In the movie's story, she was already a popular singer and movie star, and she and Hikaru had never met before until the events that occur in the movie. Hikaru is portrayed as a Valkyrie pilot who is a Minmay fan, and apparently falls for her after their meeting; Minmay, for her part, already tired of living in the eye of the media, initially befriends Hikaru after he saves her life, and she sees him as a friend from the outside of the crazy world of fame she has been living. As the plot evolves, she also begins to fall for him, yet it is too late, as Hikaru realizes he loves Misa, and his fascination for Minmay was just that and nothing more.

In the epilogue to the series the OVA Super Dimension Fortress Macross: Flash Back 2012, that takes place in 2012, where Minmay sits alone in an empty stadium where her last concert was held. She reflects on her life and accepts how happy Hikaru and Misa are together. She departs on SDF-2 Megaroad-01 colony ship, which is captained by Misa and guarded by Hikaru, who both remain as her friends. (The couple invited her after her final concert to help them spread humanity's First Deep-Space Colonization Effort.)

It is revealed that after the war, Minmay's fame wanes, and she struggles with her identity and public life. While in the stadium, she reflects on her life, as she walks up the stairs to the stage and plays Angel's Paints on the piano. As the music starts up again, she sees Hikaru in a pilot suit. He hands her a microphone, Right after the costume she wore during the concert appears on her, she is greeted by Misa. The two invited her to come with them to the stars. She accepted and packed her bags for South Ataria Island. Before leaving, she saw photos of her and her family on a touchscreen photo frame and had a minor argument with her parents. After venturing through a busy street, Minmay put her bag down by a wall and saw a poster promoting the SDF-1, now in 2012 she stands with her suitcase in the same location; the poster has been replaced with one promoting the SDF-2 Megaroad-01. Misa has been promoted to the rank of Captain and given command of the SDF-2 while her Husband, Hikaru, pilots the newest variable fighter, the VF-4 Lightning III. Minmay waves goodbye to the crowd as the SDF-2 launches, and the visage of a younger Minmay seeing her current self off appears.

Lynn Minmay's piano scene in Flash Back 2012 is a poignant moment of reflection and closure. Sitting alone in an empty concert hall, she plays the piano while imagining Hikaru Ichijyo and Misa Hayase together, symbolizing her acceptance that Hikaru chose Misa over her. The empty hall represents her loneliness, contrasting with her once-glorious fame. Her song Angel's Paints, also called Tenshi no Enogu, reflects nostalgia, lost love, and moving forward. This scene marks the end of the love triangle and shows Minmay's emotional growth, preparing her for her final departure aboard Megaroad-01, leaving her past behind.

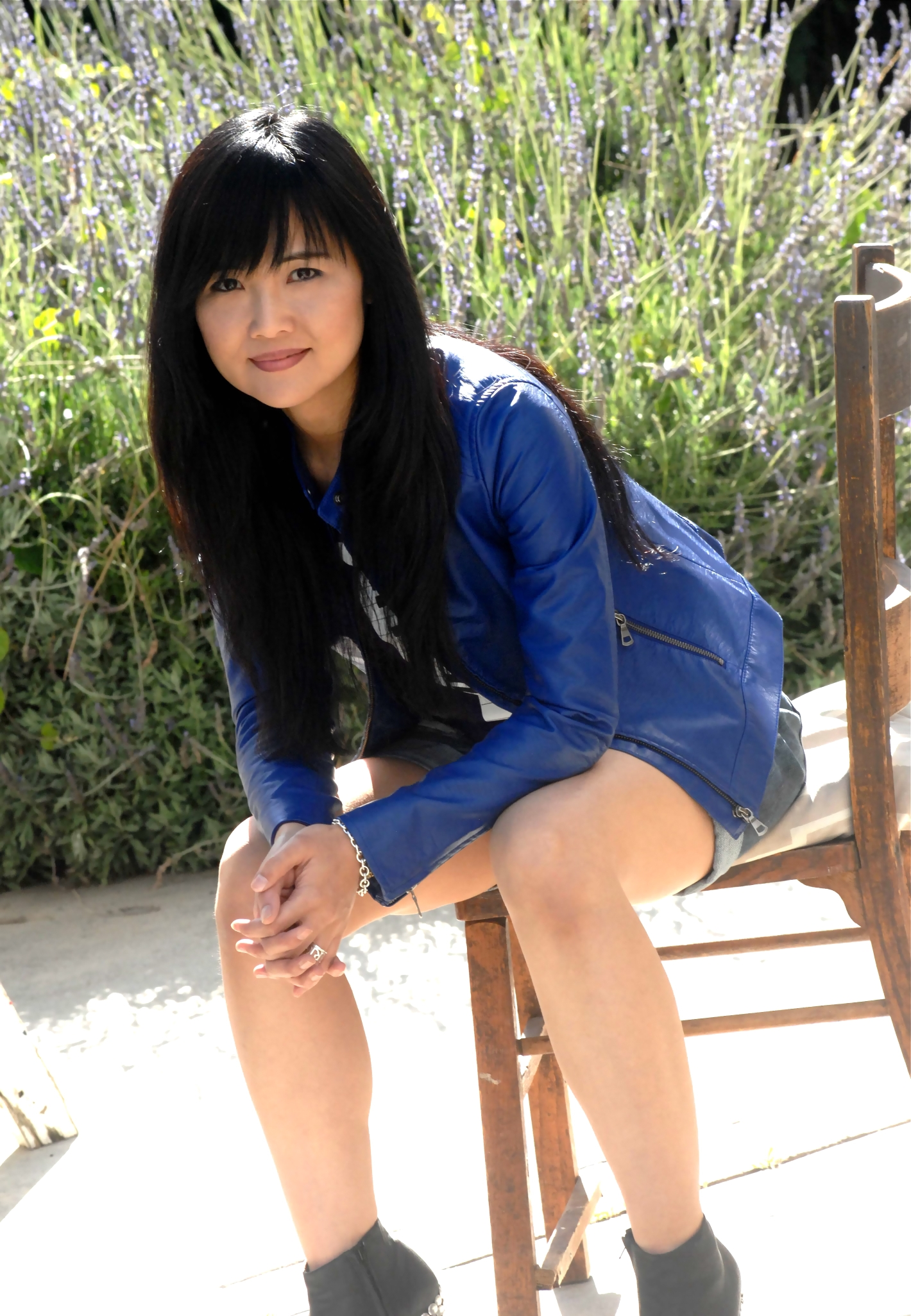
Mari Iijima provided the voice of Minmay in the original Japanese as well as on the 2006 Macross English dub by ADV.

Her hit songs include "My Boyfriend's a Pilot," "Little White Dragon," and "Do You Remember Love?" The first song that Minmay sings, "Cinderella" in Episode 4, was not written for the show. Instead, the song had been written by Iijima prior to being picked for the role of Minmay. The fact that she was a songwriter was one of the factors that led to her being cast in the film. Coincidentally, the very last song that Minmay would sing in a Macross animated production, "An Angel's Paints" (天使の絵の具 Tenshi no Enogu) from the Do You Remember Love? movie and Flash Back 2012 video, was also written by Iijima.

Macross creators Mikimoto Haruhiko and Kawamori Shoji have stated that Minmay's popularity in both sides of the war is partially inspired by the song Lili Marleen, a German love song which was popular on both sides during World War II.

== Legacy ==
In the Macross world, Minmay continues to be remembered decades after Space War I. Her songs are constantly cherished and she will always be known as the girl who ended a war by singing. In every Macross sequel (even the non-canon Macross II OVA and movie), Minmay is referred to either indirectly (through references of her songs) or explicitly.

In Macross 7, she became an inspiration to Basara Nekki, who intends to win over his enemies with song. In Macross 7 Trash, there is a singing contest called "Voice Minmay 2046" to transform the winner in the new version of Minmay. Likewise, the winner and co-star of the story, Enika Chelini, is a fan of Minmay. In Macross Frontier her song "My Boyfriend's a Pilot", sung by Ranka Lee during a Miss Macross Frontier competition, was referred to as "a legendary song every person here knows". The final bars of "My Boyfriend's a Pilot" are heard in Macross Plus when Myung Fan Lone is taken by old schoolmates to a karaoke lounge.

Ranka Lee can also be seen as the "new" Minmay. Both of them are playful, insecure, young teenage girls who pursue their singing dreams. Minmay and Ranka both have Chinese names and they both worked at the Nyan Nyan restaurant. In the final episode of Macross Frontier, a picture of Minmay can be seen in a locket belonging to a Zentradi mogul called Richard Bilrer.

== Virtual idol ==
In addition to portraying Minmay as a popular singer within her setting, the Macross franchise released music under Lynn Minmay's name as if she performed it (Mari Ijima voiced Minmay). Haruhiko Mikimoto, who designed Minmay, modeled her after Seiko Matsuda, a Japanese idol who was popular at the time and known for affecting a cutesy persona. Minmay's most popular release was the 1984 "Do You Remember Love?" (the theme song of the movie Macross: Do You Remember Love?), which reached number seven on the Oricon music chart. Communication studies scholar Jiahui Liu called Minmay the "first virtual idol". According to Kotaku writer Richard Eisenbeis, Minmay was the "first fictional singer to garner major real world success".

== Works cited ==
- Eisenbeis, Richard (September 7, 2012). "The Fictional (Yet Amazingly Popular) Singers of Japan". Kotaku.
- Galbraith, Patrick W. (2021). "Idol Economics: Television, Affective and Virtual Models in Japan". In Aoyagi, Hiroshi; Galbraith, Patrick W.; Kovacic, Mateja (eds.). Idology in Transcultural Perspective: Anthropological Investigations of Popular Idolatry. Palgrave Macmillan. pp. 65–89. doi:10.1007/978-3-030-82677-2_4. ISBN 978-3-030-82676-5.
- Liu, Jiahui (2023). "Virtual Presence, Real Connections: Exploring the Role of Parasocial Relationships in Virtual Idol Fan Community Participation". Special Issue: Human–Machine Communication Cultures: Artificial Intelligence, Media and Cultures in a Global Context. Global Media and China: 1–22. doi:10.1177/20594364231222976.
- Macross Perfect Memory. Tokyo, Japan: Minori Shobō. 10 October 1983.
- Masataka, Yoshida (2016). "On Two-dimensional Cute Girls: Virtual Idols". In Galbraith, Patrick W.; Karlin, Jason G. (eds.). Media Convergence in Japan. Kinema Club. pp. 144–168.
