= List of Macross video games =

This is a list of Macross video games. Even though some of these games have only been released in Japan rather than abroad (where the Macross franchise has also been licensed by Harmony Gold as Robotech) they extend the franchise with noticeable key elements such as original animation scenes, characters and mecha known as Valkyries.Due to the vast number of platforms, this list sorts video games by chronological order instead of systems, supports or genres. Official crossover video games are part of the list, yet unofficial hobbyist-made freeware applications and licensed non-game applications are not listed.

The following list is presented as such:

- original release date, international title, (platform)

(original title, pronunciation help), maker, publisher, support

short description of the game with the genre, related series and story.

== 1980s ==
- 1983.XX: The Super Dimension Fortress Macross (Arcadia)

(超時空要塞マクロス, Chō Jikū Yōsai Macross), Bandai, ROM cartridge

- 1984.XX: Miss Macross (FM-7/PC-8801/PC-8801 Mk.II)

(ミスマクロス, Misu Makurosu), Technopolis Soft, Cassette tape

- 1984.XX: The Super Dimension Fortress Macross Countdown (X1 Turbo/FM-7/MSX/MSX2/PC-8801)

(超時空要塞マクロス カウントダウン, Chō Jikū Yōsai Makurosu Kauntodaun), Bothtec, Alex Bros, Cassette tape/Floppy disk/ROM cartridge

- 1985.XX: Macross: SF Challenge Game (Laserdisc game)

(超時空要塞マクロス SFチャレンジゲーム, Chō Jikū Yōsai Makurosu Esu Efu Chyarenji Gemu), Shogakukan, Toshiba-Emi, LaserDisc

- 1985.12: The Super Dimension Fortress Macross (Famicom)

(超時空要塞マクロス, Chō Jikū Yōsai Macross), Namco, Bandai, ROM cartridge

A 2D sidescrolling shooter game released in 1985 for the Famicom and MSX computers by Namco and Bandai. The main objectives of the lone Valkyrie are to battle Zentradi forces, penetrate the Zentradi's Nupetiet Vergnitzs flagship, and destroy it. A simplified MIDI rendition of the song "Shao Pai Long" is the game's only background music.

== 1990s ==
- 1992.XX: Super Spacefortress Macross (video game) (Arcade)

(超時空要塞マクロス, Chō Jikū Yōsai Macross), NMK, Banpresto/Fabtek, ROM

This is one of the rare Macross games officially distributed in North America, it was licensed by Fabtek as "Super Spacefortress Macross" (instead of "The Super Dimension Fortress Macross"). There were three arcade games released by Banpresto during the 1990s, all of which were scrolling shooters: The Super Dimension Fortress Macross (1992), The Super Dimension Fortress Macross II (1993) and Macross Plus (1996). The first game follows the events of the Do You Remember Love? movie.

- 1992.04: The Super Dimension Fortress Macross 2036 (PC Engine CD-ROM²)

(超時空要塞マクロス2036, Chō Jikū Yōsai Makurosu 2036), Masaya/Nippon Computer System, CD-ROM

A 2D sidescrolling shooter released in April 1992 for the PC Engine Super CD-ROM² that occurs in the universe of The Super Dimension Fortress Macross II: Lovers, Again OVA. The game takes place 26 years after the end of Space War I, with Komilia Maria Fallyna Jenius as one of the protagonists.

- 1992.12: The Super Dimension Fortress Macross: Eternal Love Song (PC Engine CD-ROM²)

(超時空要塞マクロス 永遠のラヴソング, Chō Jikū Yōsai Makurosu Eien No Rabu Songu), Masaya/Nippon Computer System (especially Team Career), CD-ROM

A turn-based 2D strategy videogame released in December 1992 for the PC Engine Super CD-ROM² that follows the continuity of Macross II and is a sequel to Macross 2036.

- 1993.XX: Super Dimension Fortress Macross II (Arcade)

(超時空要塞マクロスII, Chō Jikū Yōsai Macross Tsū), NMK, Banpresto, ROM

- 1993.03: The Super Dimension Fortress Macross: Remember Me (PC-9801)

(超時空要塞マクロス -リメンバーミ-, Chō Jikū Yōsai Macross Rimembā Mi), Family Soft, Floppy disk

Turn-based strategy game.

- 1993.10: Super Dimension Fortress Macross: Scrambled Valkyrie (Super Famicom)

(超時空要塞マクロス スクランブルバルキリー, Chō Jikū Yōsai Makurosu Sukuranburu Barukiri), Winkysoft, Zamuse/Banpresto, ROM cartridge

A 2D sidescrolling shooter released in 1993 for the Nintendo Super Famicom and based on Do You Remember Love?. The story takes place after the movie, but before the launch of the SDF-2 Megaroad-01.

- 1994.05: The Super Dimension Fortress Macross: Skull Leader (PC-9801)

(超時空要塞マクロス スカルリーダー, Chō Jikū Yōsai Macross Sukaru Rīdā), Family Soft, Floppy disk

Turn-based strategy game.

- 1994.07: The Super Dimension Fortress Macross: Love Stories (PC-9801)

(超時空要塞マクロス ラブストーリーズ, Chō Jikū Yōsai Macross Rabu Sutōrīzu), Family Soft, Floppy disk

Turn-based strategy game.

- 1995.07: The Super Dimension Fortress Macross: Skull Leader Complete Pack (PC-9801)

(超時空要塞マクロス スカルリーダー・コンプリートパック, Chō Jikū Yōsai Macross Sukaru Rīdā Konpurīto Pakku), Family Soft, Floppy disk

Turn-based strategy game.

- 1996.XX: Macross Plus (Arcade)

(マクロスプラス, Makurosu Purasu) Moss, Banpresto, ROM

- 1997.02: Macross: Digital Mission VF-X (PlayStation)

(マクロス デジタルミッション ブイエフエックス, Makurosu Dejitaru Misshon Buiefu Ekkusu), UNiT, Bandai Visual, CD-ROM

The first ever 3D graphics and polygonal game of the franchise was made by Bandai Visual for the PlayStation in 1997. Set in 2047, the game focuses on a UN Spacy squadron assigned to rescue a girl band called the Milky Dolls. The game was re-released at a lower price as a PlayStation The Best Collection Series title in 1998.

- 1997.06: The Super Dimension Fortress Macross: Do You Remember Love (Sega Saturn/PlayStation/PlayStation 3)

(超時空要塞マクロス 愛・おぼえていますか, Chō Jikū Yōsai Makurosu Ai Oboete Imasuka), Scarabe, Bandai Visual, CD-ROM/Digital distribution

A 2D shooter created for the Sega Saturn in 1997 to celebrate the 15th anniversary of the Macross franchise, it was co-programmed by Sega and was later ported to the PlayStation in 1999 and the PlayStation 3 in 2012 (through digital download). It is closely based on the movie, with a mix of 2D and 3D action and special effects. The game's two CDs contained footage and soundtrack from both the Macross movie and Flashback 2012 as well as brand-new cutscenes. The intro cutscene, in particular, shows Hikaru and his fellow pilots just taking off the carrier Prometheus when a sudden Zentradi attack destroys the warship.

- 1998.10: The Super Dimension Fortress Macross: Macross since 1983 (Windows 95/Windows 98)

(超時空要塞マクロス Macross since 1983, Chō Jikū Yōsai Makurosu Macross Since 1983), Upstar, MediaKite CD-ROM

- 1999.09: Macross VF-X2 (PlayStation)

(マクロス ブイエフエックスツー, Makurosu Buiefu Ekkusu Tsū), UNiT, Bandai Visual, CD-ROM

Released for the PlayStation in 1999. The game is set three years after the events of VF-X. This was the only Macross game planned for an American release, but was canceled due to unknown reasons.

- 1999.12: Macross Another Story (Windows 95/Windows 98)

(マクロス アナザーストーリー, Makurosu Anaza Sutori), Upstar, Sofmap, CD-ROM

== 2000s ==
- 2000.02: Macross VF-X2: Special Version (PlayStation)

(マクロス ブイエフエックスツー スペシャルバージョン, Makurosu Biefu Ekkusu Tsu Supesharu Bashyon), UNiT, Tokyo Snack/Emotion, CD-ROM not for sale

- 2000.03: Macross 7: Let's Reveal The Galaxy's Heart!! (Game Boy Color)

(マクロス7 -銀河のハートを奮わせろ!!-, Makurosu sebun: Ginga No Hato o Furuwa Sero!!), Aisystem Tokyo, Epoch, ROM Cartridge

A 2D side-scrolling shooter released on the Game Boy Color in 2000. It features Macross 7's Fire Bomber band and their special Valkyries, plus some from the UN Spacy.

- 2000.03: Macross: True Love Song (WonderSwan)

(マクロス トゥルーラブソング, Makurosu Toru Rabu Songu), Layup, Upstar, ROM Cartridge

- 2000.06: Macross Plus: Game Edition (PlayStation)

(マクロスプラス -GAME EDITION-, Makurosu Purasu: Game Edition), Shoeisha, Takara/Takara Tomy, CD-ROM

Released for the PlayStation in 2000. It is based on Macross Plus, with cutscenes from the movie version included.

- 2001.02: Macross M3 (Dreamcast)

(マクロスM3, Makurosu M3), Shoeisha, GD-ROM

A 3D shooter released for the Dreamcast on February 22, 2001. M3 takes place around 2014, and covers the story of Maximilian Jenius, Milia Fallyna Jenius, and their adopted Meltlandi daughter Moaramia Fallyna Jenius (whose original name was Moaramia Jifon) as they continue to serve as Valkyrie pilots.

- 2001.06: The Super Dimension Macross VO (Windows 98/Windows ME)

(超時空要塞マクロス VO, Chō Jikū Yōsai Makurosu Bio), Bothtec, CD-ROM

A space combat simulator released in 2001 for the PC. It was compatible with Windows 95, 98 and ME. A Windows XP version was released (The Super Dimension Fortress Macross VOXP) in 2002. The game was unique in the fact that it enabled players to sortie online using the vehicles used by the different factions (Zentradi, Meltlandi and U.N. Spacy) featured in Macross DYRL.

- 2002.07: The Super Dimension Macross VOXP (Windows 98/Windows ME/Windows XP)

(超時空要塞マクロス VOXP, Chō Jikū Yōsai Makurosu Bio Ekusupi), Bothtec, CD-ROM

- 2002.07: The Super Dimension Macross: Aiuchi Typing Valkyrie (Windows 98/Windows ME/Windows 2000/Windows XP)

(超時空要塞マクロス 愛打 タイピングバルキリー, ''Chō Jikū Yōsai Makurosu Aiuchi Taipingu Barukiri), SSI Tristar, CD-ROM

- 2003.01: The Super Dimension Macross: Aiuchi 2 Typing Protoculture (Windows 98/Windows ME/Windows 2000/Windows XP)

(超時空要塞マクロス 愛打2 タイピングプロトカルチャー, Chō Jikū Yōsai Makurosu Aiuchi 2 Taipingu Purotokaruchya), SSI Tristar, CD-ROM

- 2003.04: The Super Dimension Macross (DoCoMo 504i/DoComo 504is)

(超時空要塞マクロス, ''Chō Jikū Yōsai Makurosu), Bothtec Mobile, Digital distribution

- 2003.10: The Super Dimension Fortress Macross (2003 video game) (PlayStation 2)

(超時空要塞マクロス, Chō Jikū Yōsai Makurosu), Sega AM2, Bandai, DVD-ROM

A full 3D shooter released by Sega-AM2 for the PlayStation 2 in 2003. The game features many familiar characters as well as new characters and all Valkyrie fighters featured in the TV series, the Macross DYRL movie and Macross Flashback 2012.

- 2008.10: Macross Ace Frontier (PlayStation Portable)

(マクロスエースフロンティア, Makurosu Esu Furontia), Artdink, Bandai Namco Games, UMD

- 2009.10: Macross Ultimate Frontier (PlayStation Portable)

(マクロスアルティメットフロンティア, Makurosu Arutimetto Furontia), Artdink, Bandai Namco Games, UMD

The sequel to Macross Ace Frontier that includes new mecha and levels based on the alternate continuity of Macross II as well as the previous Macross videogames. It was developed by Artdink and released by Namco Bandai in October 2009.

== 2010s ==
- 2010.10: Macross Trial Frontier (PlayStation 3)

(マクロストライアルフロンティア, Makurosu Toraiaru Furontia), Artdink, Bandai Namco, BD-ROM

- 2011.02: Macross Triangle Frontier (PlayStation Portable)

(マクロストライアングルフロンティア, Makurosu Toraianguru Furontia), Artdink, Bandai Namco Games, UMD

The sequel to Macross Ultimate Frontier, also developed by Artdink and released by Namco Bandai.

- 2011.10: Macross Last Frontier (PlayStation 3)

(マクロスラストフロンティア, Makurosu Rasuto Furontia), Artdink, Bandai Namco, BD-ROM

A PlayStation 3 release from Namco Bandai. Bundled as a Hybrid Disc along with the second Frontier movie, it recaps the 2 movies using an upscaled version of the PSP games assets and engine.

- 2012.07: Macross SP Cross Deculture (iOS 5/Android 2.3.6)

(マクロスSP クロスデカルチャー!!!, Makurosu SP Kurosu Dekarucha!!!), BNDeNA, Digital distribution

- 2012.07: My Boyfriend is a Pilot 2012 (PlayStation 3)

(私の彼はパイロット2012, Watashi No Kare Wa Pairotto 2012), Artdink, Bandai Namco, BD-ROM

A hybrid disc game similar to Last Frontier, recaps the events of DYRL using material from the PSP games.

- 2013.02: Macross 30: Voices across the Galaxy (PlayStation 3)

(マクロス30 銀河を繋ぐ歌声, Makurosu 30 Ginga Wo Tsunagu Utagoe), Artdink, Bandai Namco Games, BD-ROM

- An Action RPG game announced for 2013 to commemorate the 30th anniversary of Macross.

- 2014.02: Macross Card Fighter (iOS 3, Android 2.3)

(マクロスカードファイター, Makurosu Kado Faita), Bandai Namco Games, Digital distribution

- 2016.10: Macross Δ Scramble (PlayStation Vita)

(マクロスΔスクランブル), Bandai Namco Entertainment, Artdink, PS Vita Card

- 2017.08: Uta Macross Sma-Pho De-Culture (iOS, Android)

(歌マクロス スマホDeカルチャー), DeNA, Digital distribution

== Crossover ==
- 2000.05: Super Robot Wars Alpha (PlayStation/Dreamcast)

(スーパーロボット大戦α, Supa Robotto Taisen Alpha), Banpresto, Smilebit, CD-ROM/GD-ROM

- 2007.09: Another Century's Episode 3: The Final (PlayStation 2)

FromSoftware, Banpresto, DVD-ROM

== Cancelled ==
- Macross VF-X2 North American localization (PlayStation)

(マクロス ブイエフエックスツー, Makurosu Biefu Ekkusu Tsu), UNiT, Bandai Visual, CD-ROM

Localization process including English voice acting and the addition of an exclusive mecha had already started when the project was eventually cancelled. The unfinished game was still released by Tokyo Snack in a limited non-commercial promotion campaign title named Macross VF-X2: Special Version.

- The Super Dimension Fortress Macross: Another Dimension (Nintendo 64)

(超時空要塞マクロス アナザーディメンション, Chō Jikū Yōsai Makurosu Anaza Dimenshyon) GameTek, Tomy, ROM cartridge

Japanese localization of Robotech: Crystal Dreams to be done by video game company Tomy of Japan. Since most of the mecha used in Crystal Dreams came from the original Macross TV series (which provided a third of the animation for the Robotech cartoon series in the U.S.), Tomy saw the opportunity to have the only Macross game released on the Japanese N64. However, producer GameTek never completed the American game and closed down in 1998. In addition, though Tomy was interested in the game and even went as far as to advertise it in Japanese magazines, the company didn't obtain the rights to distribute a Macross game from Bandai.
