= Techno Police 21C =

1982 Japanese anime film

- Promotional poster for the film Techno Police 21C
- Directed by: Masashi Matsumoto
- Written by: Yoshimitsu Banno
- Production companies: Studio Nue; Wiz Corporation
- Distributed by: Toho
- Release date: 7 August 1982
- Running time: 79 minutes
- Country: Japan
- Language: Japanese

Techno Police 21C (テクノポリス21C(トウェンティワンセンチュリー), Tekunoporisu Tuentiwan-Senchurī), also known as simply Techno Police, is a 1982 Japanese mecha police anime film made by Wiz Corporation (later renamed Artmic) and released on 7 August 1982.

The anime film's premise involves an advanced robot police squad trying to recover a hijacked prototype tank.

== Synopsis ==
The plot consists of a chase of a hijacked MBT-99A tank, designed by the United States Air Force. The hijackers, who appear inside the tank after getting away from a recently committed bank robbery, were hired by a shadowy group backed by a foreign nation seeking an edge in their military. The tank carries six ATGM launchers, three to each side of the turret, and a laser-based machine-gun-esque installment, in addition to its rifled main gun. The tank's treads are dual-mounted (the tread is split in half, making four sets of treads for the tank).

Another tank involved is the MBT-90D, which are dispatched by the Army to take out the tank. Despite having at least a platoon of these, the MBT-99 still evades capture. The M-90Ds are armed with a three-barreled autocannon, three ATGM missile launchers and a main cannon, mounted on the front instead of on a turret.

The MBT-99's hijackers are forced out by Ken and his team. Eleanor then enters to study the tank, and it starts up on its own, having been programmed by the hijackers to head for a pier and drive off its end so as to rendezvous with an enemy submarine. The rest of the movie is made up of the chase through the city, resulting in the destruction of another bank and various collateral damage.

== Characters ==
Set at the start of the 21st century, its main character is Ken, a motorcycle-mounted highway patrolman in what is presumably the American Southwest, who is called to join the police force in Centinel City (the name comes from centennial, not sentinel), where he is only expected to last six months. He can be described as flighty, although as the movie progresses, he gets more serious. He is also known to wreck his motorcycles frequently in pursuit of criminals; he is shown in the beginning of the movie leaping from one onto a truck, and as the movie proper opens, his cycle is yet again trashed, barely making it to the station. Ken reports it to his chief as the twentyninth that month.

Ken's team consists of a woman named Eleanor and a husky male named Gora Kosaka (a feminine name) and who grows flowers. Each has a robot to direct for police work—not a Giant Robot that they would control from inside, but a robot that is crudely presented as stupid, as a computer has to be trained to do everything. Ken's, Blader, is blue and white and equipped with a projectile handcuff, much like C.O.P.S.' LongArm. Eleanor's, Scanny, is red and has a female figure, but whose face is composed entirely of blinking LEDs, and which has two cables streaming from the neck, which plug into computer sockets. Gora's robot, Vigobus, is bigger and stronger than the other two (at one point, it lifts the MBT-99A tank and keeps it immobile for several minutes with some strain). These robots ride in the back of a large, six-wheeled, roofless police car which is red and white. A trailer is attached to pull along Gora's robot. Ken sits in the middle to drive it, with Eleanor on his right and Kosaka on his left.

== Production staff ==
- Director: Masashi Matsumoto
- Concept Creator: Toshimichi Suzuki
- Writers: Hiroyuki Hoshiyama, Kenichi Matsuzaki, Masashi Matsumoto, Yoshimitsu Banno, Yuu Yamamoto
- Script Supervisor: Mamoru Sasaki
- Composer: Joe Hisaishi
- Theme Song Performance: Makoto Fujiwara
- Character Designs: Yoshitaka Amano
- Mechanical Designs: Studio Nue (Shouji Kawamori and Kazutaka Miyatake)
- Animation Directors: Kougi Ohkawa, Norio Hirayama
- Art Director: Geki Katsumata
- Producer: Michio Morioka
- Production: Toho Co. Ltd., Toho Eizou Co. Ltd., Studio Nue, Dragon Productions Co. Ltd.

== Development ==
Techno Police 21C started out life in 1978 as an idea from Artmic founder Toshimichi Suzuki. Work began on developing the idea into a TV series as a co-production between Artmic (then Wiz Corporation) and Studio Nue. The technology to be featured in the series was heavily researched with the intention of making the future as believable as possible.

Unfortunately, the project hit problems. After 4 years in development there was only enough animation produced for a single episode. The series was scrapped and, in order to recover some of the costs, the existing footage was compiled into an 80-minute movie and distributed by Toho.

Of the staff that worked on the aborted TV show, they involve Joe Hisaishi, who provides the synth-jazz score and is well known in the west for having created the score for nearly all Hayao Miyazaki movies including Spirited Away, Princess Mononoke and Nausicaa and Takeshi Kitano's (Sonatine, Hana-bi, Brother). Working as part of the animation staff is Shoji Kawamori who is now famous for his mecha designs particularly on the seminal Super Dimension Fortress Macross.

One point which marks the animation studio of this film is that to save money there are many scenes which are monochromatic. When the hijackers are in the vehicle they stole, everything on screen is blue; when Eleanor starts to drive it back, everything on screen is red. Another scene towards the beginning has the Techno Police headquarters in blue.

Undeterred by Technopolice's failure Toshimichi Suzuki returned to his original idea, some years later reworking it as the OAV series Bubblegum Crisis, which fared slightly better but in the end suffered a similar fate.

In 1983 Technopolice 21C was dubbed by those ubiquitous Hong Kong kung fu voice actors (see also Battle For Moon Station Dallos, Locke the Superpower, Leda: The fantastic Adventure of Yohko and Macross: Do you remember love?). The company responsible for the commissioning this new English track is unknown, they also made a few changes to the movie, moving the title card to the very start and pausing the individual shots of the opening credits to remove the Japanese text without shortening the running time or messing with the music. Also the end credits are missing entirely but otherwise the content of the movie itself is unchanged.

This English language version was released on video in the UK by Mountain Video (Frankenstein, Dracula, Mazinger Z) under the slightly shorter title Techno Police. With the advent of the 1984 Video Recordings Act the video was withdrawn from shelves and disappeared into obscurity never to be re-released.

Re-edited and redubbed scenes from Techno Police also appeared in Mountain Video's obscure Flash! No.1 Video Comic and its spin-off Flash! Robot Issue. These two tapes, released on VHS, Betamax and V-2000, were intended to advertise their collection of children's by collecting short clips of them together in a mock comic-book-on-video format. Both issues were released in 1983.

The American market would not get to see Blader (now known as just Blade) in action until 1987 when Techno Police found its way to the shelves thanks to Celebrity's Just For Kids label (Battle for Earth Station S/1, Revenge of the Ninja Warrior), and later from Best Film and Video. The Best Film and Video version is slightly less edited, featuring some mild swearing.

Outside of the English speaking world unedited video versions of Technopolice 21C were seen in France, Germany and Spain with a theatrical run in Cuba, which were dubbed using the English dub. In Bulgaria, the movie received two separate VHS releases, one by Bulgarian Video in 1989 and a re-issue with alternate cover art by Multi Video Center a few years later, both featuring the English dubbed version of the film with Bulgarian subtitles.

== Media ==
=== Anime ===
A VHS version was released in 1984 with a laser disc version in 1985.

A Blu-Ray remastered version was released in May 2018.

=== Figures ===
Scale model kit company Aoshima, in anticipation of the proposed TV show, had produced a number of tie-in plastic kits of Technopolice's vehicles and robots, including a few designs which never animated. These were still released, in hopes to make money from the movie instead. As well as 1/16 scale kits of the Techroids and 1/48 kits of the Mazurka, Temjin and Roadranger other items of merchandising included a soundtrack, on LP and cassette and the eventual release of the movie on both VHS and Laserdisc.

In December 2017, Tamashii Nations reported the release of Techno Police 21C figures. The figures were released in 2018.
