= Macross Ace Frontier =

2008 video game

- Japanese box art of Macross Ace Frontier.
- Developer: Artdink
- Publisher: Bandai Namco
- Series: Macross
- Engine: Gundam Battle engine
- Platform: PlayStation Portable
- Release: JP: October 9, 2008
- Genre: Shooting
- Modes: Single-player; Multiplayer

Macross Ace Frontier (マクロス エース フロンティア, Makurosu Ēsu Furontia) is a shooting game developed by Artdink for the PlayStation Portable. The game is based on Studio Nue's popular Macross series, one of which is known in the West as the first generation of Robotech. It features original elements as well as characters, mechanics, episode plots and BGM borrowed from 1982's The Super Dimension Fortress Macross original TV series, the 1994 Macross Plus OVA series, the 1994 Macross 7 TV series and the 2008 Macross Frontier TV series, as well as incorporating more elements from the 1984 Macross: Do You Remember Love? feature film and the 2002 prequel OVA series Macross Zero.

== Gameplay ==
It is a 3D shooter action game with multiplayer capability (1 - 4 Players) over the PSP ad hoc feature. It features various characters and mecha from the last 25 years of the series, ranging from the VF-1 Valkyrie up to the most recent variable fighter craft in the Macross universe, including the VF-25 Messiah and also featuring the VF-0, the VF-19 Custom Fire Valkyrie as well as various enemy class mecha from Zentradi, Varauta, Anti-UN and Vajra forces. The game was developed using the Gundam Battle engine.

The game allows single player and four-player network modes. Single mode includes Campaign and Freeplay. Network mode can be played ad hoc with up to four players, and it is compatible with adhoc Party for PlayStation Portable beta version for PlayStation Network. Gallery mode gathers unlockable collectible items such as character profiles (with voice preview), mecha profiles (with 3D model preview), pictures and songs.

== Sequels ==
The success of Macross Ace Frontier resulted in a sequel called Macross Ultimate Frontier. The six Macross installments included in Ace Frontier are also supplemented in the sequel by Dynamite 7 and Macross II. The game also features playable mecha from the videogames Macross Digital Mission VF-X2 and Macross M3.

New game elements include additional variable fighters, a "Missile Alert" system, new pilot and operator characters created exclusively for the game by Macross character designer Haruhiko Mikimoto, and special missions as they were played out in their respective series, including those from the antagonists' point of view. The loading screens also feature screenshots from all Macross installments. Ultimate Frontier was released in October 2009 in Japan.

The game is available in standard and limited versions. The latter features a preview of the first Macross Frontier movie (being released in Japan on November 21, 2009), a UMD which features all the opening and end titles from all the Macross titles released so far and an interview with Macross creator Shōji Kawamori.

A sequel called Macross Triangle Frontier was released on February 3, 2011 in Japan for the PSP. It was also developed by Artdink and published by Bandai Namco and used the Gundam Battle engine. There are two modes in the game, "Campaign Mode" and "Academy Mode". Some missions have lower difficulties or changed scenarios.
