= List of Macross Delta characters =

The following is a list of characters from the Macross Delta anime series.

== Characters ==
=== Main characters ===
Hayate Immelmann (ハヤテ・インメルマン, Hayate Inmeruman)
Voiced by: Yuma Uchida
A 17-year-old blunt young human man who possesses an amazing sense of rhythm. He wanders the galaxy aimlessly while wearing a special fold quartz pendant from his father. He is allergic to cats, including seacats (海猫, Umineko), a breed of cat-like sea lions indigenous to the planet Ragna and the cat-like humanoids from planet Voldor. On his last day as a Workroid operator at a shipyard in Shahal City on the planet Al Shahal (惑星アル・シャハル, Wakusei Aru Shaharu), Hayate discovers a stowaway named Freyja Wion. Despite her crime, Hayate helps Freyja evade arrest and the two become friends. During a battle between Delta Flight and the Aerial Knights and a Vár-infected Zentradi platoon, Hayate commandeers a damaged VF-171 Nightmare Plus to fly Freyja to safety before they are shot down by the Aerial Knights and eventually saved by Mirage Farina Jenius. Following the incident, he is recruited into Delta Flight, despite his dislike for the military, out of his desire to fly and to protect those who need. While piloting his Siegfried unit, he develops a maneuver called the "Immelmann Dance" (インメルマン・ダンス, Inmeruman Dansu) by Mikumo. Just like the members of Walküre, Hayate possesses "fold receptors" that not only make him immune to the Vár Syndrome, but also enhance his combat abilities when stimulated, which usually happens when his receptors synchronize with Freyja's when she sings. His Siegfried unit is colored in a white, blue, and gray scheme and his callsign is "Delta 5"; following Messer Ihlefeld's death, he is reassigned as "Delta 4" and later on commandeers Messer's Siegfried unit after his is destroyed during the battle on Ragna. In episode 26, Hayate is issued a new VF-31J with a blue knight marking on its back. He is nicknamed "Haya-Haya" (ハヤハヤ) by Makina.{{ci
Freyja Wion (フレイア・ヴィオン, Fureia Vion)
Voiced by: Minori Suzuki
A 14-year-old (later 15-year-old) Windermerian girl, born on the remote frontier of the galaxy, who ran away from an arranged marriage and yearns to be in the tactical sound unit Walküre. Freyja's species possesses special fold capabilities, distinguished by the special antenna-like tentacle that grow from their heads but having shortened life spans in exchange, as the life expectancy of an average Windermerian is around 30 years. After going through a rigorous audition on Ragna, Freyja becomes an official member of Walküre. A distinguishing trait of Freyja is that her fold abilities usually display levels far below her capacity during rehearsals and regular concerts, only reaching their true potential in dire situations, making her the trump card of the group. When the Windermere Kingdom declares war on the New United Government, Freyja becomes briefly troubled upon suspicion from the media that she could be a Windermerian spy, and accusations of betraying her own people from the Aerial Knights. Another source of concern for her is her growing feelings for Hayate and initial jealousy over his growing closeness to Mirage. Her catchphrase in Walküre is "Music is Energy" (歌は元気, Uta wa Genki). She is nicknamed "Fre-Fre" (フレフレ, Furefure) by Makina.
Mirage Farina Jenius (ミラージュ・ファリーナ・ジーナス, Mirāju Farīna Jīnasu)
Voiced by: Asami Seto
An 18-year-old pilot of mixed human and Zentradi ancestry who is the only woman on Delta Flight. On one hand she takes pride in her duties as a pilot, but on the other she is serious and inflexible. She is a former pilot in the New N.U.N. Spacy before being scouted by Delta's captain, Arad Mölders. Mirage comes from a family with a long history in the Macross universe: she is the daughter of Miranda Jenius, the niece of Mylene Flare Jenius from Macross 7, and granddaughter of Max and Milia Jenius from the first Macross series. Due to her family lineage, she constantly faces the pressure of living up to the reputation of her grandparents. When Hayate is recruited into Delta Flight, Mirage is assigned as his training officer, much to her dismay. They fought for a while due to their opposite personalities and piloting techniques, but then they gradually understand and support each other, notably in the battlefield. She started to develop feelings for Hayate, and got jealous whenever seeing the closeness between Hayate and Freyja. She has a beloved pet named "Q-Lulu". Her Siegfried unit is colored in a white, magenta, and gray scheme, and her callsign is "Delta 4" until she is reassigned to "Delta 2", becoming the new second-in-command of the team following Messer's death. She is nicknamed "Mira-Mira" (ミラミラ) by Makina.

=== Xaos ===
Xaos (ケイオス, Keiosu) is an interplanetary civilian military contractor that operates Walküre and Delta Flight. Its Brísingr Cluster division is headquartered in Barrett City (バレッタシティ, Baretto Shiti), the capital city of the planet Ragna (惑星ラグナ, Wakusei Raguna). Behind Xaos was the mysterious "Lady M" (レディM, Redi Emu), whose identity was never revealed in the TV series. What is known is that she is allegedly connected to the Megaroad-01 ship that disappeared in 2016, and that she had been sponsoring researches on songs and Protoculture since Space War I.

==== Walküre ====
Superdimension Venus Walküre (超時空ヴィーナス ワルキューレ, Chōjikū Vīnasu Warukyūre), also known as Tactical Sound Unit Walküre (戦術音楽ユニット ワルキューレ, Senjutsu Ongaku Yunitto Warukyūre), is an idol group that performs alongside Delta Flight during battle. Their music emits high fold signals that neutralize the effects of Vár Syndrome. Further, each of them possesses fold receptors, immunizing them from Vár Syndrome.

Mikumo Guynemer (美雲・ギンヌメール, Mikumo Ginnumēru)
Voiced by: Ami Koshimizu; JUNNA (singing voice)
The lead vocalist of Walküre. Mikumo had the habit of criticizing Freyja when she made mistakes, but also celebrates her accomplishments. She usually works alone during spying missions. Her catchphrase is "Music is Mystery" (歌は神秘, Uta wa Shinpi). She is nicknamed "Kumo-Kumo" (クモクモ) by Makina.
Kaname Buccaneer (カナメ・バッカニア, Kaname Bakkania)
Voiced by: Kiyono Yasuno
The leader of Walküre. She acts as the big sister of the team and manages of schedules and briefings. Usually seen with Arad Mölders, there is much speculation about the true nature of their relationship. She is originally from the planet Divide, which was ravaged by years of civil war. Kaname had an unsuccessful solo career before being recruited into Xaos and becoming the first member of Walküre. She used to be the ace of the group until Mikumo came along. Kaname often worries about her position as the leader, if she is holding the other members back and burdening them. Her catchphrase is "Music is Life" (歌は命, Uta wa Inochi). She is nicknamed "Kana-Kana" (カナカナ) by Makina.
Makina Nakajima (マキナ・中島, Makina Nakajima)
Voiced by: Nozomi Nishida
A Walküre member who is also a skilled Valkyrie mechanic. She loves different types of mecha, usually calling them cute whenever seeing one. She lives together with Reina. She likes to give nicknames to everyone in Delta Flight. Her catchphrase is "Music is Hope" (歌は希望, Uta wa Kibō). She nicknamed herself "Maki-Maki" (マキマキ).
Reina Prowler (レイナ・プラウラー, Reina Puraurā)
Voiced by: Nao Tōyama
A member who, in contrast to Makina's lively attitude, is very quiet and close-minded. She is a skilled hacker who used to be at odds with Makina, but they grew fond of each other over time to the point of becoming inseparable. Reina was recruited into Walküre after attempting to hack into Xaos's network. Her catchphrase is "Music is Love" (歌は愛, Uta wa Ai). She is nicknamed "Rei-Rei" (レイレイ) by Makina.

==== Delta Flight ====
Delta Flight (Δ小隊, Deruta Shōtai) is an elite Variable Fighter flight unit that battles alongside Walküre.

Arad Mölders (アラド・メルダース, Arado Merudāsu)
Voiced by: Toshiyuki Morikawa
Commander of Delta Flight whose callsign is "Delta 1". Arad appears to have a relationship with Kaname. His Siegfried unit is colored in a white, gray, red, and teal scheme and has a variation of the Skull Leader marking on its back.
Messer Ihlefeld (メッサー・イーレフェルト, Messā Īreferuto)
Voiced by: Koki Uchiyama
A 21-year-old ace pilot who focuses solely on his duty as a member of Delta Flight. As the second-in-command of the team, his callsign is "Delta 2". Because of his serious nature, he has a distrust for Hayate's carefree attitude. Despite their differences, Hayate admires Messer's flying style. Messer was a resident of Marienburg (マリエンブルグ, Marienburugu) on the planet Alfheim (惑星アルブヘイム, Wakusei Arubuheimu) before it was wiped out by the Vár Syndrome. Arad had saved him; however, he had already been infected with the Vár Syndrome, suppressing it with a bracelet that plays the song "AXIA" by Kaname. Due to his illness, he leaves Delta Flight for the Aramis System, but when the Aerial Knights once again attack Al Shahal, he returns to the squad. He is ultimately killed by Keith Aero Windermere during their dogfight. Messer's Siegfried unit is colored in a white, black, and gray scheme and has a Grim Reaper marking on its back and comes to Hayate's possession after his own unit is destroyed during a battle at Ragna. He is nicknamed "Mesa-Mesa" (メサメサ) by Makina.
Chuck Mustang (チャック・マスタング, Chakku Masutangu)
Voiced by: Shinji Kawada
A 24-year-old pilot who runs Ragnyannyan restaurant and takes pride in his jellyfish dishes. He is also a fan of the band Fire Bomber, naming some of his attacks after their songs. Chuck is a native Ragnan; his species has a high affinity for the sea, and have gills on their necks, fins on their elbows, and webbed fingers. His Siegfried unit is colored in a white, orange, and gray scheme and his callsign is "Delta 3".

==== Macross Elysion crew ====
Ernest Johnson (アーネスト・ジョンソン, Ānesuto Jonson)
Voiced by: Unshō Ishizuka
Captain of the Macross Elysion and de facto head of Xaos's Brísingr Cluster operations. Despite being a micronized Zentradi, Ernest stands at a towering height of 227 cm. An underdog by nature, he has been known to lose 100 out of 100 battles.
Beth Muscat (ベス・マスカット, Besu Masukatto)
Voiced by: Miyuu Sawai
A purple-haired bridge operator on Macross Elysion.
Mizuki Yuri (ミズキ・ユーリ, Mizuki Yūri)
Voiced by: Wakana Kingyo
A green-haired bridge operator on Macross Elysion who wears a jellyfish ornament on her head.
Nina O'Brien (ニナ・オブライエン, Nina Oburaien)
Voiced by: Miyū Tsuji
A red-haired bridge operator.
Guy Gilgood (ガイ・ギルグッド, Gai Giruguddo)
Voiced by: Yoshihito Sasaki
A Valkyrie mechanic for Delta Flight.
Harry Takasugi (ハリー・タカスギ, Harī Takasugi)
Voiced by: Ryōhei Kimura
A Valkyrie mechanic for Delta Flight.

=== Ragnyannyan ===
Ragnyannyan (裸喰娘々（らぐにゃんにゃん）, Ragunyannyan) is a fusion Chinese/Ragnan restaurant owned by Chuck Mustang. It is named after Nyan-Nyan, the Chinese restaurant Ranka Lee worked for in Frontier City in Macross Frontier.

Marianne Mustang (マリアンヌ・マスタング, Mariannu Masutangu)
Voiced by:
Chuck's first younger sister. Co-manager of Ragnyannyan who had feelings for Messer, and was distraught upon his death. She disappears upon the detonation of the reactive bomb explosion set off by the N.U.N.S. at the Protoculture ruins, but reunites with her brother after the planet is liberated from the Windermerian occupation.
Zack Mustang (ザック・マスタング, Zakku Masutangu)
Voiced by:
Chuck's first younger brother.
Hack Mustang (ハック・マスタング, Hakku Masutangu)
Voiced by:
Chuck's second younger brother.
Elizabeth Mustang (エリザベス・マスタング, Erizabesu Masutangu)
Voiced by: Wakana Kingyo
Chuck's second younger sister.

=== New U.N. Spacy ===
The New United Nations Spacy is the space service branch of the military of the New United Nations, headquartered on Earth and with garrisons across the galaxy.

Lauri Marin (ラウリ・マラン, Rauri Maran)
Voiced by: Eiji Sekiguchi
A staff member of N.U.N.S. Section Two. Marin is sent to Ragna to inform Xaos that the Protoculture ruins of the planet are to be destroyed to prevent the Windermere Kingdom from using them to amplify the Vár Syndrome. In actuality, he and his colleagues care nothing about innocent lives or the law and desire the power of Protoculture ruins for themselves. When the Windermerians capture Mikumo, Marin leads an N.U.N.S. fleet armed with dimensional weapons to destroy Windermere. However, Mikumo is forced to sing the Song of the Stars, triggering a Vár outbreak that causes the fleet personnel to detonate the weapons on themselves.
Robert Kino (ロバート・キノ, Robāto Kino)
Voiced by: Isshin Chiba
A N.U.N.S. pilot rescued by Hayate after his fleet's failed attempt to battle the Windermerian forces. He is an old acquaintance of Arad and is familiar with Hayate's father Wright.
Alberto Larrazábal (アルベルト・ララサーバル, Aruberuto Rarasābaru)
Voiced by: Kenta Okuma
A N.U.N.S. ace pilot based on the planet Voldor (惑星ヴォルドール, Wakusei Vorudōru) who is infected by the Vár Syndrome. During a battle with Delta Flight, Alberto is cured by Freyja's singing. He later participates on an assault against Windermerian forces on the planet Randall by Xaos and the Voldorian N.U.N.S. division.
Wright Immelmann (ライト・インメルマン, Raito Inmeruman)
Voiced by: Seiro Ogino
Hayate's father, who was a Major in the N.U.N.S. 77th Air Wing. During Windermere's war of independence, Wright dropped a dimensional bomb on the city Carlisle, wiping out the N.U.N.S. forces stationed there along with scores of civilians. He was killed after his VF-22 crashed; his body and the wreckage were recovered by Windermerian forces shortly thereafter. N.U.N.S. had kept the incident a secret for years due to their non-compliance to treaties prohibiting the use and transport of dimensional weapons. It is revealed through the VF-22's flight recorder that Wright was a spy and he had deviated from his mission to drop a dimensional bomb on Windermere's Protoculture Ruins and attempted to drop it where casualties would be kept to a minimum. He had also given a young Freyja an Earth music player prior to his last mission.

=== Windermere Kingdom ===
The Windermere Kingdom (Kingdom of the Wind) (ウィンダミア王国（風の王国）, Windamia Ōkoku (Kaze no Ōkoku)) is a sovereign nation on the planet Windermere IV (惑星ウィンダミアIV, Wakusei Windamia Fō), located 800 light years away from Ragna. The center of the kingdom is the castle Darwent (ダーウェント, Dāuento). Like humankind and the Zentradi, Windermerians are descendants of Protoculture. Compared to other races, Windermerians have a short lifespan, with an average of 30 years. After a costly war of secession against the New United Government seven years before, which ended abruptly with the detonation of a dimensional weapon of mass destruction that took millions of lives, the Kingdom secured its independence and now intends to resume hostilities in order to seize the entire Brísingr Globular Cluster. As part of their plans, Windermere remotely triggers the Vár Syndrome by projecting Heinz's song through a Protoculture shrine neighboring the Windermerian capital. Further, Vár outbreaks are amplified by the Protoculture ruins of the target planet and through consumption of Voldorian spring water combined with Windermerian apples. Due to security concerns and for propaganda purposes, Windermere severely restricts its citizens from interstellar travel.

Heinz Nerich Windermere (Heinz II) (ハインツ・ネーリッヒ・ウィンダミア（ハインツ2世）, Haintsu Nērihhi Windamia (Haintsu Nisei))
Voiced by: Yuka Terasaki; Melody Chubak (singing voice)
Prince of the Windermere Kingdom, he is capable of using his songs to control those infected by the Vár Syndrome, but using his powers in such way is taking a toll on his body, raising concerns regarding his health. Upon Grammier VI's death, Heinz succeeds him as sovereign of the Windermere Kingdom.
Grammier Nerich Windermere (Grammier VI) (グラミア・ネーリッヒ・ウィンダミア（グラミア6世）, Guramia Nērihhi Windamia (Guramia Rokusei))
Voiced by: Masaki Terasoma
The sovereign of the Windermere Kingdom and a former member of the Aerial Knights. Once a student of Ernest Johnson, he was criticized for being too chivalrous. During the battle on Ragna, Grammier is mortally wounded when the Macross Elysion severely damages the Sigur Berrentzs's bridge. Roid then finishes him off in order to manipulate Grammier's supposed last wishes for his people.
Roid Brehm (ロイド・ブレーム, Roido Burēmu)
Voiced by: Kaito Ishikawa
Chancellor of the Windermere Kingdom and a former member of the Aerial Knights. He claims that being the very last of the races descending from the Protoculture civilization, the natives from the Brísingr Globular Cluster are the true heirs of the Protoculture and rightful owners of their legacy. Keith is Roid's childhood friend; they were as close as siblings back then.

==== Aerial Knights ====
The Aerial Knights (空中騎士団, Kūchū Kishidan) are the premier Variable Fighter squadron of the Windermere Kingdom, answering to the royal family. All of them pilot SV-262 Draken III units, colored fully in black during their covert operations against Walküre and the Delta Flight until Chancellor Roid's official declaration of war, when they reveal their default paint scheme, which is usually teal-colored with details in white.

Keith Aero Windermere (キース・エアロ・ウィンダミア, Kīsu Earo Windamia)
Voiced by: Ryōhei Kimura
Leader of the Aerial Knights and member of the royal family, he holds the distinctive title of "White Knight of Derwent" (ダーウェントの白騎士, Dāuento no Shiro Kishi) and views Messer as his rival until he kills him during their dogfight on Al Shahal. He is seriously injured by Hayate during combat on Ragna, losing sight on his right eye. It is revealed in Macross Delta: Kuroki Tsubasa no Shiro Kishi that Keith is Heinz's older brother, Keith's mother being one of Grammier's concubines, but as Keith got older he became distant to Heinz. Keith dies along Roid after stabbing him with his sword, stopping his plan to use Mikumo to subjugate the entire galaxy. His Sv-262 Draken is a custom unit, colored in black with details in gold.
Bogue Con-Vaart (ボーグ・コンファールト, Bōgu Konfāruto)
Voiced by: KENN
An impulsive pilot who hates humans and feels himself humiliated by Hayate since he was outmaneuvered on a battle at planet Voldor and since then vowed to kill him with his own hands. His immense pride and lack of fear in facing down anything will take the Vanguard.
Theo Jussila (テオ・ユッシラ, Teo Yusshira) and Xao Jussila (ザオ・ユッシラ, Zao Yusshira)
Voiced by: Kei Minegishi
Identical twin pilots. Their specialty is combination flight in aerial combat.
Hermann Kroos (ヘルマン・クロース, Heruman Kurōsu)
Voiced by: Daichi Endo
At the age of 33, he is the most senior of the Aerial Knights.
Kassim Eber-hardt (カシム・エーベルハルト, Kashimu Ēberuharuto)
Voiced by: Shinnosuke Ogami
A former Windermerian apple farmer who lost his orchard and family to the previous war with the New United Government. Kassim seems to be the more reasonable and less bloodthirsty of the Aerial Knights. He dies after exhausting his rune during a confrontation with Hayate on Windermere.
Wolf Gura (ヴォルフ・グーラ, Vorufu Gūra)
Voiced by: Takuto Yoshinaga
A rookie pilot that is killed by Hayate during a battle near the planet Ionideth (惑星イオニデス, Wakusei Ionidesu) to save Mirage's life.

==== Other Windermerians ====
Norman Kroos (ノーマン・クロース, Nōman Kurōsu)
Voiced by: Shinnosuke Tachibana
Herman's son.

=== Epsilon Foundation ===
Epsilon Foundation (イプシロン財団, Ipushiron Zaidan) is a private business conglomerate that offers their services to different clients across the galaxy, from medical supplies to military equipment.

Berger Stone (ベルガー・ストーン, Berugā Sutōn)
Voiced by: Keiji Fujiwara
Berger is the head of Epsilon Foundation's Brísingr branch and direct contact with the Windermere Kingdom, usually reporting to Roid the progress on their analysis regarding the relics of the Protoculture. He also does business with Xaos, stating that the Windermere Kingdom is simply one of his clients. Following Xaos's failed assault on Windermere, Berger severs his ties with the Windermerians and shares his knowledge with Xaos, certain that it is more profitable for the Epsilon Foundation if the N.U.N.S. wins the war.

=== Others ===
Lydie Le Gloan (リディ・ル・グローン, Ridi Rugurōn)
Voiced by: Hitomi Kikuchi
A brown-haired native Ragnan candidate who auditioned for Walküre in 2064. She quit during the auditions.
Claire Paddle (クレア・パドル, Kurea Padoru)
Voiced by: Yoko Hikasa
A former member of Walküre, who joined alongside Makina in 2064. She quit due to stress overload and was replaced by Mikumo a year later.

== Mecha and spaceships ==
=== New U.N. ===
==== Xaos ====
VF-31 Siegfried (ジーグフリード, Jīgufurīdo)
Xaos Ragna's principal Variable Fighter, based on the YF-30 Chronos from Macross 30: Voices across the Galaxy. It is named after the lead character of the third arc of Richard Wagner's Der Ring des Nibelungen. Like the Variable Fighters built after the VF-19 Excalibur, the Siegfried is equipped with a pinpoint barrier system that deflects enemy projectiles and can be used to enhance melee attacks. Siegfried units assigned to Delta Flight are also armed with "Cygnus" Multidrones (マルチドローン「シグナス」, Maruchidorōn Shigunasu), boomerang-like drones that assist Walküre on their missions by amplifying their fold transmitters in order to increase the coverage of their effects that nullify the Vár Syndrome.

VF-31A: The standard unit assigned to Alpha, Beta, and Gamma Flight.
VF-31C: Mirage Farina Jenius's custom unit.
VF-31E: Chuck Mustang's custom unit, which features a retractable radome for Vár Syndrome detection.
VF-31F: Messer Ihlefeld's custom unit. Following Messer's death and the destruction of the VF-31J, Hayate takes control of this unit until he receives a new VF-31J.
VF-31J: Hayate Immelmann's custom unit, with the support A.I. disabled and the avionics modified to allow Hayate to fly without a helmet. This unit is destroyed in a reactive bomb explosion on the planet Ragna. In episode 26, Hayate is issued a new unit.
VF-31S: Arad Mölders's custom unit.

VF-1EX
An upgraded version of the VF-1 Valkyrie (バルキリー, Barukirī), the grandfather of all Variable Fighters currently in service. Used primarily as a training unit, the VF-1EX has its avionics updated with an A.I. to safely guide rookie pilots in maneuvers. The A.I can be remotely controlled by another Valkyrie piloted by a senior officer. In addition, the VF-1EX is equipped with an EX-Gear System similar to the one used by the VF-25 Messiah.
SDF/C-108 Macross Elysion (マクロス・エリシオン, Makurosu Erishion)
A Macross-class battle fortress stationed on Ragna which serves as the headquarters of Delta Flight and Walküre whose arms can detach and be used as separate spaceships. Its name is derived from Elysium.

Aether (アイテール, Aitēru)
The Macross Elysion's left arm that detaches into an aircraft carrier transporting the Delta Flight's Valkyries among other equipment for external missions. It is named after the Greek god of the upper air. It can also be used for the "Aether Attack", the Macross Elysion's own version of the SDF-1's Daedalus Attack and the Macross Quarter's Macross Attack.
Hemera (ヘーメラー, Hēmerā)
The Macross Elysion's right arm that can be used as a cannon. It is named after the Greek goddess of the daytime.

Island Jackpot (アイランド・ジャックポット, Airando Jakkupotto)
An island colony that landed on planet Ragna 30 years before the start of the series. During the Kingdom of Windermere's invasion of the planet, the surviving citizens of Barrett City evacuate into the Island before it and the Macross Elysion leave Ragna.

==== New U.N. Spacy ====
VF-171 Nightmare Plus (ナイトメアプラス, Naitomea Purasu)
The New U.N. Spacy's workhorse Variable Fighter, which is an upgrade of the original VF-17 Nightmare from Macross 7. It has been in service since the Vajra War of Macross Frontier.
VB-6 König Monster (ケーニッヒモンスター, Kēniggu Monsutā)
A Variable Destroid that transforms into a bomber, originally introduced in Macross VF-X2 and also seen in Macross Frontier.
VF-22 Sturmvogel II (シュトゥルムフォーゲルII, Shuturumufōguru Tsū)
A limited production Variable Fighter first seen in Macross 7, based on the YF-21 from Macross Plus. One VF-22 was piloted by Wright Immelmann, who dropped a dimensional bomb on the Windermerian city Carlisle in 2060, claiming millions of lives. The plane and Wright's body were recovered by Windermerian forces and under King Grammier VI's orders, it was restored and put on display in Darwent as a reminder of the incident. Berger Stone secretly tunes the Sturmvogel II and removes the leg parts, allowing Arad, Kaname, Makina, and Reina to fly it to escape Darwent.
Destroid Cheyenne II (デストロイド・シャイアンII, Desutoroido Shaian Tsū)
The New U.N. Spacy's anti-aircraft Destroid, first seen in Macross Frontier; it is an updated version of the ADR-03-Mk III Destroid Cheyenne from the first U.N. War in 2008, as seen in Macross Zero.

==== Zentradi ====
Type 104 Regult (104式リガード, Hyakuyon-shiki Rigāto)
The standard Zentradi officer's battle pod.
Glaug (グラージ, Gurāji)
A Zentradi battle pod reserved for squadron leaders.
Queadluun Rhea (クァドラン・レア, Kuadoran Rea)
A high performance Zentradi power suit manufactured by General Galaxy, first seen in Macross Frontier, based on the original Queadluun Rau.

==== Others ====
Workroid (ワークロイド, Wākuroido)
A civilian Destroid used for construction and as a forklift in shipyards across the galaxy.

=== Windermere ===
Sigur Berrentzs (シグル = バレンス, Shiguru Barensu)
A relic from the Protoculture civilization, it is a massive spaceship that the Windermerians managed to salvage and restore, adding it to their war effort.

==== Aerial Knights ====
Sv-262 Draken III (ドラケンIII, Doraken Surī)
The Aerial Knights' main Variable Fighter. Its design is inspired by the Saab 35 Draken.

Sv-262Ba: The default variation used by the Aerial Knights.
Sv-262Hs: Keith Aero Windermere's custom unit.
Lil Draken (リル・ドラケン, Riru Doraken)
The Draken III's drone units that operate similarly to the New U.N. Spacy's Ghost units.

SV-154 Svärd (スヴァード, Suvādo)
An earlier Variable Fighter of the Kingdom of the Wind. Its design is inspired by the real-life Lockheed F-104 Starfighter.
