= The Super Dimension Fortress Macross (2003 video game) =

2003 video game

- Developer: Sega AM2
- Publisher: Bandai
- Series: Macross
- Platform: PlayStation 2
- Release: PS2: JP: October 23, 2003
- Genres: Action, flight simulator, shooter
- Mode: Single-player

The Super Dimension Fortress Macross (超時空要塞マクロス, Chō Jikū Yōsai Makurosu) is a 3D shooting game based on the animated science fiction series of the same name and released in October 2003 in Japan for the PlayStation 2 console.

== Production ==
The game was produced by Bandai and created by the Sega AM2 team that programmed Aero Dancing. The game features a blend of arcade shooting and aerial combat similar to the Ace Combat series.

== Gameplay ==
In the game players play through the events of either the television animated series or the movie. In the longer yet less difficult TV series version of events, players take the pilot role of Skull Seven (スカル7番機 Sukaru Nanabanki) who is then promoted to command of the Purple Team as Purple Leader. In the shorter yet more difficult movie route, the character is referred to as Skull Seven (スカル・セブン Sukaru Sebun) and later on as Apollo Leader.

In both versions, the player's wingmen are two original characters named Eddie Juutilainen and Bruce Rudel. In addition, another original character called Emma Granger acts as the team's tactical officer from aboard the bridge of the SDF-1 Macross.

The player's character in the game is unnamed. This character never utters a word and his face is never seen during any of both the TV and movie paths of the entire game.

Other differences between routes include the armament of the VF-1 Valkyrie variable fighters (the later upgrades used in the movie route are more well equipped), boss fights (the only constant is a duel with Milia, a Zentradi/Meltrandi ace pilot), and the song that pop idol Lynn Minmay sings during the final battle.

In the course of the game, players will occasionally encounter characters from the series, such as receiving briefings from Roy Focker or duelling with Quamzin Kravshera.
