= List of Macross characters =

The following is a list of all the fictional characters within the Macross anime franchise.

== The Super Dimension Fortress Macross ==
=== Humans ===
- Hikaru Ichijyo (Arihiro Hase and Kenji Nojima/Vic Mignogna)
- Lynn Minmay (Mari Iijima in both Japanese and English versions)
- Misa Hayase (Mika Doi/Monica Rial)

==== Roy Focker ====
Roy Focker
- Macross character
- First appearance: SDF Macross Episode 1 Macross Zero Episode 1
- Voiced by: Akira Kamiya (Japanese); Brett Weaver (English)

Roy Focker (ロイ・フォッカー, Roi Fokkā) is a fictional character from the Japanese anime science fiction series Macross (which was loosely adapted as the first story arc of Robotech) and the prequel OVA Macross Zero. He is voiced by Akira Kamiya in the original Japanese anime television series and by Brett Weaver in the 2006 ADV Films English dub.

===== Fictional character biography =====
Roy Focker is American. During his college days he had interest in prehistoric civilizations and archeology studies, and was in a relationship with his senior Aries Turner. However, after being left by her, Roy dropped his studies and became a stunt pilot in the air circus led by Hikaru Ichijyo's father. Some time later he decided to join the U.N. Spacy after most of his friends died in the U.N. Wars. His flight instructor during this time was D.D. Ivanov.

During the war Roy became a talented and strong-willed fighter pilot, known for his love of women and alcohol. During the war he shot down 180 enemy fighters. Focker was selected later as one of the first test pilots for the development of the variable fighters by the U.N. Forces. In 2008 he is deployed as a squadron commander with the Skull Team aboard the stealth carrier CVN-99 Asuka II on a secret mission in the South Pacific and flies the VF-0 Phoenix in battle against the SV-51s of the Anti-U.N. Forces. The work done on the VF-0 helps the coinciding development of the VF-1 Valkyrie.

Despite his long absence during the U.N. Wars and the death of Hikaru's father, Hikaru still remained a close friend to Roy and considered him his senpai. After the end of the U.N. Wars, Focker involved himself in the VF-X development project flying both the VF-X and the VF-X-1 (non-transformable and transformable flight test prototypes of the VF-1 Valkyrie), and his flight experience earned him the command of the VF-1 Skull Squadron aboard the super-large-scale semi-submersible attack aircraft carrier CVS-101 Prometheus.

During Space War I Roy Focker is still a smoking, drinking womanizer who constantly defies death and, when not on another desperate mission, enjoys life and its pleasures to the fullest. He has a relationship with Claudia LaSalle, an officer stationed on the SDF-1 Macross bridge.

Roy dies in episode 18 ("Pineapple Salad"), from wounds sustained while defending Macross from Milia Fallyna's force of Queadluun-Rau battle suits. Instead of going to the hospital to treat his wounds, he chooses to play the guitar while waiting for Claudia LaSalle to finish her pineapple salad; while she's cooking for him, he collapses from a sudden internal bleeding and passes away few minutes later. To Hikaru's chagrin given his then shaken self-confidence in his flying skill in war, he is promoted as the new leader of Roy's squadron, using his mecha as well.

In the 1984 The Super Dimension Fortress Macross: Do You Remember Love? film adaptation of the original TV series, Roy Focker dies aboard an alien Zentradi ship while fighting Quamzin Kravshera. In the movie Roy sacrifices himself to let both Hikaru Ichijyo and Misa Hayase escape.

===== Character creation =====
Roy Focker was named in honor of the Fokker aircraft company, and its founder Anthony Fokker who built the Fokker E.I, the Fokker Dr.I and Fokker D.VII fighter aircraft during World War I. In flashback sequences, Roy flies a reproduction Fokker D.VII, and gives Hikaru a model of one as a "get well" gift. Furthermore, although several possible scenarios regarding his death abound, the Red Baron (for which the Fokker Dr.I was most famous) was possibly shot down in combat by a Canadian pilot called Roy Brown, the origin of Roy Focker's first name.

The colors on Roy's VF-1S Valkyrie are similar to those of the VF-84 Jolly Rogers unit that flew the F-14 Tomcat, a plane that inspired the basic design of the VF-1 Valkyrie.

===== In other media =====
In any rendition of the famous RPG crossover of Super Robot Wars involving Macross, Roy Focker constituted a major character in the overall story, and did not die as per the scenario of Macross. In these games, Focker was fighting alongside many other robot anime icons, especially those voiced by his voice actor Akira Kamiya (e.g. Ryoma Nagare of Getter Robo, Akira Hibiki of Reideen, Kazuya Ryuzaki of Daimos, and Sanshiro Tsuwabuki of Gaiking).

In the sequel series Macross Frontier, the leader of the Frontier fleet's S.M.S. Skull Platoon is Ozma Lee. Like Roy, he shows elements of the same personality and becomes a mentor figure to series protagonist, Alto. In addition, food involving pineapples (in this case, pineapple cake) appears to have nearly lethal effects – Ozma is badly wounded on the day he promised to prepare pineapple cake for Ranka with Cathy's recipe, and the evidence of his injury produces a similar shock with SMS groundcrew as that produced after Roy Focker's final flight. Breaking the fourth wall, Michel notes that if Ozma had died, it would have been "The most moving scene ever!".

==== Bruno J. Global ====
Bruno J. Global
- Macross character
- First appearance: Episode 1 – "Boobytrap"
- Voiced by: Michio Hazama / John Swasey

In-universe information
- Relatives: Miho Global (wife)

Bruno J. Global (ブルーノ・J・グローバル, Burūno Jei Gurōbaru) is the fictional captain of the SDF-1 Macross in the anime series The Super Dimension Fortress Macross. In the Macross TV Japanese series Captain Global is an Italian submarine skipper and UN Spacy officer who was involved in the refit of the crashed Alien Star Ship 1 (ASS-1) into the SDF-1 Macross during the U.N. Wars. He is the SDF-1 ship's plankowner and sees her through many adventures and hardships battling the Zentradi aliens during the original series. He regularly pulls out and lights up his smoking pipe when he feels nervous.

===== Macross =====
According to the fictional continuity of the Macross series, Bruno Global is of Italian ethnicity. Before commanding the Macross, Global's commanding officer during the U.N. Wars was Misa Hayase's father Takashi. He was the captain of the U.N. Navy submarine Marco Polo and the UN Spacy Oberth class space destroyer Goddard, which engaged and destroyed her hijacked sister ship Tsiolkovsky in the first ever use of reaction weaponry in real ship-vs-ship space combat during the U.N. Wars. Bruno J. Global rose through the ranks of the United Nations Forces thanks to his exploits during the Unification Wars until he was assigned as Captain of the flagship of the infant Spacy, the SDF-1 Macross fortress.

During the skirmishes of Space War I, Global came up with various strategies (with a little help from First Lieutenant Misa Hayase) to evade the Zentradi, rather than attacking them head-on. The most tragic event under his command came with the collapse of the Macross ill-fated omnidirectional barrier, wiping out a large city in the Ontario region. The event caused a wider rift between him and the U.N., leading to the temporary exile of the Macross from Earth. Eventually, when Milia Fallyna of the Lap Lamiz fleet defected to the Macross and wished to marry Maximilian Jenius, Global gave them permission, and by doing so made the first true step toward peace with the Zentradi.

After Space War I, he took an administrative position in the U.N. Government and designed the Human Emigration Project, a space colonization scheme followed by the U.N. for the following years to ensure the survival of mankind and its culture in case of further appearances of Zentradi and Supervision Army fleets. In the Macross continuity he became an admiral as well as commander of the U.N. Spacy after the battle against Boddole Zer. He survives the Macross series to become U.N. Representative in 2014, and retires from the Spacy as a full Admiral.

In Macross, he married Miho Global in March 2003. It's unknown if they had any children, or if they survived the Battle with the Boddole Zer Main Fleet.

The voice of Captain Bruno J. Global was provided by Michio Hazama in the original Japanese version and John Swasey in the English dub by ADV Films released in January 2006.

===== Legacy =====
- As a tribute to the series, the character design for Nemo in Nadia: The Secret of Blue Water, looks almost exactly like Global. In the AD Vision English dub of the series, it is taken a step further as the voice of Nemo (supplied by Ev Lunning Jr.) resembles Gloval from Robotech.
- The Battlecruiser Captain of StarCraft and StarCraft: Brood War bears some minor resemblance to Global, and speaks in a manner and tone similar to his Robotech counterpart.
- In episode 13 of the Macross Frontier animated TV series the ruins of what appears to be a production version of the SDF-1 Macross are found. This new ship is named the Global. Also, the Captain of S.M.S Macross Quarter, Jeffrey Wilder, physically resembles Bruno J. Global.
- The Captain of the Alliance submarine Pincer X2 located in Vash'jir in the game World of Warcraft is named Captain Glovaal and speaks in a manner and tone similar to his Robotech counterpart.

==== Hayao Kakizaki ====
Hayao Kakizaki
- Macross character
- First appearance: Episode 8 – Longest Birthday
- Voiced by: Katsumi Suzuki / Jason Douglas

Hayao Kakizaki (柿崎速雄, Kakizaki Hayao) is a fictional character in the science fiction television series The Super Dimension Fortress Macross, voiced by Katsumi Suzuki. In the ADV Films dub of Macross, he is voiced by Jason Douglas.

In the fictional world of Macross Hayao Kakizaki is a tall and strong, but not very smart, U.N. Spacy japanese variable fighter pilot who was assigned to the Vermilion Squadron, along with Maximilian Jenius, to be under the command of Hikaru Ichijyo. He pilots a brown-white VF-1A Valkyrie in the television series and in The Super Dimension Fortress Macross: Do You Remember Love? movie he pilots a green-striped VF-1A Valkyrie. Among the pilots of the Vermillion Squadron, Kakizaki is the least serious and skilled. His characterization adds to an already heavy laden humorous anime even more comic relief. He is portrayed also as being a laid back character, which often at times would endanger him while out battling the Zentradi. Compared to his teammates, Kakizaki is also the least experienced pilot, and from time-to-time, Hikaru and Max had to save him from being killed.

In November 2009, when Gunsight One's radar system was damaged, Kakizaki, along with Max and his superior, Hikaru Ichijyo accompanied Misa Hayase to scout the surrounding of the SDF-1 Macross. During this mission, he and the others were captured by the Zentradi. This marks the first contact between the races.

In episode 19: Burst Point, Kakizaki was killed in action when the Macross's barrier system overloads and Kakizaki's Valkyrie was caught in the blast field. In the Macross chronology, he was KIA just after the episode of Roy Focker's death. However, in The Super Dimension Fortress Macross: Do You Remember Love? movie, he was killed in battle by missiles fired by a group of Queadluun-Raus led by Milia Fallyna while joking with Max and Hikaru (Ironically underestimating their enemy's strength due to them being female).

In the Robotech western adaptation his ethnicity was changed to American and his name became Ben Dixon.

Hayao Kakizaki also appears in videogames such as The Super Dimension Fortress Macross for the PlayStation 2 and Macross Ace Frontier for the PlayStation Portable.

In the sequel series Macross Frontier, an in-direct reference is made to Kakizaki by Alto Saotome, who mentions the "Valkyrie's Curse", as he says "It's bad luck to talk about women when in combat...If you do, then you might get shot down".

==== Claudia LaSalle ====
Claudia LaSalle
- Macross character
- First appearance: Episode 1 – "Boobytrap"
- Voiced by: Noriko Ohara / Christine Auten

In-universe information
- Alias: Claudia Grant (Robotech)

Claudia LaSalle (クローディア・ラサール, Kurōdia Rasāru) is a fictional character in the Macross animated science fiction universe. She debuts in the first episode of the first series, The Super Dimension Fortress Macross. She also appears in The Super Dimension Fortress Macross: Do You Remember Love? movie and in archival footage and flashbacks in The Super Dimension Fortress Macross: Flash Back 2012 music video collection.

Her voice actress was Noriko Ohara in the original Japanese TV version, in The Super Dimension Fortress Macross: Do You Remember Love? movie adaptation, and in The Super Dimension Fortress Macross: Flash Back 2012 OVA.

In the English dub of the original Japanese series that was released by ADV Films in January 2006 the character was voiced by Christine Auten.

In the fictional continuity of Macross Claudia LaSalle is an American U.N. Spacy bridge officer in charge of weaponry and navigation of the SDF-1 Macross space fortress. She and fellow bridge officer Misa Hayase are close friends, and she is often there to give her friend advice on matters of the heart (especially when it comes to Misa's confused feelings for Hikaru Ichijyo), something Hayase is awkward in. She used to be in a close relationship with Roy Focker until his death.

She is known as Claudia Grant in Robotech. Claudia LaSalle does not die at the end of Macross, although her Robotech counterpart does die.

It is possible Claudia is a relative of Edgar LaSalle from Macross Zero, who was Shin Kudo's RIO.

==== Max Jenius ====
Maximilian Jenius
- Macross, Macross 7 character
- First appearance: Macross Episode 8 – Longest Birthday
- Voiced by: Sho Hayami / Chris Patton

In-universe information
- Relatives: Milia Fallyna Jenius (wife); Komilia Maria Fallyna Jenius (daughter); Miracle Jenius (daughter); Muse Jenius (daughter); Therese Jenius (daughter); Emilia Jenius (daughter); Miranda Jenius (daughter); Mylene Flare Jenius (daughter); Moaramia Fallyna Jenius (adopted daughter); Mirage Fallyna Jenius (granddaughter)

Maximilian Jenius (マクシミリアン・ジーナス, Makushimirian Jīnasu) is a fictional character in the science fiction television series Macross, voiced by Shō Hayami. In the new English adaptation by ADV Films, he is voiced by Chris Patton.

===== Role in Macross =====
He is a young fighter pilot, having joined Hikaru Ichijyo's Vermillion Team, along with Hayao Kakizaki, at the age of only 16. Jenius shows in his first sortie that he is a preternaturally talented ace pilot who is nearly invincible in combat, despite his need to wear corrective lenses on duty. Max is quickly recognized as the top pilot of the force, as marked by being granted to distinctively repaint his mecha into his preferred blue color.

Jenius' skill at piloting mecha becomes even more celebrated with feats that no other pilot would have thought of, much less achieved. One outstanding incident involves his infiltrating a Zentradi battleship in his valkyrie and disguising it with a Zentradi uniform, allowing him to escape detection.

Although Jenius is not above an occasional egotistical musing when he is off duty, he is also well known for his affable and courteous personality and his comrades hold him in high favor on top of his impressive skill. He is also an incurable romantic in his youth which shows when he meets his future wife. That occurred when the top Zentradi ace pilot, Milia Fallyna, hears about a formidable pilot aboard the humans' SDF-1 Macross space fortress and seeks to challenge him personally in battle. Max manages to defeat Milia not once, but thrice. The first in their respective mechas, the second in simulated combat (a video game) and finally in a knife fight to the death. It is this final fight where the two rivals fall in love. Immediately after the knife-fight in the park Max proposes to Milia who accepts. Afterward, Milia is allowed to join the mainline fighting forces of the SDF-1 Macross and becomes Max's wingmate on duty, piloting a distinctive red Valkyrie alongside Max's blue one.

After the Zentradi Fleet that nearly destroys the Earth is vanquished, Max and Milia settle down in the new city built around the SDF-1 Macross and begin a new life together. In March 2011, they give birth to a daughter (the first of seven) named Komilia Maria Fallyna Jenius. The name Komilia (which means "Little Milia") is chosen because with her green hair and green eyes, she looks so much like her mother (although it has also been suggested that the "ko" simply refers to the Japanese kanji character "child" that is often used on the end of Japanese female personal names – a suggestion which is supported by the title of episode 30: Viva Maria, as opposed to Viva Komilia). Komilia proves how related the Humans and Zentradi are. The "first stellar interracial child" is very unabashed baby, and proves resilient to Milia's sometimes rough and inexperienced handling. Max, despite his relatively young age, proves to be a happy and successful father, although he clearly has a strong dislike of Komilia's playfulness with his hair. Misa Hayase and Claudia LaSalle find Komilia adorable and are amazed that she isn't shy at all, and envy Max and Milia for having such a beautiful child.

Max and his family play a crucial role in the U.N.' capture of a factory satellite in November 2011. After blasting their way into the enemy command ship, Max and Milia proudly display their child, cradled in Milia's arms and wearing a tiny pink and white spacesuit, to the hostile Zentradi. Max smiles as Milia explains that Komilia "was created by the two of us...". The hostile Zentradi, who have had no exposure to human culture and have never seen a baby before, become terrified of Komilia and flee in fear, causing chaos aboard the command ship and disorder throughout the enemy fleet. This allows the Earth forces and the allied Zentradi to seize the factory.

In the original Macross series, Max and Milia have seven natural daughters and adopt a Zentradi girl over a period of twenty years from 2011 to 2031. The oldest is Komilia Maria Fallyna Jenius, who is the only one seen in the original series. The youngest is Mylene Flare Jenius, who becomes a major character in Macross 7. Emilia Jenius is seen briefly in Macross 7 the Movie: The Galaxy's Calling Me!. His granddaughter Mirage Fallyna Jenius is a major character in Macross Delta.

===== Role in Macross 7 =====
Prior to the events of Macross 7, Max is appointed commander of the 7th Macross Fleet and captain of the flagship Battle 7, with a de-micronized Exsedol Folmo as his advisor. Although separated from Milia, he is in almost-daily contact with her, due to her position as mayor of the civilian ship City 7, and possibly continues to harbor feelings for her. Despite being in his fifties, Max appears to have aged very little from his original appearance. Character designer Haruhiko Mikimoto half-jokingly said that is the case "Because he's a genius. Growing old is a state of mind for average men...".

Max and Milia, in addition to being legally separated from each other, are also separated from most of their children – all but their youngest daughter, Mylene Flare Jenius, have moved away from the Macross 7 fleet. Max often checks up on Mylene, whom he feels very protective of. As the series progresses, Max becomes responsible for the establishment of "Sound Force", a trio of Valkyries piloted by the members of Fire Bomber which includes Mylene. Initially, he forbids Mylene from joining Sound Force, for fear of putting her life in danger, but is persuaded to allow her to join after witnessing her skill as a pilot and musician. Max often clashes with Milia about Mylene, but the two are able to remain civil (usually) around each other for the sake of their daughter, who unsuccessfully tries to bring them together again.

Late in the series, Max and Milia are able to overcome their troubled past and resume flying together in their distinctive blue and red VF-22 Sturmvogels in order to save the fleet from threat posed by the Protodeviln. In the final battle, Max, Milia and Mylene fight side-by-side against Lord Geperunitch.

===== Role in Macross: Do You Remember Love film =====
In The Super Dimension Fortress Macross: Do You Remember Love?, an animated film adaptation of the original series, Max and Milia met in a completely different way. After the Macross returns to Earth, the Meltrandi, under the command of Lap Lamiz, launched their own campaign against the Macross. The Meltrandi fleet sends in their highly trained Queadluun-Rau power armor fighters, led by their ace pilot, Milia Fallyna, to retrieve a Protoculture tablet containing an ancient song they believed could help them defeat their Zentradi enemies. In the ensuing battle with the Macross and subsequent death of Hayao Kakizaki, Max and Milia fight against each other. In the last phase of the battle, Max and Milia enter the Lap Lamiz's ship and there, Max manages to down his opponent. Upon breaching the armor, Max is enamored by Milia as she is with him, and expresses his awe at the Meltran pilot.

In the final battle between Boddole Zer and the Macross fleet, a macronized Max is seen with Milia battling together in their respective specialized blue and red Queadluun-Raus. This scene is one of the few scenes showing Max without his glasses.

Another difference in the movie is that after Roy Focker's death, Max is promoted to leader of the Skull Squadron, thus having Hikaru Ichijyo and Hayao Kakizaki briefly as his subordinates.

===== References in other media =====
In Macross Frontier, the character Michael Blanc resembles Max in being a star pilot that wears glasses. He has a romantic interest in Klan Klang of the Meltrandi, who resembles Milia.

==== Other characters ====
- Hayao Kakizaki (Katsumi Suzuki/Jason Douglas)
- Vanessa Laird (Run Sasaki/Nancy Novotny)
- Kim Kabirov (Hiromi Tsuru/Kira Vincent Davis)
- Shammy Milliome (Sanae Miyuki/Hilary Haag)
- Komilia Maria Fallyna Jenius
- Lynn Kaifun (Hirotaka Suzuoki/Christopher Ayres)
- Lynn Shao-Chin (Minoru Inaba/George Manley)
- Lynn Fei-Chun (Yoshino Ōtori/Kelly Manison)
- Yoshio (Yoko Ogai/Tiffany Grant)
- Panapp (Hiromi Tsuru/Emily Carter-Essex)
- Pocky (Run Sasaki/Mariela Ortiz)
- May (Atsuko Yoneyama/Sasha Paysinger)
- Jamis Merin (Atsuko Yoneyama/Emily Carter-Essex)
- Maistrov (Minoru Inaba/Marty Fleck)
- Admiral Takashi Hayase (Osamu Saka)
- Kenichi Machizaki (Shigeru Nakahara/Leraldo Anzaldua)
- Riber Fruhling (Hirotaka Suzuoki/Leraldo Anzaldua)

=== Zentradi ===
- Britai Kridanik (Eiji Kanie/John Gremillion)
- Exsedol Folmo (Ryūsuke Ōbayashi/Andy McAvin)
- Moruk Lap Lamiz (Yoshino Ōtori/Tiffany Grant)
- Milia Fallyna (Eri Takeda/Luci Christian)
- Warera Nantes (Katsumi Suzuki/Mark X. Laskowski)
- Loli Dosel (Tsutomu Fujii/Greg Ayres)
- Conda Bromco (Kōsuke Meguro/Xero Reynolds)
- Zeril (Kōsuke Meguro)
- Oigul (Minoru Inaba/Mike Vance)
- Karita Trakajiide (Shigeru Nakahara)
- Dagao (Ryuji Nakagi/Brett Weaver)

==== Boddole Zer ====
In the fictional Macross universe, Boddole Zer (ボドル・ザー, Bodoru Zā) is the supreme commander of the 4,795,122-ship Boddole Zer Main Fleet belonging to the main antagonists, the Zentradi. He is also known as Bodolzaa in AnimEigo's English subtitled Macross release. Boddole Zer was voiced by Osamu Ichikawa in the original Macross TV series. The character was also voiced by Mike Kleinhenz in the English dub by ADV Films released during January 2006.

Golg Boddole Zer ordered his subordinate Britai Kridanik to track down and recover the Supervision Army spaceship which had crashlanded on Earth, thus starting Space War I. After the failures of Britai and his other subordinate Moruk Lap Lamiz to capture the SDF-1 Macross and their subsequent "cultural contamination" by the miclones (humans), Boddole Zer ordered all 4,795,122 ships in the Boddole Zer Main Fleet to fold to Earth and destroy the SDF-1 Macross, the defecting Zentradi forces, and the Earth itself in 2010. Boddole Zer was killed when an unorthodox tactic by the SDF-1 Macross destroyed his massive flagship, but not before he ordered the obliteration of the Earth's surface with less than one million human survivors in the Battle with the Boddole Zer Main Fleet.

Boddole Zer also appeared in the movie The Super Dimension Fortress Macross: Do You Remember Love? as a cyborg Zentradi leader who was fused with a massive combat mobile fortress that had a 120,000 cycle history of space battles. In the movie, Boddole Zer was also in command of a male Zentradi fleet which had been at war with the female Meltlandi for hundreds of thousands of years. He orders the destruction of Earth after his fleet discovers a rebuilt Meltlandi ship on the planet before the beginning of the film. After both the Zentradi and the Meltlandi become "cultured" by an ancient Protoculture song and join the surviving humans, Boddole Zer and his fortress are attacked by the combined forces of both fleets and the SDF-1 Macross. Boddole Zer himself is destroyed by Hikaru Ichijyo flying a VF-1 Valkyrie variable fighter at the end of the film.

==== Exsedol Folmo ====
Exsedol Folmo
- Macross character
- First appearance: The Super Dimension Fortress Macross Episode 1 – "Booby Trap"
- Voiced by: Ryūsuke Ōbayashi / Andy McAvin

In-universe information
- Species: Zentradi

Exsedol Folmo (エキセドル・フォルモ, Ekisedoru Forumo) is a fictional character in the Macross universe. He first appeared in the original Macross and then in Macross: Do You Remember Love?, Macross: Flash Back 2012, Macross 7, the movie Macross 7: The Galaxy Is Calling Me! and the OVA Macross 7 Encore.

The character was voiced by Ryūsuke Ōbayashi in the original 1982 Japanese animated TV series. In the 2006 ADV Films Dub he was voiced by Andy McAvin.

According to the fictional continuity of Macross, Exsedol is an alien Zentradi records keeping officer (a walking living encyclopedia) attached to fleet commander Britai Kridanik, and would always be seen at the side of his superior during Space War I giving advice. He is a Zem First Class "Archivist" Official in the Britai Fleet and his memory capacity is said to surpass any electronic device that ever existed, as he keeps details of every combat in the entire 500,000-year-old Zentradi history for instant recall. During their first contact with the humans and upon their discovery that they were miclones, Exsedol advised that they should be left alone, quoting an ancient Zentradi battle directive. However, this particular piece of advice was ignored by his superiors.

Much later, when the Britai fleet had decided to defect to the humans side, he was micloned and sent to the Macross as a peace envoy. When the war ended and UN Spacy was re-established he joined up as an advisor. Some time later, he reverted to his larger size and his body went through major alterations as a precaution against him losing the trove of information lying in his mind, which explains his altered appearance in the later Macross productions.

===== Other appearances =====
Exsedol appeared in the movie The Super Dimension Fortress Macross: Do You Remember Love?, also as a Zentradi advisor who becomes a defector to the human side. However, his appearance was radically redesigned, with a bald, swollen head, green skin, a cloak covering his body, and retractable tendrils for arms.

This design was carried over to his subsequent appearance in the TV series Macross 7, with some slight differences, namely that he has a blue collar, green tendrils, and a slightly darker skin tone. Exsedol in Macross 7 is also rarely seen without a hemispherical cap on his cranium, usually connected to the ceiling.

When the Macross 7 launched, Exsedol joined Cpt. Maximilian Jenius as an advisor aboard the Battle 7, and was a great source of information on the new and unknown (to the humans) enemy, the Protodeviln, though in earlier episodes Exsedol's instinctive terror of the Protodevlin gets the better of him, and he prefers to hide away from the new enemy.

For the entire series, Exsedol is depicted as being at full Zentradi size, initially with his head sticking up through an opening in the bridge floor, close to where Cpt. Jenius sits; several other such openings are seen to exist in the ship, so that Exsedol can participate in military conferences. Sometimes the animation depicts Exsedol as much larger than his original Zentradi form, but that could be attributed to variance in the artwork.

Episode 37 of Macross 7, The Mystery of the Ruins? also depicts Exsedol walking outside for the first time since the colony fleet launched, in order to investigate ancient Protoculture ruins. Later episodes have him leaving the Battle 7 for the science ship Einstein, where he sits among the crew instead of underneath the floor.

An unnamed Zentradi advisor who greatly resembled the Macross 7 Exsedol also appeared in episodes 12 and 13 of the Macross Frontier TV series. A human and Zentradi mall seen in episode 5 of Macross Frontier was also dubbed Folmo.

===== Character notes =====
The original in-story explanation for the character's new appearance was that Exsedol had been physically modified between series, presumably from his original design. This was found in the liner notes for the Macross 7 DVDs: “Although he was Micloned at one time, he purportedly returned to his former Zentradi size and realtered his body makeup for fear of losing his cerebral capacity and memories”. Many flashbacks to the original series in later Macross productions featured the new design for Exsedol.

Kawamori described the relation between the different depictions of Space War I: "The real Macross is out there, somewhere. If I tell the story in the length of a TV series, it looks one way, and if I tell it as a movie-length story, it's organized another way." According to him, the changes in the appearance of Exsedol Folmo in the different Macross series is due to them being all equally fictional and open to changes in the style and design of their plot and characters.

==== Milia Fallyna Jenius ====
Milia Fallyna Jenius
- Macross, Macross 7 character
- First appearance: Macross Episode 12 "Big Escape"
- Voiced by: Eri Takeda / Luci Christian

In-universe information
- Species: Zentradi (Meltlandi)
- Relatives: Maximilian Jenius (husband); Komilia Maria Fallyna Jenius (daughter); Miracle Jenius (daughter); Muse Jenius (daughter); Therese Jenius (daughter); Emilia Jenius (daughter); Miranda Jenius (daughter); Mylene Flare Jenius (daughter); Moaramia Fallyna Jenius (adopted daughter); Mirage Fallyna Jenius (granddaughter)

Milia Fallyna Jenius (ミリア・ファリーナ・ジーナス, Miria Farīna Jīnasu) is a fictional character in the Macross Japanese animated science fiction series, voiced by Eri Takeda. In the 2006 English adaptation by ADV Films she is voiced by Luci Christian.

===== Role in Macross =====
Milia is an ace Quimeliquola Queadluun-Rau power armor pilot, a Meltlandi, or female Zentradi, a giant race of warriors in Macross: Do You Remember Love?. Serving on board a Meltlandi ship in the Lap Lamiz fleet, she joined Commander Britai Kridanik's investigation of the "miclones" of Earth, and their spacecraft, the SDF-1 Macross. After being beaten in a pitched battle against the human pilot Maximilian Jenius, she volunteered for micloning and, reduced to human size, infiltrated the Macross. Rather than espionage, her real aim was to find and kill the man who had humiliated her. At a video game arcade, she again finds herself unbeatable until she is challenged to a duel by Max, an incredibly skilled pilot and the pilot whom Milia had dueled against in real combat. Milia concludes (correctly) that Max must be the ace pilot which she faced in real combat. Max asks Milia out on a date, and Milia accepts although she secretly plots to kill him. Later, when Max meets with her in a park, Milia reveals that she is a Zentradi and tries to kill him with a knife. After a short fight, Max disarms her. Beaten for a third time, she falls to her knees, begins to cry and asks Max to kill her. Yet, despite everything that has occurred, Max puts his finger under her chin and the two look into each other's eyes for a long moment. It is then that Milia has a revelation: that the emotion Max had awoken in her was not hate, but love. The two seem to float towards each other and then passionately kiss. They are then quickly married and Milia puts her life as a Zentradi warrior behind her, choosing instead to live with Max.

After defecting to the Macross and marrying Max, Milia was allowed to become a member of the UN Spacy in her own right and piloted a red-painted VF-1J Valkyrie fighter into battle thereafter as her husband's wingmate. However, caring for her own people, she convinced Max and the other pilots to capture, rather than kill, their Zentradi opponents. This deed actually saved the ship during an all out attack by her race to destroy the ship as it, among other events, led to mutiny in the Zentradi forces severe enough for Commander Vrlitwhai to call a ceasefire.

After the Zentradi Fleet that nearly destroys the Earth is vanquished, Max and Milia settle down in the new city built around the SDF-1 Macross. In March 2011, Milia gives birth to a daughter (the first of seven) who is named Komilia Maria Fallyna Jenius. The name Komilia (which means "Little Milia") is chosen because, with her green hair and green eyes, she looks so much like her mother (although it has also been suggested that the "ko" simply refers to the Japanese kanji character "child" that is often used on the end of Japanese female personal names – a suggestion which is supported by the title of the episode 30: Viva Maria, as opposed to Viva Komilia) Komilia proves how related the Humans and Zentradi are as she is the "first stellar interracial child". She proves to be an unabashed baby who is tough enough to handle Milia's often inexperienced handling. Komilia is also very playful with Max's long hair, and pulls on it while giggling.

The birth of her first child was another profoundly moving event for Milia when the artificially gestated woman realized that she created life inside her own body. It takes time for Milia to learn about motherhood – when Misa Hayase asks if she could hold Komilia, Milia initially refuses and tells Misa "If you want to hold a baby, why not make one of your own? I made this one." When Milia does agree, she throws Komilia to Misa, who barely manages to catch the baby in time. Komilia proves adorable to Misa Hayase and Claudia LaSalle, who are amazed that she doesn't appear to be shy at all, and envy Milia for having such a beautiful little girl. Misa is overjoyed when she gets the opportunity to hold Komilia while she and Claudia admire her, argue who should hold her, and make her laugh. Later, Komilia can be seen peacefully asleep in her mother's arms. Milia, despite her past as a ruthless Zentradi warrior, embraces her role as a mother and feels as much love for Komilia as any human mother could feel towards her child.

Komilia, along with her parents, plays an important role in the U.N.' capture of a factory satellite in November 2011. After blasting into the enemy command ship in their fighters, Max and Milia face the hostile Zentradi and Milia reaches into her fighter and lifts baby Komilia (in a tiny pink and white spacesuit) into view, causing the enemy Zentradi who have never seen a baby before to recoil in shock and fear. Komilia coos as she brings her hands to the faceshield of her helmet in an effort to rub her eyes, promoting the Zentradi to shout "It moves!"

Milia, smiling, states "This is called a baby. Her name is Komilia Maria Fallyna Jenius. She'll gradually grow bigger until she's the same size as us. She was created by the two of us," as she motions towards Max. Milia then raises Komilia high over her head, proudly proclaiming her birth to be a symbol of protoculture. The hostile Zentradi now filled with terror, abandon their posts, which causes disorder and allows the U.N. forces and the allied Zentradi to destroy the enemy fleet and seize the factory.

===== Role in Macross Do You Remember Love? =====
Just as in the original The Super Dimension Fortress Macross, Milia is depicted as an ace pilot. Milia is first seen when the Meltrandi breached Vrlitwhai Kridanik's Nupetiet-Vergnitzs battleship. As she entered the ship, Milia starts killing every Zentran she sees, and after executing her task, flees with gusto.

Milia's subsequent appearance in the movie is during the battle between the Macross fleet and the Meltrandi. In this battle, Milia entered into Lap Lamiz's ship with a tailing Maximilian Jenius behind her. She was shot down within the ship. Upon breaching the Queadluun-Rau armor, Max is enamored by Milia (as she is with him) and expresses his awe of the Meltran pilot. Milia and Max are finally seen battling together against Boddole Zer and his fleet, Max having been expanded to Meltrandi size.

===== Role in Macross 7 =====
In Macross 7 Milia sports a new short hairdo rather than her original long hair in Macross. Like Max, she doesn't seem to have aged. However, she is sensitive whenever people, especially Basara Nekki, refer to her age.

Milia is elected overwhelmingly as the mayor of City 7, the largest and main ship of the Macross 7 colonization fleet. She is accompanied by Mylene, her daughter, who lives separately. Max is also present as commander of the Macross 7 fleet, although the couple are now separated. It is also implied that she still may have feelings for her estranged husband.

As City 7's Mayor, Milia is determined not only to maintain law and order among her citizens, but to marry off the rebellious Mylene as well. In the series, Milia still possesses her red VF-1J Valkyrie, and like Max, she can still fly a Valkyrie exceptionally and as passionately as she did in the original The Super Dimension Fortress Macross. Milia clearly shows signs of affection towards her antique red VF-1J when it was destroyed by Sivil while being piloted by Gamlin Kizaki.

Later in the series, Milia, while serving as City 7's mayor, would from time-to-time pilot her Valkyrie – first piloting her VF-1J and gradually moving on to more advanced Valkyries, the VF-17D Nightmare and VF-22S Sturmvogel II respectively, all of which are colored deep red – to assist the battle of the Macross 7 fleet against the Protodeviln and their Varauta Army. In the final episode of Macross 7, Milia and Max fought side-by-side in their own custom colored VF-22 Sturmvogel variable fighters against Lord Geperunitch.

===== In other media =====
- In the sequel series Macross Frontier there is a Meltlan pilot called Klan Klang who dons a red Queadluun-Rhea power armor (the successor to the Queadluun-Rau) as the captain of the S.M.S Pixie Platoon. She has blue hair and like Milia, seems to be in love with a human pilot, Mikhail Blanc, who resembles Max. However, their relationship is a rocky one, and made difficult as Klan's adult body would convert to a childlike physical appearance upon micronization.
- Klan's red Queadluun-Rea is a reference to Milia's red Queadluun-Rau, which appeared in Macross: Do You Remember Love?
- Milia's granddaughter Mirage from Macross Delta shares many similarities with her. Aside from being a pilot, Mirage also has an antagonistic relationship with a possible love interest, Hayate Immelman, who himself also flies a blue fighter jet.
- In one episode of Delta, Mirage and Hayate fly red and blue VF-1EXs similar to those of Milia and Max.

==== Quamzin Kravshera ====
Quamzin Kravshera
- Macross character
- First appearance: Episode 7 – "Bye Bye Mars"
- Voiced by: Kōsuke Meguro / Illich Guardiola

In-universe information
- Species: Zentradi

Voice actor Kōsuke Meguro performed Quamzin Kravshera in the original Japanese TV version and in The Super Dimension Fortress Macross: Do You Remember Love? movie adaptation. In the English dub of the original Japanese series released by ADV Films in January 2006 he was voiced by Illich Guardiola.

Quamzin Kravshera was a brilliant but mentally unstable Zentradi commander during Space War I of the fictional Macross universe. Known as "The Ally Killer" for his aggressive tactics that usually involve destroying both the enemies and his own men. He supposedly died with Moruk Lap Lamiz in 2012, in one last suicidal attempt to destroy the SDF-1 Macross.

He entered Space War I when the commander of the Adoclas fleet, Britai Kridanik, ordered his battalion to join up with Britai's fleet to aid in the capture of the Macross. The choice of Quamzin was a particularly unsettling one for Britai's archivist Exsedol Folmo who believed Quamzin to be irrational, selfish, violent and as dangerous to his own side as to the enemy. This perception was reinforced when, while recklessly coming out of spacefold right into the main fleet, Quamzin's ships collided with some of Britai's force — and that Quamzin and his men had placed bets on how many ships they'd hit. He was immediately dispatched to Mars in a plot to disable the Macross while she was landed and taking supplies from an abandoned U.N. Spacy base on the planet. The plan failed. However, this merely led the megalomaniacal Quamzin to continue to redouble his efforts, including disobeying Britai's direct order on not harming the Macross while conducting an intimidation barrage. He destroyed the Macross' radar installations, forcing Misa Hayase, Hikaru Ichijyo, Maximilian Jenius and Hayao Kakizaki to conduct a recon mission, and resulting in the foursome's capture.

Finally, Quamzin undertook a daring, almost suicidal plan—he used the Macross' devastating "Daedalus Attack" against the ship by forcing his troops up the Daedalus' boarding ramp. In the end, Quamzin's troops were able to do massive damage to Macross City before the assault fell apart. Some of the Zentradi who had taken part in the assault were actually defectors smitten by the ship's culture and the ship's resident singer, Lynn Minmay. As Quamzin got wind of the idea, he began to turn on all of his troops, and finally succeeded in inadvertently chasing them all off the ship.

Soon after, Boddole Zer, the commander of the Zentradi fleet, arrived to finally put an end to what he saw as the corrosive effects of culture. Quamzin, unwilling to take part in a Zentradi civil war (Britai and his fleet had recently decided to take up the defense of the Earth alongside Macross) departed for parts unknown, and disappeared from the historical record for two years.

Those two years had been spent building a base for a Zentradi militarist revival. He recruited Zentradi who had either been not fully "cultured" or who had grown disenchanted with their new, peaceful lives and wanted to return to a time of constant warfare. In the jungles of South America, his small but loyal cadre worked to restore a Zentradi ship that had crash-landed intact during the battle with Boddole Zer and, in furtherance of this goal, assaulted a number of newly established cities across the globe. Among the most damaging of the assaults was the last one, the battle of Onogi City on Christmas Eve, 2011. Quamzin, as he and his forces left with the reactor that was their target, left a nasty surprise behind: Detonator-controlled bombs that levelled great swathes of the city. With the reactor, the restoration of the ship was complete.

Quamzin, with a fully operational Zentradi ship under his feet again, was ready to do the thing Britai never did: Incapacitate or destroy the Macross. In January 2012, Quamzin's ship, with his new love, Moruk Lap Lamiz (the two had made this one concession to a culture they otherwise despised) on board, made their run for Macross City in Alaska. The run ended with Quamzin ramming his vessel into the Macross, causing massive damage to both ships. With that, he was presumed dead, although the Zentradi militarist resistance he helped foster would still be active as late as the 2050s.

== Macross II ==
- Hibiki Kanzaki
- Ishtar
- Silvie Gena
- Exxegran
- Lord Feff
- Lord Emperor Ingues

== Macross M3 ==
- Moaramia Jenius

== Macross Plus ==
- Isamu Alva Dyson (Takumi Yamazaki)
- Guld Goa Bowman (Unshou Ishizuka)
- Myung Fang Lone (Rica Fukami)
- Lucy McMillan (Megumi Hayashibara)
- Sharon Apple (Mako Hyōdō)
- Marge Gueldoa (Show Hayami)
- Millard Johnson (Kenji Utsumi)
- Yang Neumann (Tomohiro Nishimura)
- Kate Masseau (Urara Takano)

=== Sharon Apple ===
Sharon Apple is an artificial idol. She exists as a computer which produces a hologram. While her producers say that she has an artificial intelligence that includes emotional programming, it is later revealed that this programming is incomplete and her emotions are provided by Myung Fang Lone. In public, Sharon appears as a black box, with a red optical sensor for a 'face'.

Myung Fang Lone masquerades as Sharon's producer, and during the concerts she is connected to Apple's system to create the unique music that has swept the galaxy. However, the lead scientist on the project, Marge Gueldoa, goes against the wishes of others on the project and implants an illegal chip into her system. This chip makes Apple an artificial lifeform complete with sentience and emotion.

Because of the close connection with Myung, Apple becomes intrigued by Myung's childhood friends, the test pilots Isamu Alva Dyson and Guld Goa Bowman. Apple causes a fire, and warns the two of the danger to see how they react.

When Gueldoa takes Apple to earth for a concert in Macross City, she begins a plan to take over the city by hacking into the Macross and a new experimental X-9 Ghost drone ship. Isamu and Guld both arrive to stop her. During the course of the battle, she traps Myung and reveals her plan to show her love for Isamu by giving him the ultimate thrill that he has been looking for. Her plan is to kill him, and she uses the defenses of the Macross as well as her own hypnotic powers.

Guld is killed in the battle, and through the efforts of Myung and Isamu, Apple is defeated and destroyed.

=== Guld Goa Bowman ===
A Zentradi/human hybrid, Guld grew up with his two friends Myung and Isamu on the rural planet of Eden. He shared a fascination for flying with Isamu, and the two managed to build a man powered flying machine together. Another thing he shared with Isamu was his love for Myung. One day Guld walked in on Isamu and Myung sharing a tender moment. His Zentradi warlike tendencies explode with jealous rage and he attacks his two former friends. As a result, Guld knocked out Isamu and sexually assaulted Myung. The trio broke up, with Myung and Isamu leaving Eden. Alone on Eden, Guld's psyche managed to suppress the memories of his assault, convincing him that he was protecting Myung from Isamu's unwanted advances.

Years later, he became an employee for General Galaxy, both as a designer of variable fighters and a test pilot. His pet project, the controversial mind controlled YF-21, became General Galaxy's entry in the Project Super Nova competition. Much to his distaste, the test pilot for Shinsei Industries' YF-19, is none other than his old rival Isamu. The competition between the two, flamed by their old rivalries, becomes a bitter one. Things get even more complicated when Myung shows up in Eden as well, now the producer for the popular AI singer Sharon Apple who is on tour. In an early test flight of the YF-21, Guld fantasizes about forcing Isamu's VF-11 Thunderbolt to crash (having been rescued from a certainly fatal crash by Isamu's quick thinking himself moments earlier). The YF-21's control system interprets this as a command and pushes down hard on Isamu's fighter, forcing it to crash, which Isamu survives with only superficial injuries. Guld, determined to win, even manages to sabotage one of the tests in his favour by swapping live ammunition into Isamu's gun pod, which he later uses to fire into the YF-19 and nearly kills Isamu (he had been originally intending for the ammunition to be used by Isamu against him, to make it look as though Isamu had plotted to murder him).

Just as Guld is starting to patch things up between him and Myung, she leaves for Earth to attend the 30th anniversary celebrations for the end of the Space War. Meanwhile, Project Super Nova is cancelled when U.N. Spacy announce that they will go for the A.I. controlled X-9 Ghost. While Guld is mulling this, Isamu steals the YF-19 to stop the Ghost's inauguration on Earth. Guld is then tasked to bring him back using the YF-21. He succeeds in tracking down his rival and an intense dogfight ensues. During the duel, Guld accuses Isamu of stealing Myung from him, of ruining everything. Just as Guld landed a mortal shot on Isamu, all the suppressed memories flood back in, and Guld realizes his mistake.

Luckily for the grieving Guld, Isamu managed to escape in the last moment. But just as they start to bond again, the X-9 Ghost appears, now controlled by the crazed Sharon Apple and attacks the two. Guld recommends Isamu that he leave this fight to him, and to rescue Myung instead. The fight goes in the Ghost's favour in the beginning, as Guld can barely keep up with the Ghost's aerobatics – as the fighter was computer controlled, it could move at velocities and maneuver in such ways that would kill a typical pilot. Realizing he has no other options, Guld removes all the inhibitors from the YF-21, allowing him to execute dangerously high-G maneuvers. He reconciles with both Isamu and Myung over the radio one last time and ultimately sacrifices himself to destroy the X-9 Ghost.

=== Isamu Alva Dyson ===
Born on Earth, March 27, 2015, Isamu Dyson grew up with his two friends Myung and Guld on the rural planet of Eden. A student of Della Musica High School, he shared a fascination for flying with Guld, and would often go chasing the planet's indigenous giant birds just to watch them fly. Another thing he shared with Guld was his love for Myung. When he and Myung finally had a tender moment, Guld walked in on them and exploded with rage, attacking his former friends. The trio broke up and both Myung and Isamu leave planet Eden separately.

Not long after, on September 1, 2034, Isamu realized his dream of flying by joining the U.N. Spacy as a fighter pilot. He showed his extraordinary skill again and again as he fought renegade Zentradi in his VF-11 Thunderbolt variable fighter, leading to an astronomical kill count. However his skill came with a penchant for showmanship, daredevilry, and an independent smart-mouthed personality—vices that did not endear him to his superiors, no matter how skilled he was. An incident during an asteroid skirmish finally convinced his superiors to get rid of him by assigning him to Project Super Nova as a test pilot, ironically something Isamu had desired for a long time.

The move transferred him to New Edwards Test Flight Center on his home planet of Eden, on January 5, 2040. There he becomes Shinsei Industries' newest test pilot, flying their prototype the YF-19. To his surprise he finds that his former friend Guld is the test pilot for the opposing team vying for the contract, and a bitter rivalry—fueled by old differences—arises between the two that gets transferred to the competition—a rivalry that soon comes to low blows. Things are further complicated when Myung shows up on Eden as well, as the producer for the galactic sensation Sharon Apple. Meanwhile, Isamu also develops what he perceives as a rivalry with the base commander, Col. Millard Johnson, who uses a gruff demeanor and feigned disdain for the hotheaded young pilot to push him to try and use his airframe to its utmost limits.

When Project Super Nova is cancelled due to the introduction of the unmanned X-9 "Ghost" drone, hotheaded Isamu steals the YF-19, aided and abetted by its chief engineer, Yang Neumann, and heads to Earth to disrupt the Ghost's inauguration. There he finds that he was followed by Guld, who was sent to bring him back, and a dogfight breaks between them. During the fight, the two finally confront each other with their grievances and in the end manage to settle them and become friends again. The new alliance is tested when the crazed Sharon Apple takes control of the Ghost and attacks them. Guld however convinces Isamu to leave and rescue the imprisoned Myung. There he is faced by intense fire from the Macross itself, also controlled by Sharon Apple. Soon after, Isamu succumbs to Sharon's hypnotizing powers and takes his fighter into a death plunge. But thanks to Myung's singing he breaks free from Sharon's hold and destroys her. Unfortunately Guld is killed during his battle with the Ghost in a kamikaze-like attack, destroying both himself and the drone.

In the movie version, Isamu is last seen standing with Myung on the platform of the Macross, and she promptly sings "Voices", as he puts an arm around her shoulder, winning her at last. Isamu also made a brief cameo appearance in Macross Frontier: The Wings of Goodbye as a member of S.M.S. fighting against the Vajra.

=== Myung Fang Lone ===
Myung grew up on the planet Eden with her two best friends Isamu Alva Dyson and Guld Goa Bowman. Singing was her passion, and her song "Voices" was a hit during her school's festival. She, Isamu and Guld were a love triangle that eventually exploded when Guld found Myung and Isamu having a tender moment, and ended with Guld assaulting his two friends. The trio broke up and Myung left Eden soon after.

Years later, Myung returned to Eden as the producer for Sharon Apple, the computerized singer on tour. The secret was that Sharon Apple was incomplete. She had no emotions. Myung's real job was to supply these emotions. On Eden, Myung is shocked when she meets Isamu and Guld there, the two now pilots competing in the Super Nova Project. The reunion brings back the old rivalry between the two and feelings that Myung thought she had left behind.

Before settling matters between her and her two suitors, she leaves Eden with Sharon Apple for Earth to celebrate the anniversary of the armistice between the humans and the Zentradi. There, the awakened Sharon Apple imprisons Myung so she can have free rein with Isamu and Guld. It also reveals Myung's love for Guld, but greater love for Isamu. Myung manages to free herself and stop Sharon Apple, but not before she settles all the lingering emotions with her two friends.

Isamu is later seen in the second movie of Macross Frontier, Sayonara no Tsubasa. Flying his old YF-19. Revealing that Isamu, left the conventional military sometime between 2040 and 2059 and joined the S.M.S.

=== Lucy Macmillan ===
Lucy is a researcher for Shinsei Industries assigned to the YF-19 project. It is there that she meets the young and rough test pilot Isamu who immediately attracts her by his roguish nature and the bold way he asked her out for a date. She unwittingly gets herself entangled in the bitter love triangle between Isamu and his two ex best friends Myung Fang Lone and Guld Goa Bowman. In the end she reluctantly relinquishes her hopes for a romantic relationship with Isamu.

=== Yang Neumann ===
A brilliant variable fighter designer and a genius hacker at only sixteen, Yang is a true prodigy by all standards. Shinsei Industries was confident enough in his genius to make him the chief engineer for their experimental fighter; the YF-19, their entry for the competition to select U.N. Spacy's next gen fighter known as Project Super Nova. Due to his age, he is the butt of a lot of jokes, especially from his test pilot Isamu who likes nothing better than to ruin Yang's precious prototypes with his dare devil antics.

Yang is also a huge fan of Sharon Apple, and has used his hacker skills to infiltrate her highly guarded computer systems in an effort to steal her AI. He has all the parts except her emotions module which has proven to be beyond his skills since, unbeknownst to him, it doesn't actually exist (Sharon's emotions are actually provided by her alleged producer Myung Fan Lone).

When Project Super Nova gets cancelled, he correctly predicts that Isamu is going to steal the YF-19 to stop the inauguration of its replacement, the X-9 Ghost, back in Macross City and manages to convince the hot headed pilot to take him along for the ride. When the crazed Sharon Apple takes control of the city she also successfully hypnotizes Yang into shooting Isamu. He misses and Isamu ejects him from the plane, presumably landing somewhere safe.

=== Milliard Johnson ===
Chief Millard Johnson is in charge of Project Super Nova, a UN Spacy program deployed to determine the next generation of Variable fighter. Chief Millard is most often found in the anime trying to control the feud between Guld Goa Bowman and Isamu Alva Dyson, many times counseling Isamu with words of wisdom that mostly infuriate the young pilot. In Macross Plus the Movie, after Isamu stole the YF-19 to interfere with the introduction of Ghost X-9 UCAV and Guld was sent in the YF-21 after the runaway VF, Millard commented that he used to steal planes as well and decided to cover up for the two of them just like his then-superiors did for him. Whether he stole planes as a covert job or simply as an act of misconduct remains unexplained.

== Macross 7 ==
- Basara Nekki (speaking Nobutoshi Hayashi, singing Yoshiki Fukuyama)
- Mylene Flare Jenius (speaking Tomo Sakurai, singing Chie Kajiura)
- Emilia Jenius
- Ray Lovelock (Masashi Sugawara)
- Veffidas Feaze (Urara Takano)
- Gamlin Kizaki (Takehito Koyasu)
- Akiko Hojo (Urara Takano)
- Michael Johnson (Takehiro Murozono)
- Miho Miho (Rio Natsuki)
- Sally (Junko Iwao)
- Kinryu (Hiroki Takahashi)
- Docker (Takashi Nagasako)
- Physica S. Fulcrum (Akio Suyama)
- Rex (Kaoru Shimamura)
- Dr. Chiba (Keiichi Sonobe)
- Girl With Flowers (Akiko Nakagawa)
- Luis Eggy (Dick Man)
- Commander Chlore (Kotono Mitsuishi)
- Advisor Tranquil
- Lord Geperunitch
- Gigil
- Sivil
- Glavil
- Gavil
- Gavigula
- Valgo
- Natter-Valgo
- Goram
- Zomd

== Characters introduced in Macross Zero ==
=== Shin Kudo ===
Shin Kudo (工藤 シン, Kudō Shin) is a Japanese/American fighter pilot flying for the UN. As a child in 1999, he witnesses the fall of the Macross and the following U.N. Wars. His family is killed before his eyes, a memory that would haunt him and turn him into a quiet and untrusting person. He joins the U.N. Spacy as an F-14 fighter pilot. During a mission he is shot down by the anti-U.N.'s transformable SV-51 and lands in Mayan Island. He later flies the VF-0 Phoenix variable fighter under the tutelage of Roy Focker. Aside from his rear-seat radar intercept officer, Edgar La Salle, he has few friends and is slow to trust. His interactions with the cheerful Mao Nome and his growing attraction to her more reserved sister, Sara, help him open up.

During the final episode, the extraterrestrial object known as Bird Human by the Mayan people awakens, assimilating Sara into the cockpit located at its head. He manages to break through the Bird Human's attacks and makes Sara realise that it is Shin instead of an evil spirit (called a "Kadun" by the Mayans). The UN forces, however, see the Bird Human as a liability and launch reaction weapons at it. Sara sacrifices herself to save Shin and the rest of the Mayan Island which would have been destroyed by the nuclear fallout. The Bird Human is critically damaged from the blasts and shoots off into space incredibly fast in what appears to be a space fold. Shin's VF-0 suffers engine damage from the blasts and plunges towards the ocean. He is seemingly saved from certain death by Sara. Finally, an amazed Mao Nome watches Shin and his damaged fighter ascending into space in the same way that the Bird Human did. In the tenth episode of the 2007 sequel Macross Frontier, the events of Zero are portrayed in a movie. Frontier protagonist Alto Saotome, a former kabuki actor, agreed to appear as Kudo during an underwater sequence that the original actor refused to do.

In the Japanese-language website for Macross Zero, his name is romanized as Shin Kudou. The character is voiced by Kenichi Suzumura.

=== Edgar LaSalle ===
Edgar LaSalle (エドガー・ラサール, Edogā Rasāru) is Shin's Radar Intercept Officer and best friend. Voiced by Sousuke Komori.

=== Sara Nome ===
As Mayan Island's priestess/shaman, a position of great spiritual importance to the people of the secluded island, Sara Nome (サラ・ノーム, Sara Nomu) has the mystical power of interacting with the island's mysterious alien ruins, a little-understood ability that she manifests through singing an ancient Mayan chant. She also gets occasional visions into the future. This power seems to run through her family's blood as her little sister, Mao Nome, also displays the same abilities to a lesser degree.

As a child, she agrees to let a visiting scientist test her blood, an act forbidden by the island's traditions, in exchange for a pretty bauble. The test confirms her special skills and later makes the island's inhabitants the focus of research and armed conflict. Due to this incident Sara grows up to become suspicious of outsiders and very protective of her people's beliefs. She resents the wind of change that the abrupt arrival of U.N. pilot Shin Kudo brings to her home, yet she realizes how powerless she is against it as she foresees the destruction and violence that is to come.

In the final episode, the extraterrestrial object known as Bird Human awakens due to Sara's chant, assimilating her into its head. Shin Kudo manages to break through the Bird Human's attacks and makes Sara realise that it is him instead of an evil spirit (called a "Kadun" by the Mayans). The U.N. Forces, however, see the Bird Human as an uncontrollable liability and launch several reaction missiles at it. Sara sacrifices herself to save Shin and the rest of the Mayan Island, which would have been destroyed by the nuclear fallout. She makes the Bird Human create a force field that keeps the explosions away from the island. The Bird Human becomes critically damaged from the blasts and then shoots off into space incredibly fast, in what appears to be a space fold, with Sara Nome still inside.

This character is voiced by Sanae Kobayashi.

=== Mao Nome ===
Mao Nome (マオ・ノーム, Mao Nomu) appears in Macross Zero, voiced by Yuuka Nanri, the Macross Frontier TV series and its movie adaptation.

A member of the Mayan people who live in an island on the South Pacific, Mao initially knows nothing but her home, like her older sister Sara. Mao's fascination with the technology that the outsiders bring masks her deep mystical link to the island's mysterious alien ruins, a link she shares with her sister. The sudden arrival of Shin Kudo to the island in 2008 sparks dreams of freedom in eleven-year-old Mao, who then yearns for a life in the cities beyond the island. Unlike her older sister Sara, she is carefree and spritelike. She becomes infatuated with Shin, impressed by his skill in manipulating and repairing the island's scarce machinery.

In Macross Frontier, set in 2059, a version of the Macross Zero story is produced in-universe in which she is played by the character Ranka Lee. Her adoptive brother Ozma is also shown reflecting on his sister playing "Doctor Mao" indicating that she may have more than a few links to that series. This assertion is further developed when research into the past of Sheryl Nome, Mao's granddaughter, shows that during 2047 a fifty-year-old Mao (who survived the events of Space War I) was the chief scientist of the 117th Long Distance Research Fleet with a background researching the Protoculture Civilization and also headed a project to manage and prevent an alien infection (the V-Type infection) with Grace O'Connor and Ranshe Mei (Ranka's mother) as her assistants. She is seen briefly in a wheelchair along with Ranka's family, and is presumed to have been killed during the Vajra attack on the 117th fleet in 2048.

=== D.D. Ivanov ===
D.D. Ivanov appears in Macross Zero and is voiced by the Japanese actor Ryūzaburō Ōtomo.

As a former U.N. Spacy pilot, D.D.Ivanov (D.D.イワノフ, Dī Dī Iwanofu) (or "Daisy" as he is affectionately known by his friends and comrades) was Roy Focker's instructor. After defecting to the Anti-U.N. side, D.D. becomes the leader of a squadron of experimental SV-51 variable fighters. The reason for his defection remains unknown. Sent by the Anti-U.N. as part of the team investigating the alien ruins in Mayan Island, the mission brings him into conflict with his former student, Focker. An intense rivalry develops between the two as they continue to dogfight to a standstill throughout the whole campaign.

Ivanov was later killed when his SV-51 was blown apart by the power of the Bird Human while attempting to avenge the death of his lover and wingman Nora Polyansky.

=== Nora Polyansky ===
Nora Polyansky (ノーラ・ポリャンスキー, Nōra Poryansukī) appears in the animated video series Macross Zero voiced by Minami Takayama.

She debuts as a 25-year-old Anti-U.N. variable fighter pilot who single-handedly takes down a squadron of U.N. Spacy F-14's, including one piloted by protagonist Shin Kudo, with the new Anti-U.N. SV-51 variable fighter. Highly skilled in both flying and close quarters combat, she is dedicated to the defeat of the U.N. forces who have killed her family and inflicted a huge scar, both physical and mental, upon her. She is attached to the SV-51 squadron led by D.D. Ivanov and acts as his wingmate, right hand pilot and lover. Ruthless in her mission, she represents Shin's chief rival in the sky and on the ground.

She is killed in the final episode of the series by an energy blast from the Protoculture biomecha known as the Bird Human while attempting to shoot down Shin's VF-0.

== See also ==
- List of Macross Frontier characters
- List of Macross Delta characters
