= Kazutaka Miyatake =

Japanese visual artist and anime designer (born 1949)

- 宮武 一貴
- Born: Kazutaka Watanabe; September 21, 1949 (age 77); Yokosuka, Kanagawa, Japan
- Education: Tokyo University of Agriculture and Technology
- Occupations: Visual artist; mechanical designer
- Spouse: Tomoko Watanabe (died 2021)

Kazutaka Watanabe (Japanese: 渡邊 一貴, Hepburn: Watanabe Kazutaka; born September 21, 1949), better known as Kazutaka Miyatake (宮武 一貴, Miyatake Kazutaka), is a Japanese visual artist and anime designer known for the mechanical design of the Macross TV series and a number of its continuations from Studio Nue, of which he is a founding member. He has also contributed to the mecha design of other series such as Mobile Suit Gundam SEED Destiny.

== Mechanical design ==
Miyatake has designed the spaceships of several famous anime series. His attention to detail and mechanical realism have made his designs still admired upon and used in anime series and related products after several years of their initial appearance in visual media. One of Miyatake's most famous designs is the SDF-1 Macross spacecraft. Other designs of note have been his Gatlantis Empire spaceship designs for Space Battleship Yamato II and the Zentradi spaceships and mecha from Macross as well as the titular mecha from the Dunbine and Orguss TV series and the Gunbuster original video animation (OVA).

He also created the Mobile Infantry power armor design for a Japanese edition of the Starship Troopers 1959 novel in the 1970s. This design has been featured in the Daicon III and IV Opening Animations from 1981 and 1983, as well as the Starship Troopers OVA adaptation from 1988.

== Personal life ==
Miyatake was married to Tomoko Watanabe (born 1960/1961). On May 22, 2021, a fire broke out at their home in Yokosuka. As a result, he suffered from carbon monoxide poisoning and was taken to hospital along with his wife who later succumbed to her injuries.

== Works ==
- Space Battleship Yamato (1974) – mechanical designer
- Farewell to Space Battleship Yamato (1978) – mechanical design
- Space Battleship Yamato II (1978–1979) – mechanical designer
- Daicon III and IV Opening Animations (1981/1983) – mechanical design (uncredited)
- Super Dimension Fortress Macross (1982) – mechanical designer
- Crusher Joe (1983) – mechanical designer
- Super Dimension Century Orguss (1983) – mechanical designer
- Aura Battler Dunbine (1983–1984) – mechanical designer, theme song lyrics
- Macross: Do You Remember Love? (1984) – mechanical designer
- Dirty Pair: Project Eden (1986) – mechanical design
- The Super Dimension Fortress Macross: Flash Back 2012 (1987) – mechanical designer
- Starship Troopers (1988) – mechanical designer
- Gunbuster (1988–1989) – mechanical designer
- Super Dimensional Fortress Macross II: Lovers Again (1992) – original mechanical design
- Dirty Pair Flash (1994–1996) – mecha designer
- Macross Plus (1994) – original mechanical designer
- Macross 7 (1994–1995) – mechanical and creature designer
- Doraemon: Nobita Drifts in the Universe (1999) – mechanical design
- Angel Links (1999) – mechanical concept design
- RahXephon (2002) – artistic concept
- Mobile Suit Gundam SEED (2002–2003) – design cooperation
- Macross Zero (2002–2004) – production setting designer
- RahXephon: Pluralitas Concentio (2003) – set design
- Submarine 707R (2003) – mechanical design
- My-HiME (2004–2005) – creature design (Kagutsuchi and Orfan – S. Nue)
- Mobile Suit Gundam SEED Destiny (2004–2005) – design cooperation
- Genesis of Aquarion (2005) – design assistant (episodes 2–13)
- Eureka Seven (2005–2006) – conceptual design
- Glass Fleet (2006) – mechanical designer
- Flag (2006) – mechanical designer
- My-Otome Zwei (2006–2007) – design
- Gigantic Formula (2007) – mechanical design (Xuanwushan-III)
- My-Otome 0: S.ifr (2008) – creature design
- Macross Frontier (2008) – conceptual design
- Infinite Space (2009) – spaceship designer
- The Girl Who Leapt Through Space (2009) – design
- Super Robot Wars Original Generation: The Inspector (2010–2011) – mechanical design
- Star Blazers: Space Battleship Yamato 2199 (2013) – conceptual design
- Armored Core VI: Fires of Rubicon (2023) – mechanical design

== Bibliography ==
- Miyatake, Kazutaka (2005). Miyatake Kazutaka Makurosu ando Ōgasu Dezain Wākusu 宮武一貴 マクロス&オーガス デザインワークス [Kazutaka Miyatake Macross & Orguss Design Works]. Mechanical Design Works Series (in Japanese). Tokyo: Movic. ISBN 4-89601-629-7.
