= Macross Zero =

Japanese anime OVA (original video animation)

- DVD 1 cover

マクロス ゼロ (Makurosu Zero)
- Genre: Adventure, Mecha, Military science fiction
- Created by: Studio Nue; Shōji Kawamori
- Original video animation
- Directed by: Shōji Kawamori
- Written by: Hiroshi Ōnogi
- Music by: Kuniaki Haishima
- Studio: Satelight
- Licensed by: Big West (licensing) Disney Platform Distribution (worldwide streaming license); UK/NA: Anime Limited (home video)
- Released: December 21, 2002 – October 22, 2004
- Runtime: 30 minutes (each)
- Episodes: 5

Macross Zero (マクロス ゼロ, Makurosu Zero) is an anime prequel OVA to The Super Dimension Fortress Macross released for the celebration of the 20th anniversary of the Macross franchise during 2002 in Japan. It was created and directed by Shoji Kawamori and produced by Satelight.

== Premise ==
Macross Zero is set in 2008 A.D., one year before the events of the original Macross series, depicting the final battles of the U.N. Wars between the U.N. Spacy and the Anti-UN forces, and is also set in the South Pacific, where a gigantic alien spaceship crash landed 9 years earlier. Amidst the violence, a U.N. Spacy F-14 KAI pilot named Shin Kudo is attacked by a strange enemy aircraft that can transform itself into a robot. Crash landing on Mayan Island he learns that this remote island and its peaceful native inhabitants hold a great secret linking them to the alien space ship and would become the focus of the war, whether they like it or not. Shin eventually returns to his carrier fleet and joins the Skull Squadron, who also operate brand new transforming fighters, the VF-0 Phoenix. He trains and engages Anti-UN forces operating from a converted ballistic missile submarine as both sides fight to locate and control alien artifacts, with the peaceful and agrarian Mayan caught in the middle of the war.

== Characters ==
- Shin Kudo (工藤 シン, Kudō Shin): Japanese-American fighter pilot flying for the UN. Lost his parents early in the U.N. Wars. Voiced by Kenichi Suzumura.
- Sara Nome: Priestess of Mayan Island. Highly skeptical of outsiders and the violence they bring with them. Voiced by Sanae Kobayashi.
- Mao Nome: Sara's younger sister. Cheerful and outgoing, and longing to see the outside world. Also has a very obvious crush on Shin. Voiced by Yuuka Nanri.
- Roy Föcker: Famed UN ace and test pilot for the new and experimental variable fighter, the VF-0. Voiced by Akira Kamiya.
- Edgar LaSalle: Shin's Radar Intercept Officer and best friend. Voiced by Sousuke Komori.
- D.D. Ivanov: Ace pilot flying for the Anti-UN forces. Roy Föcker's former instructor turned rival. Flies the SV-51 Anti-U.N. variable fighter. Voiced by Ryūzaburō Ōtomo.
- Nora Polyansky: Ivanov's wingmate. A ruthless and highly skilled warrior dedicated to the Anti-UN cause. Voiced by Minami Takayama.
- Aries Turner: A 26-year-old government researcher known for her genius-level intelligence. She studies and gives top secret seminars about the Protoculture research being undertaken by the U.N. She has known Roy Föcker in the past, before the events that will take place in the South Pacific Ocean one year before Space War I. Voiced by Naomi Shindō.
- Nutouk: The Mayan Island tribal chief. Voiced by Tamio Ōki.
- Dr. Hasford: The Anti-UN scientist who theories that intelligent life on Earth might have originated off world from the Protoculture, a race of ancient aliens. Voiced by Nachi Nozawa.
- The Bird Human: Code named by the U.N. Spacy scientists as A.F.O.S. (Artifact From Outer Space), the Bird Human is a powerful semi-sentient alien biomecha which was left on Earth by the true creators of humanity, the Protoculture. The mecha was created to check the evolution of humankind and was programmed to destroy it in case it became belligerent like the previous creation of the Protoculture, the Zentradi.

== Production ==
The OVA was released in 2002 to celebrate the 20th anniversary of the Macross franchise in Japan. New mechanical designs inspired by those of the first Macross series were developed by Shoji Kawamori and Junya Ishigaki, while mecha and sci-fi illustrator Hidetaka Tenjin worked as an animation artist for the CGI mecha action sequences. A Blu-ray box was released on August 22, 2008, which added Sheryl Nome's earrings in a shot at the Nome beach house, to better connect the series with Macross Frontier.

== Episodes ==
| No. | Title | Original release date |
|---|---|---|
| 1 | "Where the Sea Meets the Wind" "Umi to Kaze to" (海と風と) | December 21, 2002 |
In July 1999, an alien spacecraft crash lands in the South Pacific. A war quickly breaks out between the United Nations (UN) and the Anti-Unification Alliance (Anti-UN) over control of the spacecraft. Nine years later, UN pilot Shin Kudo is shot down during a dogfight after an enemy fighter plane transforms into a humanoid mech. Shin wakes up on the mysterious Mayan Island and is seemingly the only survivor from his squad. On the UN Spacy assault carrier Asuka, anthropology researcher Aries Turner presents her findings to the UN's high-command about the possibility of a new origin of humanity, Protoculture; while pilot Roy Föcker tests the UN's new fighter, the transformable VF-0 Phoenix. The Phoenix engages in a fight over Mayan Island and when it transforms into its humanoid form Mayan priestess Sara sees this as the return of the Bird Human, signaling the end of humanity.
| 2 | "Stars of the Land" "Chijō no Hoshi" (地上の星) | May 23, 2003 |
During the battle, Roy notices the insignia on one of the Anti-UN's variable fighters belongs to Ivanov, his former instructor. A Phoenix crash-lands on Mayan, with Shin piloting it to protect Sara's sister, Mao, driving off Ivanov's wingman Nora. Roy sees this and takes Shin back to the Asuka, where Shin learns his co-pilot and best friend Edgar is still alive and the two are assigned to Roy's Skull Squadron. After training with Skull Squadron, Shin and Edgar are sent to Mayan Island to escort Aries so she can continue her research on the Bird Human and find the organism's other fragments. While there, Shin fixes a generator that restores power to the village. The next morning, Shin travels to a spring where he finds Rose singing to a fragment of the Bird Human. Sara's song causes strange reactions around the island, such as dead flowers blooming, floating rocks, and increased cell activity in the blood samples Aries took of the villagers.
| 3 | "Desperate Battle in Blue" "Aoki Shitō" (蒼き死闘) | November 28, 2003 |
Aries and Edgar find the spring, but when Shin explains what he saw Aries thinks he is making fun of her and leaves. Aries's research team on the Asuka informs her that Mao's blood sample is nearly identical in genetic makeup to the Bird-Man specimen on the ship. Mao takes Shin to show him her treasure: a large bio-mechanical head at the bottom of the sea. The Anti-UN forces launch a large-scale attack to retrieve the Bird-Man specimen from the Asuka and the fragment from the sea. Roy manages to defend the Asuaka, but Mayan Island gets caught in the crossfire and the village is destroyed. During the chaos, Mao, the village chief Nutouk, and several villagers are evacuated to the Asuka, while Rose runs into the jungle. Shin chases after her and the two are captured by Nora.
| 4 | "Jungle" "Mitsurin" (密林) | May 28, 2004 |
Shin and Sara are taken to a temple where Nora interrogates Shin over the location of the fragment, revealing that the UN killed her parents, raped her sister, and left a large scar on her chest. Aries is also captured and it is revealed that her mentor Dr. Hasford is still alive and is working for the Anti-UN. Seeing Hasford again traumatizes Sara and she brings a stone pillar to life. Shin frees himself and saves Sara, with the two flying away on the stone pillar, though Nora manages to shot it down and the two are stranded in the mountains. While looking for stranded UN forces, Roy is attacked by Ivanov and their fight ends up over Mayan Island. Roy is shot down, but he survives and manages to rescue Aries, with the two escaping into the forest. On the Asuka, Mao undergoes surgery but won't wake up, so Nutouk and the villagers perform a ceremony to wake her. The ceremony is successful and Mao awakens, but she immediately senses an incoming danger to Mayan. As the sun rises, Anti-UN forces launch a bomb strike on Mayan Island in order to find the missing fragment.
| 5 | "Bird Human" "Tori no Hito" (鳥の人) | October 22, 2004 |
The Anti-UN forces capture the Bird Human's head with Sara and Aries inside, while Roy and Shin are rescued and returned to the Asuka. Nora tells Sara of the UN's Operation: Iconoclasm, in which if the UN cannot retrieve the Bird Human, their forces will destroy it no matter the cost of life or land, which Aries confirms. The Bird Human's head and body begin reaching out to each other, causing both the UN and Anti-UN fleets to float out of the water. Roy and Shin launch in order to stop the reforming of the Bird Human, but are intercepted by Ivanov and Nora. Shin manages to briefly take down Nora's fighter and reach the ship Sara and the head are being held on, but he is seemingly killed in front of Sara. Overcome with grief, Sara awakens the Bird Human and its head and body are reunited and the Song of Destruction begins, immediately destroying a large portion of the fleets, indirectly killing Hasford, and injuring Aries. The UN high command sends an order to launch Operation: Iconoclasm. Shin recovers and goes after the Bird Human to save Sara while Nora and Ivanov are killed by the creature and Roy reunites with Aries before she dies from her wounds. Shin manages to reach Sara with the help of Mao and stop the Song of Destruction, but Sara teleports the Bird Human away into space when Operation: Iconoclasm starts to save Mayan Island from the resulting nuclear fallout. Shin's Phoenix is critically damaged in the blast, but he hears Sara's song and is teleported away by her spirit.

== Soundtrack ==
Composed by Kuniaki Haishima, the OVA's soundtrack is orchestral with some tribal influences. One track, titled "VF-Zero", borrows a section of "Klendathu Drop" by Basil Poledouris, from the Starship Troopers soundtrack. The ending theme for episodes 1 and 5 is "Arkan" (which means "star" in the fictional Mayan language), performed by Holy Raz. "Life Song", the ending theme for episode 2, is by Yen Chang and Holy Raz. Yuuka Nanri performs the episode 3 ending theme "Yanyan".

Two volumes of the soundtrack were released in Japan by Victor Entertainment.

== International release ==
Due to a legal dispute over the distribution rights of the Macross franchise, involving Studio Nue and Big West against Harmony Gold, much of the Macross merchandise post 1999, including Macross Zero, had not received an international release. In September 2024, Crunchyroll announced Macross Zero will receive a limited Blu-ray release. It was released on April 15, 2025.

== OVA series notes ==
Mao Nome's reminiscences have become part of the pre-Space War legendarium of the expanding Human and Zentradi exploration of the Galaxy. The events of the movie paint the story in the style of Tales of the South Pacific, romantic and beautiful in the time before the Zentradi nearly annihilated all life on Earth during one of the most cataclysmic battles of the War. The people of the galaxy know this story as 'Bird Human'.

During the third Macross TV series, Macross Frontier, the 10th episode ("Legend of Zero") retells the events of the OVA series as Bird Human, a movie made in on one of the colony's city ships for the entertainment of the populace. The Four Romances: one completely doomed (Captain Nora and Captain Ivanov), one tragic (Dr. Aries Turner and Captain Roy Föcker - which led to his depression and incipient alcoholism only later broken by Claudia LaSalle), one impossible but real (Mao Nome's love of Shin Kudo), and one transcendental (Sara Nome and Lt. Shin Kudo) make for a story of mysticism, love, music, and courage. The adaptation stars Miranda Merin (the reigning Miss Macross Frontier) as Sara Nome and Ranka Lee as Mao Nome (after the original actress is injured in a car accident on the way to the filming location). Alto Saotome, the main protagonist of Frontier, is the stunt double for the actor playing Shin Kudo (as the actor does not do underwater scenes, as stated in his contract). Incidentally, the film's director bears a striking resemblance to series creator Shoji Kawamori.

Later episodes explicitly state that Macross Frontier singer Sheryl Nome is the granddaughter of Dr. Mao Nome, and showed a photograph of a much older but still recognizable Mao with glasses, clearly now a venerable survivor of Space War I.

== All That VF - Macross 25th Anniversary Air Show (Zero Edition) ==
Coinciding with both the 25th anniversary of Macross and the Blu-ray releases of volume one of Macross Frontier and Macross Zero box set, the official website of Macross Frontier posted two newly animated short films featuring Air Show style demonstrations for both series. People who purchased the first pressings of either Macross Zero or Macross Frontier received a unique code to enter into the website and therefore able to watch the short film of the respective anime.

The music track for this clip was an excerpt from an orchestral track of Macross Frontier titled "Vital Force" composed by Yoko Kanno.

== Reception ==
Kevin Cormack reviewed the series in 2025 for Anime News Network, giving it an overall rank of B. According to the reviewer, the OVA has a different tone than most Macross franchise entries, being darker, more serious, less focused on music and (due to its short length) character development. He praised it for developing the franchise backstory, "spectacular battle scenes" and "interesting environmentalism and cultural anthropology aspects", but criticized its ending, which he described as a vague ending to up-till-then coherent story, and a "poorly-explained, mystical deus ex machina nonsense".

Writing for The Encyclopedia of Science Fiction, Piotr Konieczny described Macross Zero as a comparatively sombre and pessimistic installment of the Macross franchise, highlighting its treatment of imperialism, ecology and the destructive consequences of military technology. The reviewer praised the OVA's elaborate and realistic aerial combat sequences, while noting that their spectacle is repeatedly contrasted with civilian casualties and environmental devastation. The encyclopedia interpreted the series as a retrospective reworking of the franchise's origins, in which humanity's forgotten alien heritage and the technologically advanced Bird Human challenge the distinction between nature and technology and expose the dangers of human aggression. It also considered the portrayal of the indigenous island community memorable but romanticized, and criticized elements of fan service and the subplot involving a young girl's attraction to an adult pilot as discordant with the otherwise mature wartime narrative.
