= Studio Nue =

Japanese planning and production studio

Studio Nue, Inc.
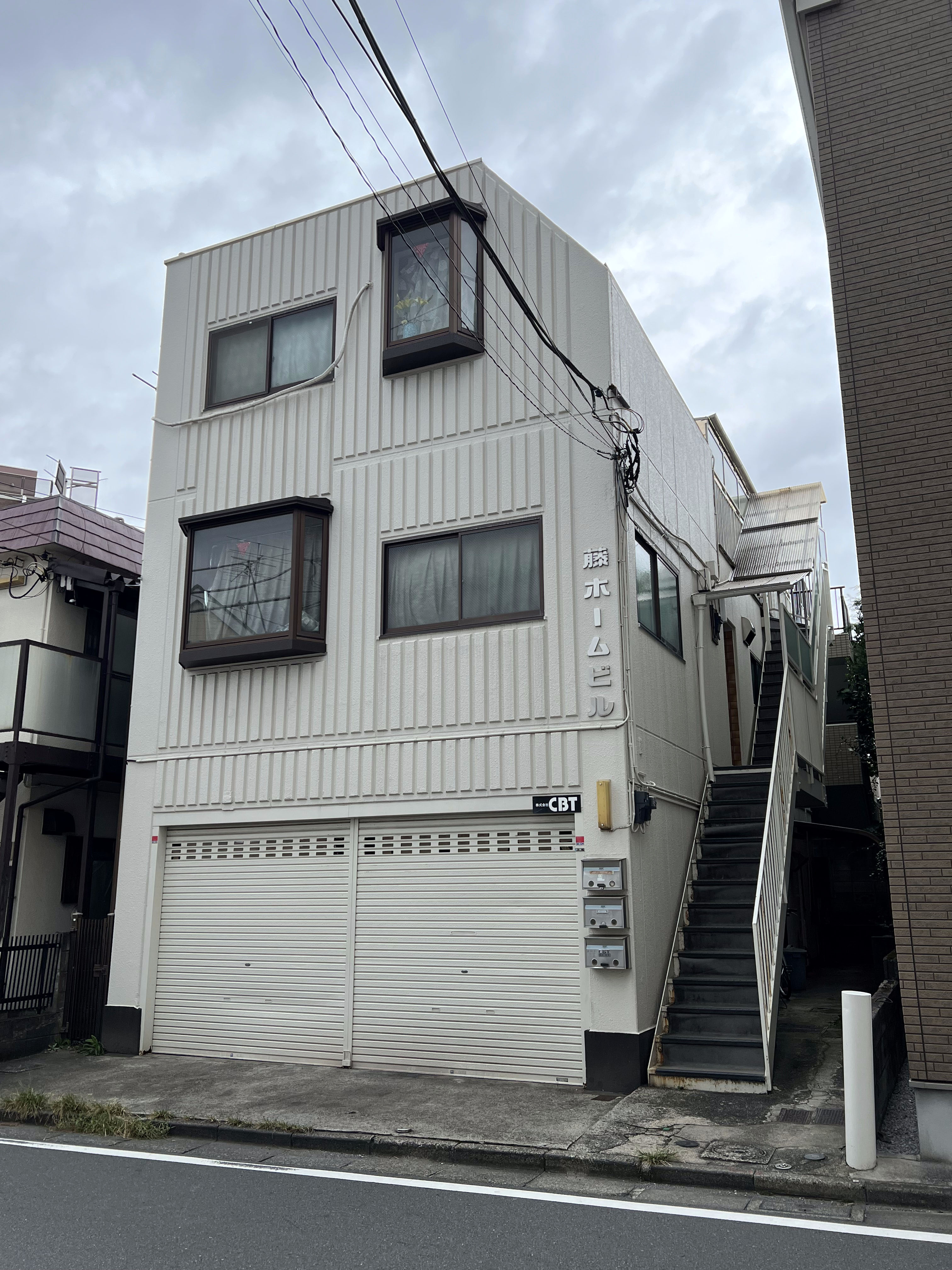
- Native name: 株式会社スタジオぬえ
- Romanized name: Kabushiki gaisha Sutajio Nue
- Type: Private (Kabushiki gaisha)
- Industry: Media and Entertainment
- Founded: 1972
- Founder: Naoyuki Kato; Kenichi Matsuzaki; Kazutaka Miyatake; Haruka Takachiho
- Headquarters: Shimoshakuji, Nerima, Tokyo, Japan
- Products: Animated feature films and Anime series

Studio Nue, Inc. (Japanese: スタジオぬえ) is a Japanese design studio formed in 1972 (as Crystal Art Studio) by Naoyuki Kato, Kenichi Matsuzaki, Kazutaka Miyatake, and Haruka Takachiho. Crystal Art Studio would change their name to Studio Nue in 1974.

They were known as the co-creators of the Macross franchise along with Artland (co-production of the first series) and Big West Advertising (financial funding).

Mechanical designer Shōji Kawamori is a notable member of Studio Nue and is remembered as the key creator of Macross.

The mascot for Studio Nue was based on the Nue yōkai from Japanese mythology. It also acted as a chimera for the personal mascots of the four founders, a vampire bat, cockroach, tanuki, and snake respectively.

== Filmography ==
- Aero Troopers
- Zero Tester
- Chogattai Majutsu Robot Ginguiser
- Chōdenji Robo Combattler V
- Chōdenji Machine Voltes V
- Future GPX Cyber Formula
- Space Battleship Yamato
- Space Battleship Yamato II
- Arcadia of My Youth
- Techno Police 21C
- The Super Dimension Fortress Macross
- Crusher Joe
- Dirty Pair
- Super Dimension Century Orguss
- Macross: Do You Remember Love?
- The Super Dimension Fortress Macross: Flash Back 2012
- Macross Plus
- Macross 7
- Macross Dynamite 7
- Macross Zero
- Macross Frontier
- Armored Core series
- Infinite Space
- Macross Delta
- Uchū Majin Daikengo
- Miru
