= Zentradi =

Fictional aliens in The Marcross franchise

- Macross race
- A "Zentradi" soldier sporting heavy combat armour. The yellow and black Zentradi emblem can be seen in their chest.
- First appearance: The Super Dimension Fortress Macross (1982)

In-universe information
- Home world: Interstellar Republic

The Zentradi (ゼントラーディ人, Zentorādi-jin) are a fictional alien race of militaristic giants. They are antagonists in the Macross franchise and its Robotech adaptation.

It is transliterated as "Zentradi", "Zjentohlauedy", "Zentrady", and "Zentraedi" for the Japanese Macross series, with the "Zentraedi" spelling being the one most used commonly in the English-dubbed Robotech adaptation. The Robotech novels and comics added the occasional spelling "T'sentraeti". In both the Macross and Robotech settings, humans and Zentradi are capable of interbreeding. Physically, most of them also resemble humans with pointy ears, though some have unique skin and hair colors. Prior to their first encounter with the human race, all members of the Zentradi race were artificially created through cloning.

== Conception and development ==
The idea of extraterrestrial humanoid enemies was first conceived by Shōji Kawamori, inspired by the trend of militaristic alien antagonists from previous science fiction shows like Space Battleship Yamato (1974).

After the Studio Nue staff developed the final concept of what would become the Zentradi giant warrior race, artists Kazutaka Miyatake and Kawamori himself were in charge of designing the enemies' alphabet, machines and ships, while Haruhiko Mikimoto developed the Zentradi uniforms and the different alien characters.

== Appearances ==
=== In Macross ===
In the original Macross anime the Zentradi were created as a spacefaring race of giant humanoid proxy warriors by the first advanced humanoid civilization in the galaxy, the humanoid Protoculture, 497,500 years ago. They contributed greatly to the expansion of the Protoculture Civilization's sphere of influence and the creation of an "Interstellar Republic" (akin to a galactic empire) that controlled most of the Milky Way.

As war broke out with The Supervision Army centuries later, the Zentradi entered into combat with their fearsomely powerful force of millions of space warships and mecha produced in thousands of huge automated factories scattered across the galaxy and legions of expendable giant clone troops. After the end of the war with the Supervision Army, the Zentradi fleets travelled the galaxy in search of Supervision Army survivors until they encountered the human race, an event that caused Space War I (2009–2010).

In order to better maintain control of the Zentradi, the Protoculture trained them only in the limited mix of skills which were necessary for the soldier's particular role in the Zentradi military. It seems that no Zentradi were trained in the repair and maintenance of their equipment, making them dependent on easily controlled supply stations and factory asteroids. The Zentradi were also segregated so that males and females could not mix, which might lead to love and/or natural procreation. Male Zentradi are also called "Zentran", which means "male" in the Zentradi language. Also, Female Zentradi are called Meltrandi, the word "Meltran" meaning "female" as well. Finally, the Zentradi were forbidden culture, and were instilled with orders to never interfere with culture-bearing planets and civilizations, again apparently to suppress independent thought and keep an iron loyalty in all the Zentradi forces.

The downfall of the Zentradi nomadic warrior civilization came during Space War I (2009), when the technologically inferior but culturally and spiritually superior "Micronians" (humans) were able to reach the buried emotions of the Zentradi through terrestrial culture and humane actions, especially music and acts of love and kindness.

After 2012, the Zentradi are estimated to have 1000–2000 fleets of sizes similar to the 4.8-million-ship Boddole Zer Main Fleet in Space War I. However, the UN government of allied Humans and Zentradi became the reigning hegemony in near-Earth galactic space.

The average Zentradi are five times the size of Earth Humans, but some of them use ancient miniaturizing cloning technology known as the micronization process (マイクローン化, maikurōn-ka) to coexist with humanity. Many integrated into each other's population where many families became a mix of both Human and Zentradi individuals.

Before the Zentradi and modern Humans made contact, the average Zentradi had the equivalent intelligence of Human primary school children, only needing to be intelligent enough to perform their assigned tasks. Since their exposure to Human society and knowledge, their potential intelligence and learning capacity has been shown to be higher.

In the first Macross TV series it was revealed that Commander Type Zentradi are bigger, stronger and more intelligent than the rest, while some are even able to survive in the vacuum of space for limited amounts of time. This makes it possible for them to endure hand-to-hand combat against human mecha like the VF-1 Valkyrie.

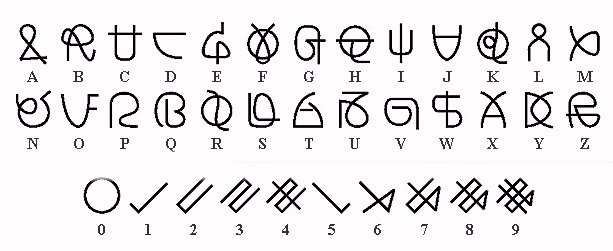
The Zentradi alphabet.

In the original Macross TV series the Zentradi possessed a fictional alien alphabet which was developed by Kazutaka Miyatake of the Studio Nue staff but their dialogue was automatically translated into Japanese language. However, in the Macross: Do You Remember Love? animated film, the Zentradi were actually shown speaking a fictional extraterrestrial language (that also was developed for the movie by the Studio Nue production staff) as subtitles were provided for the audience.

The Zentradi alphabet from the original Macross TV series and the spoken form of the Zentradi language from the Macross: Do You Remember Love? film appeared again in the Macross 7: Encore OVA and the Macross Frontier animated television series. Both the fictional Zentradi language and its alphabet have been used in several video games that take place in the Macross universe.

In Macross 7 (2045), the Zentradi are noted to be especially fearful towards other alien creatures known as the Protodeviln to the point of it being a reflex.

During the third Macross TV series, Macross Frontier (2059), the Zentradi are shown to live among humans in both macronized (giant) and micronized (human sized) form in the outer space colonies. This includes having Zentradi sized buildings and facilities, including shopping malls with similarly sized products. They also seem to change sizes at will using the cloning technology described before. In the new series, some Zentradi-Human hybrids also share the ability to have their hair move on its own according to their feelings, as well as having an above-average resistance to space vacuum.

==== Meltlandi ====
In the Macross setting, Meltlandi or Meltlan is the term for female Zentradi, a giant humanoid alien warrior race segregated by gender.

In the first Macross animated TV series, the female Zentradi collaborated with the male Zentradi in Space War I against the Humans, but the two genders were segregated into separate fleets to prevent direct interaction. The segregated fleets shared the same ship types (with different color schemes), but employed different armor and vehicle complements. Neither the word "Meltlandi" nor any derivative was coined or used in this series.

Macross: Do You Remember Love? reimagined the female Zentradi as their own faction fighting against the male Zentradi for millennia. The movie also introduced the term "Meltlan" as the term for "female" in the Zentradi language (a language created for the movie). The corresponding term in the Zentradi language for "male" is "Zentran". The later series Macross 7, incorporated the term "Meltlan" in its dialogue to refer to female Zentradi. The liner notes for the series explained the term was popularized among Humans by a 2031 movie depicting Space War I.

Probably the best known female Zentradi is Milia Fallyna Jenius, the most renowned Zentradi pilot that the humans have encountered. The spelling and pronunciation of these terms is difficult to interpret, as the Japanese language uses a series of characters that split the difference, phonetically, between the English letters "L" and "R", and thus can be transliterated as either.

=== In Robotech ===
In the American adaptation of the series (Harmony Gold, 1985) the Zentraedi were originally a genetically engineered race of giant clones that served the people of the habitable moon Tirol from their inhospitable mother planet Fantoma. In time, the ruling leaders of Tirol became the Robotech Masters, and the Zentraedi were transformed from miners to soldiers for the Masters' galactic empire.

The traits and behaviors of the Robotech Zentraedi are substantially the same as those of their Macross counterparts. However, although segregation by gender remains a central premise, the word "Zentraedi" refers equally to males and females in Robotech, with no use of the word "Meltrandi" occurring. Additionally, in Robotech continuity, the near-totality of Zentraedi in existence is found between Dolza's Main Fleet of 4.8 million warships destroyed by the SDF-1, the unified forces of Breetai and Azonia that fight alongside the SDF-1, and one additional substantive fleet led by Commander Reno and tasked with protecting the Robotech Factory Satellite. With the defeat of both Dolza and Reno, and enormous losses suffered by the allied forces in the course of their campaigns, very few of a race that once numbered into billions are known to remain alive by the end of Robotech's Macross Saga—a significant difference from the Macross continuity, where thousands of fleets on par with Dolza's said to exist.

== Reception ==
In Anime Classics Zettai! Brian Clamp and Julie Davis describe the Zentradi as "a parody of tendencies in human civilisation" and compare them to the Laputans from Gulliver's Travels.
