= Megumi Nakajima discography =

The following is a discography for Megumi Nakajima.

== Albums ==
- I Love You [2010.06.09]
- Be with You [2012.03.07]
- Thank You [2014.02.26]
- Curiosity [2018.02.14]
- Lovely train
- Green diary [2021.02.03]

== Singles ==
=== Seikan Hikō ===
"Seikan Hikō" was the first single from Megumi Nakajima as Ranka Lee's character, and the debut song of Ranka in the series; contains two cover of Lynn Minmay (Mari Iijima); Ai Oboete Imasu ka (reproduced in deculture edition chapter and 12 of the series as ending teme and 18 as insert song) and Watashi no Kare wa Pilot (insert song chapter 4 Miss Macross), also contains own songs of Megumi = Ranka as Neko Nikki (insert song in chapters 9 and 12, and fifth ending theme in chapter 11). This single debuted at number 5 on Oricon Dailies

Track listing

No.	Title	Lyrics	Music	Arrangement	Length
1.	"Seikan Hikō (星間飛行) [Interstellar Flight]"	Takashi Matsumoto	Yoko Kanno	Yoko Kanno	3:54
2.	"Neko Nikki (ねこ日記) [Cat Diary]"	Hiroshi Ichikura	Yoko Kanno	Yoko Kanno	4:20
3.	"Ai Oboete Imasu ka (Deculture Edition size) (愛・おぼえていますか (デカルチャーエディションsize)) [Do You Remember Love? (Deculture Edition size)]"	Kazumi Yasui	Kazuhiko Katō	Yoko Kanno	2:41
4.	"Watashi no Kare wa Pilot -MISS MACROSS 2059- (私の彼はパイロット) [My Boyfriend is a Pilot]"	Akane Asa	Kentarō Haneda	Yoko Kanno, Hisaaki Hokari	1:56
5.	"Seikan Hikō (without Ranka)"		Yoko Kanno	Yoko Kanno	3:53
6.	"Ai Oboete Imasu ka (Deculture Edition size without Ranka)"		Kazuhiko Katō	Yoko Kanno	2:39
Total length:					19:23

=== Lion ===
"Lion" was the second single from Megumi Nakajima as Ranka Lee also possesses the songs: Lion who plays with May'n (third opening of the series, chapters 18 to 24) and Northern Cross was the seventh song to appear as the ending theme and the second most predominant (Chapters 16, 17, 18, 22, 23 and 24)

Track listing

All music is composed by Yoko Kanno.

No.	Title	Lyrics	Vocals	Length
1.	"Lion (ライオン)"	Gabriela Robin	May'n & Megumi Nakajima	5:06
2.	"Northern Cross (ノーザンクロス)"	Yūho Iwasato, Gabriela Robin	May'n	5:18
3.	"Lion (without vocal)"			5:06
4.	"Northern Cross (without vocal)"			5:12
Total length:				20:42

=== Ranka to Bobby no SMS Shōtai no Uta Nado. ===
"Ranka to Bobby no SMS Shōtai no Uta Nado" is the third single from Megumi Nakajima as Ranka, was released after the conclusion of the Macross Frontier TV series, and features the participation of Kenta Miyake = Bobby Margot, and performs a cover of the songs SMS Shōtai no Uta in duet (sung by several voice actors in the anime), and a cover of Watashi no Kare wa Pilot performed by Bobby (originally performed by Mari Iijima). Arrangements: track1=Yoko Kanno, track2=Yoko Kanno, Hisaaki Hokari

No.	Title	Lyrics	Music	Vocals	Length
1.	"Ranka to Bobby no SMS Shōtai no Uta (ランカとボビーのSMS小隊の歌) [Ranka and Bobby's SMS Platoon Theme]"	Eiji Kurokawa	Yoko Kanno	Megumi Nakajima=Ranka Lee & Kenta Miyake=Bobby Margot	1:01
2.	"Bobby no Watashi no Kare wa Pilot ~ Mōsō no Kare mo Pilot (ボビーの私の彼はパイロット~妄想の彼もパイロット) [Bobby's My Boyfriend is a Pilot ~ The Delusional Guy is Also a Pilot]"	Akane Asa	Kentarō Haneda	Kenta Miyake=Bobby Margot	2:38
3.	"Ranka to Bobby no SMS Shōtai no Uta (Karaoke)"		Yoko Kanno		1:01
4.	"Bobby no Watashi no Kare wa Pilot ~ Mōsō no Kare mo Pilot (Karaoke)"		Kentarō Haneda		2:32
Total length:					7:12

=== Tenshi ni Naritai ===
Tenshi ni Naritai (天使 に なりたい) is her fourth single, but was the first launched by Nakajima Megumi who was not represented by an anime character; prior to its release, released as digital download songs Tenshi ni Naritai, Pine and Be Myself in Japan mora stores. Tenshi ni Naritai as was the most "requested", this was chosen as the A-side of the CD, the others spent the B-side. When it published the single also included a new song "(Kari) Dajaren no Outa". This single debuted at number 12 on Oricon Dailies.

No.	Title	Lyrics	Music	Arrangement	Length
1.	"Tenshi ni Naritai (天使になりたい) [I Wanna Be an Angel]"	Haruyuki	Shigenaga Ryōsuke	Ryo	4:28
2.	"Be Myself"	Haruyuki	Fujisawa Yoshimasa	Fujisawa Yoshimasa	4:50
3.	"Pine (パイン)"	Haruyuki	Haruyuki	Keita Kawaguchi	4:17
4.	"(Kari) Dajare no O-uta ((仮)ダジャレのお歌) [(Temporary) Dajare's Song]"	MaluMalu	Hideo Akari, Minoriko Okamoto	Koji Miyashita	4:54
Total length:					18:29

=== Nostalgia ===
Nostalgia was her second single as Nakajima Megumi and the fifth of her career, this included two original songs of Mamegu (Nostalgia and Shining on), and a Mari Iijima's cover of the song Tenshi no Enogu, who was chosen by the fans (with 1,058 votes) in February 2009, in a special site showed up on the Macross Frontier official website which featured a poll for Macross, which song do you want covered by Ranka Lee?, which had other songs, such as My Friends (second with 721 votes), Totsugeki Love Heart (突撃ラブハート) (in third place with 508 votes), Voices (in fourth place with 431 votes) and Shao Pai Long (小白竜) [Little White Dragon] in last place with 355 votes. Nostalgia and Tenshi ni Naritai singles was used as the theme song for the 2008 adaption of the drama Daisuki! Itsutsugo. Following the launch of the single, this was accompanied by a DVD containing two tracks, 1.Making and 2.Tenshi ni Naritai (天使 に なりたい) [I Wanna Be an Angel] (PV). This single debuted at # 10 on Oricon Dailies.

No.	Title	Lyrics	Music	Arrangement	Length
1.	"Nostalgia (ノスタルジア)"	Haruyuki	Shigenaga Ryōsuke	Keita Kawaguchi	4:20
2.	"Shining on"	Kato Kanako	Shigenaga Ryōsuke	Koji Miyashita	4:54
3.	"Tenshi no Enogu (天使の絵の具) [Paint of Angels]"	Mari Iijima	Mari Iijima	Yasushi Sakurai	4:03
4.	"Nostalgia (Piano Ver.)"		Shigenaga Ryōsuke	Ippei Haino	5:31
5.	"Nostalgia (Instrumental)"		Shigenaga Ryōsuke	Keita Kawaguchi	4:17
Total length:					23:05

=== No Limit ===
"No Limit" was the first single from the group Eclipse of the Basquash! series integrating by: Rouge (Haruka Tomatsu), Violette (Saori Hayami) and Citron (Nakajima Megumi) as the leader. And the sixth single from Megumi; nO limiT was used as the opening theme (episodes 2 to 13 and 22 as the insert song), and moon pasport was used as insert song in the same anime. Arrangements: track1=Yoshihiro Kusano, track2=Funta7

No.	Title	Lyrics	Music	Vocals	Length
1.	"No Limit"	Miki Fujisue	Miki Fujisue	Megumi Nakajima with Haruka Tomatsu and Saori Hayami	4:30
2.	"moon passport"	Funta7, KK	Funta3	Megumi Nakajima with Haruka Tomatsu and Saori Hayami	4:19
3.	"nO limiT (off vocal)"		Miki Fujisue		4:30
4.	"moon passport (off vocal)"		Funta3		4:17
Total length:					17:36

=== Running on ===
Running on is the seventh single from Megumi and second of the group Eclipse of the Basquash! series, it contains the songs Running on (which was used as insert song), and also features solo versions of their debut single, "No Limit". This solo versions sparked many disputes between the followers of the voice actors, by reason of who was the best singer, but not step over. Arrangements: track1= Okumoto Akira, track2=Yoshihiro Kusano

No.	Title	Lyrics	Music	Vocals	Length
1.	"Running on"	Miura Seiji	Miki Fujisue	Megumi Nakajima with Haruka Tomatsu and Saori Hayami	4:42
2.	"No Limit Rouge starring Haruka Tomatsu (No Limit Rouge starring 戸松遥)"	Miki Fujisue	Miki Fujisue	Haruka Tomatsu	4:30
3.	"No Limit Citron starring Nakajima Megumi (nO limiT Citron starring 中島愛)"	Miki Fujisue	Miki Fujisue	Nakajima Megumi	4:30
4.	"No Limit Violette starring Saori Hayami (nO limiT Violette starring 早見沙織)"	Miki Fujisue	Miki Fujisue	Saori Hayami	4:30
5.	"Running on (off vocal version)"		Miki Fujisue		4:41
Total length:					22:53

=== Futari no Yakusoku ===
"Futari no Yakusoku" (二人の約束) (Our Promise) was the last single released by Eclipse, and the eighth of Nakajima, presents the songs Futari no Yakusoku that was used as the ending theme (chapters 13 to 23 and 25-26), and the song Hoshi Watari performed only by Mamegu (Citron), and this was used as ending theme in chapter 24, when Dan and his friends travel to the Moon by the power of the ruins of the legend with this song. Arrangements: track1=Yoshihiro Kusano, track2=Conisch

No.	Title	Lyrics	Music	Vocals	Length
1.	"Futari no Yakusoku (二人の約束) [Our Promise]"	Megumi Sena	Miki Fujisue	Megumi Nakajima with Haruka Tomatsu and Saori Hayami	5:01
2.	"Hoshi Watari (ホシワタリ) [Stars Ferry]"	Megumi Sena	Miki Fujisue	Citron starring Nakajima Megumi	4:53
3.	"Futari no Yakusoku (off vocal)"		Miki Fujisue		5:01
4.	"Hoshi Watari (off vocal)"		Miki Fujisue		4:49
Total length:					19:44

=== One Way Ryō Omoi ===
"One Way Ryō Omoi" (ワン ウェイ 両 想い) (One Way Love) is the second single of the series Kämpfer, but the ninth of Megumi, involved in this CD Marina Inoue (as Seno Natsuru) and Megumi Nakajima (as Sakura Kaede), the song One Ryō Omoi Way is used as the ending theme of the series, the second track is Tatakae Mora Rhythm and the third track One Way Ryō Omoi -unstoppable delusion ≒ impulse-, is a remix arranged by Yoshihisa xxyoshixx Fujita. Arrangements: track1=Takahiro Ando, track2=Akira Takada

No.	Title	Lyrics	Music	Vocals	Length
1.	"One Way Ryō Omoi (ワンウェイ両想い) [One Way Love]"	Saori Kodama	Tashiro Tomokazu	Megumi Nakajima=Sakura Kaede & Marina Inoue=Seno Natsuru	3:43
2.	"Tatakae Mora Rhythm (タタカエ☆モラリズム) [Fight! Mora Rhythm]"	Saori Kodama	Tashiro Tomokazu	Megumi Nakajima=Sakura Kaede & Marina Inoue=Seno Natsuru	4:05
3.	"One Way Ryō Omoi -unstoppable delusion ≒ impulse- (ワンウェイ両想い -unstoppable delusion ≒ impulse-)"			Megumi Nakajima=Sakura Kaede & Marina Inoue=Seno Natsuru	7:23
4.	"One Way Ryō Omoi (instrumental)"		Tashiro Tomokazu		3:40
Total length:					18:51

=== Jellyfish no Kokuhaku ===
"Jellyfish no Kokuhaku" (ジェリーフィッシュ の 告白) (Confession of a Jellyfish) is the third single from Megumi Nakajima who is not represented by an anime character, and tenth in her career; presents the songs Jellyfish no Kokuhaku used as ending theme in the Kobato series and Hi no Ataru Heya. This single debuted at number 12 on Oricon Dailies.

No.	Title	Lyrics	Music	Arrangement	Length
1.	"Jellyfish no Kokuhaku (ジェリーフィッシュの告白) [Confession of a Jellyfish]"	Yuho Iwasato	Dan Miyakawa	Dan Miyakawa	4:13
2.	"Hi no Ataru Heya (陽のあたるへや) [Room Facing the Sun]"	Dan Miyakawa	Dan Miyakawa	Dan Miyakawa	4:57
3.	"Jellyfish no Kokuhaku (w/o megumi)"		Dan Miyakawa	Dan Miyakawa	4:13
4.	"Hi no Ataru Heya (w/o megumi)"		Dan Miyakawa	Dan Miyakawa	4:53
Total length:					18:16

=== CM Ranka ===
"CM Ranka" (CM ランカ) is the fourth single from Megumi Nakajima as Ranka Lee, but eleven of her career, this single contains songs sung by Megumi in the movie Gekijōban Macross Frontier: Itsuwari no Utahime, the song Sō Da Yo was used as ending theme of the movie, from second to seventh track are songs of commercials sung by Ranka in the movie, except Ninjin loves you yeah! The eighth track on the CD was confirmed on the official website of Flying Dog. This CD contains two songs written by Shōji Kawamori himself, under the alias of Eiji Kurokawa (黒河影次). The song "Family Mart Cosmos" is used in Family Mart convenience stores in addition to the film. This single debuted at number 5 on Oricon Dailies

Track listing

All music is composed by Yoko Kanno.

No.	Title	Lyrics	Length
1.	"Sō Da Yo. (そうだよ。) [It Is So.]"	Maaya Sakamoto / Gabriela Robin	4:01
2.	"Starlight Nattō (スターライト納豆) [Starlight Fermented Soybeans]"	Hiroshi Ichikura	1:49
3.	"Dynam Chōgōkin (ダイナム超合金) [Dynam Toy Brand]"	Eiji Kurokawa	1:32
4.	"Kaitaku Jūki (開拓重機) [Reclamation Heavy Machinery]"	Hiroshi Ichikura	1:19
5.	"Daruma Seminar (だるまゼミナール) [Daruma Doll Seminar]"	Hiroshi Ichikura	0:42
6.	"Ninjin loves you yeah! (ニンジーン loves you yeah!) [Carrots loves you yeah!]"	Hiroshi Ichikura	1:03
7.	"Family Mart Cosmos (ファミリーマート・コスモス)"	Hiroshi Ichikura	1:41
8.	"Koi no Dogfight (Chotto Dake) (恋のドッグファイト（ちょっとだけ）) [Love's Dog Fight (Just a Little Bit)]"	Eiji Kurokawa	1:03
Total length:			13:10

=== Melody ===
"Melody" (メロディ) is the fourth single from Megumi Nakajima who is not represented by an anime character, and the twelfth in her career; presents the song Melody used as ending theme to first volume of OVA Tamayura series, and the songs Natsudori used as second ending theme and Naisho no Hanashi used as insert song.

No.	Title	Lyrics	Music	Arrangement	Length
1.	"Melody (メロディ)"	Katsutoshi Kitagawa	Katsutoshi Kitagawa	Katsutoshi Kitagawa
2.	"Natsudori (夏鳥) [Summer Bird]"	Sugimori Mai	Sugimori Mai	Nobuyuki Shimizu
3.	"Naisho no Hanashi (ナイショのはなし) [Secret Conversation]"	Nakajima Megumi / Nishi Naoki	Mina Kubota	Mina Kubota
4.	"Melody -without megumi-"		Katsutoshi Kitagawa	Katsutoshi Kitagawa
5.	"Natsudori -without megumi-"		Sugimori Mai	Nobuyuki Shimizu
6.	"Naisho no Hanashi -without megumi-"		Mina Kubota	Mina Kubota

=== Hōkago Overflow ===
"Hōkago Overflow" (放課後オーバーフロウ) is the second single release from Ranka Lee of anime series "Macross Frontier." Includes B-side "Get it on-flying rock" sung with Sheryl, Hōkago Overflow is the second official single of Ranka after Seikan Hikō, this song has been used for promotion the new film Gekijōban Macross F: Sayonara no Tsubasa.

Track listing

All music is composed by Yoko Kanno.

No.	Title	Lyrics	Vocals	Length
1.	"Hōkago Overflow (放課後オーバーフロウ) [After-school Overflow]"	Gabriela Robin	Ranka Lee = Megumi Nakajima
2.	"Get it on – flying rock"	Tim Jensen, Gabriela Robin	Ranka Lee = Megumi Nakajima / Sheryl Nome starring May'n
3.	"Hōkago Overflow (w/o ranka lee)"
4.	"Get it on – flying rock (w/o sheryl nome & ranka lee)"

Track listing

All music is composed by Yoko Kanno.

No.	Title	Lyrics	Vocals	Length
1.	"After-school Overflow"	Gabriela Robin	Ranka Lee = Megumi Nakajima
2.	"Get it on – flying rock"	Tim Jensen, Gabriela Robin	Ranka Lee = Megumi Nakajima / Sheryl Nome starring May'n
3.	"Hōkago Overflow (w/o ranka lee)"
4.	"Get it on – flying rock (w/o sheryl nome & ranka lee)"

=== Digital downloads ===
- Be Myself (2008.11.08)
- Pine (パイン) (2008.11.08)
- Tenshi ni Naritai (天使になりたい) [I Wanna Be an Angel] (2008.11.08)
- Tenshi ni Naritai Live ver. (天使になりたい) [I Wanna Be an Angel] (2009.07.01)
- Shining on Live ver. (2009.07.01)
- Raspberry Kiss (2009.07.08)

== Compilations ==
=== Macross Frontier O.S.T.1 Nyan FRO. ===
  - What 'bout my star?@Formo (duet with May'n)
  - Aimo (アイモ)
  - Ninjiin Loves you yeah! (ニンジーン Loves you yeah!) [Carrots Loves you yeah!]
  - "Chō Jikū Hanten Nyan Nyan" CM Song (Ranka Version) (「超時空飯店 娘々」CMソング(Ranka Version)) ["Super Dimension Restaurant Nyan Nyan" CM Song (Ranka Version)]
  - Aimo ~Tori no Hito (アイモ～鳥のひと) [Aimo ~ Bird Human]

=== Macross Frontier O.S.T.2 Nyan TRA☆ ===
  - Triangler (fight on stage) (トライアングラー (fight on stage)) (duet with May'n)
  - Anata no Oto (アナタノオト) [Your Sound]
  - Seikan Hikō (星間飛行) [Interstellar Flight]
  - Ai Oboete Imasu ka ~ bless the little queen (愛・おぼえていますか～bless the little queen) [Do You Remember Love? ~ bless the little queen]
  - Ao no Ether (蒼のエーテル) [Azure Ether]
  - Aimo O.C. (アイモ O.C.)
  - Nyan Nyan Service Medley (娘々サービスメドレー) (with May'n and Maaya Sakamoto)

=== Macross Frontier Vocal Collection Nyan Tama ===
- Disc 1
  - What 'bout my star?@Formo (duet with May'n)
  - Aimo (アイモ)
  - Diamond Crevasse ~ Tenbō Kōen Nite (ダイアモンド クレバス～展望公園にて) [Diamond Crevasse ~ In the Park View] (duet with May'n)
  - Infinity #7 (インフィニティ #7) (duet with May'n)
  - "Chō Jikū Hanten Nyan Nyan" CM Song (Ranka Version) (「超時空飯店 娘々」CMソング(Ranka Version)) ["Super Dimension Restaurant Nyan Nyan" CM Song (Ranka Version)]
  - Seikan Hikō (星間飛行) [Interstellar Flight]
  - Watashi no Kare wa Pilot (私の彼はパイロット) [My Boyfriend is a Pilot]
  - Neko Nikki (ねこ日記) [Cat Diary]
  - Ninjiin Loves you yeah! (ニンジーン Loves you yeah!) [Carrots Loves you yeah!]
  - Aimo O.C (アイモ O.C.)
  - Aimo ~ Tori no Hito (アイモ～鳥のひと) [Aimo ~ Bird Human]
  - Ai Oboete Imasu ka (愛・おぼえていますか) [Do You Remember Love?]
- Disc 2
  - Lion (ライオン) (duet with May'n)
  - Diamond Crevasse 50/50 (ダイアモンド クレバス 50/50) (duet with May'n)
  - Brera to Ko-Ranka no Aimo (ブレラと子ランカのアイモ) [Brera and Little Ranka's Aimo]
  - Anata no Oto (アナタノオト) [Your Sound]
  - Ao no Ether (蒼のエーテル) [Azure Ether]
  - Ai Oboete Imasu ka ~ bless the little queen (愛・おぼえていますか ～bless the little queen) [Do You Remember Love? ~ bless the little queen]
  - Nyan Nyan Special Service Medley (Tokumori) (娘々スペシャルサービスメドレー (特盛り)) [Nyan Nyan Special Service Medley (Special Serving)] (with May'n and Maaya Sakamoto)
  - Triangler (fight on stage) (トライアングラー (fight on stage)) (duet with May'n)
  - Haha to Ko-Ranka no Aimo (母と子ランカのアイモ) [Mother and Little Ranka's Aimo] (duet with Maaya Sakamoto)

=== Idol Attack! ===
  - Niji no Brace (虹のBRACE) [Rainbow's Brace] (with Haruka Tomatsu / Saori Hayami)
  - Cosmos
  - After the Heart Rain
  - No Limit (album-mix) (with Haruka Tomatsu / Saori Hayami)
  - No Limit (sadness x Rouge edit) (with Haruka Tomatsu / Saori Hayami)

=== Iki o Shiteru Kanjiteiru ===
  - Iki o Shiteru Kanjiteiru (息をしてる 感じている) [I'm Breathing, I'm Feeling] (with Mari Iijima, Fire Bomber and May'n)
  - Iki o Shiteru Kanjiteiru (TV Mix)

=== Kämpfer Character Song Album ===
  - Sugao de Fall in Love (素顔でフォーリンラブ) [A Make-up Fall in Love]
  - Sugao de Fall in Love (Instrumental)
