= Diamond Crevasse / Iteza Gogo Kuji Don't be late =

"Diamond Crevasse/Iteza Gogo Kuji Don't be late"

Single by Sheryl Nome starring May'n
- Released: May 7, 2008
- Genre: J-Pop
- Length: 23:23
- Label: Victor Entertainment
- Songwriter(s): Yoko Kanno, Dai Satō, hal, Maiku Sugiyama, Gabriela Robin
- Producer(s): Yoko Kanno

Sheryl Nome starring May'n singles chronology
"Fallin' in or Not" (2006)	"Diamond Crevasse/Iteza Gogo Kuji Don't be late" (2008)	"Lion" (2008)

"Diamond Crevasse / Iteza☆Gogo Kuji Don't be late (ダイアモンド クレバス / 射手座☆午後九時Don't be late)" is Nakabayashi May's fourth official single, released under stage name Sheryl Nome starring May'n. "Diamond Crevasse" was used as the second ending theme and "Iteza☆Gogo Kuji Don't be late" was used as an insert song for popular mecha anime Macross Frontier.

== Single track listing ==
CD (VTCL-35025)
No.	Title	Lyrics	Music	Length
1.	"Diamond Crevasse (ダイアモンド クレバス)" (Macross Frontier 1st ending theme)	hal	Yoko Kanno	5:57
2.	"Iteza☆Gogo Kuji Don't be late (射手座☆午後九時Don't be late, Sagittarius☆9PM Don't be late)" (Macross Frontier insert song)	Dai Satō, hal, Maiku Sugiyama, Gabriela Robin.	Yoko Kanno	5:46
3.	"Diamond Crevasse (without Sheryl)" (Instrumental)		Yoko Kanno	5:57
4.	"Iteza☆Gogo Kuji Don't be late (without Sheryl)" (Instrumental)		Yoko Kanno	5:44
Total length:				23:23

== Charts ==
Chart	Peak position	Sales	Time in chart
Oricon Weekly Singles	#3	108,504	27 weeks
