= Ai Oboete Imasu ka =

Single by Mari Iijima

from the album Macross: Do You Remember Love? ― Original Soundtrack
- Language: Japanese
- English title: Do You Remember Love?
- B-side: "Tenshi no Enogu"
- Released: June 5, 1984; September 22, 1993 (CD)
- Recorded: 1984
- Genre: J-pop; kayōkyoku; anison
- Length: 5:11
- Label: Victor
- Songwriters: Kazumi Yasui; Kazuhiko Katō

Mari Iijima singles chronology
"Kitto Ieru" (1983)	"Ai Oboete Imasu ka" (1984)	"1 Gram no Shiawase" (1984)

Alternative cover
- Macross: Do You Remember Love? single cover

Music videos
- "Ai Oboete Imasu ka" on YouTube
- "Tenshi no Enogu" on YouTube

"Ai Oboete Imasu ka" (愛・おぼえていますか; lit. "Do You Remember Love?") is the third single by Japanese singer-songwriter Mari Iijima, released on June 5, 1984, by Victor Entertainment. Written by Kazumi Yasui and Kazuhiko Katō, it was used as the theme song of the 1984 mecha anime film Macross: Do You Remember Love?, which also featured Iijima as the voice of Lynn Minmay. The B-side is "Tenshi no Enogu" (天使の絵の具; lit. "An Angel's Paints"), which was written by Iijima and used as the film's ending theme.

The single peaked at No. 7 on the Oricon Singles Chart and landed at No. 38 on Oricon's 1984 year-ending chart while selling over 270,000 copies, making it Iijima's best-selling single.

"Ai Oboete Imasu ka" won the Animage 1984 Anime Grand Prix in the song category and the Theme Song Award at the 2nd Japan Anime Grand Prix. The song also ranked No. 1 on NHK's All Macross Poll (全マクロス大投票, Zen Makurosu Dai Tōhyō) in 2019.

Iijima re-recorded both "Ai Oboete Imasu ka" and "Tenshi no Enogu" in her 2002 self-cover album Mari Iijima Sings Lynn Minmay to commemorate the 20th anniversary of the Macross franchise.

== Track listing ==
All music is arranged by Nobuyuki Shimizu.

7-inch vinyl

No.	Title	Lyrics	Music	Length
1.	"Ai Oboete Imasu ka" ((愛・おぼえていますか; "Do You Remember Love?"))	Kazumi Yasui	Kazuhiko Katō	5:11
2.	"Tenshi no Enogu" ((天使の絵の具; "An Angel's Paints"))	Mari Iijima	Iijima	4:47

Mini-CD bonus tracks

No.	Title	Length
3.	"Ai Oboete Imasu ka (Original Karaoke)" ((愛・おぼえていますか（オリジナル・カラオケ）; "Do You Remember Love? (Original Karaoke)"))	5:14
4.	"Tenshi no Enogu (Original Karaoke)" ((天使の絵の具 （オリジナル・カラオケ）; "An Angel's Paints (Original Karaoke)"))	4:48

== Charts ==
Chart (1984)	Peak position
Japanese Oricon Singles Chart	7

== Cover versions ==
Ai Oboete Imasu ka

- Priscilla Chan covered the song in Cantonese as "Zhēnqíng liúlù" (真情流露, "True Feelings") on her 1989 album Yǒngyuǎn shì nǐ de péngyǒu (永遠是你的朋友, Forever Your Friend).
- Tommy Arai Project covered the song on their 1991 album House Animation.
- Tomo Sakurai covered the song as Mylene Flare Jenius on the 1995 Macross 7 soundtrack album Mylene Jenius Sings Lynn Minmay and the 1997 soundtrack album Macross Generation: Legend of Eternal Songs. In addition, she recorded a duet with Yukari Tamura on the 1997 drama CD Macross Generation.
- Yuka Imai covered the song as an insert song for the 1996 manga Macross 7: Trash.
- Yoko Ishida covered the song on her 2001 album Ultra Anime Eurobeat Series Bishojo MAX.
- Ikurō Fujiwara recorded a piano cover of the song on his 2002 album Eternal Love Animation Hialing Music.
- Yoko Ueno covered the song on the 2002 various artists album Macross: The Tribute.
- Mikuni Shimokawa covered the song on her 2003 anime cover album Review.
- Jessy covered the song on her 2005 album Jessy's Wonderland.
- Dolce de Musica recorded a classical cover of the song on their 2006 self-titled album.
- MERDOG covered the song on the 2006 various artists album Trance Heaven Presents Anitra Heaven.
- MUH~ covered the song on their 2006 album Vitamin MUH~.
- Tokyo Brass Style recorded a jazz cover of the song on their 2006 album Feast Rafflesia -Ani Jazz 2nd note-.
- I.B.I.S. feat. Seira Sakurai covered the song on their 2007 album Anime Trance 3 and the 2008 album Anime Dance ~ Anison Hit Suite.
- Asami Imai covered the song on the 2007 compilation album The Idolm@ster Radio Top x Top.
- Yumi Matsuzawa covered the song on her 2007 a cappella album Anicappella.
- Show-Ska covered the song on their 2007 album Skanimation Z.
- Maki covered the song on the 2008 various artists album Exit Trance Presents R25 Speed Anime Trance Best.
- Mizuka covered the song on her 2008 cover album Cover Girl.
- Haruko Momoi covered the song on her 2008 cover album More&More Quality RED ~ Anime Song Cover ~.
- Megumi Nakajima covered the song as Ranka Lee as the B-side of her 2008 single "Seikan Hikō". She also recorded an alternate version titled "Ai Oboete Imasu ka ~ Bless the Little Queen" on the 2008 Macross Frontier soundtrack album Macross Frontier O.S.T.2 Nyan TRA☆.
- Masahiro Sayama covered the song in piano on his 2008 album Anipiano.
- anporin covered the song on the 2009 album Anime House Project ~ Kagami Selection Vol. 2 ~.
- Miyuki Nakano covered the song on the 2009 compilation album Speed Anime M@ster -Anison Maaster-.
- m.o.v.e. covered the song on their 2009 cover album anim.o.v.e 01.
- Ne-Ho covered the song on their 2009 album The Best of Cover Ne-Ho.
- Romi covered the song on her 2009 cover album Ano Uta 2.
- Suzume covered the song on the 2009 album Super Anime Remix Vol. 2.
- Chika Anzai covered the song on her 2010 album Super J-Euro Best Mix.
- Rasmus Faber recorded a jazz cover of the song on his 2010 album Rasmus Faber presents Platina Jazz ~ Anime Standards Vol. 2 ~.
- Keiko Mameda covered the song on the 2011 various artists album Butterfly Effect 3 Sorae.
- Kanon Nakagawa starring Nao Tōyama covered the song on the 2011 soundtrack album The World God Only Knows: Character Cover Album ~ Selected by Tamiki Wakaki.
- W.C.D.A. recorded a house music cover of the song on their 2011 single "Ai Oboete Imasu ka (House Mix)".
- Animetal USA covered the song in English on their 2012 album Animetal USA W.
- Elisa covered the song on her 2012 compilation album Rainbow Pulsation ~ The Best of Elisa ~.
- Namida-bashi Gakuen Joshi Cover-bu covered the song on their 2012 album P!! Anison Cover 'Ppoido Non-Stop Mix.
- Riyoko feat. Silent Jazz Case covered the song on her 2012 album Cure Jazz.
- Sasa Handa covered the song on her 2013 album We Love Goya.
- Junko Iwao covered the song on her 2013 cover album Anison A to Z.
- Screens covered the song on their 2014 album Movie Girl.
- Walküre (Minori Suzuki, JUNNA, Kiyono Yasuno, Nozomi Nishida, Nao Toyama) covered the song on the 2016 Macross Delta soundtrack Walküre Trap!.
- M.O.E. covered the song on the 2017 album Kimi to Issho nara Melody mo Yūki ni Naru CD.

Tenshi no Enogu

- Tomo Sakurai covered the song on the 1997 Macross 7 soundtrack album Macross Generation Legend of Eternal Songs.
- Jessy covered the song on her 2005 album Jessy's Wonderland.
- Megumi Nakajima covered the song as the B-side of her 2009 single "Nostalgia".
- Kaseki Cider covered the song on their 2013 album Kaseki Cider's Anisong! Vacation!
- Eriko Nakamura covered the song as Haruka Amami on the 2015 soundtrack album The IdolM@ster Artist 3 01: Haruka Amami.

== See also ==
- 1984 in Japanese music
