= List of Macross Frontier albums =

This article lists the albums attributed to the series Macross Frontier. The entire scores of the series were composed by Yoko Kanno. Two Japanese pop singers, May'n and Megumi Nakajima under stagenames Sheryl Nome starring May'n and Ranka Lee = Megumi Nakajima, have lent their voices to the songs of two fictional songstresses Sheryl Nome and Ranka Lee. Singer and voice actress Maaya Sakamoto also make an appearance as Ranshe Mei, Ranka's mother. Macross Frontier music has received a big success in Japan with all albums and singles making the Oricon weekly charts top 3, in total, Macross Frontier music has sold more than 900,000 copies in Japan.

== Albums ==
=== O.S.T.1 Nyan FRO. ===
Macross Frontier O.S.T.1 Nyan FRO.

Soundtrack album by Yoko Kanno, Maaya Sakamoto, Sheryl Nome starring May'n and Ranka Lee = Megumi Nakajima
- Released: June 4, 2008
- Genre: Anime soundtrack
- Length: 76:37
- Label: Victor Entertainment

Macross Frontier O.S.T.1 Nyan FRO. (マクロスF O.S.T.1 娘フロ。, Makurosu Furontia O.S.T.1 Nyan Furo.; Macross Frontier O.S.T.1 Girls FRO.) is the first soundtrack album of Macross Frontier. The album features opening, ending themes and insert songs from the first half of the series.

Track listing

All music is composed by Yoko Kanno.

Catalog Number: VTCL-60060
| No. | Title | Vocals | Length |
|---|---|---|---|
| 1. | "Frontier 2059" | | 3:01 |
| 2. | "Welcome To My FanClub's Night! (Sheryl On Stage)" | Sheryl Nome starring May'n | 3:45 |
| 3. | "What 'bout my star? (Sheryl On Stage)" | Sheryl Nome starring May'n | 5:02 |
| 4. | "Iteza☆Gogo Kuji Don't be late (Sheryl On Stage) (射手座☆午後九時Don't be late; Sagittarius☆9pm Don't be late!)" | Sheryl Nome starring May'n | 6:02 |
| 5. | "Vital Force" | | 2:47 |
| 6. | "Triangler (トライアングラー, Toraiangurā)" | Maaya Sakamoto | 4:38 |
| 7. | "Zero Hour" | | 3:05 |
| 8. | "What 'bout my star?@Formo" | Sheryl Nome starring May'n & Ranka Lee = Megumi Nakajima | 4:47 |
| 9. | "Innocent green" | | 2:48 |
| 10. | "Aimo (アイモ)" | Ranka Lee = Megumi Nakajima | 1:33 |
| 11. | "Big Boys (ビッグ・ボーイズ, Biggu Bōizu)" | | 1:19 |
| 12. | "Private Army" | | 2:31 |
| 13. | "SMS Shōtai no Uta ~ Ano Ko wa Alien (SMS小隊の歌～あの娘はエイリアン, Shōtai no Uta ~ Ano Ko wa Eirian; SMS Platoon's Theme ~ That Girl is an Alien)" | SMS Platoon | 1:01 |
| 14. | "Ninjīn Loves you yeah! (ニンジーン Loves you yeah!; Carrot Loves you yeah!)" | Ranka Lee = Megumi Nakajima | 1:02 |
| 15. | ""Chō Jikū Hanten Nyan Nyan" CM Song (Ranka Version) (「超時空飯店 娘々」CMソング(Ranka Version); "Super Dimension Restaurant Nyan Nyan" Jingle (Ranka Version))" | Megumi Nakajima | 0:24 |
| 16. | "Alto's Theme" | | 2:03 |
| 17. | "TALLY HO!" | | 4:33 |
| 18. | "The Target" | | 5:33 |
| 19. | "Bajura" | | 2:13 |
| 20. | "Kira Kira (キラキラ; Glitter)" | | 2:37 |
| 21. | "Aimo ~ Tori no Hito (アイモ～鳥のひと; Aimo ~ Bird Human)" | Ranka Lee = Megumi Nakajima | 3:36 |
| 22. | "Take Off" | | 1:49 |
| 23. | "Infinity (インフィニティ, Infiniti)" | Sheryl Nome starring May'n | 4:08 |
| 24. | "Diamond Crevasse (ダイアモンド クレバス, Daiamondo Kurebasu)" | Sheryl Nome starring May'n | 5:58 |
| Total length: | | | 76:37 |

=== O.S.T.2 Nyan TRA☆ ===
Macross Frontier O.S.T.2 Nyan TRA☆

Soundtrack album by Yoko Kanno, Sheryl Nome starring May'n, Ranka Lee = Megumi Nakajima and Maaya Sakamoto
- Released: October 8, 2008
- Genre: Anime soundtrack
- Length: 74:35
- Label: Victor Entertainment

Macross Frontier O.S.T.2 Nyan TRA☆ (マクロスF O.S.T.2 娘トラ☆, Makurosu Furontia O.S.T.2 Nyan Tora; Macross Frontier O.S.T.2 Girls TRA☆) is the second soundtrack album of Macross Frontier. The album features opening, ending themes and insert songs from the second half of the series.

Track listing

All music is composed by Yoko Kanno except track #13 by Kazuhiko Katō with arrangement by Yoko Kanno.

Catalog Number: VTCL-60061
| No. | Title | Vocals | Length |
|---|---|---|---|
| 1. | "Prologue F" | | 1:40 |
| 2. | "Northern Cross (ノーザンクロス, Nōzan Kurosu)" | Sheryl Nome starring May'n | 4:53 |
| 3. | "Triangler (fight on stage) (トライアングラー, Toraiangurā)" | Sheryl Nome starring May'n & Ranka Lee = Megumi Nakajima | 5:00 |
| 4. | "High School Life" | | 1:18 |
| 5. | "Transformation (トランスフォーメーション, Toransufōmēshon)" | | 2:29 |
| 6. | "Anata no Oto (アナタノオト; Your Sound)" | Ranka Lee = Megumi Nakajima | 5:02 |
| 7. | "Test Flight Delight" | | 2:18 |
| 8. | "Seikan Hikō (星間飛行; Interstellar Flight)" | Ranka Lee = Megumi Nakajima | 3:54 |
| 9. | "Inumimi Ranka (イヌミミランカ; Dog-ears Ranka)" | | 1:47 |
| 10. | "Yōsei (妖精; Fairy)" | Sheryl Nome starring May'n | 5:16 |
| 11. | "Tsuioku no Trumpet (追憶のトランペット, Tsuioku no Toranpetto; Reminiscence Trumpet)" | | 1:36 |
| 12. | "Shinkū no Diamond Crevasse (真空のダイアモンド クレバス, Shinkū no Daiamondo Kurebasu; Diamond Crevasse in Vacuum)" | Sheryl Nome starring May'n | 5:03 |
| 13. | "Ai Oboete Imasu ka ~ bless the little queen (愛・おぼえていますか; Do You Remember Love?)" | Ranka Lee = Megumi Nakajima | 4:29 |
| 14. | "Ao no Ether (蒼のエーテル, Ao no Ēteru; Azure Ether)" | Ranka Lee = Megumi Nakajima | 3:47 |
| 15. | "is this LOVE?" | | 2:30 |
| 16. | "shadow of Michael" | | 3:46 |
| 17. | "Aimo O.C. (アイモ O.C.)" | Ranka Lee = Megumi Nakajima | 4:41 |
| 18. | "Battle Frontier" | | 6:03 |
| 19. | "Nyan Nyan Service Medley (娘々サービスメドレー, Nyan Nyan Sābisu Medorē): 1. Lion (ライオン, Raion) (1st verse to 1st chorus); 2. Infinity (インフィニティ, Infiniti); 3. Watashi no Kare wa Pilot (私の彼はパイロット, Watashi no Kare wa Pairotto; My Boyfriend is a Pilot); 4. Diamond Crevasse (ダイアモンド クレバス, Daiamondo Kurebasu); 5. Seikan Hikō (星間飛行; Interstellar Flight); 6. What 'bout my star?; 7. Lion (ライオン, Raion) (2nd chorus); 8. Ai Oboete Imasu ka (愛・おぼえていますか; Do You Remember Love?); 9. Lion (ライオン, Raion) (Final verse to final chorus); 10. Aimo (アイモ)" | Sheryl Nome starring May'n, Ranka Lee = Megumi Nakajima & Maaya Sakamoto | 7:28 |
| 20. | "Protoculture (プロトカルチュア, Purotokarucha)" | | 1:35 |
| Total length: | | | 74:35 |

=== Vocal Collection Nyan Tama♀ ===
Macross Frontier Vocal Collection Nyan Tama♀

Compilation album by Yoko Kanno, Sheryl Nome starring May'n, Ranka Lee = Megumi Nakajima and Maaya Sakamoto
- Released: December 3, 2008
- Genre: Anime soundtrack
- Length: 143:08
- Label: Victor Entertainment

Macross Frontier VOCAL COLLECTION Nyan Tama♀ (マクロスF (フロンティア) VOCAL COLLECTION 娘たま♀, Makurosu Furontia VOCAL COLLECTION Nyan Tama) is a complete collection compilation album of opening-ending themes and insert songs of Macross Frontier. This album also features unreleased songs from the two soundtracks.

Track listing

All music is composed by Yoko Kanno except disc 1/track #11 by Kentarō Haneda and disc 1/track #18 and disc 2/track #9 by Kazuhiko Katō.

Disc 1 (VTCL-60100)
| No. | Title | Vocals | Length |
|---|---|---|---|
| 1. | "Triangler (トライアングラー, Toraiangurā)" | Maaya Sakamoto | 4:39 |
| 2. | "What 'bout my star?@Formo" | Sheryl Nome starring May'n & Ranka Lee = Megumi Nakajima | 4:47 |
| 3. | "Aimo (アイモ)" | Ranka Lee = Megumi Nakajima | 1:34 |
| 4. | "Diamond Crevasse ~ Tenbō Kōen ni te (ダイアモンド クレバス～展望公園にて, Daiamondo Kurebasu ~ Tenbō Kōen ni te; Diamond Crevasse ~ In the Park View)" | Sheryl Nome starring May'n & Ranka Lee = Megumi Nakajima | 0:44 |
| 5. | "Welcome To My FanClub's Night!" | Sheryl Nome starring May'n | 3:45 |
| 6. | "Iteza Gogo Kuji Don't be late (射手座☆午後九時Don't be late; Sagittarius☆9pm Don't be late)" | Sheryl Nome starring May'n | 5:44 |
| 7. | "What 'bout my star?" | Sheryl Nome starring May'n | 5:07 |
| 8. | "Infinity #7 (インフィニティ #7, Infiniti Nanbā Sebun)" | Sheryl Nome starring May'n & Ranka Lee = Megumi Nakajima | 4:07 |
| 9. | ""Chō Jikū Hanten Nyan Nyan" CM Song (Ranka Version) (「超時空飯店 娘々」CMソング(Ranka Version); "Super Dimension Restaurant Nyan Nyan" Jingle (Ranka Version))" | Ranka Lee = Megumi Nakajima | 0:21 |
| 10. | "Seikan Hikō (星間飛行; Interstellar Flight)" | Ranka Lee = Megumi Nakajima | 3:58 |
| 11. | "Watashi no Kare wa Pilot (私の彼はパイロット, Watashi no Kare wa Pairotto; My Boyfriend is a Pilot)" | Ranka Lee = Megumi Nakajima | 2:46 |
| 12. | "Neko Nikki (ねこ日記; Cat Diary)" | Ranka Lee = Megumi Nakajima | 4:11 |
| 13. | "Ninjīn Loves you yeah! (ニンジーン Loves you yeah!; Carrot Loves you yeah!)" | Ranka Lee = Megumi Nakajima | 1:02 |
| 14. | "Uchū Kyōdaibune (宇宙兄弟船; Brother Spaceship)" | Ichirō Dokugawa | 1:46 |
| 15. | "SMS Shōtai no Uta ~ Ano Ko wa Alien (SMS小隊の歌～あの娘はエイリアン, SMS Shōtai no Uta ~ Ano Ko wa Eirian; SMS Platoon's Theme ~ That Girl is an Alien)" | SMS Platoon | 1:02 |
| 16. | "Aimo O.C. (アイモ O.C.)" | Ranka Lee = Megumi Nakajima | 4:58 |
| 17. | "Aimo ~ Tori no Hito (アイモ～鳥のひと; Aimo ~ Bird Human)" | Ranka Lee = Megumi Nakajima | 3:36 |
| 18. | "Ai Oboete Imasu ka (愛・おぼえていますか; Do You Remember Love?)" | Ranka Lee = Megumi Nakajima | 5:00 |
| 19. | "Diamond Crevasse (ダイアモンド クレバス, Daiamondo Kurebasu)" | Sheryl Nome starring May'n | 5:59 |
| 20. | "Aimo ~Koi no Uta~ (アイモ～こいのうた～, Aimo ~Love Song~)" | Maaya Sakamoto | 2:16 |
| 21. | "Infinity #7 (without vocals) (インフィニティ #7)" (bonus track) | | 4:07 |
| 22. | "Ninjīn Loves you yeah! (without vocals) (ニンジーン Loves you yeah!, Carrot Loves you yeah!)" (bonus track) | | 1:01 |
| Total length: | | | 72:19 |

Disc 2 (VTCL-60101)
| No. | Title | Vocals | Length |
|---|---|---|---|
| 1. | "Lion (ライオン, Raion)" | Sheryl Nome starring May'n & Ranka Lee = Megumi Nakajima | 5:06 |
| 2. | "Diamond Crevasse 50/50 (ダイアモンド クレバス 50/50, Daiamondo Kurebasu 50/50)" | Sheryl Nome starring May'n & Ranka Lee = Megumi Nakajima | 2:32 |
| 3. | "Sheryl no Aimo (シェリルのアイモ, Sheriru no Aimo; Sheryl's Aimo)" | Sheryl Nome starring May'n | 2:15 |
| 4. | "Yōsei (妖精; Fairy)" | Sheryl Nome starring May'n | 5:15 |
| 5. | "Northern Cross (ノーザンクロス, Nōzan Kurosu)" | Sheryl Nome starring May'n | 4:57 |
| 6. | "Brera to Ko-Ranka no Aimo (ブレラと子ランカのアイモ; Brera and Little Ranka's Aimo)" | Ranka Lee = Megumi Nakajima | 0:26 |
| 7. | "Anata no Oto (アナタノオト; Your Sound)" | Ranka Lee = Megumi Nakajima | 5:01 |
| 8. | "Ao no Ether (蒼のエーテル, Ao no Ēteru; Azure Ether)" | Ranka Lee = Megumi Nakajima | 3:48 |
| 9. | "Ai Oboete Imasu ka ~ bless the little queen (愛・おぼえていますか, Ai oboeteimasuka; Do You Remember Love?)" | Ranka Lee = Megumi Nakajima | 4:31 |
| 10. | "Nyan Nyan Special Service Medley (Toku Mori) (娘々スペシャルサービスメドレー (特盛り), Nyan Nyan Supesharu Sābisu Medorē (Tokumori); Nyan Nyan Special Service Medley (Special Serving)): 1. Lion (ライオン, Raion) (1st verse to 1st chorus); 2. Infinity (インフィニティ, Infiniti); 3. Watashi no Kare wa Pilot (私の彼はパイロット, Watashi no Kare wa Pairotto; My Boyfriend is a Pilot); 4. Diamond Crevasse (ダイアモンド クレバス, Daiamondo Kurebasu); 5. Seikan Hikō (星間飛行; Interstellar Flight); 6. What 'bout my star?; 7. Iteza☆Gogo Kuji Don't be late (射手座☆午後九時Don't be late; Sagittarius☆9pm Don't be late); 8. Triangler (トライアングラー, Toraiangurā); 9. Anata no Oto (アナタノオト; Your Sound); 10. Aimo (アイモ); 11. What 'bout my star?; 12. Lion (ライオン, Raion) (2nd chorus); 13. Ai Oboete Imasu ka (愛・おぼえていますか, Watashi no Kare wa Pairotto; Do You Remember Love?); 14. Lion (ライオン, Raion) (Final verse to final chorus)" | Sheryl Nome starring May'n & Ranka Lee = Megumi Nakajima | 12:25 |
| 11. | "Triangler (fight on stage) (トライアングラー, Toraiangurā)" | Sheryl Nome starring May'n & Ranka Lee = Megumi Nakajima | 5:04 |
| 12. | "Haha to Ko-Ranka no Aimo (母と子ランカのアイモ; Mother and Little Ranka's Aimo)" | Ranka Lee = Megumi Nakajima & Maaya Sakamoto | 2:13 |
| 13. | "Nyan Nyan Special Service Medley (Toku Mori without vocals) (娘々スペシャルサービスメドレー (特盛り without vocals), Nyan Nyan Special Service Medley (Special Serving without vocals))" (bonus track) | | 12:27 |
| 14. | "Anata no Oto (without vocals) (アナタノオト; Your Sound)" (bonus track) | | 4:59 |
| Total length: | | | 70:49 |

=== Universal Bunny ===
Universal Bunny

EP by Sheryl Nome starring May'n (シェリル・ノーム starring May'n)
- Released: November 25, 2009
- Genre: J-Pop
- Length: 36:49
- Label: Victor Entertainment

Universal Bunny (ユニバーサル・バニー, Yunibāsaru Banī) is May'n's Sheryl Nome mini-album for the first movie adaptation of Macross Frontier. The mini-album includes pink monsoon as its leading single which is used as an insert song and was released one month ahead at May'n's 20th birthday. The second songs revealed is Universal Bunny which was used as the commercial song for the movie.

Track listing

All music is composed by Yoko Kanno.

Catalog Number: VTCL-60177
| No. | Title | Lyrics | Length |
|---|---|---|---|
| 1. | "Universal Bunny (ユニバーサル・バニー, Yunibāsaru Banī)" | Shihori, PA-NON, Gabriela Robin | 5:57 |
| 2. | "pink monsoon" | Gabriela Robin | 4:43 |
| 3. | "Giragira Summer (^ω^)ノ (ギラギラサマー, Giragira Samā; Sparkling Summer)" | Gabriela Robin, Keisuke Tominaga | 5:00 |
| 4. | "Izolado (イゾラド, Izorado; Isolation)" | Toshiaki Yamada | 4:40 |
| 5. | "Aenai Toki (会えないとき; Time Without You)" | Gabriela Robin | 2:34 |
| 6. | "Eien (永遠; Eternity)" | Gabriela Robin | 4:21 |
| 7. | "Obelisk (オベリスク, Oberisuku)" | Gabriela Robin | 4:48 |
| 8. | "Tenshi ni Nacchatta (universal version) (天使になっちゃった; I Have Become an Angel)" | Gabriela Robin | 4:42 |
| Total length: | | | 36:49 |

=== Macross Frontier Concept Album "cosmic cuune" ===
Macross Frontier Concept Album "cosmic cuune"

EP by Ranka Lee = Megumi Nakajima (ランカ・リー = 中島愛), Sheryl Nome starring May'n (シェリル・ノーム starring May'n) and Frontier Stars.
- Released: November 24, 2010
- Genre: J-Pop
- Length: 41:27
- Label: Victor Entertainment

Macross Frontier Concept Album "cosmic cuune" (マクロスF コンセプトアルバム「cosmic cuune」(コズミックキューン)) is a Christmas-themed compilation from the anime series "Macross Frontier" including tunes newly composed by Yoko Kanno. It was initially announced that the album would include seven tracks, but one more track was added later. The resulting eight tracks are: two songs by Ranka, two by Sheryl, three duets by the two singers, and one by the two singers and the "Frontier Stars." The "Stars" are: Alto, Ranka, Sheryl, Michel, Clan, Bobby, Monica, and Ram. The Sheryl included in the Stars refers to voice actress Aya Endo, who participates as voice-over.

Songs from this album will be featured in two concerts entitled "Chōjiku [Super-dimensional] Super Live: Merry Christmas Without You", one to be held at Budokan on December 22, 2010, and the other at Kobe Port Island Hall (World Memory Hall) on December 24, 2010.

Track listing

All music is composed by Yoko Kanno.

Catalog Number: VTCL-60230
| No. | Title | Lyrics | Vocals | Length |
|---|---|---|---|---|
| 1. | "Songbird" | Natsuo Giniro | Ranka Lee = Megumi Nakajima | 5:13 |
| 2. | "Silent de Nanka Irarenai (サイレントでなんかいられない, Sairento de Nanka Irarenai; I can't be silent)" | Kō Ichikura | Sheryl Nome starring May'n / Ranka Lee = Megumi Nakajima | 4:47 |
| 3. | "Seikan Eve (星間イヴ, Seikan Ivu; Interstellar Eve)" (Seikan Hikō Christmas ver.) | Takashi Matsumoto | Ranka Lee = Megumi Nakajima / Sheryl Nome starring May'n | 5:29 |
| 4. | "Ranka no "Kutsushita no Uta" (ランカの「くつしたのうた。」; Ranka's "Stockings Song")" | Gabriela Robin | Ranka Lee = Megumi Nakajima | 4:49 |
| 5. | "Liebe ~ Maboroshi no Hikari (リーベ～幻の光, Rībe ~ Maboroshi no Hikari; Love~Phantom Light)" | Yūho Iwasato | Sheryl Nome starring May'n | 4:56 |
| 6. | "Funanori (ふなのり; Sailor)" | Gabriela Robin | Sheryl Nome starring May'n | 5:07 |
| 7. | "Merry Christmas without You" | Toshiaki Yamada | Sheryl Nome starring May'n / Ranka Lee = Megumi Nakajima / frontier stars | 6:11 |
| 8. | "Tablet (タブレット, Taburetto)" | Gabriela Robin | Sheryl Nome starring May'n / Ranka Lee = Megumi Nakajima | 5:01 |

=== Macross Frontier ~Sayonara no Tsubasa~ Netabare Album The End of "Triangle" ===
Macross Frontier ~Sayonara no Tsubasa~ Netabare Album The End of "Triangle"

Soundtrack album by Yoko Kanno, May'n, Megumi Nakajima
- Released: March 9, 2011
- Genre: Anime soundtrack
- Length: 1:13:47
- Label: Victor Entertainment

Macross Frontier ~Sayonara no Tsubasa~ Netabare Album The End of "Triangle" (劇場版マクロスF サヨナラノツバサ netabare album the end of "triangle", Gekijōban Makurosu Furontia Sayonara no Tsubasa netabare album the end of "triangle") is the soundtrack album for the second movie adaptation of Macross Frontier entitled Macross Frontier ~Sayonara no Tsubasa~.

Track listing

All music is composed by Yoko Kanno.

VTCL-60260
| No. | Title | Vocals | Length |
|---|---|---|---|
| 1. | "Kindan no Elixir (禁断のエリクシア, Kindan no Erikushia; Forbidden Elixir)" | May'n | 5:18 |
| 2. | "The Isle of Mayan" | | 1:31 |
| 3. | "Niji-iro Kuma Kuma (虹いろ・クマクマ; Rainbow-colored Bear)" | Megumi Nakajima | 4:52 |
| 4. | "Koi wa Dogfight (First Live in Atlantis Dome) (恋はドッグファイト (FIRST LIVE in アトランティスドーム), Koi wa Doggufaito (FIRST LIVE in Atorantisu Dōmu); Love is a Dogfight (First Live in Atlantis Dome))" | Megumi Nakajima | 5:09 |
| 5. | "Ai-kun to Watashi (アイ君と私; Ai-kun and Me)" | | 1:32 |
| 6. | "Seikan Hikō (Live in Alcatraz) (星間飛行 (Live in アルカトラズ), Seikan Hikō (Live in Arukatorazu); Interstellar Flight (Live in Alcatraz))" | Megumi Nakajima | 4:14 |
| 7. | "Get it on ~ Kōsoku Climax (Get it on～光速クライmax, Get it on ~ Kōsoku Kuraimax; Get in on ~ Light Speed Climax)" | May'n & Megumi Nakajima | 4:21 |
| 8. | "Nejire Trauma (ねじれトラウマ, Nejire Torauma; Twisted Trauma)" | | 2:46 |
| 9. | "Tori Aimo (島アイモ; Island Aimo)" | Megumi Nakajima | 1:34 |
| 10. | "Hōkago Overflow (放課後オーバーフロウ, Hōkago Ōbāfurō; After School Overflow)" | Megumi Nakajima | 5:30 |
| 11. | "Wilders (ワイルダーズ, Wairudāzu)" | | 2:14 |
| 12. | "Nyan Nyan Final Attack Frontier Greatest☆Hits! (娘々Final Attack フロンティア グレイテスト☆ヒッツ!, Nyan Nyan Final Attack Furontia Gureitesuto Hittsu!)" | May'n & Megumi Nakajima | 7:30 |
| 13. | "Sayonara no Tsubasa ~ the end of triangle (サヨナラノツバサ～the end of triangle; Wings of Goodbye ~ the end of triangle)" | May'n & Megumi Nakajima | 7:19 |
| 14. | "Hoshi Kira (ホシキラ; Sparkling Star)" | Megumi Nakajima | 4:45 |
| 15. | "dShootistarb (dシュディスタb, d Shudisuta b)" | May'n & Megumi Nakajima | 5:40 |
| 16. | "F Refrain" | | 2:59 |
| 17. | "Diamond Crevasse ~ Thank You, Frontier (ダイアモンド クレバス～Thank You, Frontier), Daiamondo Kurebasu ~ Thank You, Frontier)" | May'n | 6:40 |

== Singles ==
=== Triangler ===
"Triangler" is the first opening of Macross Frontier.

=== Diamond Crevasse / Iteza Gogo Kuji Don't be late ===
"Diamond Crevasse / Iteza Gogo Kuji Don't be late"

Single by Sheryl Nome starring May'n (シェリル・ノームstarring May'n)
- Released: (Japan) May 08, 2008
- Genre: J-Pop
- Length: 23:23
- Label: Victor Entertainment

"Diamond Crevasse / Iteza☆Gogo Kuji Don't be late" (ダイアモンド クレバス / 射手座☆午後九時Don't be late, Daiamondo Kurebasu/Iteza Gogo Kuji Donto Bī Reito) is May'n's re-debut single under Victor Entertainment label, released under stage name Sheryl Nome starring May'n. The song "Diamond Crevasse" was used as the second ending theme for Macross Frontier and "Iteza☆Gogo Kuji Don't be late" as an insert song performed by Sheryl Nome in the series.

Track listing

All music is composed by Yoko Kanno.

| No. | Title | Lyrics | Length |
|---|---|---|---|
| 1. | "Diamond Crevasse (ダイアモンド クレバス, Daiamondo Kurebasu)" | hal | 5:57 |
| 2. | "Iteza☆Gogo Kuji Don't be late (射手座☆午後九時Don't be late; Sagittarius☆9PM Don't be late)" | Dai Satō, hal, Maiku Sugiyama, Gabriela Robin | 5:46 |
| 3. | "Diamond Crevasse (without Sheryl)" | | 5:57 |
| 4. | "Iteza Gogo Kuji Don't be late (without Sheryl)" | | 5:44 |
| Total length: | | | 23:23 |

=== Seikan Hikō ===
"Seikan Hikō"

Single by Megumi Nakajima = Ranka Lee
- Released: (Japan) June 25, 2008
- Genre: J-Pop
- Length: 19:23
- Label: Victor Entertainment
- Composer: Yoko Kanno
- Lyricist: Hiroshi Ichikura

Nakajima Megumi Singles singles chronology
| "Seikan Hikō" (2008) | "Lion" (2008) |

Music video
- "Seikan Hikō TV Size" on YouTube

"Seikan Hikō" (星間飛行; Interstellar Flight) is the debut single of both Megumi Nakajima and Ranka Lee. The songs "Ai Oboete Imasu ka" and "Watashi no Kare wa Pilot" were covers of Lynn Minmay's songs from The Super Dimension Fortress Macross and Macross: Do You Remember Love?.

Track listing

| No. | Title | Lyrics | Music | Arrangement | Length |
|---|---|---|---|---|---|
| 1. | "Seikan Hikō (星間飛行; Interstellar Flight)" | Takashi Matsumoto | Yoko Kanno | Yoko Kanno | 3:54 |
| 2. | "Neko Nikki (ねこ日記; Cat Diary)" | Hiroshi Ichikura | Yoko Kanno | Yoko Kanno | 4:20 |
| 3. | "Ai Oboete Imasu ka (Deculture Edition size) (愛・おぼえていますか (デカルチャーエディションsize), Ai Oboete Imasu ka (Dekaruchā Edishon size); Do You Remember Love? (Deculture Edition size))" | Kazumi Yasui | Kazuhiko Katō | Yoko Kanno | 2:41 |
| 4. | "Watashi no Kare wa Pilot -MISS MACROSS 2059- (私の彼はパイロット -MISS MACROSS 2059-, Watashi no Kare wa Pairotto -MISS MACROSS 2059-; My Boyfriend is a Pilot)" | Akane Asa | Kentarō Haneda | Yoko Kanno, Hisaaki Hokari | 1:56 |
| 5. | "Seikan Hikō (without Ranka)" | | Yoko Kanno | Yoko Kanno | 3:53 |
| 6. | "Ai Oboete Imasu ka (Deculture Edition size without Ranka)" | | Kazuhiko Katō | Yoko Kanno | 2:39 |
| Total length: | | | | | 19:23 |

=== Lion ===
"Lion"

Single by May'n and Megumi Nakajima

from the album May'n☆Street; I Love You
- B-side: "Northern Cross"
- Released: (Japan) August 20, 2008
- Genre: J-Pop
- Length: 20:42
- Label: Victor Entertainment
- Composer: Yoko Kanno
- Lyricist: Gabriela Robin

"Lion" (ライオン, Raion) is May'n's fifth single and Megumi Nakajima's second single. "Lion" and "Northern Cross" were used as the second opening and ending theme for Macross Frontier.

Track listing

All music is composed by Yoko Kanno.

| No. | Title | Lyrics | Vocals | Length |
|---|---|---|---|---|
| 1. | "Lion (ライオン, Raion)" | Gabriela Robin | May'n & Megumi Nakajima | 5:06 |
| 2. | "Northern Cross (ノーザンクロス, Nōzan Kurosu)" | Yūho Iwasato, Gabriela Robin | May'n | 5:18 |
| 3. | "Lion (without vocal)" | | | 5:06 |
| 4. | "Northern Cross (without vocal)" | | | 5:12 |
| Total length: | | | | 20:42 |

=== Sheryl no Uchū Kyōdaibune Nado. ===
"Sheryl no Uchū Kyōdaibune Nado."

Single by Sheryl Nome and Bobby Margot
- B-side: "Bobby no Ninjin Tō."
- Released: (Japan) December 24, 2008
- Genre: J-Pop
- Length: 7:22
- Label: Victor Entertainment

"Sheryl no Uchū Kyōdaibune Nado." (シェリルの宇宙兄弟船 など。, Sheryl's Brother Spaceship and More.) is Sheryl Nome and Bobby Margot's special release. The single features Sheryl's cover of Ichirō Dokugawa's "Uchū Kyōdaibune" and Bobby's cover of Ranka Lee's "Ninjīn Loves you yeah!"

Track listing

All music is composed by Yoko Kanno.

| No. | Title | Vocals | Length |
|---|---|---|---|
| 1. | ""Sheryl no Uchū Kyōdaibune" (シェリルの宇宙兄弟船, Sheriru no Uchū Kyōdaibune; Sheryl's Brother Spaceship)" | Sheryl Nome | 1:54 |
| 2. | "Bobby no Ninjin Tō. (ボビーのニンジン等。, Bobī no Ninjin Tō.; Bobby's Carrots and Others.)" | Bobby Margot | 1:50 |
| 3. | "Sheryl no Uchū Kyōdaibune (Karaoke)" | | 1:54 |
| 4. | "Bobby no Ninjin Tō. (Karaoke)" | | 1:44 |
| Total length: | | | 7:22 |

=== Ranka to Bobby no SMS Shōtai no Uta Nado. ===
"Ranka to Bobby no SMS Shōtai no Uta Nado."

Single by Ranka Lee and Bobby Margot
- Released: (Japan) December 24, 2008
- Genre: J-Pop
- Length: 7:12
- Label: Victor Entertainment

Nakajima Megumi Singles singles chronology
| "Lion" (2008) | "Ranka to Bobby no SMS Shōtai no Uta Nado." (2008) | "Tenshi ni Naritai" (2008) |

"Ranka to Bobby no SMS Shōtai no Uta Nado." (ランカとボビーのSMS小隊の歌 など。, Ranka to Bobī no SMS Shōtai no Uta Nado.; Ranka and Bobby's SMS Platoon Theme and More.) is Ranka Lee and Bobby Margot's special release. The single features Ranka's cover of "SMS Platoon Theme" and Bobby's cover of Lynn Minmay's "Watashi no Kare wa Pilot"

| No. | Title | Lyrics | Music | Vocals | Length |
|---|---|---|---|---|---|
| 1. | "Ranka to Bobby no SMS Shōtai no Uta (ランカとボビーのSMS小隊の歌, Ranka to Bobī no SMS Shōtai no Uta; Ranka and Bobby's SMS Platoon Theme)" | Yoko Kanno | Yoko Kanno | Megumi Nakajima=Ranka Lee & Kenta Miyake=Bobby Margot | 1:01 |
| 2. | "Bobby no Watashi no Kare wa Pilot ~ Mōsō no Kare mo Pilot (ボビーの私の彼はパイロット~妄想の彼もパイロット, Bobī no Watashi no Kare wa Pairotto ~ Mōsō no Kare mo Pairotto; Bobby's My Boyfriend is a Pilot ~ The Delusional Guy is Also a Pilot)" | Akane Asa | Kentarō Haneda | Kenta Miyake=Bobby Margot | 2:38 |
| 3. | "Ranka to Bobby no SMS Shōtai no Uta (Karaoke)" | | Yoko Kanno | | 1:01 |
| 4. | "Bobby no Watashi no Kare wa Pilot ~ Mōsō no Kare mo Pilot (Karaoke)" | | Kentarō Haneda | | 2:32 |
| Total length: | | | | | 7:12 |

=== pink monsoon ===
"pink monsoon"

Single by Sheryl Nome starring May'n (シェリル・ノームstarring May'n)

from the album Universal Bunny
- B-side: "Tenshi ni Nacchatta"
- Released: (Japan) October 21, 2009
- Genre: J-Pop
- Label: Victor Entertainment

"pink monsoon" is May'n's fourth single, released under stage name Sheryl Nome starring May'n. The song "pink monsoon" is described as Sheryl Nome's debut single released at the age of 16 and was used as insert songs for the first movie adaptation of Macross Frontier along with "Tenshi ni Nacchatta". A preview for "pink monsoon" was featured in Macross Frontier Drama CD◎Nyan Dra Dra4.

Track listing

All lyrics are written by Gabriela Robin; all music is composed by Yoko Kanno.

| No. | Title | Length |
|---|---|---|
| 1. | "pink monsoon" | 4:44 |
| 2. | "Tenshi ni Nacchatta (天使になっちゃった; I Have Become an Angel)" | 4:20 |
| 3. | "pink monsoon w/o sheryl" | 4:46 |
| 4. | "Tenshi ni Nacchatta w/o sheryl" | 4:14 |
| Total length: | | 18:04 |

=== CM Ranka ===
"CM Ranka"

Single by Ranka Lee=Megumi Nakajima; ランカ・リー = 中島愛
- Released: (Japan) December 16, 2009
- Genre: J-Pop
- Length: 13:10
- Label: Victor Entertainment

Megumi Nakajima Singles singles chronology
| "Jellyfish no Kokuhaku" (2009) | "CM Ranka" (2009) | "Melody" (2010) |

CM Ranka (CM ランカ), this single contains songs sung by Megumi Nakajima in the movie Macross Frontier The Movie: The False Songstress, the song "Sō da yo" was used as ending theme of the movie, from second to seventh track are songs of commercials sung by Ranka in the movie, except Ninjin loves you yeah! The eighth track on the CD was confirmed on the official website of Flying Dog.

Track listing

All music is composed by Yoko Kanno.

| No. | Title | Lyrics | Length |
|---|---|---|---|
| 1. | "Sō da yo. (そうだよ。; It Is So.)" | Maaya Sakamoto / Gabriela Robin | 4:01 |
| 2. | "Starlight Nattō (スターライト納豆, Sutāraito Nattō; Starlight Fermented Soybeans)" | Hiroshi Ichikura | 1:49 |
| 3. | "Dynam Chōgōkin (ダイナム超合金, Dainamu Chōgōkin; Dynam Toy Brand)" | Eiji Kurokawa | 1:32 |
| 4. | "Kaitaku Jūki (開拓重機; Reclamation Heavy Machinery)" | Hiroshi Ichikura | 1:19 |
| 5. | "Daruma Seminar (だるまゼミナール, Daruma Semināru; Daruma Doll Seminar)" | Hiroshi Ichikura | 0:42 |
| 6. | "Ninjīn loves you yeah! (ニンジーン loves you yeah!; Carrots loves you yeah!)" | Hiroshi Ichikura | 1:03 |
| 7. | "Family Mart Cosmos (ファミリーマート・コスモス, Famirī Māto Kosumosu)" | Hiroshi Ichikura | 1:41 |
| 8. | "Koi no Dogfight (Chotto Dake) (恋のドッグファイト（ちょっとだけ）, Koi no Doggufaito (Chotto Dake); Love's Dog Fight (Just a Little Bit))" | Eiji Kurokawa | 1:03 |
| Total length: | | | 13:10 |

=== Hōkago Overflow ===
"Hōkago Overflow"

Single by Megumi Nakajima = Ranka Lee, and May'n = Sheryl Nome
- Released: (Japan) January 25, 2011
- Genre: J-Pop
- Label: Victor Entertainment

Nakajima Megumi Singles singles chronology
| "Melody" (2010) | "Hōkago Overflow" (2011) |

"Hōkago Overflow (放課後オーバーフロウ, Hōkago Ōbāfurō; After-school Overflow) is the second single release from Ranka Lee for the movie Macross Frontier The Movie: The Wings of Goodbye. The single includes the B-side "Get it on-flying rock", sung with Sheryl, used in the PlayStation Portable game Macross Triangle Frontier.

Track listing

All music is composed by Yoko Kanno.

| No. | Title | Lyrics | Vocals | Length |
|---|---|---|---|---|
| 1. | "Hōkago Overflow (放課後オーバーフロウ, Hōkago Ōbāfurō; After-school Overflow)" | Gabriela Robin | Ranka Lee = Megumi Nakajima |
| 2. | "Get it on – flying rock" | Tim Jensen, Gabriela Robin | Ranka Lee = Megumi Nakajima / Sheryl Nome starring May'n |
| 3. | "Hōkago Overflow (w/o ranka lee)" |
| 4. | "Get it on – flying rock (w/o sheryl nome & ranka lee)" |

== Drama CDs ==
After the TV series of Macross Frontier ended in October 2008, a series of four drama CDs was announced titled Nyan Dra (娘ドラ, Girls' Drama), released each month from April to July 2009. Each CD features untold stories and a special character song performed by voice actors which is cover of famous song from previous Macross series and is described as "Super Dimensional Duet" (超時空デュエット, Chō Jikū Duet).

=== Nyan Dra 1 ===
Macross Frontier Drama CD◎Nyan Dra Dra1

Studio album audio drama
- Released: April 8, 2009
- Length: 42:43
- Label: Victor Entertainment

Macross Frontier Drama CD◎Nyan Dra Dra1 (マクロスF ドラマCD 娘ドラ◎ドラ1, Macross F Drama CD Girls' Drama◎Drama 1) is the first CD of the drama series. This drama CD features "Shao Pai Long", Lynn Minmay's songs from The Super Dimension Fortress Macross covered by Yuichi Nakamura and Sōichirō Hoshi under Alto Saotome and Brera Sterne character.

Track listing

Catalog Number: VTCL-60102
| No. | Title | Length |
|---|---|---|
| 1. | "Alto Meets Sky (アルト・ミーツ・スカイ)" | 11:48 |
| 2. | "Dōkutsu no Triangler (洞窟のトライアングラー, Cave's Triangler)" | 13:59 |
| 3. | "Sheryl no Doki Doki Shotaiken (シェリルのドキ♡ドキ初体験, Sheryl's First Experience on Doki Doki)" | 12:38 |
| 4. | "Shao Bai Long (小白竜, Little White Dragon)" | 4:17 |
| Total length: | | 42:43 |

=== Nyan Dra 2 ===
Macross Frontier Drama CD◎Nyan Dra Dra2

Studio album audio drama
- Released: May 6, 2009
- Length: 42:22
- Label: Victor Entertainment

Macross Frontier Drama CD◎Nyan Dra Dra2 (マクロスF ドラマCD 娘ドラ◎ドラ2, Macross F Drama CD Girls' Drama◎Drama 2) is the second CD of the drama series. This drama CD features "Runner", Lynn Minmay's songs from The Super Dimension Fortress Macross covered by Hiroshi Kamiya and Megumi Toyoguchi under Micheal Blanc and Klan Klan character.

Track listing

Catalog Number: VTCL-60103
| No. | Title | Length |
|---|---|---|
| 1. | "Luca to 3nin no Ghost (ルカと3人のゴースト, Ruka to Sannin no Gōsuto; Luca and Three Persons' Ghosts)" | 11:30 |
| 2. | "Ranka Idoling Chū (ランカ・アイドリング中!, Ranka, in Idoling!)" | 12:33 |
| 3. | "Pine Cake (パイン・ケーキ)" | 13:44 |
| 4. | "Runner (ランナー)" | 4:34 |
| Total length: | | 42:22 |

=== Nyan Dra 3 ===
Macross Frontier Drama CD◎Nyan Dra Dra3

Studio album audio drama
- Released: June 3, 2009
- Length: 49:37
- Label: Victor Entertainment

Macross Frontier Drama CD◎Nyan Dra Dra3 (マクロスF ドラマCD 娘ドラ◎ドラ3, Macross F Drama CD Girls' Drama◎Drama 3) is the third CD of the drama series. This drama CD features "Totsugeki Love Heart", FIRE BOMBER's songs from Macross 7 covered by Katsuyuki Konishi, Sanae Kobayashi and Kenta Miyake under Ozma Lee, Catherine Glass and Bobby Margot character.

Track listing

Catalog Number: VTCL-60104
| No. | Title | Length |
|---|---|---|
| 1. | "Alto to Sheryl to China Dress (アルトとシェリルとチャイナドレス, Alto, Sheryl and the China Dress)" | 12:22 |
| 2. | "Galaxy Memory (ギャラクシー・メモリー)" | 17:28 |
| 3. | "3nin Musume, Ima Hitotabi Seishun no Hikari to Kage (3人娘、いまひとたび青春の光と影, 3 Girls, Now Is a Youth's Single Moment of Light and Shadow)" | 15:29 |
| 4. | "Totsugeki Love Heart (突撃ラブハート, Charge! Love Heart)" | 4:17 |
| Total length: | | 49:37 |

=== Nyan Dra 4 ===
Macross Frontier Drama CD◎Nyan Dra Dra4

Studio album audio drama
- Released: July 8, 2009
- Length: 48:02
- Label: Victor Entertainment

Macross Frontier Drama CD◎Nyan Dra Dra4 (マクロスF ドラマCD 娘ドラ◎ドラ4, Macross F Drama CD Girls' Drama◎Drama 4) is the last CD of the drama series. This drama CD features "0-G Love", Lynn Minmay's songs from The Super Dimension Fortress Macross covered by Kikuko Inoue and Tomokazu Sugita under Grace O'Connor and Leon Mishima character.

Track listing

Catalog Number: VTCL-60105
| No. | Title | Length |
|---|---|---|
| 1. | "Nanase no Katte ni Happy Dream (ナナセの勝手にハッピードリーム, Nanase's Involuntary Happy Dream)" | 15:05 |
| 2. | "Trigger Blue (トリガー・ブルー)" | 14:13 |
| 3. | "Pixie Shōtai no Yūutsu (ピクシー小隊の憂鬱, The Melancholy of the Pixie Platoon)" | 14:40 |
| 4. | "0-G Love" | 4:02 |
| Total length: | | 48:02 |
