= May'n =

Japanese singer

- メイン
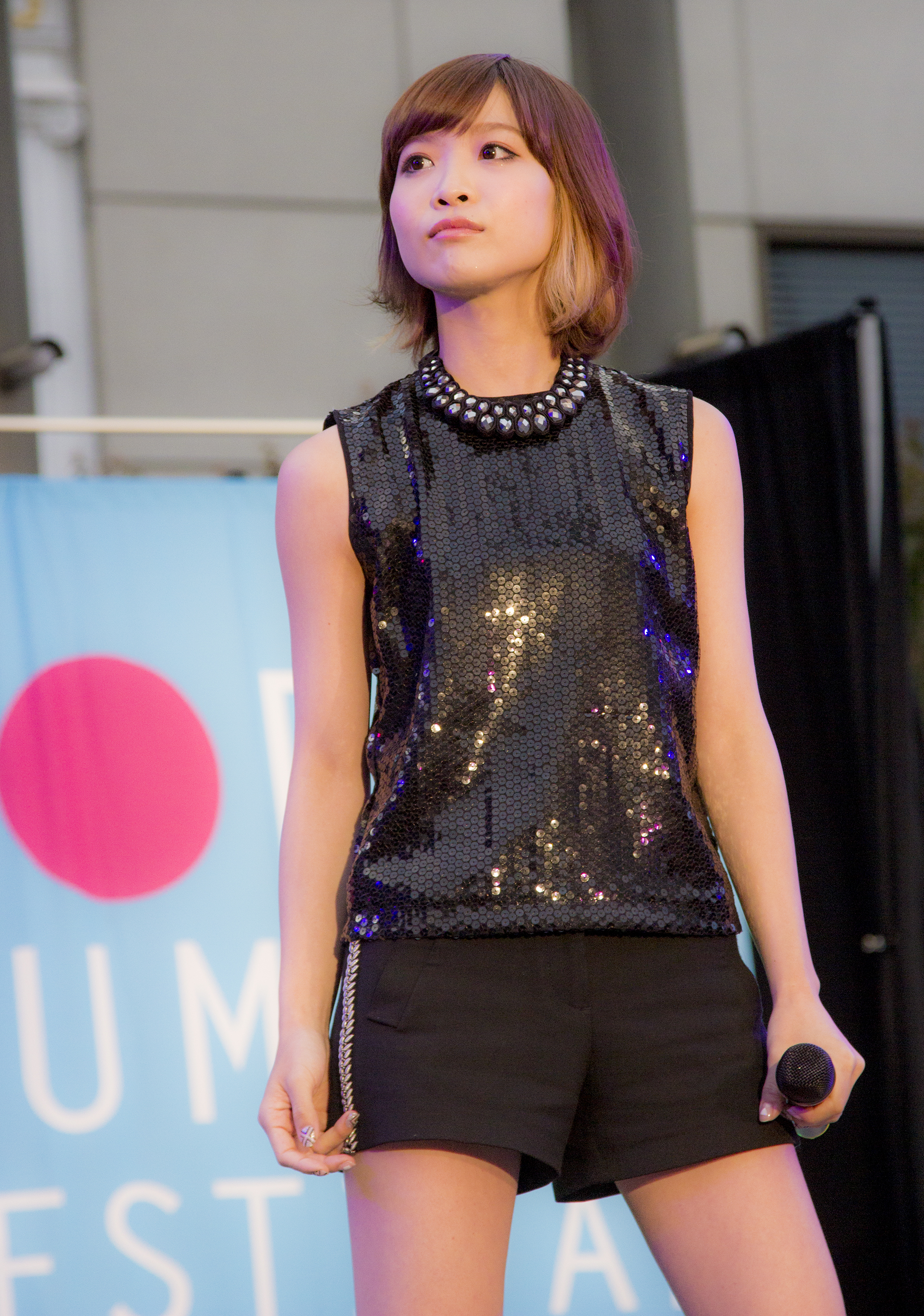
- May'n in 2014
- Born: Mei Nakabayashi; October 21, 1989 (age 37); Nagoya, Aichi Prefecture, Japan
- Occupation: Singer
- Years active: 2005–present
- Agent: Horipro International
- Height: 165 cm (5 ft 5 in)
- Musical career
- Genre: J-pop
- Instrument: Vocals
- Labels: Universal Music (2005–2007); Victor Entertainment (2007–2019); Digital Double (2020–present)
- Website: mayn.jp

Mei Nakabayashi (中林 芽依, Nakabayashi Mei; born October 21, 1989), better known by her stage name May'n (メイン, Mein), is a Japanese singer from Nagoya. Aspiring to become a singer since childhood, she began her music activities in 2003 upon passing an audition held by talent agency Horipro International. She made her major debut in 2005 under the Universal Music label with the release of her first single "Crazy Crazy Crazy". She would release two more singles under Universal Music, before transferring to Victor Entertainment in 2008. That same year, she had her break as the singing voice of the character Sheryl Nome in the anime series Macross Frontier.

May'n's musical style varies in genre, ranging from pop and rock, to dance music and R&B. Her music has been featured in anime series such as Macross Frontier, Aria the Scarlet Ammo, Accel World, Aquarion Logos, and Restaurant to Another World. She has also performed at several music events in Japan, Asia, Europe, and North America. In 2013, she represented Japan at the ABU TV Song Festival in Vietnam.

== Early life and childhood ==
Nakabayashi was born in Nagoya on October 21, 1989. She had become interested in music at an early age, and had been singing at least since she was three years old. She had also had an interest in anime series such as Sailor Moon since her childhood, particularly after an occurrence where she heard the series' theme "Moonlight Densetsu" at a karaoke bar. In 2003, at the age of 13, she participated in the 28th "HoriPro – Talent Scout Caravan – Love Music – Audition" (ホリプロ・タレントスカウトキャラバン・ラブミュージック・オーディション., Horipuro・Tarento Sukauto Kyaraban・Rabu Myūjikku・Ōdishon) and out of the 34,911 hopefuls, became one of the four who survived the final eliminations.

== Career ==
Nakabayashi debuted under the Universal Music Japan label with the release of her first single "Crazy Crazy Crazy" on April 27, 2005; the single was later re-released on June 1 of that year with an additional track. This was followed by the release of the digital single "Happy" in December of that year. Her second single, "Sympathy", was released on August 3, 2005. She then released her third single "Fallin' in or Not" on September 27, 2006, the title track of which was used as the ending theme for the anime series Love Get Chu.

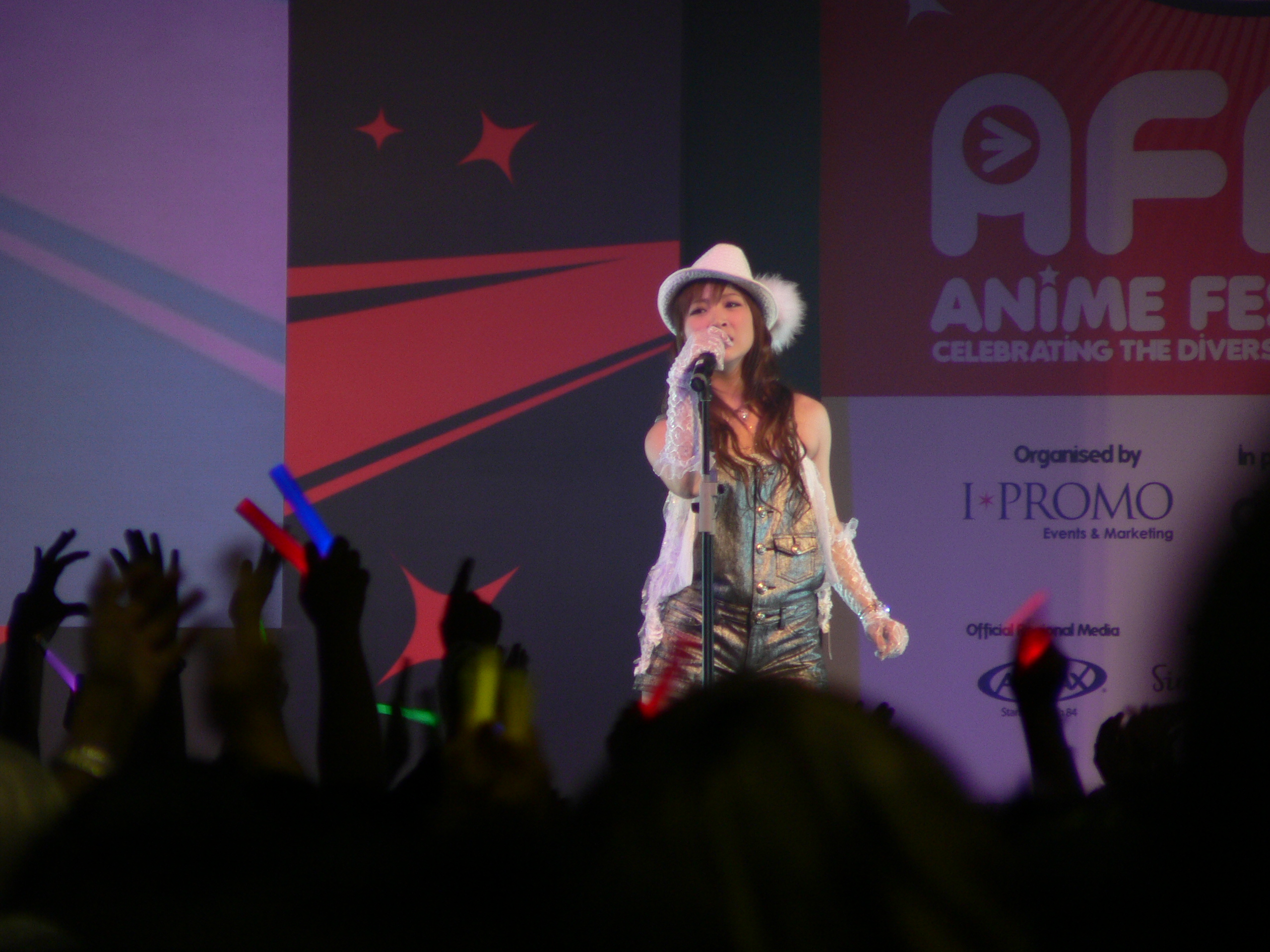
May'n performing at Anime Festival Asia 2008, in Singapore, November 2008

Nakabayashi transferred to Victor Entertainment in 2008 and began using the stage name May'n. That same year, she gained popularity after being cast as the singing voice of the character Sheryl Nome in the anime television series Macross Frontier. She later released two singles for the series, "Diamond Crevasse / Iteza Gogo Kuji Don't be late" (ダイアモンド クレバス/射手座☆午後九時Don’t be late) and "Lion", with each placing in the Top 3 on the Oricon Weekly Chart in their debut week. She was invited to perform "Iteza Gogo Kuji Don't be late" and "Northern Cross" at Animelo Summer Live 2008. She then gave her first live performance outside Japan in Singapore at Anime Festival Asia in November of that year. She has since become a regular guest at this event as well, also appearing at its iterations in Malaysia, Indonesia, and Thailand.

In January 2009, May'n released the mini-album May'n Street, which reached number 2 on the Oricon Weekly Chart in its first week. She then released the single "Kimi Shinitamō Koto Nakare" (キミシニタモウコトナカレ; Thou Shalt Not Die) on May 6, 2009; the title track is used as the opening theme to the anime series Shangri-La. Her first full album Styles was released in November 2009; the album reached number 7 on the Oricon Weekly charts. In January 2010, she performed her first solo Nippon Budokan concert, which sold out in only one day. In March of the same year, she held her first tour of Asia, with concerts in Malaysia, Hong Kong, and Taiwan. This was followed in July by a 17-city summer tour of Japan. She released her second album Cosmic Cuune in November 2010 as her character Sheryl Nome. In late 2010, she was chosen to record the theme song for the film Incite Mill -7 Day Death Game-. In February 2011, she released her 3D live documentary movie May'n The Movie: Phonic Nation, and later that month released her third album If you..., which made number 7 on the Oricon Weekly Chart. In March of that year, she held her second solo Budokan concert. She then made an appearance at Japan Expo in Paris. She also sang the song "Mr. Super Future Star", which was used as the theme song for the Capcom game E.X. Troopers.

In 2011 and 2012, May'n collaborated with music artist Daisuke Asakura for the singles "Scarlet Ballet", which was used as the opening theme to the anime series Aria the Scarlet Ammo, and "Chase the world", which was used as the opening theme to the anime series Accel World. She released her fourth album Heat on March 21, 2012. She represented Japan in October 2013 at the ABU TV Song Festival 2013 in Hanoi, Vietnam with her single "Vivid". She was scheduled to make an appearance at Animax Carnival Philippines in December 2013, but the event was cancelled as a result of the effects of Typhoon Haiyan.

In 2014, May'n released her fifth album New World. She then returned to the United States with a solo concert in San Francisco and a performance at Union Square for J-Pop Summit Festival 2014.

May'n performed "Yamaidare darlin'", which was used as the first opening theme to the 2015 anime television series Aquarion Logos, and later performed the songs "Yoake no Logos", which was used as the second opening theme to Aquarion Logos, and the series' second ending theme "Hontō no Koe wo Anata ni Azuketakute", which was performed with Haruka Chisuga. She released her fifth album Powers of Voice on September 7, 2015. She would also make an appearance at Animax Carnival Malaysia in March of that year. In 2016, she performed the song "Belief", which was used as the opening theme to the anime television series Taboo Tattoo. She performed the song "Hikari Aru Basho e", which is used as the ending theme to the 2016 anime television series Izetta: The Last Witch. She also appeared at Animax Carnival Philippines in October of that year.

In 2017, May'n collaborated with idol unit Wake Up, Girls! in performing the song "One in a Billion", which was used as the opening theme to the anime television series Restaurant to Another World. She made an appearance at Illinois' Anime Central event in May, and she also appeared at Anime Festival Asia Indonesia in August as a replacement for singer Ami Wajima, who had cancelled her appearance for health reasons. She released her sixth album Peace of Smile on October 30, 2017. She returned to Singapore in March 2018 for the anime event Anime Garden, and she appeared at the Anisong World Matsuri event in Los Angeles in July of that year. In September 2018, May'n and Megumi Nakajima, who played the role of Ranka Lee in Macross Frontier, released the single "Good job!"; it was their first Macross-related single in seven years. She released an album titled Yell!! and a single titled "Kiba to Tsubasa" (牙と翼) on July 31, 2019, which was used as the ending theme to the anime series Kochoki: Wakaki Nobunaga. She appeared at Cosplay Mania in the Philippines in September 2019.

In 2022, May'n became a part of the mixed-media project D4DJ, voicing the role of Neo of the in-universe group Abyssmare.

In 2026, May'n released "Love is the Strongest", the ending theme of the TV Asahi tokusatsu series Super Space Sheriff Gavan Infinity.

== Musical style and influences ==
May'n's musical style varies in genre, ranging from pop and rock, to dance music and R&B, and she cites artists such as Britney Spears, Madonna, Janet Jackson, and Namie Amuro as her musical influences. She also cites her relationship with composer Yoko Kanno as a major factor in her career.

In interviews with Anime News Network, May'n discussed her performance style and her experiences working with composers such as Kanno and Daisuke Asakura. She stated that her initial preferred genres were R&B and dance music, but collaborating with Kanno made her realize that her voice fit rock songs more. Whenever she performs theme songs for anime, she would try to "feel each character's heart." Since she had been cast as the singing voice of the character Sheryl Nome, she had a desire to "become" the character, although Kanno would give her advice that she should stop acting too much like Sheryl and instead be herself. As for her involvement with Asakura, she stated that she admired Asakura's work and that collaborating with him allowed her to explore new music styles that she had not attempted before. May'n also explained the reason for her stage name. She stated that she began using the name "May'n" when she started performing songs for anime series, and that the name was a play on the English word "main", as she wanted her songs to be seen as "main themes" to her audiences, and for her fans to consider her their "main singer".

May'n discussed the production of her song "You", used as the opening theme to the anime series The Ancient Magus' Bride, in a February 2018 interview with DaVinci News. She said that the song was meant to represent the relationship between the series' characters Chise and Elias, and in particular Elias' representation as a dark and sad character. She notes that, as the single was released during her 10th anniversary, she wanted to challenge herself to "get better" in singing, and to improve her weaknesses.

== Personal life ==
On December 28, 2025, May'n announced her marriage to guitarist Takashi Nakagawa.

== Discography ==
=== Albums ===
Released as	Year	Title	Oricon chart position			Ref.
Released as	Year	Title	Daily/weekly peak	Weeks	Sales	Ref.
May'n	2009	Styles: Label: Victor Entertainment (VTZL-11; VTCL-60190); Released: November 25, 2009	3/7	10	36,611	
Sheryl Nome starring May'n	2010	Cosmic Cuune: Label: Victor Entertainment (VTCL-60230); Released: November 24, 2010	5/6	10	49,663	
May'n	2011	If You...: Label: Victor Entertainment; Released: February 23, 2011	7/7	8	28,493	
May'n	2012	Heat: Label: Victor Entertainment; Released: March 21, 2012	5/9	9	19,525	
May'n	2014	New World: Label: Victor Entertainment; Released: January 29, 2014	6/9	6	15,334	
May'n	2017	Peace of Smile: Label: Victor Entertainment; Released: October 18, 2017	?/13	4	?	
May'n	2019	Yell!!: Label: Victor Entertainment; Released: July 31, 2019	24	TBA		
May'n	2024	Prismverse: Label: Victor Entertainment; Released: February, 14, 2024				

=== EPs ===
Released as	Year	Title	Oricon charting position			Ref.
Released as	Year	Title	Peak	Weeks	Sales	Ref.
May'n	2009	May'n Street (メイン☆ストリート, Mein Sutorīto): Label: Victor Entertainment (VTCL-60090); Released: January 21, 2009	2/2	9	37,503	
Sheryl Nome starring May'n	2009	Universal Bunny (ユニバーサル・バニー, Yunibāsaru Banī): Label: Victor Entertainment (VTCL-60177); Released: November 25, 2009	2/3	16	101,599	

=== Singles ===
Released as	Year	Title	Oricon chart position			Album	Theme song featured in	Ref.
Released as	Year	Title	Daily/weekly peak	Weeks	Sales	Album	Theme song featured in	Ref.
May Nakabayashi	2005	"Crazy Crazy Crazy": Label: Universal Music Japan (UPCI-5012); Released: April 27, 2005; June 1, 2005 (re-release)	—	—	—			
May Nakabayashi	2005	"Sympathy": Label: Universal Music Japan (UPCI-5018); Released: August 3, 2005	—	—	—	—		
May Nakabayashi	2006	"Fallin' in or Not" feat. SEAMO: Label: Universal Music Japan (UPCI-5039); Released: September 27, 2006	159	1	544		Love Get Chu: Miracle Voice Actress Hakusho	
Sheryl Nome starring May'n	2008	"Diamond Crevasse / Iteza☆Gogo Kuji Don't be late" (ダイアモンド クレバス / 射手座☆午後九時Don't be late, Daiamondo Kurebasu/Iteza Gogo Kuji Donto Bī Reito): Label: Victor Entertainment (VTCL-35025); Released: May 8, 2008	2/2	27	108,504	—	Macross Frontier	
Sheryl Nome starring May'n	2008	"Lion" (ライオン, Raion): Label: Victor Entertainment (VTCL-35033); Released: August 20, 2008	2/3	19	123,900	May'n Street	Macross Frontier	
May'n	2009	"Kimi Shinitamō Koto Nakare" (キミシニタモウコトナカレ; Thou Shalt Not Die): Label: Victor Entertainment (VTCL-35070); Released: May 6, 2009	5/10	14	20,671	Styles	Shangri-La	
Sheryl Nome starring May'n	2009	"Pink Monsoon": Label: Victor Entertainment (VTCL-35088); Released: October 21, 2009	2/5	9	38,703	Universal Bunny	Macross Frontier: Itsuwari no Utahime	
May'n	2010	"Ready Go!": Label: Victor Entertainment (VTCL-35093 ); Released: July 28, 2010	11/21	8	13,292	If You...	Ōkami-san to Shichinin no Nakamatachi	
May'n	2010	"Shinjitemiru" (シンジテミル; See the Truth): Label: Victor Entertainment (VTCL-35101); Released: October 13, 2010	12/14	4	8,513	If You...	Injitemiru 7-nichikan no Death Game	
May'n	2011	"Scarlet Ballet": Label: Victor Entertainment (VTCL-35106); Released: May 11, 2011	9/11	10	24,435	Heat	Aria the Scarlet Ammo	
May'n	2011	"Brain Diver": Label: Victor Entertainment (VTCL-35116); Released: November 2, 2011	16/18	6	8,320	Heat	Phi Brain: Puzzle of God	
May'n	2012	"Chase the world": Label: Victor Entertainment (VTCL-35135); Released: May 9, 2012	5/7	13	33,556	—	Accel World	
May'n	2013	"Run Real Run" w/ "アウトサイダー" (Outsider): Label: Victor Entertainment (VTCL-35150); Released: May 8, 2013	10/20	3	4,825	—	Real Onigokko The Origin / Onimusha Soul	
May'n	2013	"Vivid" w/ "ワイルドローズ" (Wild Rose): Label: Victor Entertainment (VTCL-35155); Release Date: July 24, 2013	15/19	5	7,876	—	Blood Lad/Ikenie no Dilemma	
May'n	2014	"Kyo ni Koiro" (今日に恋色; Today in Color of Love): Label: Victor Entertainment (VTCL-VTCL-35170); Released: January 29, 2014	—	—	—	—	Inari, Konkon, Koi Iroha	
May'n	2014	"Re:REMEMBER" w/ "誰がために": Label: Victor Entertainment (VTZL-81); Release Date: June 18, 2014	—	—	—	—	M3: Sono Kuroki Hagane	
May'n	2017	"Itoshisa to Setsunasa to Kokorozuyosa to": Release Date: May 31, 2017	—	—	—	—	Ultra Street Fighter II: The Final Challengers	
May'n	2018	"You": Release date: February 7, 2018	—	—	—	—	The Ancient Magus' Bride	
May'n	2019	"Kiba to Tsubasa" (牙と翼; Fangs and Wings): Release date: July 31, 2019	30	2	—	—	Kochoki: Wakaki Nobunaga	
May'n	2019	"Graphite/Diamond": Release date: November 20, 2019	18	8	—	—	Azur Lane (Anime)	

=== Digital singles ===
Year	Title	Theme song featured in
2005	"Happy": Released: December 11, 2005	
2007	"Ame ni Saku Hana" (雨に咲く花; Blooming Flowers in the Rain): Released: January 31, 2007	
2009	"My Teens, My Tears": Released: October 21, 2009	
2009	"Grand Piano": Released: November 25, 2009	
2010	"Ai wa Furu Hoshi no Gotoku" (愛は降る星のごとく; Love Is Like Falling Stars): Released: May 12, 2010	Saikyou Bushouden: Sangoku Engi
2012	"Aozora" (アオゾラ; Blue sky): Released: October 11, 2012	Btooom!
2012	"Mr. Super Future Star": Released: November 22, 2012	E.X. Troopers

=== DVDs and Blu-ray disks ===
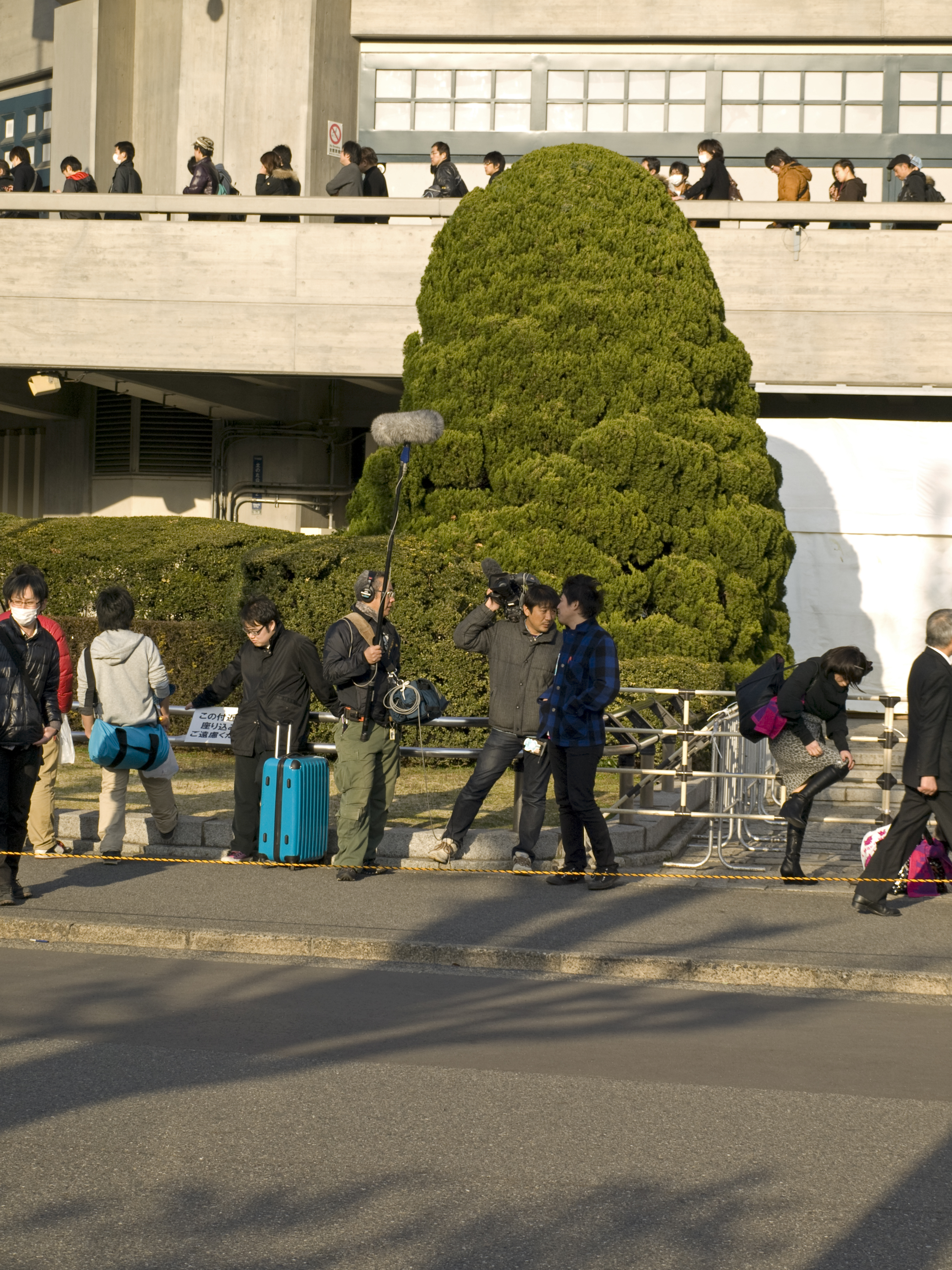
A TV group (front) and the queue (back) waiting for May'n Special Concert 2013 "MIC-A-MANIA" in Nippon Budokan, Tokyo, March 2013

Title	Date	Type	Label/distributor	Catalog no.	Note
May'n Act	March 25, 2009	DVD concert	Victor Entertainment	VTBL-3	May'n's concert at Akasaka Blitz on January 19, 2009, is recorded here.
May'n Special Concert BD Big Waaaaave!! in Nippon Budokan	May 26, 2010	Blu-ray concert	Victor Entertainment	VTXL-1	May'n's concert at Nippon Budokan on January 24, 2010, is recorded here.
May’n Special Concert DVD Big Waaaaave!! in Nippon Budokan	May 26, 2010	DVD concert	Victor Entertainment	VTBL-9	Same as above but on DVD
May'n Special Concert BD Rhythm Tank!! at Nippon Budokan	November 2, 2011	Blu-ray concert	Victor Entertainment	VTXL-7	May'n's concert at Nippon Budokan on March 6, 2011, is recorded here.
May’n Special Concert DVD Rhythm Tank!! at Nippon Budokan	November 2, 2011	DVD concert	Victor Entertainment	VTBL-17	Same as above but on DVD

=== Collaborations ===
Title	Date	Type	Label/distributor	Catalog no.	Note
Macross F (Frontier) O.S.T.1 "Nyan Fro"	June 4, 2008	CD album	Victor Entertainment	VTCL-60060	May'n is credited as "Sheryl Nome starring May'n".
Macross F (Frontier) O.S.T.2 "Nyan Tra"	October 8, 2008	CD album	Victor Entertainment	VTCL-60061	May'n is credited as "Sheryl Nome starring May'n".
Macross F (Frontier) Vocal Collection "Nyan Tama"	December 3, 2008	CD album (2 disks)	Victor Entertainment	VTCL-60100	May'n is credited as "Sheryl Nome starring May'n".
Macross F (Frontier) Galaxy Tour Final in Budokan	October 30, 2009	DVD concert	Bandai	BCBM-0011	
Macross F (Frontier) Galaxy Tour Final in Budokan	November 27, 2009	Blu-ray concert	Bandai	BCXE-0216	Same as above but on Blu-ray
Macross F (Frontier) Concept Album "Cosmic Cuune"	November 24, 2010	CD album	Victor Entertainment	VTCL-60230	May'n is credited as "Sheryl Nome starring May'n".
Yoko Kanno Produce Macross F Super Dimensional Super Live Cosmic Nyan Blu-ray	November 23, 2011	Blu-ray concert			
Yoko Kanno Produce Macross F Super Dimensional Super Live Cosmic Nyan DVD	November 23, 2011	DVD concert			
Kamen Rider Fourze ED Theme "Giant Step"	January 25, 2012	CD single	Avex Trax	AVCA-49427	May'n is credited as "Astronauts" along Yoshiharu Shiina.

Awards and achievements
Preceded by Perfume with "Spring of Life"	Japan in the ABU TV Song Festival; 2013 with "Vivid"	Succeeded by
