= List of Macross Frontier characters =

Cast of Macross Frontier.

This is a list of characters from the anime series Macross Frontier.

== Main characters ==
Alto Saotome (早乙女 アルト, Saotome Aruto)
Voiced by: Yuuichi Nakamura
- Age: 17, male.
The series' protagonist, Alto is a high school student in the Mihoshi Academy Pilot Training course. As a result of his fine features and long hair he is often mistaken for a girl at first glance, even receiving the nickname Hime (姫, "Princess"), much to his embarrassment. His appearance was revealed to have been inherited from his late mother, Miyo. Despite this, he is otherwise a rather normal, though somewhat aloof and standoffish, boy. Born into a well-known Kabuki family, his persistent yearning for the skies has made for a thorny relationship with his father, who has disowned him. He constantly frets about living aboard Macross Frontier due to the lack of a true 'sky'. After getting the chance to pilot the VF-25 Messiah variable fighter (due to its original pilot, Henry Gilliam, being killed by a large type Vajra in the first episode) his flying skills draw the attention of Ozma Lee, who accepts him as a candidate for the S.M.S. Skull Platoon. When S.M.S. grows suspicious of Leon and breaks away from the Frontier fleet, Alto remains as one of the few S.M.S. members who stays behind on Frontier. He later joins the N.U.N.S. forces and is assigned to the 4th Fighter Wing as squad leader (three fighters) with the call sign Sagittarius-1. As a result, he is given a new VF-171EX variable fighter. After being told by Leon Mishima that Ranka may become a tool for the Vajra in their war against humanity, Alto vows to kill her if necessary to save the Macross Frontier fleet. He is presumed dead after his VF-171EX is destroyed by Brera Sterne's VF-27 during the initial stages of the final battle between the Macross Frontier fleet and the Vajra. However, Alto reveals he had ejected from the VF-171EX before it was shot down. He resumes the fight in his original VF-25 Messiah, stopping Grace O'Connor with Michel's sniper rifle while being aided by Brera, who had broken free from Grace's control. As the Frontier fleet lands on the Vajra home planet, he ejects from his damaged VF-25 in his EX-Gear, giving the fighter a final salute as he fulfills his dream of flying in a real sky. He is last shown flying over Ranka and Sheryl at the Vajra planet.
As part of the 25th Anniversary Tribute, Alto is shown mimicking scenes from the previous Macross series:
- The scene where Alto saves Ranka for the first time is a nod to when Hikaru Ichijyo rescues Lynn Minmay.
- While controlling his VF-25 in slave mode, he uses the same flying hand motion as Isamu Alva Dyson.
- His salute to both girls in the final episode is a nod to a similar scene in The Super Dimension Fortress Macross: Do You Remember Love?.
- When his fighter is rising to the surface to be launched, that scene and the one in which Alto raises his head is very similar to those shown in the opening of the original Macross when Hikaru and his Valkyrie rise to the surface.
Sheryl Nome (シェリル・ノーム, Sheriru Nōmu)
Voiced by: Aya Endou, singing voice: May'n
- Age: 17
Known as the "Galactic Fairy", Sheryl Nome is a pop idol from Macross Galaxy fleet who constantly tops music charts, leading people to say that it was impossible not to hear her songs if you lived in this galaxy. As such, her popularity was soaring just as high in the Galaxy's sister fleet, Macross Frontier. Due to her beauty and singing talent, she is a very proud and self-assured person. Sheryl recognizes the singing talent of Ranka Lee and often offers to help her 'behind the scenes' to realize her dream of singing. Sheryl's first encounter with Alto Saotome occurs when he serves as a backup 'performer' at her first concert in Frontier. It is later revealed that Sheryl is apparently a failed experimental subject called Fairy 9 and is "discarded" by Grace O'Connor on Galia 4, the latter stating that she had outlived her usefulness. However, Sheryl survives and makes her way back to Frontier together with Michael in his VF-25G. Confronting Grace O'Connor for sabotaging her career, she is reminded that she used to be an anonymous and homeless orphan girl living in Galaxy's slums, where Grace picked her up for the Fairy 9 project. Grace also reveals that Sheryl is suffering from a terminal "V-Type" infection and will soon die in the absence of a cure. Crushed by the revelation, she almost quits singing altogether if not for Alto's encouragement and the desperation brought on by a vicious Vajra assault on Frontier. While Sheryl is singing for a charity concert, Luca Angelloni discovers that her infection gives her similar abilities to those of Ranka Lee in producing fold waves through her singing, albeit to a lesser extent. Leon's administration immediately seeks her help, instantly resurrecting her singing career for the final assault against the Vajra. A letter and photograph written by Mao Nome's daughter is found by Cathy Glass in the remains of the 117th Research and Exploration Fleet and confirms Sheryl Nome is in fact Dr. Mao Nome's biological granddaughter, her fold quartz earrings inherited from Mao. The series hints that her mother fell on hard times shortly after the death of her grandmother. During the final battle, Ranka Lee cures Sheryl's infection by sending the "V-Type" microbes from her brain into her abdomen, resulting in Sheryl having the same capability as Ranka to link up with the Vajra through singing. Sheryl joins Ranka in rallying the Vajra to side with the Frontier fleet and defeat Grace.
The prequel manga reveals that her parents were residents of the Macross Galaxy who were opposed to mandatory cybernetic implants by the government and were ordered to be either executed or captured by the authorities under the cause of treason. Her parents were both killed for their resistance and Sheryl spend a part of childhood living in poverty until she met Grace O'Connor, during that time she met Lylith Amagi, the daughter of the Amagi family who competed with the Saotome family as famous Kabuki actors, but was disowned after her father's second wife gave birth to a son. Like many disowned children of the aristocracy, Lylith was enrolled into Erato Academy, where she taught Sheryl that she must stop burdening her natural talent with feelings of sorrow as they affected her singing skills. During a major audition for the lead role in an upcoming musical, Sheryl's singing abilities attracts Vajra, which Grace took a notice to. Lylith sacrificed herself to save Sheryl, telling Sheryl that her songs must convey feelings to others; Sheryl promises to Lylith and her parents that she will be the best singer in the galaxy. During her time as a student in Erato, Sheryl unwittingly met Alto Saotome as a Kabuki actor on stage, making their destiny entwined since then.
Ranka Lee (ランカ・リー, Ranka Rī)
Voiced by: Megumi Nakajima
- Age: 16
Known as the "Super-Dimension Cinderella" (超時空シンデレラ, Chōjikū Shinderera), Ranka is a petite, lively and cheerful (although naive) teenage girl with green hair. She suffers from post-traumatic stress syndrome as a result from witnessing the destruction of the 117th Long Distance Research Fleet in which her biological family perished. She is one-quarter Zentradi, which gives her the ability to have her hair move on its own according to her feelings, as well as an above-average resistance to the vacuum of space. As the adopted younger sister of S.M.S. ace Ozma Lee, she initially attends an all-girl's high school at the urging of her brother while working part-time at the Chinese restaurant "Nyan-Nyan". She later transfers to the Mihoshi Academy to facilitate her singing career after being discovered at the Miss Macross contest and the "Bird Human" movie where she plays the role of Mao Nome. Ranka starts off as a huge fan of Sheryl Nome as she has loved singing since childhood and had dreamt of becoming a singer. She has a crush on Alto Saotome, especially after being rescued by him when the Vajra first attacked the Macross Frontier fleet. It is revealed that she has a deep connection to the Vajra as her songs confuse them and she feels severe pain whenever large amounts of Vajra are killed in her vicinity; the exact nature of this ability is explained as the result of her mother's exposure to the "V-Type" infection during pregnancy. As such, Ranka is referred to as the "Little Queen" by Grace O'Connor, suggesting that her relation to the Vajra may be more than it seems. In episode 21, with her heart completely broken, she leaves the Macross Frontier fleet (along with her bodyguard Brera Sterne) while trying to deliver her Vajra pet "Ai-Kun" to the rest of its species. She and Brera eventually find the planet of origin of the Vajra. Ranka is captured by them just as she recalls her past and realizes that Brera is her biological brother. While being held on the Vajra planet, she realizes that everything that happened to the 117th fleet resulted because her singing attracted the Vajra. Using Ranka's self-perceived blame for the incident, Grace O'Connor manipulates Ranka into compromising the Vajra fold communication network, allowing Grace to send the Vajra against the incoming Macross Frontier fleet during their final battle. However, with the help of Alto, Sheryl, and Brera, she manages to break free from Grace's influence and rallies the Vajra to side with the Frontier fleet to defeat Grace. In the last episode Ranka saves the life of Sheryl from the "V-type" microbes that she had, sending from her brain into her abdomen. In the final scene, she is seen welcoming Alto to the Vajra's home planet, as he flies over to her and Sheryl.
Ranka shares many characteristics with Lynn Minmay of the original Macross series. Both characters started out working in a Chinese restaurant and both participated in a local beauty pageant (with the exception that Minmay won the Miss Macross pageant while Ranka finished as a runner-up in the Miss Macross Frontier pageant).

== Mihoshi Academy ==
Michael Blanc (ミハエル・ブラン, Mihaeru Buran)
Voiced by: Hiroshi Kamiya
Alto's Human classmate and friendly rival who wears corrective glasses. He is an excellent marksman, and his motto is to always acquire his targets, be it an enemy or a woman—maintaining his reputation as a considerable ladies' man. He is the originator of Alto's nickname, "Alto-hime" (Princess Alto). Aside from leading a normal school life, he is also the 2nd Lieutenant of the S.M.S. Skull Platoon and pilots a blue VF-25G (gunner/sniper version). He initially expresses doubt over Alto joining the Skull Platoon, but later accepts him.
Michael is also one of the most observant characters, noticing the love triangle between Alto, Ranka, and Sheryl as well as catching on to Grace's insidious plot behind the scenes. He is a childhood friend of Klan Klang and have liked her for a long time, although it is not clear whether he knows that their feelings are mutual. He chose to hide his feelings regardless, since he believes that as a soldier who always has to put his life on the line, confessing such feelings would only bring pain. He nonetheless reciprocated after Klan eventually confessed to him, only to be stabbed by a stage 2 Vajra later while saving her from a Vajra assault in the S.M.S. micronization/macronization chamber, after which his body is sucked into space via a hole and is never found. His VF-25G is eventually piloted by a micronized Klan, and its sniper rifle is used by Alto to destroy Grace, thus ending the conflict with the Vajra.
Due to translation inconsistency, his first name is translated as either Michel or Mikhail.
Luca Angelloni (ルカ・アンジェローニ, Ruka Anjerōni)
Voiced by: Jun Fukuyama
Alto and Michael's junior classmate. He is often frustrated with his seniors, who like to give him a hard time. He is a genius with computers and military electronics. As with Michael, he is a member of the S.M.S. Skull Platoon. He pilots a green RVF-25 (reconnaissance version). His fighter is custodied by three pet Ghost Drones (which he calls Shimon, Johanne, and Petero, or Simon, John, and Peter) that respond to his verbal commands. He is also the heir to the L.A.I. corporation, which means he has access to exotic, prototype technologies and is somewhat involved in Grace and Leon's plans. It is also strongly hinted that he has a crush on his classmate Nanase Matsuura.
After Nanase is injured and Michael is killed due to the Vajra attack inside the Frontier, Luca, together with Alto, joins the New U.N. Spacy as part of the 4th Fighter Wing and vows to destroy the Vajra. He flies the new Recon version of the VF-171EX until the final battle with the Vajra, when he switches to his original RVF-25 and with Klan Klang tows Alto's VF-25 to him. During the final battle, Luca disengages the A.I. limiters on his Ghost drones to counter Macross Galaxy's V-9 Ghost attack drones. While the drones are eventually destroyed, they succeed in covering Alto to complete the mission. After the fleet lands on the Vajra homeworld, he is seen rushing to Nanase Matsuura bedside as she awakens from her injuries.
Nanase Matsuura (松浦 ナナセ, Matsuura Nanase)
Voiced by: Hōko Kuwashima
Another classmate of Alto, Michael, and Luca, Nanase is also Ranka Lee's friend. A shy, quiet and voluptuous girl with glasses, she also works in the same "Nyan-Nyan" restaurant as Ranka and supports her dream of becoming a singer. Nanase is a skilled artist and was hired by Grace to become Ranka's costume designer. She is severely wounded in her right eye and other parts of her body during a Vajra attack inside Macross Frontier. Sheryl Nome takes her into a shelter for medical attention, thus saving her life. However, due to the injuries she goes into a coma and did not reawaken until the Frontier fleet lands on the Vajra homeworld.

== Private Military Provider S.M.S. (Strategic Military Services) ==
Ozma Lee (オズマ・リー, Ozuma Rī)
Voiced by: Katsuyuki Konishi
The middle-aged top ace in the S.M.S. private military company and leader of Skull Platoon, he holds the rank of Major and is an experienced former N.U.N.S. pilot. He is an avid fan of Fire Bomber and often plays their songs in his car or while at home, and also names Skull Platoon's battle formations after their songs (i.e., "Planet Dance", "Totsugeki Love Heart"). Although laid-back, short-tempered, and careless on the outside, he knows when to be serious, and believes that the real duty of a soldier is to care for his subordinates and civilians, thus making him more reliable than he actually looks. He is somewhat overprotective of his "sister" (legally, his adopted daughter) Ranka Lee, and lies to her about his work so she will not worry about him, telling her he has a desk job in a company's personnel department. He is actually unrelated to Ranka by blood and is only her adopted brother, constantly blaming himself for failing to protect her family during a Vajra attack on the 117th Large Scale Research Fleet eleven years ago. He also had a prior romantic relationship with NUNS 2nd Lt. Catherine "Cathy" Glass sometime in the past, which makes their current working relationship on Macross Quarter a little tense at times. Like Cathy Glass, Ozma had grown suspicious of Leon Mishima's intentions and confronted him only to be arrested by his men. However, he and Cathy escape and find the body of president Howard Glass after Leon had him killed inside Battle Frontier. He and Cathy are found by Bobby and return to the Macross Quarter to tell the truth about Howard Glass' death. Ozma learns that Ranka has left the Frontier fleet to recover her memories and decides that he must also choose his own path. When S.M.S. resorts to piracy and separates from the Frontier fleet in the Macross Quarter, Ozma battles Alto and, before joining the Macross Quarter in its fold jump, tells Alto (whom he has many misgiving due to Alto's at-times rebellious piloting behavior) that he has improved and reminds him to choose his own path. He was one of the primary investigators at Galia 4, where the Macross Quarter uncovers the truth behind the Vajra and the corrupted factions in both the Galaxy and Frontier fleets. After Macross Quarter rendezvous with the Frontier fleet during the final battle, he joins the fray and fires nuclear missiles at Grace. However, the missiles prove ineffective against Grace, who having compromised the Vajra queen now wields an impenetrable super-dimension energy shield. Eventually he manages to cover Alto so he can kill Grace. In the closing scene, he is seen to be back with Cathy as the Frontier fleet settles on the Vajra home planet. He drives a Lancia Delta.
Ozma Lee shares many characteristics with Roy Focker from the original Macross series. In episode 17, Ozma is seriously wounded after a fierce battle with the Vajra, but conceals his wounds while watching Ranka's debut concert with Cathy until he loses consciousness from severe blood loss. However, unlike Focker, who died in episode 18 of the original series due to a similar injury, Ozma is rushed to the hospital, where he survives. Both characters even make references to pineapple-based desserts in their situations (salad for Focker; cake for Ozma).
Canaria Berstein (カナリア・ベルシュタイン, Kanaria Berushutain)
Voiced by: Hōko Kuwashima
The middle-aged First lieutenant in the S.M.S. and the pilot of Skull Team's VB-6 König Monster variable bomber. Although she rarely speaks, when she does her words have great weight and she often advises Ozma. Canaria also serves as a military medic for S.M.S. She is married and has a young son named Eddie. Canaria leaves them at Frontier after departing with Ozma and the rest of the S.M.S. deserters. During the climactic battle against the Vajra she flies her VB-6 König Monster into the flight deck of Battle Galaxy and fires with the rail cannons and missiles at its bridge, blinding the enemy ship long enough for the Macross Quarter to destroy its Macross Cannon and enabling the Battle Frontier to destroy the Battle Galaxy ship by itself.
Klan Klang (クラン・クラン, Kuran Kuran)
Voiced by: Megumi Toyoguchi
A blue-haired, stern-looking, but well-endowed Zentradi female (Meltran) who is the commander of the all-female S.M.S. Pixie Platoon (which consists of herself and two subordinates). Klan has the rank of captain. Klan is a childhood friend of Michael Blanc and harbors a crush on him that does not seem to be reciprocated. She is an ace Queadluun-Reapower-armor pilot. Due to a genetic anomaly when she is micronized she physically appears to be a child. This makes her the perfect target for Michael's mockery. In episode 20 Diamond Crevasse Klan finally reveals her love to Michael in the heat of battle, only to watch helplessly from the macronization chamber as he is mortally wounded trying to protect her. Michael's last words are a declaration of his love for her and an apology for waiting to tell her until it was too late. When the Macross Quarter deserts the Frontier fleet, Klan is one of those who stay behind, saluting the ship as it launches past her. During the final battle, her Quaedluun-Rea is critically damaged by Brera Sterne, but she springs back into action in Michael's VF-25G while in micronized form, trumping her sniping skills. In the climactic confrontation with Grace, her VF is damaged while covering Alto, so she entrusts him with Michael's sniper rifle. Alto uses the weapon to deliver the kill shot at Grace.
Nene Rora (ネネ・ローラ, Nene Rōra)
Voiced by: Aya Hirano
A tall (by Zentradi standards) pink-haired Meltran who is part of the all-female S.M.S. Pixie Platoon. A calm, gentle and kind character.
Lalamia Lelenia (ララミア・レレニア, Raramia Rerenia)
A red-haired boyish-looking Meltran with an intense gaze who is part of the all-female S.M.S. Pixie Platoon. She never spoke once during the entire series and was never seen again after her Queadluun-Rea power-armor received a direct hit during battle with the Vajra in Episode 14, presumed to be killed in action.
Jeffrey Wilder (ジェフリー・ワイルダー, Jefurī Wairudā)
Voiced by: Tōru Ōkawa
Captain of SMS Macross Quarter, and S.M.S.'s de facto field commander. A colonel in the S.M.S. ranks, he used to be a pilot in an U.N. Forces aircraft carrier early on his career. A seasoned veteran, he has a beard and a horizontal scar across his face as proof of his previous combat experience. Though a very polite officer, he can become highly mischievous when the situation requires it. It is mentioned that he lost his wife some time ago. When he receives an order from Richard Bilrer that the S.M.S. would be disbanded and then reincorporated into the N.U.N.S. (just as he learned the truth regarding President Glass' death from Cathy and Ozma) Wilder declares that the S.M.S. are now pirates instead of soldiers and successfully convinces the other S.M.S. members (excluding Clan, Nene, Alto and Luca among some others) to join them. He then commands the Macross Quarter to detach itself from the Frontier and go into a fold jump. After he and his crew investigated the truth behind the Vajra attacks by reviewing the evidence from the wrecks of the 117th fleet, he realizes that Grace O'Connor plans to force humanity into becoming like the Vajra living in a linked mind network with O'Connor as its Queen. Now with knowledge of the truth behind the conflict Wilder filed a report to the government on Earth and took his ship to the Vajra home planet to help stop the conflict between humanity and the aliens. He also asks Monica Lange if she will stand with him when they go to confront Leon and the Vajra, showing that he knew her feelings for him and that he shared them too. Captain Wilder brings Macross Quarter back to the Vajra homeworld and presents evidence of Leon's involvement in the assassination of President Glass and his working with the true enemy, the co-conspirators from Macross Galaxy fleet. He and his crew are victorious in defending Battle Frontier. Both his ship and Battle Frontier confront Macross Galaxy's flagship, Battle Galaxy, and destroy it. He is later seen on the surface of the Vajra planet with the rest of the bridge crew and with Monica at his side.
Bobby Margot (ボビー・マルゴ, Bobī Marugo)
Voiced by: Kenta Miyake
Highly skilled helmsman of the S.M.S. mothership, SMS Macross Quarter. Somewhat stern in appearance, he is "just like a girl inside", as he often says. He was a hair stylist as well as a make-up artist, somewhere in the past. He is well liked by female crew members for his good understanding of others. He is an open homosexual and has not-so subtle feelings for Ozma, though he understands well that Ozma will never reciprocate and he is content with just having feelings for him. Apparently very effeminate, calm and soft-spoken when not fighting, he will become quite serious, daring and aggressive during combat, or when he needs to scare or threaten others.
Monica Lange (モニカ・ラング, Monika Rangu)
Voiced by: Rie Tanaka
One of the bridge operators of SMS Macross Quarter. In charge of the main search radar and chief of the main operator group, she has a serious leader personality type. It was revealed later that she is enamoured with Captain Wilder, who eventually reciprocated her feelings in episode 24.
Mina Roshan (ミーナ・ローシャン, Mīna Rōshan)
Voiced by: Aya Hirano
One of the bridge operators of SMS Macross Quarter. Currently in charge of internal warship status management. Despite having an IQ of 180, she sometimes has trouble adjusting to the pace of her fellow teammates and is proud of her high level of intelligence. Mina is also of Indian ancestry.
Ram Hoa (ラム・ホア, Ramu Hoa)
Voiced by: Kaori Fukuhara
One of the bridge operators of SMS Macross Quarter. In charge of communication and main weapons control. A woman of not too many words that tends to classify everything that she comes into contact on a regular basis.
Henry Gilliam (ヘンリー・ギリアム, Henrī Giriamu)
Voiced by: Takashi Ōhara
A tough pilot in the S.M.S. Skull Team and Ozma Lee's second in command. He lost his life in Episode 01 while defending the Macross Frontier fleet in the first Vajra attack of 2059. His VF-25 Messiah variable fighter is now piloted by Alto.
Richard Bilrer (リチャード・ビルラー, Richādo Birurā)
Voiced by: Tadashi Miyazawa
The mysterious macronized Zentradi owner of the S.M.S. Private Military Provider Company. Has multiple artificial implants in his body and some of them enable him to receive telephone calls directly into his left ear. As shown in Episodes 14 and 15, Bilrer is a model train otaku and dreams of connecting the whole galaxy using the mysterious fold quartz obtained from the Vajra. It was revealed during the final episode of the series that he has a picture of the long lost celebrity Lynn Minmay inside the fold quartz in his ring and that he intended to meet her again using the Vajra's fold communication network.
Anne
S.M.S. member who was killed by the Vajra during their assault into the S.M.S. macronization chambers in Episode 20. Alto and his friends find her body while escaping from the enemy.

== New United Nations Military ==
Catherine Glass (キャサリン・グラス, Kyasarin Gurasu)
Voiced by: Sanae Kobayashi
- Age: 23
A N.U.N.S. General Staff second lieutenant attached to the Macross Frontier, she is also the daughter of President Howard Glass. Both beautiful and intelligent, Catherine (or "Cathy" as she is commonly known) is revealed to be a former Miss Macross winner, and later goes on to serve on the judging panel in the 2059 contest. After having graduated from university with honors, she joined NUNS and is being fast-tracked into the elite. Though a very competent officer, she sometimes lacks flexibility. She has a relationship with Leon Mishima without her father's knowledge and was formerly in a relationship with Ozma Lee before that. Catherine becomes part of the SMS Macross Quarter crew during a mission to rescue the Macross Galaxy fleet from the Vajra. Like Ozma, she has grown suspicious of Leon's intentions and confronts him, only to be arrested by his men. However, she and Ozma escape and find the body of her father after Leon had him killed at the gangway of Battle Frontier. Later, they return to the Macross Quarter after being found by Bobby, and they tell everyone of the truth about President Glass's death. She later joins the Macross Quarter crew into exile to investigate the truth and participates in the final battle. During the course of events of her investigation, before and after the exile from Frontier, Cathy's feelings for Ozma return. When the Frontier fleet settles on the Vajra home planet, she is seen to be back at Ozma Lee's side looking on the new homeworld.
Howard Glass (ハワード・グラス, Hawādo Gurasu)
Voiced by: Tomomichi Nishimura
The fourth elected president of the New United Nations Government and also the administrative director of the Macross Frontier fleet. His administration was responsible for the creation of the Frontier colony fleet. As president, he shoulders all political decisions to ensure the security and well-being of his citizens. He is also Cathy's father. Glass dies in episode 20 after being gunned down (as well as his two personal bodyguards) en route to the Battle Frontier bridge by Leon Mishima's men.
Leon Mishima (レオン・三島, Reon Mishima)
Voiced by: Tomokazu Sugita
The President's aide and Chief of Staff. An ever calm and composed man, Mishima is President Glass' close associate. He is a savvy political operator and begins the series engaged to Cathy Glass. He knows far more about the Vajra than it seems and apparently is working in secret with Grace O'Connor. In episode 15, it is revealed that he also helped Grace to lure the Vajra to Frontier. He assigns Brera Sterne, a cyborg, as Ranka's personal bodyguard. Ozma and Cathy confront him on his planned coup d'état, but Mishima tells that them that they are too late as he already has a sniper targeting Glass. However, the sniper is killed during a Vajra attack, and Glass escapes. Eventually Mishima succeeds by personally ambushing and gunning down Glass inside Battle Frontier, which gives Leon total control of practically all N.U.N.S. forces in the Frontier fleet. After this, he becomes the fifth president of the Frontier government.
Mishima also double-crosses O'Connor by ordering her assassination, but she easily kills his men and escapes from Frontier. Later, Mishima reveals to Alto the findings about Vajra and surprises him by stating that Ranka is assisting the Vajra in destroying humanity. He also declares to Macross Frontier's population that they have only three months of oxygen left to sustain themselves and that the only way they can survive is to annihilate the Vajra and claim their planet as their new homeworld.
During the final battle with the Vajra, the Macross Quarter returns from exile and saves the Battle Frontier from a Vajra fleet attack. Then Captain Wilder reveals to N.U.N.S. officials that Mishima was behind the Vajra attacks as well as the murder of Glass, leading to his immediate arrest by his own guards.
Machida (マキー, Mashīda)
N.U.N.S. VF-171 pilot from the Macross Frontier fleet.
Captain Wilen (ウィラン大尉, Wiran-taii)
Voiced by: Daisuke Matsuo
N.U.N.S. pilot from the Macross Galaxy fleet. He reports to the Macross Frontier headquarters that his fleet is under attack by a large horde of Vajra.
Jessica Blanc (ジェシカ・ブラン, Jeshika Buran)
Michel Blanc's older sister and a friend of Klan. Jessica took care of Michel after their parents died and the two were very close. She was a N.U.N.S. pilot and a sniper. Jessica was court martialed after she accidentally shot and killed her superior officer Because Jessica was having an affair with the officer and the couple had just broken up she was found guilty. Some time later Jessica committed suicide.
Major Ohgotwhai
Macronized Zentradi leader of the N.U.N.S. 33rd Naval/Marine Fleet stationed in planet Galia 4. He and his forces help Alto fight rogue Commander Tehmzin's mutiny and rescue Sheryl. The character's name and design are very similar to those of Zentradi Commander Vrlitwhai from The Super Dimension Fortress Macross: Do You Remember Love? animated movie.
Major Ohgotwhai's advisor
Unnamed macronized Zentradi advisor of the N.U.N.S. 33rd Naval/Marine Fleet stationed in planet Galia 4. Dies during the "Dimension Eater" explosion when the Assault Module of the Queadol-Magdomilla Class Fleet Command Battleship is destroyed. The character's design is very similar to that of Zentradi advisor Exsedol Folmo from The Super Dimension Fortress Macross: Do You Remember Love? animated movie.
Tehmzin (テムジン, Temujin)
Voiced by: Jun Konno
Macronized Zentradi soldier of the N.U.N.S. 33rd Naval/Marine Fleet stationed in planet Galia 4. He is the leader of a rebel faction disgruntled with the peace between Zentradi and humans, and longs to reassert Zentradi dominance in the galaxy by war. Shortly after Sheryl's entourage lands on Galia 4, Tehmzin's faction takes the entire regiment and the entourage hostage when Sheryl falls ill. Alto Saotome defeats him in battle after the arrival of Michael and Ranka. The character's name and design were similar to those of Zentradi Commander Quamzin from The Super Dimension Fortress Macross TV series. However, the Japanese pronunciation is identical to the name Temujin, one of the titles of Genghis Khan.

== Others ==
Grace O'Connor (グレイス・オコナー, Gureisu Okonā)
Voiced by: Kikuko Inoue
The series' main antagonist, Grace O'Connor first appears as Sheryl's manager from the Galaxy Fleet and as a person with a gentle and calm attitude. She seems to often upset her employer despite having considerable abilities. O'Connor also has cybernetic implants that allow her to directly interface with any computer terminal. She also appears to be secretly working with the cyborg pilot Brera Sterne as his superior.
In the 13th episode, it is revealed that O'Connor is a cyborg as well, as she unleashes from her arm a series of conduits to activate a weapon of mass destruction called a "Dimension Eater." She apparently perishes in the ensuing fold dislocation, calmly wishing everyone from the Macross Frontier fleet good luck before the Dimension Eater engulfs her and then almost half of the planet of Galia IV, triggering a large scale Vajra attack on the Frontier fleet in the process and destroying the N.U.N.S. 33rd Naval/Marine fleet base on the planet surface. It is revealed later that O'Connor uploaded her mind into another cyborg body. Returning to Macross Frontier, she picks up Ranka and becomes her manager.
Back in 2047, O'Connor was a scientist in the 117th Long Distance Research Fleet and worked in Dr. Mao Nome's team, surviving the destruction of the fleet during the Vajra attack a year later. It is believed she is chief suspect of causing the destruction of the fleet. In 2053, she continued the research on the V-Type infection in Galaxy Fleet, using Sheryl Nome as the test subject and manufacturing Sheryl's entire idol status for her purposes.
O'Connor is later betrayed by Leon Mishima, who orders her assassination, but she single-handedly kills Mishima's men and escapes from Frontier in her own VF-27 variable fighter. She eventually rendezvous with Brera and reveals to him that Ranka is his sister, but immediately activates his slave mode forcing him to follow her orders. Afterward, she discovers the location of the main Vajra Queen and merges her cybernetic body with it. Eventually she manages to compromise the Vajra fold communication network by manipulating Ranka and sending the Vajra against the Macross Frontier fleet during their final battle.
O'Connor and her cyberlinked fellow conspirators from Galaxy fleet merge with the Vajra network, gaining total control over them, while she declares that they do not need "Little Queen" Ranka anymore, as they feel the power of controlling the Vajra's galactic scale "Body". Her ultimate plan was to kill all the humans who would not submit to her and have fold crystals embedded in the others so they could be completely under her control, since nothing in the N.U.N.S. arsenal would have been able to withstand the might of the Vajra's spacetime capabilities in a galactic scale conquest.
She becomes power-mad once fully linked to the network and declares war against anyone who opposes her, sending mind-controlled Vajra war fleets to Human/Zentradi colony fleets and even to Macross City on Earth. In the end, Ranka and Sheryl's songs release the Vajra from her control and she is soundly defeated by the combined Vajra, S.M.S., and Macross Frontier fleet forces. O'Connor is killed by Alto with Michel's VF-25G sniper rifle.
Brera Sterne (ブレラ・スターン, Burera Sutān)
Voiced by: Sōichirō Hoshi
- Age: 19
Born as Brera Mei (ブレラ・メイ, Burera Mei), he is the mysterious pilot of the crimson VF-27 variable fighter that Alto Saotome encounters for the first time inside a Vajra carrier. Brera seems to know how to play the first part of Ranka's song "Aimo" using his harmonica, claiming that the song is the only fragment of his past he still has after memory modification. After saving Ranka from a wild beast attack, the injuries Brera sustains reveal that he is also a cyborg. He harbors a great deal of concern for Ranka's well-being, but does not exactly know why. A picture discovered by Alto inside the Macross Class SDF Global reveals that Brera had some kind of connection to Ranka before becoming a cyborg.
It is eventually revealed that he is a Major in the Galaxy Fleet Antares Platoon. He becomes Ranka's bodyguard and also likes to listen to her songs, describing the feeling he gets from her songs as being enveloped in a universe that accepts him instead of rejecting him. Brera assists Ranka into delivering her stage 2 Vajra pet "Ai-kun" to the rest of its species. Some time later, he and Ranka find the planet of origin of the Vajra. Grace O'Connor reveals to Brera that Ranka is his younger sister, but then she activates his slave mode, forcing him to follow her orders. During the final battle, O'Connor makes Brera help the Vajra by destroying Alto's VF-171EX. The explosion of a Vajra carrier nearby shatters Brera's slave circuit implant, thus freeing him from O'Connor's control. He proceeds to encourage Ranka to fight O'Connor's influence and eventually teams up with Alto and covers him while Alto kills O'Connor in the end.
Ai-kun (あい君/アイ君, Ai-kun)
A cute-looking animal who first appears from out of nowhere at the Formo Mall while Ranka is promoting her debut album, and then at Mihoshi Academy, running away from Sheryl and the rest of the school after having wrapped itself in Sheryl's panties. It is later on adopted by Ranka, who first discovers it at Griffith Park in Frontier City. Because it is illegal to keep unknown animals from newly contacted planets as pets (in cases where they may bear pathogens, or disrupt the delicate ecological balance of a colony ship), Ranka keeps Ai-kun in secrecy. One day, prior to Ranka's debut concert, Ai-kun disappears, and Ranka has her friend Nanase look for it. Asking for assistance, Nanase shows Luca an illustration of Ai-kun, which he later on identifies as a Vajra larvae. During the concert, Ai-kun undergoes a transformation and upon reuniting with Ranka, molts into a stage 2 Vajra. Ranka and Brera take Ai-kun and leave Island 1 to deliver it to the Vajra home planet.
Ranzou Saotome (早乙女 嵐蔵, Saotome Ranzō)
Voiced by: Kenta Miyake
Alto's father and the 18th sōke of the Saotome family of. A very strict man, he has trained his son harshly in the art of kabuki since youth which has resulted in their current estranged relationship. However, after a close brush with death, Ranzou is willing to make amends with Alto and officially name him successor to the Saotome family.
Miyo Saotome (早乙女 美代, Saotome Miyo)
Alto's mother, who died when Alto was twelve. A considerable beauty, Alto inherited her good looks and has a strong resemblance to her. She often spoke of flying in the sky, which inspired Alto to become a pilot for the sake of flying in a true sky.
Yasaburou Saotome (早乙女 矢三郎, Saotome Yasaburō)
Voiced by: Hirofumi Nojima
A senior apprentice to Alto's father, Alto regards Yasaburou as his older brother since he is a student of the Saotome family, though he is not a blood relation. Despite his mild-mannered and kind appearance, he is a stubborn and persistent person, making multiple attempts to convince Alto to return to his father and become the rightful heir to the Saotome family. While he is talented kabuki actor and seen as the potential successor to Ranzou, Yasaburou feels that Alto is denying his talent as a kabuki actor and is running away from his true calling, believing that Alto is only going through a phase as a pilot and will inevitably return to kabuki.
Elmo Kridanik (エルモ・クリダニク, Erumo Kuridaniku)
Voiced by: Tōru Ōkawa
The micronized Zentradi president and manager of the small talent agency "Vector Productions". He hears Ranka's singing by chance and scouts her, becoming her manager. However, after Leon Mishima realizes that Ranka's singing has an effect on the Vajra he assigns Grace O'Connor as her new manager, forcing Elmo away from her. He is seen taking shelter in the same bunker as Sheryl and watching her sing during a Vajra attack. Elmo becomes Sheryl's new manager some time later. A comment made by him when asking Ozma Lee's permission to become Ranka's manager suggests that he is a Space War I veteran.
George Yamamori (ジョージ・山森, Jōji Yamamori)
Voiced by: Tōru Ōkawa
The director of the Bird Human film, who gave Ranka the part of Mao Nome after the original actress was wounded during a car accident caused by a wild beast attack. This launches Ranka's musical career into stardom. Yamamori's physical appearance was based on that of series director and creator Shoji Kawamori, and his name is also a phonetic play on the director's name as well.
Miranda Merin (ミランダ・メリン, Miranda Merin)
Voiced by: Rie Tanaka
The self-conceited winner of the current Miss Macross Frontier contest, Miranda plays Mayan priestess Sara Nome in the recent Bird Human film. She appears to be a descendant of (as she shares her last name with) a similarly conceited character (Jamis Merin/ジャミス・メリン) from the original Macross TV series, who also competed in the first Miss Macross contest.

Dr. Mao Nome (Dr. マオ・ノーム, Dokutā Mao Nōmu)
The Mayan sister of Sara Nome, who was also involved in the events of Macross Zero. Ozma Lee apparently knew her. In 2047, she was a scientist with a background researching Protoculture Civilization. "Dr. Mao" (as she is referred to the series) headed a project on board the 117th Long Distance Research Fleet to manage and prevent a Vajra-related disease (the V-Type infection) with Grace O'Connor and Ranshe Mei as her assistants. Dr. Mao is eventually revealed to have a granddaughter, who inherited her fold quartz earrings: Sheryl Nome. She is presumed to have been killed during the destruction of the 117th fleet by the Vajra.
Ranshe Mei (蘭雪 美, Ranshe Mei; pinyin: Lánxuě Měi)
Voiced by: Maaya Sakamoto
Ranka Lee and Brera Sterne's mother, who was a leading scientist in the 117th Long Distance Research Fleet and worked in Dr. Mao's team in 2047. Ranshe was strongly opposed to O'Connor's plan to sacrifice the Vajra in order to control their fold communication network. She later appeared to Ranka in a vision when she was held captive inside a Vajra mothership. Like Sheryl Nome, Ranshe was also infected with the "V-Type" infection; since Ranka was conceived and carried to term while her mother was infected, Ranka was born with permanent immunity to the otherwise lethal infection. Ranshe is presumed to have been killed during the destruction of the 117th fleet by the Vajra.
