= List of Kämpfer episodes =

Kämpfer is a 14-episode Japanese anime series by Nomad, based on the series of light novels written by Toshihiko Tsukiji. The series follows a boy named Natsuru Senō, who is chosen to participate in the Kämpfer battles, giving him the ability to transform into a girl. The anime series aired on TBS between October 2 and December 17, 2009. The opening theme was "Unreal Paradise" (あんりある♥パラダイス, Anriaru Paradaisu) by Minami Kuribayashi, while the ending theme is "One Way Ryō Omoi" (ワンウェイ両想い, Wan Wei Ryō Omoi) by Marina Inoue and Megumi Nakajima. The series has been licensed for release in North America by Sentai Filmworks and was released in a complete collection by Section23 Films on January 18, 2011. Two additional episodes, titled Kämpfer für die Liebe, were released on Blu-ray Disc and DVD on May 25, 2011, with one of the episodes also airing on April 8, 2011. The opening theme is "Choose my love!" by Minami Kuribayashi while the ending theme is "Battle Girl A" (妄想少女A, Musō Shōjo A) by Yui Horie and Yukari Tamura.

== Episode list ==
=== Kämpfer (2009) ===
No.	Title	Directed by	Written by	Original release date
1	"Destiny ～The Chosen Ones～"; Transliteration: "Schicksal ～Erabareshimono～" (Japanese: Schicksal ～選ばれし者～)	Mitsue Yamazaki	Kazuyuki Fudeyasu	October 2, 2009
Natsuru Senō wakes up to discover one morning that he has transformed into a woman, upon which a stuffed animal tiger, Disemboweled Tiger, who introduces itself as a messenger, tells him that he has become a Kämpfer, which must do battle with other Kämpfer; since Kämpfer must be female, Natsuru transforms into a female version of himself. The next morning he is attacked by another Kämpfer named Akane Mishima wielding a sidearm. Natsuru protects his friend Kaede Sakura from Akane's attack, before saving Akane from a falling lamppost. Natsuru is approached the following day by a shy girl who reveals herself to be Akane, who is completely different in appearance and personality when in Kämpfer form. Akane tells Natsuru as much as she knows about the Kämpfer, even helping him when he transforms. Apparently, they are allies due to their bracelets being the same color, blue, hence they become known as Blue Kämpfer and that their enemies are the Red Kämpfer, who have red bracelets, accordingly. At the end of the day, Kaede tells Natsuru that she has fallen for his Kämpfer form. The next day, when he goes to Akane for advice, they are attacked by another hidden Kämpfer while in the school library. When Kaede suddenly appears in the wreckage, Akane assumes she is the enemy and shoots her gun at her.
2	"Glow ～The Fight of Death Starts～"; Transliteration: "Glühen ～Shitō no Kaimaku～" (Japanese: Glühen ～死闘の開幕～)	Directed by : Hikaru Sato; Storyboarded by : Yuta Takamura	Kazuyuki Fudeyasu	October 9, 2009
Natsuru stops Akane from shooting Kaede and the attacker escapes when the bell for class rings. Natsuru realizes that the enemy also goes to his school and becomes wary of the danger and cautious of the other girls around him. He and Akane are interrogated by Shizuku Sangō, the student council president, about what happened in the library. Natsuru promises to let Kaede meet his Kämpfer form the next day, and Akane and their messengers suggest making Kaede hate Natsuru's Kämpfer form, but instead she asks him out. Natsuru discovers Shizuku to be the enemy Kämpfer. Natsuru and Akane have trouble fighting against her, but eventually manage to stop her. Natsuru makes a deal with Shizuku to let her live if she leaves Kaede alone. Noticing rumors about Kämpfer Natsuru being spotted, Shizuku enrolls him into the girl's side of the school.
3	"Lily ~～The Secret Flower Garden～"; Transliteration: "Lilie ～Himitsu no Hanazono～" (Japanese: Lilie ～秘密の花園～)	Directed by : Satoshi Saga; Storyboarded by : Nagisa Miyazaki	Hiroko Fukuda	October 16, 2009
Natsuru begins his first day in the girls side of the school where he is transferred into Akane's class and is very popular among the girls. Kaede confesses her love to Natsuru, but he is unable to answer due to his bracelet flashing. He gets interviewed by the newspaper club, who write a dubious article about him. Kaede refutes most of the rumors and things go well until Shizuku starts spreading a rumor that female Natsuru is dating the male one. Natsuru escapes to the library and transforms back to his male form, only to have Akane reprimand and trip onto him. When Kaede catches sight of the compromising position, she turns against him and vows to compete to win Kämpfer Natsuru's love.
4	"Declaration of War ～The Fighting Maidens～"; Transliteration: "Kriegserklärung ～Tatakau Otometachi～" (Japanese: Kriegserklärung ～戦う乙女たち～)	Directed by : Matsuo Asami; Storyboarded by : Katsuyuki Kodera	Takashi Aoshima	October 22, 2009
As the cultural festival comes up, Natsuru is shocked to find that Shizuku has entered him into the Miss Seitetsu beauty contest. Natsuru gives Shizuku a shoulder massage in order to be replaced, but after Akane bursts firing her gun, the deal falls apart and Natsuru is still forced to compete. Deciding to go with a karaoke act, he (in Kämpfer form) and Akane go shopping for lingerie, though it gets out of hand when Shizuku decides to help out too. Kaede later joins them at the karaoke bar, where she, Akane and Shizuku compete for the chance to sing a duet with Natsuru. Kaede tries to force an answer to her confession from Natsuru, but he is unable to reply due to nearly transforming again (back to male form). Akane argues with Kaede for trying to confess behind her back, and both of them, as well as Shizuku, decide to enter the beauty contest too, much to the shock and chagrin of Natsuru.
5	"Comedy ～First Kiss～"; Transliteration: "Komödie ～Fāsuto Kisu～" (Japanese: Komödie ～ファーストキス～)	Directed by : Jiro Asuka; Storyboarded by : Nagisa Miyazaki	Takashi Aoshima	October 29, 2009
The cultural festival is about to begin and the class dress Natsuru and Akane in various costumes for the Miss Seitetsu beauty contest. In the changing room, Kaede interrupts the two of them and once again gets into an argument with Akane. Male Natsuru later meets up with Kaede, and gives her some encouragement, although she still considers him a rival. On the day of the beauty contest, Natsuru does not have an act, but then Kaede comes on performing a skit, throwing a bouquet into the audience. The two of them almost kiss, but are interrupted by Akane in her Kämpfer form, who starts shooting at them. Shizuku then appears and knocks everyone else unconscious, winning the contest by default. After the contest, Natsuru awakes in his male form and his first kiss is stolen by Shizuku. Meanwhile, Natsuru's childhood friend, Mikoto Kondō, who had caught Sakura's bouquet, finds the messenger, Strangled Stray Dog, inside it.
6	"Homecoming ～Friend or Foe?～"; Transliteration: "Heimkehr ～Teki ka Mikata ka～" (Japanese: Heimkehr ～敵か味方か～)	Directed by : Hisatoshi Shimizu; Storyboarded by : Mitsue Yamazaki	Hiroko Fukuda	November 5, 2009
Natsuru is surprised to find his childhood friend Mikoto has returned. When Kämpfer Natsuru heads to school, she is forced to participate in a 'quasi-maid café'. She is later accompanied by Shizuku, who warns her that a new Kämpfer will be coming. Kaede later joins them, and Shizuku subtly probes her to see if she has any knowledge concerning the Kämpfer and the Entrails Animals that spawn them. Kaede asks Natsuru for a kiss, but she declines and settles for a date around the festival instead. As they enter into a haunted house, Natsuru is attacked by a new Red Kämpfer, whom Natsuru eventually recognizes as Mikoto. Akane later intervenes and the fight is stopped by Shizuku, who asks Natsuru and Akane to reveal their true identities to her. After everyone gets on the same level, Shizuku agrees on a truce, as she wants to find out something. As Natsuru apologizes to Kaede for abandoning her, Kaede asks her to spend the night at her house.
7	"Invitation ～The Uninvited Guests～"; Transliteration: "Einladen ～Manekarezaru Kyakutachi～" (Japanese: Einladen ～招かれざる客たち～)	Directed by : Matsuo Asami; Storyboarded by : Hiroyuki Shimazu	Hiroko Fukuda	November 12, 2009
Natsuru, unexpectedly accompanied by Akane and Shizuku, arrives at Kaede's house, which has a lot of Entrails Animals. Kaede starts things off with a game involving two people biting through the ends of a Pocky stick. Akane's attempts at avoiding Kaede and Natsuru being paired together gets her stuck with Shizuku. In the second round, Akane pairs with Natsuru, but he breaks the stick before she can reach. After failing to get paired with Natsuru, Kaede ends the game and shows everyone her collection of Entrails Animals, including a prototype, Burnt Alive Lion. Mikoto then appears, bringing with her some curry which Shizuku dumps on Natsuru's face as an excuse for her to take a shower. Natsuru is forced to bathe in his female form since Kaede keeps peeking in. As Natsuru tries to go to sleep, he accidentally transforms back into his male form just as Kaede sneaks into his bed. Before Kaede notices him, Akane appears in her Kämpfer form wanting to convey her feelings to Natsuru. Just then, they are attacked by a White Kämpfer, Rika Ueda, who retreats after Shizuku intervenes. Later on, Shizuku wonders if she's jealous over Natsuru.
8	"Sweetheart ～The First Date～"; Transliteration: "Liebste ～Hajimete no Dēto～" (Japanese: Liebste ～初めてのデート～)	Directed by : Yoshitaka Nagaoka; Storyboarded by : Takashi Uchida	Kazuyuki Fudeyasu	November 19, 2009
Shizuku asks Male Natsuru to go out on a date with her. While Shizuku is generally insistent that it's a proper date, Natsuru just goes along with it thinking it is a plan to draw out the White Kämpfer. After visiting an aquarium and having a picnic, Shizuku questions Natsuru about why he likes Kaede. Hesitating to ask if he suspects a connection between Kaede and the Moderators, she then talks about the Kämpfer battle, remembering a lost ally. Natsuru has a quick nap with a curious dream, only to wake up on Shizuku's lap, curious as to whether she tried anything while he was asleep. At the end of the date, Mikoto spots them, and is not too happy about Natsuru going a date with Shizuku, not helped by Shizuku's honest comments. Akane then comes around his house having heard from Mikoto and asks him what type of girls, beside Kaede, he would like. When Natsuru casually mentions 'someone like Akane', she transforms and gets him to make an oath and go on a date with her.
9	"Midsummer ～Tropical Depression of Love～"; Transliteration: "Hochsommer ～Koi no Nettaiteikiatsu～" (Japanese: Hochsommer ～恋の熱帯低気圧～)	Toshihiro Kikuchi	Takashi Aoshima	November 26, 2009
Akane is having a romantic summer date with male Natsuru at the pool. However, Mikoto, Shizuku and Kaede show up as well. At the pool, Shizuku sees 3 White Kämpfers when they walked past Kaede. Shizuku sends female Natsuru to walk alone somewhere and is attacked and surrounded by a group of White Kämpfer, who introduce themselves as Sayaka Nakao, Ryōka Yamakawa and Hitomi Minagawa. Akane and Shizuku rescue Natsuru and to his dismay, Shizuku essentially says Natsuru was used as bait to get the White Kämpfer to reveal themselves, who end up running away rather than fight them on equal terms. Later male Natsuru and the girls are having a fun time in the hotel. Akane and Mikoto are in shock that Natsuru went on a date with Shizuku, and Shizuku even goes so far as to kiss Natsuru in front of the others. Kaede then asks male Natsuru to come with her outside the room. Natsuru, captivated by Kaede's sudden action, obliges without a second thought. Outside the room, Kaede manipulates the spellbound Natsuru into obeying her and they go outside to see the fireworks.
10	"Trap ～A Summer Experience～"; Transliteration: "Falle ～Hitonatsu no Keiken～" (Japanese: Falle ～ひと夏の経験～)	Mitsue Yamazaki	Takashi Aoshima	December 3, 2009
Natsuru finds himself sitting next to Kaede outside the hotel, who hypnotizes him into making Shizuku his. Kaede then disappears when Natsuru, who can't remember anything after leaving the room, is found and confronted by Akane, Shizuku and Mikoto in their respective Kämpfer forms. They return to the hotel where they are greeted by Kaede who doesn't appear to recall seeing the fireworks with Natsuru either. Afterwards, they all go (with Natsuru in female form) to the women's baths, where Natsuru's hypnotism kicks in and he then brings Shizuku back to the room to make a move on her, but he gets knocked out when he let slip that Kaede told him to do it. It is also revealed in a scene that Kaede appears to be in command of the White Kämpfer. The next day, Kaede whispers something in Shizuku's ear, confirming her suspicions.
11	"Choice ～Ode to Joy～"; Transliteration: "Wählen ～Kanki no Uta～" (Japanese: Wählen ～歓喜の歌～)	Directed by : Akane Inoue; Storyboarded by : Junichi Sakata	Kazuyuki Fudeyasu	December 10, 2009
Shizuku invites Natsuru over to her house to tell her about Kaede, getting Kaede's Burnt To Death Lion to spill the beans about the Kämpfer system. She recalls that her close friend Tamiko was killed in a Kämpfer battle and has since sworn vengeance against whoever responsible for the establishment of Kämpfer combat. When Natsuru confronts Kaede about this, he once again falls under Kaede's hypnotism. With Natsuru under her control, Kaede and the White Kämpfer trap and capture Shizuku, Akane and Mikoto. When the three of them wake up later chained together, Kaede tries to get Natsuru to finish them herself, but he spots a keychain he previously bought for Shizuku and snaps out of it, declaring that he will not betray his friends despite his love for Kaede. This declaration encourages Shizuku, Akane, and Mikoto to fight with renewed resolve, enabling them to break free and allowing them to easily defeat the White Kämpfer. Kaede tries enticing Natsuru once again, but he transforms back into normal form, putting himself out of the fight (and out of Kaede's disposal) as well as forcing Kaede and the White Kämpfer into retreat. With the battle over, Shizuku, Akane and Mikoto turn their attention to Natsuru, initially jumping him for trying to make out with Kaede in front of them before competing against each other to see who can appeal to Natsuru best with their "qualities" (to the point of kissing him, grabbing his hands and forcing him to touch sensitive areas, and rubbing their breasts onto him).
12	"Christmas ～The Miracle of the Entrails Dolls～"; Transliteration: "Weihnachten ～Zōmotsutachi no Kiseki～" (Japanese: Weihnachten～臓物たちの奇跡～)	Directed by : Seiji Masuda; Storyboarded by : Takehiro Nakayama	Hiroko Fukuda	December 17, 2009
Natsuru wakes up on Christmas Eve morning to find out that he and his messenger, Disemboweled Tiger, have swapped bodies! Disemboweled Tiger decides to head on outside to enjoy this occasion and sees Natsuru's friends Mikoto, Shizuku, and Akane on the streets only to notice that they've also been body swapped with their respective messengers, namely Strangled Stray Dog, Electrocuted Wildcat and Black Seppuku Rabbit, as well. The messengers have fun with their new bodies until they are caught sneaking out on a food bill and are forced to perform in a show. Kaede then encounters them and takes them to an amusement park, where they begin to get aroused and play erotic games with her. Kaede goes to a church to confess the sin of committing indecent acts with multiple girls all at once, but she just ends up being punished by the student council (who also happen to be working there). The messengers come to save her, but end up fighting each other instead when they discover (to their delight) that they can feel pain. After saying their goodbyes to Kaede, they ride off on a sleigh, the whole thing being a bizarre Christmas story.

=== Kämpfer für die Liebe (2011) ===
No.	Title	Directed by	Written by	Original release date
OVA–13	"Temptation ～Stealing Ahead～"; Transliteration: "Versuchung ~ nukegake" (Japanese: Versuchung～抜け駆け～)	Directed by : Hikaru Sato; Storyboarded by : Toshihiro Kikuchi	Kazuyuki Fudeyasu	April 8, 2011
Following their battle, Shizuku suggested that all four of them stay together in the same house as a precaution against the White Kämpfer. As it turns out it was actually another move to get close to Natsuru. The following day, the four of them became concerned about Kaede's seemingly polite behaviour at school the next day. Shizuku interrogates the original Entrails Animal, Burnt Alive Lion, about her role as a moderator, but doesn't get any straight answers. Mikoto, worried that she is "left behind", asks Akane to teach her how to kiss, but they are both seen by Sayaka Nakao, who tricked Mikoto into a trap, thus being hypnotized. Meanwhile, Kaede calls out Natsuru and seduces him, before stopping his movements while Mikoto, under control by Kaede and the White Kämpfers, starts to make moves on him. As Shizuku and Akane arrive on the scene, Shizuku manages to bring Mikoto back to her senses before they join the others in fighting Kaede.
OVA–14	"Everyday Life ～I Wanna See Some Good Things About Kämpfer～"; Transliteration: "Jeden Tag Leben ~ Hisashiburi na node, Kenpufā no chotto iitoko mite mitai" (Japanese: Jeden Tag Leben 〜ひさしぶりなので, けんぷファーのちょっといいとこ見てみたい〜)	Directed by : Shigeru Inoue; Storyboarded by : Mitsue Yamazaki	Hiroko Fukuda	May 25, 2011
With Natsuru unable to afford any new bras, Akane suggests she take up a part time job, with the both of them being blackmailed by the student council to work at a bunnygirl café. To make matters worse, male Natsuru inadvertently agrees to attend a mixer at the same café, which Shizuku and Mikoto also attend. As the mixer goes on, Shizuku teases Natsuru with questions about the kind of girl s/he likes and some under-the-table footwork. After the shift is over, Natsuru and Akane hide in a locker to avoid being caught naked by others and end up getting locked in. Akane transforms and almost succumbs to the situation, but they are soon freed by the student council who take more blackmail photos. Note: The subtitle "Jeden Tag Leben" actually translates as "Live Every Day". To match the English subtitle, the correct German term used should be "Alltagsleben".
