= List of Basquash! episodes =

Basquash! (バスカッシュ!, basukasshu!) is a sports and sci-fi anime production scheduled to air on Mainichi Broadcasting System in 2009 that involves characters playing basketball while riding mecha. This new series premise was created by Thomas Romain and Shoji Kawamori, with the animation produced by Satelight. The project direction is being handled by Shoji Kawamori, while the series direction is done by Shin Itagaki.

The opening theme from episodes 2-13 was "nO limiT" by Haruka Tomatsu, Saori Hayami and Megumi Nakajima. From episodes 14–26, the opening theme was changed to "Boku ga Boku no Mama" by THE SPIN. The ending theme from episodes 1-12 was "free" by Yu Yamada. In episode 13, it was "Running On" by Haruka Tomatsu, Saori Hayami and Megumi Nakajima. From episodes 14-23 and 25–26, the ending theme was "Futari no Yakusoku" by Haruka Tomatsu, Saori Hayami and Megumi Nakajima. In episode 24, the ending theme was "Hoshiwatari" by Megumi Nakajima.

== Episode list ==
=== Rolling Town arc ===
No.	Title	Original release date
1	"I am Legend"; Transliteration: "Ai amu rejendo" (Japanese: アイ·アム·レジェンド)	April 2, 2009
Dan JD is a young basketball player that terrorizes the city of Rolling Town under his alias "Dunk Mask". When he invades a match of BFB (Big Foot Basketball), he gets himself in more trouble than he could handle.
2	"Legend is Dead"; Transliteration: "Rejendo izu deddo" (Japanese: レジェンド·イズ·デッド)	April 9, 2009
After one year of imprisonment, Dan finds that his performance at the stadium inspired players throughout the city, but the commotion he caused left him with a huge debt on his shoulders. To complicate matters, he is challenged by another skilled player: Sela D. Miranda AKA the "Platinum Gale".
3	"Destroy Destroy"; Transliteration: "Desutoroi desutoroi" (Japanese: デストロイ·デストロイ)	April 16, 2009
Dan and Sela's match is interrupted by a mysterious player who started tossing balls at crushing speed at them. After some investigation, this player is revealed to be Iceman Hotty, the same person who stopped Dan at the stadium one year before.
4	"Threeway Free-Fight"; Transliteration: "Surīwei furīfaito" (Japanese: スリーウェイ·フリーファイト)	April 23, 2009
Dan, Sela and Iceman are approached by Haruka Gracia, a shoemaker from the moon who created special tennis shoes for their Big Foots, and arranged a three-way match between them. After some thinking, Dan came up with a method to have the upper hand against Iceman.
5	"Basquash!"; Transliteration: "Basukasshu!" (Japanese: バスカッシュ!)	April 30, 2009
The match between Dan, Sela and Iceman is interrupted by the police, and Haruka arranges a 3 on 3 match between them and a vicious underground team. Meanwhile Flora escapes the castle and sets for Rolling Town where she ends up being helped by Coco.
6	"Saint has Come"; Transliteration: "Seinto hazu kamu" (Japanese: セイント·ハズ·カム)	May 7, 2009
The previous match increased the popularity of Basquash through town, but the sport was outlawed due to the damages it causes to properties. To complicate matters, James Loane, a famous BFB player from the moon creates a new official league called Open City Basketball (OCB) featuring street players and BFB players alike.
7	"Within Out-Of"; Transliteration: "Wizuin Autoobu" (Japanese: ウィズイン·アウトオブ)	May 14, 2009
Jame's efforts to monopolize Basquash creates conflicts between street players and BFB players while Dan wonders about accepting his offer to join OCB or not.

=== Road! Road! arc ===
No.	Title	Original release date
8	"Pass of Truth"; Transliteration: "Pasu Obu Turūsu" (Japanese: パス·オブ·トゥルース)	May 21, 2009
Disguised as a boy, Flora joins Dan's group after meeting them on a desert town and they have a match with Iceman's former teammates who hold a grudge against him.
9	"Idol Attack!"; Transliteration: "Aidoru Atakku!" (Japanese: アイドル·アタック!)	May 28, 2009
The members of Eclipse, a famous idol band from the moon, forms a Basquash team and challenges Dan and Co. for a match.
10	"Non-stop Jump-stop"; Transliteration: "Nonsutoppu Janpusutoppu" (Japanese: ノンストップ·ジャンプストップ)	June 4, 2009
Rouge, a member of Eclipse, learns about Dan's past and comes to his aid when sad memories from his early childhood start to haunt him.
11	"In the Night Before"; Transliteration: "In Za Naito Bifoa" (Japanese: イン·ザ·ナイト·ビフォア)	June 11, 2009
Team Basquash is invited for a tournament in Turbine City. However, while scouting the city, Sela left the group to visit her mother's grave and Iceman encountered Falcon Lightwing, an old enemy of his.
12	"League League League! / Secondary Break"; Transliteration: "Rīgu Rīgu Rīgu! / Sekandarī Bureiku" (Japanese: リーグ·リーグ·リーグ! / セカンダリー・ブレイク)	June 18, 2009
League League League!: The tournament on Turbine City begins with a passport to the Moon league as a prize, and Team Basquash's first match is against some deceitful triplets. Secondary Break: The girls of Eclipse are also participating in the competition, and ask James about his true intentions behind it.
13	"See You on the Moon"; Transliteration: "Shīyū on za Mūn" (Japanese: シーユー·オン·ザ·ムーン)	June 25, 2009
Team Basquash and Eclipse both advance to the semifinals, but the match between them is cut short when Rouge falls ill before its end. While worrying about her, Dan learns from Citron and Violette about the reason behind her sickness.
14	"Splash Dash Crash!"; Transliteration: "Supurasshu Dasshu Kurashhu!" (Japanese: スプラッシュ·ダッシュ·クラッシュ!)	July 2, 2009
Team Basquash face some serious trouble in the final match of the championship when a storm strikes the town. Dan is the most affected by the slippery field, but Sela and Iceman also have their own personal issues.
15	"Run and Cannon"; Transliteration: "Ran Ando Kyanon" (Japanese: ラン·アンド·キャノン)	July 9, 2009
The members of Team Basquash arrive at the Skybloom Kingdom, but before their departure to the moon, Dan is arrested for violating the local rules and Sela hears from James about her father's death.

=== Underground arc ===
No.	Title	Original release date
16	"Underground"; Transliteration: "Andāguraundo" (Japanese: アンダーグラウンド)	July 16, 2009
After reaching moon's orbit, Team Basquash's vessel is unexpectedly thrown back to Earth Dash's surface near a hostile underground settlement where Dan is captured and forced to fight in a bloody arena.
17	"Giant Step"; Transliteration: "Jyaianto Suteppu" (Japanese: ジャイアント·ステップ)	July 23, 2009
Dan's friends learn that there is a bounty on his head and rush to warn him, while he meets Naviga, a lone giant from the moon who works in the underground mine.
18	"Memory of You"; Transliteration: "Memorī obu Yū" (Japanese: メモリー·オブ·ユー)	July 30, 2009
Dan and co. manage to reach the surface, but Iceman stays behind to confront the man who severed his left limbs. Reunited with Soichi and Haruka, and having Navi as a new companion, Team Basquash is later contacted by James who offers them a chance to win another ticket to the moon.
19	"Turn Over / Coco's Report"; Transliteration: "Tān Ōbā / ???" (Japanese: ターン·オーバー / ???)	August 6, 2009
Turn Over: Team Basquash returns to Turbine City for the special match organized by James and their opponents happen to be some old acquaintances of Sela. Coco's Report: Meanwhile Coco, who is already at the moon, reminisces about her brother's journey so far and figures out the truth about Slash.

=== Legend League arc ===
No.	Title	Original release date
20	"Fit-in Break"; Transliteration: "Fittoin Bureiku" (Japanese: フィットイン·ブレイク)	August 13, 2009
Miyuki uses the data in her late father's research in order to upgrade the team's bigfoots. The members of Eclipse announce that they will disband after a farewell concert in the Skybloom Kingdom and Rouge has her memories of Dan deleted from her brain.
21	"Total Eclipse"; Transliteration: "Tōtaru Ekurippusu" (Japanese: トータル·エクリップス)	August 27, 2009
Eager to meet Rouge once more, Dan infiltrates into the Skybloom Kingdom along Flora, unaware of Yang Harris' secret plan involving him and the Eclipse girls.
22	"Clutch Shot"; Transliteration: "Kuracchishotto" (Japanese: クラッチショット)	September 3, 2009
Dan manages to reach Rouge just to find that she does not remember him at all and in order to bring her memories back, Team Basquash breaks into Eclipse's concert to challenge them for a match.
23	"Cause Slash Said So"; Transliteration: "Kōzu Surasshu Seddo Sou" (Japanese: コーズ・スラッシュ・セッド・ソウ)	September 10, 2009
Yang seizes power in the Skybloom Kingdom while Eclipse join forces with James to rescue Dan, and as the moon starts to get en route of collision with Earth Dash, Slash announces a special Basquash league in order to bring out the legendary player destined to save both.
24	"Who are You?"; Transliteration: "Fū Ā Yū?" (Japanese: フー・アー・ユー?)	September 17, 2009
Among the chaos and destruction caused by the falling debris on Earth Dash, the Legend League begins with Iceman and Falcon participating. Miyuki comes with a way to bring Dan back to consciousness while a mysterious voice echoes through the Basquashers' minds.
25	"Above the Rim"; Transliteration: "Abavu za Rimu" (Japanese: アバヴ・ザ・リム)	September 24, 2009
At last Team Basquash arrives at the moon to participate in the Legend League, and Slash, whose real identity is revealed, joins Falcon and Iceman in a decisive match against them.
26	"Free"; Transliteration: "Furī" (Japanese: フリー)	October 1, 2009
Despite Dan and co.'s efforts, Earthdash and the moon continue to be en route of collision, and all players and their allies join forces in a last desperate try to stop it.
