= Be with You =

Be with You may refer to:

== Film and TV ==
- Be with You (2004 film), a Japanese romantic fantasy film
- Be with You (2018 film), a South Korean film
- Be with You (TV series), a 2015 Taiwanese television series

== Music ==
- "Be with You" (The Bangles song), 1988
- "Be with You" (Enrique Iglesias song), 1999
- "Be with You" (Atomic Kitten song), 2002
- "Be with You" (BoA song), 2008
- "Be with You" (Erasure song), 2011
- "Be with You" (Muse song), 2026
- "Be with You", a 2003 song by Beyoncé from Dangerously in Love
- "Be with You", a 2003 song by Carmen Rasmusen from the soundtrack to Pride & Prejudice: A Latter-Day Comedy
- "Be with You", a 2004 song by Chumbawamba from Un
- "Be with You", a 2008 song by Akon from Freedom
- Be with You (album), a 2012 album by Megumi Nakajima

== See also ==
- "To Be with You", a 1991 song by Mr. Big
