= Miss Caretaker of Sunohara-sou =

Four-panel romantic comedy manga series and its adaptations

- Volume 2 cover, featuring (left to right) Nana, Aki, and Ayaka

すのはら荘の管理人さん (Sunohara-sō no Kanrinin-san)
- Genre: Romantic comedy
- Manga
- Written by: Nekoume
- Published by: Ichijinsha
- Magazine: Manga 4-Koma Palette (2014–2022); Monthly Comic Rex (2022)
- Original run: 2014 – 2022
- Volumes: 8
- Audio drama
- Studio: Ichijinsha
- Released: July 22, 2016
- Anime television series
- Directed by: Shin Oonuma (Note: Credited as Chief Director (総監督, Sō Kantoku).); Mirai Minato
- Produced by: Hirohiko Kanbe; Hayato Kaneko; Shōta Watase; Hirotaka Imagawa; Ryōichi Ishibashi; Masao Itō; Kaito Suzuki
- Written by: Fumihiko Shimo
- Music by: Ruka Kawada
- Studio: Silver Link
- Licensed by: Crunchyroll: SEA: Medialink
- Original network: AT-X, Tokyo MX, BS11
- Original run: July 5, 2018 – September 20, 2018
- Episodes: 12
- icon

Miss Caretaker of Sunohara-sou (Japanese: すのはら荘の管理人さん Hepburn romanization: Sunohara-sō no Kanrinin-san) is a Japanese romantic comedy four-panel manga series by Nekoume. It has been serialized in Ichijinsha's seinen magazine Manga 4-Koma Palette from 2014 until 2022, after which it was moved to Monthly Comic Rex before concluding the same year. There have been seven collected tankōbon volumes released as of October 2021. An audio drama based on the manga was released in 2016, and an anime television series adaptation by Silver Link aired in 2018. An English dub of the anime has been produced by Funimation.

The series follows Aki Shiina who, wanting to reaffirm his identity as man after being teased for his feminine looks, moves to the Sunohara-sou lodging house in Tokyo. He develops a crush on Sunohara-sou's proprietor Ayaka, who along with the other girls living there often tease him and make him dress like a woman. The series was well received by critics, who liked the characters and found the writing funny.

== Plot ==
The series follows the shy Aki Shiina, whose feminine looks often cause him to be teased and mistaken for a girl. Wanting to reaffirm his identity as a man, he moves to the lodging house Sunohara-sou in Tokyo, and forms a crush on its motherly caretaker Ayaka Sunohara; his plan does not go smoothly, as Ayaka and the other residents – Yuzu Yukimoto, Sumire Yamanashi and Yuri Kazami of the Tanamachi student council – often tease him and make him wear women's clothes, while he keeps getting read as a girl.

== Characters ==
Aki Shiina (椎名 亜樹, Shiina Aki)
Voiced by: Eri Kitamura (Japanese); Haileigh Todd (English)
He is a shy boy who moves into Sunohara-sou to earn his masculinity and develops a crush on Ayaka. Over time he grows confident and dependable as the years fellows, In the end of series he confess his feeling to Ayaka and then the became caretaking partners of Sunohara-sou long after its renovations.
Ayaka Sunohara (春原 彩花, Sunohara Ayaka)
Voiced by: Rina Sato (Japanese); Sara Ragsdale (English)
She is the motherly proprietor of Sunohara-sou, who treats Aki like a child. She sometimes works outside of the dormitory to help her friend Nishiki for Oktoberfest at Yatsuho Liquor, She may be a gentle, benevolent and compassionate young woman, but she also incredibly clingy, doting, and sometimes overbearing towards the Inn's residents even when she gets lightweight and drunk fairly quickly when drinks Liquor with or without Nishiki. Despite that Ayaka is not interested in dating or marriage and preferring to continue being a caretaker for a while longer, she grew fond of Aki and affectionately calling him Akkun. At the end the series after Aki confess his feelings to her, He and Ayaka becomes caretaking partners of Sunohara-sou after its renovations years later.
Nana Sunohara (春原 菜々, Sunohara Nana)
Voiced by: Ayane Sakura (Japanese); Sarah Wiedenheft (English)
She is Ayaka's younger sister, and a gyaru.
Yuzu Yukimoto (雪本 柚子, Yukimoto Yuzu)
Voiced by: Natsumi Takamori (Japanese); Lara Woodhull (English)
She is the student council president, and is an assertive girl who wears a plush chicklet-topped hair loop on her head out of insecurity over her height. She denies to have a crush on Shiina.
Sumire Yamanashi (月見里 菫, Yamanashi Sumire)
Voiced by: Asami Seto (Japanese); Amber Lee Connors (English)
She is the student council vice-president, a tall girl who has a crush on her childhood friend Yuzu, however she has a good siblinghood relationship with Aki.
Yuri Kazami (風見 ゆり, Kazami Yuri)
Voiced by: Yume Miyamoto (Japanese); Kaitlin Moon-Jones (English)
She is the student council secretary and one of Yuzu's childhood friend, who wants to dress Aki in women's clothing because of his feminine looks and forms good terms with Matsuri who shares the same hobby of fashion designing.
Nishiki Yatsuho (八穂 錦, Yatsuho Nishiki)
Voiced by: Shizuka Ito (Japanese); Mallorie Rodak (English)
She is the proprietor of a liquor store, and a close friend of Ayaka.
Matsuri Shiina (椎名 茉莉, Shiina Matsuri)
Voiced by: Ai Kayano (Japanese); Hayden Daviau (English)
She is Aki's doting older sister, who treats him like a girl, making him cross-dress and calling him her "sister" and has a Brother complex. She froms good terms with Yuri because their love for fashion designing and force dressing cute clothing with Aki and Sumire, But also forms strong rivally with Nana due to their sisterly bond with Aki.
Maiko Osonoi (小薗井 舞子, Osonoi Maiko)
Voiced by: Megumi Nakajima (Japanese); Emily Fajardo (English)
She is one of Nana's schoolmates, and is a cheerful girl interested in younger men.
Mea Uchifuji (内藤苺愛, Uchifuji Mea)
Voiced by: Juri Nagatsuma (Japanese); Heather Walker (English)
She is one of Nana's schoolmates, and is described as a "chill" girl interested in younger men.

== Media ==
=== Manga ===
Miss Caretaker of Sunohara-sou is written and illustrated by Nekoume, and serialized as a four-panel manga by Ichijinsha in their seinen manga magazine Manga 4-Koma Palette since 2014; serialization ended on February 22, 2020, but was renewed on October 22 the same year. After the magazine ended in February 2022, Miss Caretaker of Sunohara-sou was moved to Ichijinsha's Monthly Comic Rex where it continued its run before concluding the same year. The manga has been collected in eight tankōbon volumes in Japan, the second of which included an audio drama.

==== Volumes ====
No.	Japanese release date	Japanese ISBN
1	June 22, 2015	978-4-7580-8238-9
2	July 22, 2016	978-4-7580-8268-6
3	November 22, 2017	978-4-7580-8299-0
4	September 21, 2018	978-4-7580-8314-0
5	October 23, 2019	978-4-7580-8335-5
6	October 22, 2020	978-4-7580-8354-6
7	October 21, 2021	978-4-7580-83737
8	October 27, 2022	978-4-7580-83812

=== Anime ===
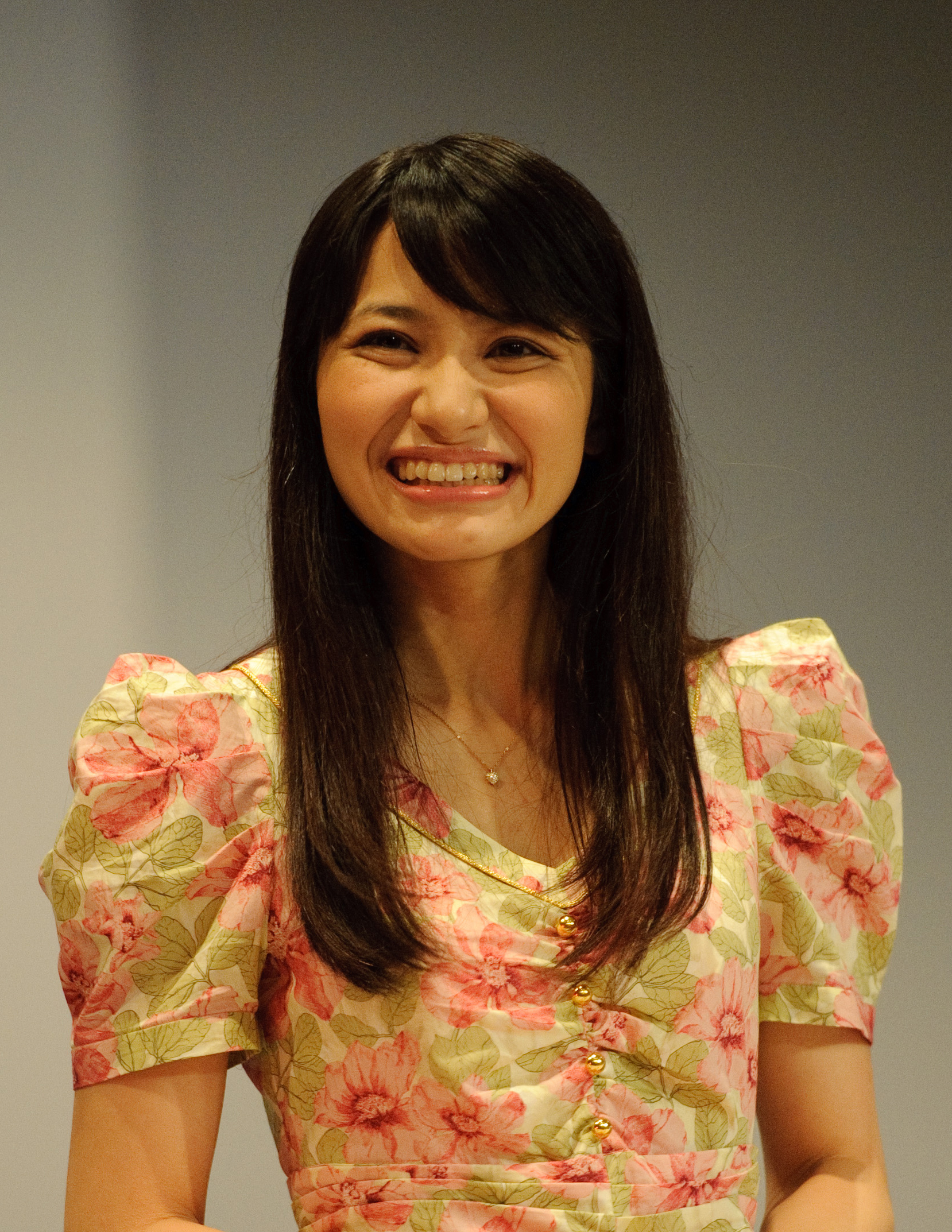
Megumi Nakajima performed the opening theme.

An anime television series adaptation of the series was produced by Silver Link, and was directed by Mirai Minato, with Shin Oonuma as chief director, Fumihiko Shimo in charge of series composition, and Kazuya Hirata designing the characters. The music was composed by Ruka Kawada at FlyingDog.

The voice cast from the audio drama reprised their roles for the anime, on request from Nekoume. Owing to the limited number of characters, only a small number of people were present during recording sessions, most of whom were women, leading to what Sato described as a cozy and friendly atmosphere. Sato aimed to make her portrayal of Ayaka come across as easy-going and gentle, while Kitamura aimed to portray Aki as innocent and pure, describing him as at times similar to "a small animal"; she thought that this was helped by how she is a woman, and that a male actor would have resulted in the character leaving a different impression.

The series aired from July 5 to September 20, 2018, on AT-X, Tokyo MX, and BS11, running for 12 episodes. The opening theme song is "Bitter Sweet Harmony" by Megumi Nakajima, and the ending theme song is "Sonna no Boku Ja Nai" (そんなの僕じゃない。; "I'm Not That Kind of Person") by Shino Shimoji.

==== Promotion and release ====
The anime was announced in a promotional video for the third manga volume in November 2017, and an event was held to promote it in June 2018, prior to the series' premiere, where the show received blessings at the Kanda Shrine in Tokyo; a theme café was also held from June to July. A life-size figure of Ayaka was additionally created to promote the show; the design was chosen through a Twitter poll for fans of the series, between two drawings by Nekoume, and the figure was shown off for the first time at the Kanda Shrine event. The figure was later put up for sale for 1.99 million yen.

The series was released across four DVD and Blu-ray volumes in Japan from September 28 to December 21, 2018, with three episodes per volume; limited editions were also released, which included acrylic figures of characters from the series. The ending theme was released on a single on August 1, 2018.

Funimation licensed the series, and released it with an English dub weekly through their website starting from July 25, 2019, followed by a North American Blu-ray release on November 10, 2020. Following Sony's acquisition of Crunchyroll, the series was moved to Crunchyroll. Animelab released the series digitally in Australia in January 2020, and released it on Blu-ray in the region on January 13, 2021.

No.	Title	Original release date
1	"Spring Breeze, Arrival in Tokyo, and Miss Caretaker"; Transliteration: "Harukaze joukyo kanrinin-san" (Japanese: はるかぜ上京 管理人さん)	July 5, 2018
Aki Shiina, who is often teased for his femininity, moves to Tokyo to enroll in a new school and reaffirm his male identity; on his way to the Sunohara-sou lodging house, however, people he pass all mistake him for a girl, including the liquor store proprietor Nishiki. Sunohara-sou's proprietor, Ayaka Sunohara, also mistakes him for a girl, not realizing her mistake until taking him to the bath. Aki develops a crush on Ayaka and wishes she would treat him like a man.
2	"Special Training, Snip-Snip, Something Scary"; Transliteration: "Tokkun choki choki kowai mono" (Japanese: 特訓 ちょきちょき 怖いもの)	July 12, 2018
A month after his arrival, Aki will do a three-legged race with Ayaka at an upcoming sports day. They practice, including teamwork exercises like bathing together, but being together so much makes Aki too exhausted for the race. Later, Ayaka impresses Aki and Sumire by removing a spider, and asks Aki to go shopping with her. He is unsure what to wear, so the girls make him wear a dress. Yuzu, impressed with Ayaka handling the spider, tells Aki to figure out Ayaka's weakness by watching her reactions to a horror movie, but the film scares Aki instead. Ayaka reveals she had concealed being scared for Aki's sake; she makes him sleep in her bed, saying she cannot fall asleep alone.
3	"Senpai, Change of Clothes, a Boy"; Transliteration: "Senpai o kigae otokonoko" (Japanese: 先輩 お着替え おとこのこ)	July 19, 2018
Yuzu reads and coerces Aki to read along over her shoulder, but eventually leaves, embarrassed over the body contact. Later, Sumire jealously tries to learn why Yuzu talks about Aki so often, and they become closer while studying. Later, Sumire locks herself up in her room, upset over having taken Yuzu to a rollercoaster she was too short to ride. The girls want Aki to cheer her up; he hesitates over entering a girl's bedroom, so they make him cross-dress as "Akiko". Later, Yuri makes Aki model women's clothes she made for him, under the pretense that only he is the right size. Despite protesting, he poses for pictures in the outfits until Yuri demands a bikini picture, and he just barely avoids being seen cross-dressing by Ayaka. As a sign of togetherness, Yuri puts one of the pictures next to a photo of the other residents.
4	"Start of the Rainy Season, Weddings, Lap Pillow"; Transliteration: "Tsuyuiri Kekkon Hizamakura" (Japanese: 梅雨いり けっこん 膝枕)	July 26, 2018
The Sunohara-sou residents discuss how they want their marriages to be, but Ayaka is happy with her current lifestyle. Aki fantasizes about marrying her, and, reading that men who cook are popular with women, helps with dinner; Yuzu calls him a better girl than she is. Later, she tells Aki that she is insecure over her breast size. She feels better after seeing Ayaka's old swimsuit, realizing that Ayaka's breasts were smaller once, too. Later, Aki and Ayaka repair the roof before the rainy season, but the ladder falls and they are stuck while it rains, until the girls come home and help them. Aki wants to bathe, but Yuzu, Yuri and Sumire do so first, after winning rock-paper-scissors against him.
5	"Watermelon, Teacher, Drunk"; Transliteration: "Suika Sensei Yopparai" (Japanese: 西瓜 せんせー 酔っぱらい)	August 2, 2018
Aki bathes with Ayaka while Yuri secretly photographs them. Yuri later tricks him into believing she is photographing spirits, but turns out to secretly have been photographing Yuzu and selling the pictures to Sumire. Ayaka helps everyone with their summer homework; Nishiki delivers a crate of beverages to Sunohara-sou, and Ayaka and Aki open juice bottles to celebrate finishing Aki's homework. Ayaka accidentally drinks an alcoholic beverage, and drunkenly kisses and hugs the residents.
6	"JK (High School Girl), Swimsuits, Summer Break"; Transliteration: "Jieke Mizugi Natsuyasumi" (Japanese: じぇーけー 水着 夏休み)	August 9, 2018
Aki enters his room, and is met by a woman who is changing clothes. She turns out to be Ayaka's sister Nana, who teases Aki by proposing to undress, calling him feminine, and trying to check if he really has a penis. Nana stays over the summer, and they become closer after sharing a bed and playing video games together. At the public swimming pool, Nana's friends Maiko and Mea spend the day flirting with Aki while calling him feminine. Nana challenges Ayaka to a swimming competition, where the winner gets to do anything they want with Aki. As they are equally fast, the pool closes before a winner is determined.
7	"Ghosts, Homework, Massage"; Transliteration: "Obake Shukudai Massāji" (Japanese: お化け 宿題 まっさーじ)	August 16, 2018
Aki and Yuzu watch a television show about ghosts, and Aki teases Yuzu about being scared until Nana scares him by sneaking up on them. Later, Nana organizes a test of stamina between herself and Yuzu, where the loser has to store Nana's gym equipment in their room. Aki, Sumire and Yuri are the judges, but Sumire keeps declaring Yuzu the winner due to finding her attractive. Eventually, Ayaka lets them keep the equipment in the storage room. When Ayaka and Aki do garden work, Aki is embarrassed over seeing Ayaka's shirt get wet and transparent. He wants to help her more, and Yuri suggests giving a massage; he eventually does, after practicing on Sumire. Nana's friends visit to get help with their summer homework; during a break, the girls play the king game, and end up kissing each other.
8	"Ear Cleaning, Lost Child, Fireworks"; Transliteration: "Mimikaki Maigo Uchiagehanabi" (Japanese: みみかき 迷子 打ち上げ花火)	August 23, 2018
Ayaka cleans Nana's and the residents' ears. Aki falls asleep while Ayaka cleans his, and the girls tease him about it until it is revealed that they fell asleep, too. Later, Nana puts on a yukata because of the fireworks festival later that night, and helps Ayaka find one in her size. At the festival, Ayaka, Nana, Maiko, Mea and Aki walk together, playing festival games. After the others tease him, Aki leaves the group and gets lost. Ayaka finds him, and the group watches the fireworks together. Nana returns home as school will begin for her again, but continues to visit during weekends.
9	"Sweet Potato, Nursing, Poster Girl"; Transliteration: "Yaki imo Kanbyō Kanban musume" (Japanese: やきいも 看病 看板むすめ)	August 30, 2018
Aki and Ayaka help Nishiki with her liquor store's Oktoberfest celebration. Nishiki only has women's uniforms, so Aki has to wear a dress while working as a waitress; she offers to make him the store's poster girl because of how pretty he is. Later, Nana visits and ends up making Ayaka insecure over her body by talking about weight gain. Ayaka exercises the entire night and catches a cold. Aki takes care of her while she rests, and has to embarrassedly wipe sweat from her naked body; after she gets better, she promises to return the favor if he gets sick.
10	"Costume, Penguins, Pretend Sister"; Transliteration: "Kasō Pengin Ane-gokko" (Japanese: 仮装 ぺんぎん 姉ごっこ)	September 6, 2018
Nishiki visits Ayaka and gives her two tickets to the aquarium. Later, Aki meets Nana, Maiko and Mea in town, and they go to a karaoke bar together. Maiko and Mea bring him into a photo booth, and take a picture of themselves kissing him. At Sunohara-sou, Nishiki and Ayaka, having spent the afternoon drinking, drunkenly cuddle and kiss; when the student council comes home, they make them join. Another day, Ayaka and Aki go to the aquarium and watch penguins together. Later, the student council takes turns role-playing as each other's and Aki's older sister while Aki tries to avoid mentioning his own sister.
11	"Invasion, Sickly-sweet, Hospitality"; Transliteration: "Shūrai Betaamai Omotenashi" (Japanese: 襲来 べた甘 おもてなし)	September 13, 2018
Aki's older sister Matsuri arrives at Sunohara-sou, making him wear women's clothes while calling him "she" and "sister". She intends to make him live with her against his wishes, but Ayaka intervenes, and Matsuri agrees to let Aki stay if Ayaka shows she can take good care of him. Ayaka impresses Matsuri with her cooking and care, and by bathing with her, and Matsuri silently accepts Ayaka's abilities. Later, Matsuri separates Aki from Ayaka to take Aki home. She gets lost and twists her ankle, so Aki carries her back to Sunohara-sou. Accepting that Aki will stay, Matsuri transfers to a nearby school and continues making him cross-dress.
12	"Heated Table, Year's End, Santa Claus"; Transliteration: "Kotatsu Nenmatsu Santa-san" (Japanese: こたつ 年末 サンタさん)	September 20, 2018
Yuzu learns that Aki believes in Santa Claus, and does not want to let him down. During Christmas celebrations, Nana wants Aki to wear a feminine Santa outfit, and Nishiki wants him to be a shrine maiden for her store for New Year's. To ensure that Aki does not stay awake and realizes Santa is not visiting, Yuzu stays in his room for the night. In the evening, Matsuri visits to give Aki a Christmas present with Ayaka's help; half-asleep, Aki mistakes Ayaka for Santa. While cleaning the house later, the student council searches Aki's room for pornographic magazines; they find a men's fitness magazine, and assume despite his protests that he is attracted to men. The residents spend New Year's Eve together, and visit a shrine the next day, where Aki wishes to be manlier and get closer to Ayaka.

== Reception ==
The first two volumes of the series were both among the best selling comics in Japan during their respective debut weeks, and by May 2018, over 350,000 copies of the manga had been sold. The anime did not have a big long-term effect on the manga sales.

Manga.Tokyo, Animate Times and Honey's Anime found the characters in the series cute, and thought it was cute to see Aki dressing like a girl. Honey's Anime considered the series cute, funny, and sexy, with the concept of being emasculated by pretty women "the ideal life", and called it funny to see Aki's misunderstandings and his attempts to impress Ayaka while pretending he is not doing so. They thought the series was not particularly original, but still thought that it succeeded in portraying its character archetypes. They liked the dynamic between Aki and Ayaka, but were at the same time grateful that their relationship did not turn romantic considering how much older Ayaka is than Aki. They considered several of the characters a bit overbearing for being clingy and harassing, though, including Maiko and Mea, Nana, Matsuri, Sumire, and Ayaka, but still found them entertaining.
