= Guardian Hearts =

Japanese manga series

- Cover of the first volume of manga as released in Japan by Kadokawa Shoten.

がぁーでぃあんHearts
- Genre: Comedy, harem, magical
- Manga
- Written by: Amatsu Sae
- Published by: Kadokawa Shoten
- Magazine: Monthly Shōnen Ace
- Original run: July 2001 – July 2005
- Volumes: 8
- Original video animation
- Directed by: Yasuhiro Kuroda
- Written by: Kanata Tanaka, Takeshi Sakamoto
- Studio: VENET
- Released: 2003
- Runtime: 15 minutes each
- Episodes: 6
- Original video animation

Guardian Hearts! Power UP!
- Directed by: Yasuhiro Kuroda
- Written by: Kanata Tanaka, Takeshi Sakamoto
- Studio: VENET
- Released: 2005
- Runtime: 15 minutes each
- Episodes: 4

Guardian Hearts (がぁーでぃあんHearts) is a Japanese manga series written and illustrated by Sae Amatsu, published from 2001 to 2005 in Monthly Shōnen Ace.

An OVA series was released in 2003, with three sets of episodes. Two years later, a new OVA series was released, named "Guardian Hearts - Power Up".

== Brief summary ==
A guardian heart by the name of Hina accidentally reveals herself to a boy. The two then begin living together. As the story progresses, more girls begin living with them for the same reason.

== Characters ==
Watari Kazuya

Voiced by: Takahiro Sakurai
The male protagonist of the show. Fortunately, or perhaps unfortunately, he discovers the secrets and identities of a number of girls throughout the series. The first girl being the Guardian Heart, Hina, and to keep her identity secret he has no choice but to let her live with him. To make matters more interesting, every girl whose secret or identity he discovers also comes to live with him and Hina.

Hina

Voiced by: Rie Kugimiya
One of the main female characters. She is a Guardian Heart, a protector of the peace and well-being of an assigned planet, who must always keep her identity a secret. Hina is sent to Earth as a last chance to redeem her previous failures at keeping her identity a secret (said to be equal to a record). This fails spectacularly as Kazuya witnesses her arrival (thus setting a new record for the fastest that a Guardian Heart's identity has been found out). She asks Kazuya to let her live with him (since he has seen her naked) so that they can pretend to be a family and so her allow her to stay, since family members are exempt from the keeping her identity secret requirement. Kazuya's mother who arrives on the scene a little later agrees to this arrangement over his strenuous objections. In addition to her duties she also has to complete tests given by her superiors so that she can stay on Earth. She loves Kazuya and pushes the other girls away when she feels they're getting too close to him.

Chelsea

Voiced by: Haruna Ikezawa
One of the main female characters. She is a princess from a magical world who came to Earth looking for a husband who is also secretly a magical girl. After her accidental meeting with Kazuya she becomes convinced that he is fated to become her husband, especially since Kazuya found out her true identity. She is very obsessed with Kazuya and constantly daydreams about him. She hates the Guardian Heart for always preventing her from getting close to Kazuya and is unaware that Hina is the Guardian Heart.

Maya

Voiced by: Kae Araki
One of the main female characters. She is known as "Black Maya" by her ninja clan. Although she is a runaway ninja (for reasons unknown), she still calls herself a ninja from her clan and upholds the clan traditions. One of these traditions is to keep their identity secret, and kill anyone who knows their identity. Kazuya finds out about her identity as a ninja when he discovers her ninja tools. She attempts to kill Kazuya but Hina intervenes and they face off. Kazuya helps Maya escape from Hina, saving her life. Since ninjas of Maya's clan must always repay their debts she also comes to live with him, looking for the opportunity to repay the favor. Initially she hates Kazuya, especially since according to her clan's traditions she has no choice but to become his wife (because not only has he seen her naked twice, he has also kissed her twice). As the story progresses, she warms up to him as she realizes he is reliable and kind. Consequently, she comes to believe that Kazuya is fated to be her husband, although she has difficulty in expressing her feelings. She hates the Guardian Heart for beating her in their fight.

Kurusu

Voiced by: Kyouko Tsuruno
One of the main female characters. Kurusu is an alien who comes from a planet whose people have the power to use the skills and powers shown by the clothes they are wearing (mostly uniforms), and so she always cosplays. She fell in love with Kazuya at first glance, since she immediately confessed her identity to him on their meeting for the first time, but their conversation was interrupted by Guardian Heart. She also hates the Guardian Heart for interrupting her confession to Kazuya. She also lives with Kazuya.

Kotono

Voiced by: Hisayo Mochizuki
One of the female characters that lives together with Kazuya. She is a miko (priestess) from the planet Karutei, and so she can sense spiritual power and also exorcise spirits. Her reason for staying with Kazuya is unknown, but she apparently lives with him when the rest of the girls starting living with him as well. She loves to eat, and can digest foodstuffs that are deadly to humans.

Daisy

Voiced by: Mayumi Shintani
A female talking cat who started living at Kazuya's house but is closer to his mother than him. She gets along with Kazuya and the girls, except Chelsea whom she started teasing even before she started living with Kazuya (for some reason). She encourages all of the girls except Chelsea to become closer to Kazuya. When her ear is pulled three times she turns into a big monster which just looks like a Godzilla-sized white cat.

Tori

Voiced by: Omi Minami
A yellow bird, who can transform into a girl. Her true identity is unknown, but she apparently has the power to transform Kazuya into a heroic figure. She is the only character who cares for everyone's well-being and doesn't take sides. She is also the narrator in the series.

== Themes ==
Opening theme
Nagareboshi no hi by Sleepin' Johnny Fish
Ending theme
Glassdama by Sleepin' Johnny Fish
