= Yasuhiro Kuroda =

Japanese storyboard artist and director

Yasuhiro Kuroda (黒田 やすひろ, Kuroda Yasuhiro) is a Japanese storyboard artist and director. He is also known by the moniker QZo, such as when he directed the anime television series Myself ; Yourself. In 2011, Kuroda founded studio AXsiZ, and has served as the studio's president since.

== Anime involved in ==
- Kyouran Kazoku Nikki: Director
- Angel's Feather: Director
- Burn Up W: Supervision
- Chocotto Sister: Director
- Full Metal Panic!: Episode Director (Eps. 2, 8, 21)
- Fushigi Yuugi: Episode Director (eps 25, 34, 41)
- Gloria: Director
- Guardian Hearts: Director, Storyboard (OP), Episode Director (ep 6)
- Guardian Hearts Power Up!: Director
- Kämpfer: Director
- Myself ; Yourself: Director (as QZo)
- Nakaimo – My Sister Is Among Them!: Producer
- Saber Marionette J to X: Episode Director (eps 3, 7)
- Shadow Skill 2: Series director
- Speed Grapher: Episode Director (ep 5)
- The Swiss Family Robinson: Flone of the Mysterious Island: Storyboard, Episode Director
- Tenchi Universe: Episode Director (eps 5,10,16,22)
