= I Love You (Megumi Nakajima album) =

Studio album by Megumi Nakajima
- Released: June 9, 2010
- Genre: J-pop
- Length: 55:40
- Label: Victor Entertainment

Megumi Nakajima chronology
I Love You (2010)	Be with You (2012)

Singles from I Love You
- 1. "Tenshi ni Naritai" Released: January 28, 2009; 2. "Nostalgia" Released: March 11, 2009; 3. "Jellyfish no Kokuhaku" Released: December 9, 2009

I Love You is the first album by Japanese singer Megumi Nakajima. It was conceived as a "concept album" where each song is a "love letter" for each month of the year, starting with April for "Shining On" and moving through the rest of the months in chronological order. It contains new songs and some of her previous singles. The first press limited edition includes singles from several animations.

== Track listing ==
No.	Title	Lyrics	Music	Arrangement	Length
1.	"Shining on"	Kanako Kato	Ryosuke Shigenaga	Koji Miyashita	4:54
2.	"Raspberry Kiss"	Megumi Nakajima & Kanako Kato	Ryosuke Shigenaga	Tatoo	4:10
3.	"Yubisaki no Ame" (ゆびさきの雨 Fingertip Rain)	Goro Matsui	Etsuko Yamakawa	Etsuko Yamakawa	5:00
4.	"Sunshine Girl"	Daichi Hayakawa & Megumi Nakajima	Daichi Hayakawa	Daichi Hayakawa	4:51
5.	"Sorairo Love Letter" (空色ラブレター Sky-Colored Love Letter)	Kanako Kato	Ryosuke Shigenaga	Koji Miyashita	4:31
6.	"Call Me"	Megumi Nakajima	Takuya Watanabe	Takuya Watanabe	4:53
7.	"Jellyfish no Kokuhaku" (ジェリーフィッシュの告白 Confession of a Jellyfish)	Yūho Iwasato	Dan Miyakawa	Dan Miyakawa	4:13
8.	"Be Myself"	Haruyuki	Yoshimasa Fujisawa	Yoshimasa Fujisawa	4:51
9.	"white heart rhythm"	Shin Furuya	Ryosuke Shigenaga	Masaki Iehara	4:11
10.	"Tenshi ni Naritai" (天使になりたい I Wanna Be an Angel)	Haruyuki	Ryosuke Shigenaga	Ryo	4:29
11.	"Watashi ni Dekiru Koto" (わたしにできること Things I Can Do)	Dan Miyakawa	Dan Miyakawa	Dan Miyakawa	5:12
12.	"Nostalgia" (ノスタルジア)	Haruyuki	Ryosuke Shigenaga	Keita Kawaguchi	4:17
Total length:					55:40

First Press Bonus CD
No.	Title	Lyrics	Music	Arrangement	Length
1.	"Lion -Ranka ver.-" (ライオン -ランカver.-)	Gabriela Robin	Yoko Kanno	Yoko Kanno	5:06
2.	"After The Heart Rain"	Seiji Miura	Kohei Tsunami	Itaru Takeshi Fujisawa	4:38
3.	"Sugao de Fall in Love" (素顔でフォーリンラブ)	Saori Kodama	Yoko Minami	BY-P	4:07
4.	"Tartaros" (タルタロス)	Masaori Koda	Nanyouko	BY-P	5:01
Total length:					18:54

Limited Edition DVD
No.	Title	Length
1.	"Sunshine Girl" (PV)
2.	"Jellyfish no Kokuhaku" (ジェリーフィッシュの告白 Confession of a Jellyfish) (PV)
3.	"Making of 'I Love You'"
