= Nomad (animation studio) =

Japanese animation studio

Nomad, Inc.
- Native name: 有限会社ノーマッド
- Romanized name: Yūgen-gaisha Nōmaddo
- Type: Yūgen gaisha
- Industry: Japanese animation
- Founded: July 2003; 23 years ago
- Founder: Tatsuya Ono
- Headquarters: No. 5-chome Shimizu-ku, Suginami, Tokyo, Japan
- Key people: Tatsuya Ono (CEO)
- Revenue: 3,000,000 yen
- Number of employees: 36
- Website: nomad-inc.co.jp

Nomad, Inc. (有限会社ノーマッド, Yūgen-gaisha Nōmaddo) is a Japanese animation studio located in Suginami, Tokyo formed by former Pierrot staff and Madhouse producer Tatsuya Ono in July 2003.

== Produced series ==
=== Television series ===
- Rozen Maiden (2004)
- Rozen Maiden: Träumend (2005–2006)
- Rozen Maiden: Ouvertüre (2006)
- Hime-sama Goyōjin (2006)
- Chocotto Sister (2006)
- Sola (2007)
- Kyōran Kazoku Nikki (2008)
- Yozakura Quartet (2008)
- Modern Magic Made Simple (2009)
- Kämpfer (2009)
- We Without Wings (2011)
- Kämpfer für die Liebe (2011)
- Chronicles of the Going Home Club (2013)
- Futari wa Milky Holmes (2013, with J.C.Staff)
- Tantei Kageki Milky Holmes TD (2015, with J.C.Staff)
- Venus Project: Climax (2015)
- Dropkick on My Devil! (2018–2022)
- Bungo Stray Dogs Wan! (2021–present, with Bones)
- Koikimo (2021)
- Alice Gear Aegis Expansion (2023)
- Pseudo Harem (2024)
- Cultural Exchange with a Game Centre Girl (2025)

=== OVA/ONAs ===
- Strawberry 100% (2005, episodes 1–3; co-animated with Madhouse, DR TOKYO, and Office Take Off (episode 3))
- Sola (2007)
- Kaitō Tenshi Twin Angel (2008)
- T.P. Sakura - Time Paladin Sakura - Jikū Bōeisen (2011)
- We Without Wings (2011)
- Dropkick on My Devil! (2019)
- Alice Gear Aegis: Heart Pounding! Actress Packed Mermaid Grand Prix! (2021)

=== Video games ===
- Monster Boy and the Cursed Kingdom (2018, opening and ending cinematics)
