= Kämpfer =

Japanese light novel series

- Cover of the first volume of Kämpfer as published by Media Factory

けんぷファー (Kenpufā)
- Genre: Action, harem, romantic comedy
- Light novel
- Written by: Toshihiko Tsukiji
- Illustrated by: Senmu
- Published by: Media Factory
- Imprint: MF Bunko J
- Original run: November 24, 2006 – March 25, 2010
- Volumes: 15
- Manga
- Written by: Toshihiko Tsukiji
- Illustrated by: Yu Tachibana
- Published by: Media Factory
- Magazine: Monthly Comic Alive
- Original run: April 2008 – August 2013
- Volumes: 10
- Anime television series
- Directed by: Yasuhiro Kuroda
- Written by: Kazuyuki Fudeyasu
- Music by: Tatsuya Kato
- Studio: Nomad
- Licensed by: NA: Sentai Filmworks; UK: MVM Films
- Original network: TBS, BS-TBS, Sun TV
- Original run: October 2, 2009 – December 17, 2009
- Episodes: 12
- Anime television series

Kämpfer für die Liebe
- Directed by: Yasuhiro Kuroda
- Written by: Kazuyuki Fudeyasu
- Music by: Tatsuya Kato
- Studio: Nomad
- Licensed by: NA: Sentai Filmworks; UK: MVM Entertainment
- Original run: April 8, 2011 – May 25, 2011
- Episodes: 2

Kämpfer (Japanese: けんぷファー, Hepburn: Kenpufā; German for "Fighter") is a Japanese light novel series by Toshihiko Tsukiji, with illustrations by Senmu. The series contains 15 volumes, published by Media Factory under their MF Bunko J imprint between November 2006 and March 2010. The main series covers 12 volumes, while the remaining three are short story collections. A manga adaptation by Yu Tachibana started serialization in the April 2008 issue of Monthly Comic Alive. A 12-episode anime adaptation aired in Japan between October and December 2009 on TBS, and concluded in 2011 with Kämpfer für die Liebe.

== Plot ==
Natsuru Senō attends a high school that separates boys from girls. He has a crush on school beauty Kaede Sakura, who has a peculiar collection of Entrail Animals (臓物アニマル, Zōmotsu Animaru), stuffed animals styled in brutal ways of dying. One day, Natsuru discovers he has turned into a girl. His stuffed tiger named Harakiri Tora awakens and tells him that he has been chosen as a Kämpfer (ケンプファー, Kenpufā; German for "Fighter"), a female fighter who must fight against other Kämpfer that are not part of their team as indicated by a colored Bracelet of Oath (誓約の腕輪, Seiyaku no Udewa).

Natsuru attracts the attention of various girls at school who are Kämpfer, including a shy bookworm girl, Akane Mishima, who transforms into a gunslinging loudmouth, the beautiful but scheming student council president Shizuku Sangō, and later Natsuru's childhood friend, Mikoto Kondō. Natsuru is sometimes able to change back to being a boy, but because his emotions might transform him, he must then live as a male student as well as a female student with the same name at the school while keeping his switching identity a secret. To complicate things, Sakura herself is strongly attracted to Natsuru's female form, and seems to be tied to the overall formation of the Kämpfer. Later stories involve Natsuru and the girls involved in fights with other Kämpfer groups. Originally the Kämpfer are divided into two opposing factions, Red and Blue, but the White Kämpfer are formed after a truce is reached between elements within the Red and Blue Kämpfer.

== Characters ==
=== Main characters ===
Natsuru Senō (瀬能 ナツル, Senō Natsuru)
Voiced by: Marina Inoue (Japanese); Howard Wang (male), Sabrina Owen (female) (English)
The viewpoint character of the light novels, Natsuru is a second-year student at Seitetsu High School. He has a crush on Kaede Sakura, one of the school's beauties. At the start of the story, he discovers that he has been transformed into a girl, and learns that he has been chosen to be a Kämpfer with Zauber, or magic powers, such as casting fireballs. As a girl, he has longer hair styled in a ponytail. After a fight with Shizuku causes him to expose his Kämpfer form to other students of the school, Natsuru is enrolled as a girl of the same name at the school, quickly ranking among the school beauties Kaede and Shizuku.
Kaede Sakura (沙倉 楓, Sakura Kaede)
Voiced by: Megumi Nakajima (Japanese); Avery Smithhart (English)
She is Shizuku's childhood friend, crush and one of the Three Beauties of Seitetsu. She has a large collection of stuffed Entrails Animal series dolls and likes to present them to her friends; those who receive the dolls, however, tend to end up becoming Kämpfers. She began to develop an infatuation with Kämpfer Natsuru after being saved from Kämpfer Akane at the beginning of the series. She wields both a katana and a Beretta 93R against the Red and Blue Kämpfer coalition. Kaede is also shown to be strongly into female-female romance.
Akane Mishima (美嶋 紅音, Mishima Akane)
Voiced by: Yui Horie (Japanese); Brittney Karbowski (English)
A bespectacled honor student helping in the school library and Natsuru's friend, she is also a Blue Kämpfer like Natsuru. Normally very shy and soft-spoken, she becomes the exact opposite upon transforming into a Kämpfer, becoming foul-mouthed, aggressive, violent, and trigger-happy. She is a Gewehr-("gun-" or "rifle-")type Kämpfer who uses a black Springfield M1911A1 .45 pistol and appears to be ambidextrous. Akane eventually begins to harbor romantic feelings for Natsuru.
Shizuku Sangō (三郷 雫, Sangō Shizuku)
Voiced by: Kaori Nazuka (Japanese); Katelyn Barr (English)
The President of the Student Council and one of the Three Beauties of Seitetsu, she is a model honor student with a perfect attendance record. She has a calm, confident demeanor which is sometimes interpreted as cold and calculating, especially by Natsuru. She is a Red Kämpfer, which initially puts her at odds with him, and is also a Schwert-("sword-")type Kämpfer who prefers to fight wielding two short swords/daggers linked by a chain. She has a personal objective of finding the reason why Kämpfer must fight each other. She too has feelings for Natsuru.
Mikoto Kondō (近堂 水琴, Kondō Mikoto)
Voiced by: Kana Asumi (Japanese); Christina Kelly (English)
Natsuru's widely-travelled, energetic childhood friend who only recently reunited with him due to her father being an archaeologist who lives and widely travels abroad. As a result of her lifestyle, she has become a highly adventurous, risk-taking person. Although she has too much pride to explicitly admit it, she has feelings for Natsuru.

=== Messengers ===
The role of the Messenger (メッセンジャー, Messenjā) is mainly to assist those chosen to become Kämpfer in understanding the rules and mechanisms of Kämpfer combat. They take the form of Entrails Animals, stuffed animals that are notable for having their intestines sticking out from their bellies and names referring to different methods of death. Many of them have been described in the novels as having voices similar to those of specific real-life voice actors, who would in turn do the voices for them in the anime. There are five major Messengers in the anime series.

Disemboweled Tiger (ハラキリ トラ, Harakiri Tora)
Voiced by: Michiko Nomura (Japanese); Margaret McDonald (English)
Messenger for Natsuru in the form of a stabbed, scarred tiger that wears an eye patch and blood oozing from its mouth. In a scene where Natsuru was asked to turn on the TV in the hotel, it stated a preference for watching the Sazae-san anime; Michiko Nomura, who voices it, is also the voice of one of the characters in that show.
Black Seppuku Rabbit (セップク クロウサギ, Seppuku Kuro Usagi)
Voiced by: Yukari Tamura (Japanese); Juliet Simmons (English)
Messenger for Akane in the form of an impaled rabbit which has bloodshot eyes and blood oozing from its mouth. It speaks with a sarcastic tone and has a foul mouth although it is on good terms with Harakiri Tora. Its voice was described as sounding like that of Tamura, who voices it in the anime. In a scene where Natsuru was asked to turn on the TV in the hotel, it stated a preference for watching pay-channel pornography.
Electrocuted Wildcat (カンデン ヤマネコ, Kanden Yamaneko)
Voiced by: Nana Mizuki (Japanese); Kira Vincent-Davis (English)
Messenger for Shizuku in the shape of a white wildcat with bristling fur to denote electric shock. It speaks in a lively voice that sounds like Nana Mizuki, likewise she voices it in the anime. In a scene where Natsuru was asked to turn on the TV in the hotel, it stated a preference for watching Hanshin Tigers baseball games.
Strangled Stray Dog (チッソク ノライヌ, Chissoku Norainu)
Voiced by: Mamiko Noto (Japanese); Savanna Menzel (English)
Messenger for Mikoto in the appearance of a strangled dog with a noose tied around its neck. It speaks with a soft, subdued voice typical of many characters voiced by Mamiko Noto, who in turn voices it in the anime. In a scene where Natsuru was asked to turn on the TV in the hotel, it stated a preference for watching rare commercials that are only broadcast in certain regions.
Burnt Alive Lion (ヒアブリ ライオン, Hiaburi Raion)
Voiced by: Kenji Utsumi (Japanese); Andrew Love (English)
The oldest Messenger in the form of a black scorched lion. Its existence said to pre-date the Zōmotsu Animal toyline. In episode 11 of the anime, it reveals the reason behind the Kämpfer battles.
Exploding Penguin (バクハツペンギン, Bakuhatsu Pengin)
Voiced by: Rie Kugimiya (Japanese); Katelyn Barr (English)
A tsundere messenger that in the form of a penguin that has a suspended fish jumping out of its gaping mouth and its innards are pulled out from both the front and back. It is a parody to its seiyu's vocal specialty.

=== Supporting characters ===
Masumi Nishino (西乃 ますみ, Nishino Masumi)
Voiced by: Shiori Mikami (Japanese); Maggie Flecknoe (English)
A first-year member of the school's Newspaper Club, she is always after the latest scoop and has a habit of exaggerating her findings. She has long straight purple hair. She and Akane are childhood friends.
Chairman (委員長, Iin-chō)
Voiced by: Yūki Kobayashi (Japanese); Carli Mosier (English)
The leader of the trio of girls in Female Nasturu's class who exploits the latter's popularity for fun and profit. She has short brown hair and glasses.
Vice-Chairman (副委員長, Fuku iin-chō)
Voiced by: Yuko Goto (Japanese); Allison Sumrall (English)
One of the trio of girls in Female Nasturu class who exploits the latter's popularity. Unlike the others, she is attracted to the Female Natsuru and will not hesitate to be close to her when given the chance. She has short blond hair that covers part of her face.
Treasurer (会計, Kaikei)
Voiced by: Kazusa Aranami (Japanese); Elissa Cuellar (English)
One of the trio of girls in Female Natsuru class who exploits the latter's popularity and who serves as the trio accountant. She tends to sell things to the Female Natsuru. She has short purple hair, and carries a calculator.
Mikihito Higashida (東田 幹仁, Higashida Mikihito)
Voiced by: Yoshihisa Kawahara (Japanese); Joe Daniels (English)
Male Natsuru's classmate who is the president of the Bishōjo Research Club (美少女研究会, Bishōjo Kenkyūkai), an underground club to admire the girls. He has spiky light brown hair.

=== White Kämpfers ===
The White Kämpfers are a group of Kämpfers who follow orders from Kaede, after receiving their messengers during the Miss Seitetsu contest. Their surnames are similar to some voice actresses, who in turn voiced them in the anime.

Rika Ueda (植田 理香, Ueda Rika)
Voiced by: Kana Ueda (Japanese); Natalie Rial (English)
Schwert user armed with a kusarigama. She is a middle school student, and she is the only character who wears a different school uniform.
Sayaka Nakao (中尾 沙也香, Nakao Sayaka)
Voiced by: Eri Nakao (Japanese); Christie Guidry (English)
Schwert user armed with a sabre. She is incompetent and indecisive, and also acts like a tsundere.
Ryoka Yamakawa (山川 涼花, Yamakawa Ryōka)
Voiced by: Kotomi Yamakawa (Japanese); Caitlynn French (English)
Gewehr user armed with an MAC-10 submachine gun. She seems to be afraid of everything, especially the Blue and Red Kampfer.
Hitomi Minagawa (皆川 瞳美, Minagawa Hitomi)
Voiced by: Junko Minagawa (Japanese); Shelby Blocker (English)
Zauber user. She attacks by launching energy bolts against her enemies. She is a self-proclaimed tomboy, and she is noticeably tall and athletic in comparison to the other white Kampfer.

== Media ==
=== Light novels ===
The light novel series written by Toshihiko Tsukiji, with illustrations by Senmu, were released under Media Factory's MF Bunko J imprint, with 15 volumes released between November 24, 2006 and March 25, 2010. The main series covers 12 volumes, while the remaining three are short story collections.

No.	Title	Japanese release date	Japanese ISBN
1	Kenpufā (けんぷファー1)	November 24, 2006	9784840117494
2	Kenpufā Ni (けんぷファー2)	December 25, 2006	9784840117678
3	Kenpufā San (けんぷファー3)	March 3, 2007	9784840118262
4	Kenpufā Yon (けんぷファー4)	June 25, 2006	9784840118705
5	Kenpufā Go (けんぷファー5)	September 25, 2007	9784840120425
6	Kenpufā Roku (けんぷファー6)	January 25, 2008	9784840121316
7	Kenpufā Shichi (けんぷファー7)	April 25, 2008	9784840123082
8	Kenpufā Hachi (けんぷファー8)	July 25, 2008	9784840123709
9	Kenpufā Hachi Nibun no Ichi (けんぷファー8 1/2)	October 24, 2008	9784840124539
10	Kenpufā Kyū (けんぷファー9)	February 25, 2009	9784840126687
11	Kenpufā Kyū Nibun no Ichi (けんぷファー9 1/2)	March 25, 2009	9784840127257
12	Kenpufā Jyū (けんぷファー10)	July 24, 2009	9784840128353
13	Kenpufā Jyū Nibun no Ichi (けんぷファー10 1/2)	September 25, 2009	9784840130301
14	Kenpufā Jyūichi (けんぷファー11)	December 25, 2009	9784840131346
15	Kenpufā Jyūni (けんぷファー12)	March 25, 2010	9784840132541

=== Manga ===
A manga adaptation, written by Tsukiji and illustrated by Yu Tachibana, began serialization in the April 2008 issue of Monthly Comic Alive. The first tankōbon volume was released on October 23, 2008; ten volumes have been released with the last being on July 23, 2013.

No.	Japanese release date	Japanese ISBN
1	October 23, 2008	9784840122825
2	March 23, 2009	9784840125482
3	September 23, 2009	9784840129176
4	February 23, 2010	9784840129855
5	December 22, 2010	9784840137188
6	March 23, 2011	9784840137744
7	October 22, 2011	9784840140461
8	June 23, 2012	9784840144810
9	January 23, 2013	9784840147828
10	July 23, 2013	9784840150842

=== Anime ===
A 12-episode anime series adaptation produced by Nomad, directed by Yasuhiro Kuroda, and written by Kazuyuki Fudeyasu aired in Japan on TBS between October 2 and December 17, 2009. The opening theme is "Unreal Paradise" (あんりある♥パラダイス) by Minami Kuribayashi and the ending theme is "One Way Ryō Omoi" (ワンウェイ両想い) by Marina Inoue and Megumi Nakajima. The anime has been licensed in North America by Sentai Filmworks. Distributor Section23 Films, through its Sentai Filmworks division, released the series in a complete collection on January 18, 2011. An additional two episodes, titled Kämpfer für die Liebe (けんぷファー) für die Liebe(フュア ディ リーヴェ), Kenpufā Fyua di Rīve; lit. 'Fighter for Love'), were screened at an event held at Odaiba Cinema Mediage theater in Tokyo on March 6, 2011, with only one of the episodes aired on TBS on April 8, 2011. Sentai Filmworks re-released the series on Blu-ray with an English dub on May 28, 2019.

== Reception ==
Theron Martin of Anime News Network called the series a "spiritual descendant" of Maze: The Mega-Burst Space and Ranma ½ which feature characters who regularly switch genders, but is a "harem comedy." However, Martin argues that the action-oriented and harem-oriented elements are not balanced in the series, with the harem comedy stronger, and said that the "perverse and sometimes twisted sense of humor" of the show works best, and even says that while there is fan service, it is "fairly tame by recent standards". He also said that the music score has "fun little themes" and said the plot "is a mess".
