= Basquash! =

Japanese anime television series

- Promotional poster for the television series

バスカッシュ! (Basukasshu!)
- Genre: Action, mecha, sports
- Created by: Shōji Kawamori; Thomas Romain; Satelight
- Anime television series
- Directed by: Shōji Kawamori (Note: Credited as Project Director (プロジェクト・ディレクター, Purojekuto Direkutā).); Hidekazu Satō; Shin Itagaki (#1–19)
- Written by: Tatsuo Satō
- Music by: Audio Highs; Kei Yoshikawa
- Studio: Satelight
- Licensed by: NA: Maiden Japan
- Original network: MBS
- Original run: April 3, 2009 – October 1, 2009
- Episodes: 26
- Manga
- Written by: Tetsuya Hayashi
- Published by: Kadokawa Shoten
- Magazine: Shōnen Ace
- Original run: January 26, 2009 – September 26, 2009
- Volumes: 2
- Manga

Basquash! Eclipse Stage
- Written by: Kagemaru
- Published by: Kadokawa Shoten
- Magazine: Comp Ace
- Original run: April 25, 2009 – September 26, 2009
- Volumes: 1

Basquash! (バスカッシュ!, Basukasshu!) is a Japanese anime television series animated by Satelight. Created by Shōji Kawamori and Thomas Romain, the series aired on MBS between April and October 2009. The anime is licensed by Maiden Japan.

== Plot ==
In the world of "Earth Dash", humanity is divided between the highly advanced lunar society and the struggling surface society. One of the most popular sports is BFB (Big Foot Basketball), where players compete while riding mecha known as "Big Foot" in a massive arena. In Rolling Town, Dan JD and his friends discover a passion for the sport and adapt it for street play, renaming it "Basquash". Despite facing numerous obstacles and setbacks, Dan and his team refuse to give up on their dreams of greatness. Along their journey, they must overcome their past hardships and confront powerful opponents to prove their worth in the world of Basquash.

== Characters ==
=== Main characters ===
==== Team Basquash ====
Dan JD (ダン・ジェイディー, Dan Jeidī)
Voiced by: Hiro Shimono

The main protagonist, Dan, is a young boy who loves basketball but despises BFB due to an accident that crippled his sister. His attempt to demoralize the sport ended up making it more popular when he invaded an official BFB game and awed the crowd with a highly skilled demonstration under his alias, "Dunk Mask", on his own Big Foot, which he named Dangan. As a result of the widespread destruction, he is imprisoned for a year and charged with massive debt, numbering 5.3 billion Rollings (the local currency). This event, as well as Dan himself, has since gained the status of a legend, inspiring the sport of Big Foot Streetball. His dream is to make enough money to pay for his debts and send his sister to the Moon to treat her paralyzed legs. He has developed a strong rivalry with Iceman as an opponent and ally. Near the end of the OCB tournament, Dan realizes Rouge's feelings for him after she played against him without reinforcement medication in an attempt to keep her play honest, resulting in her losing consciousness in the middle of the game. As she left for the Moon, he promised to eventually travel to the Moon himself, asking her to wait for him, hinting that he may have developed feelings for her. Dan can throw a "thunderbolt ball", a basketball that shines with a 'radiant light that traced a shape of the heavens creation.' For this, he is believed to be the Legend, the one destined to save Earthdash and Mooneyes. At the end of the series, it is revealed that he is not the Legend; everyone who is a 'basquasher' (a term for Basquash players that he coined) is a part of the Legend. Using their combined skills and their own 'thunderbolt balls,' the 'basquashers' reactivate the ultimate in Mooneyes by throwing a 'final dunk'' bumping Mooneyes back into orbit, effectively saving Earthdash and Mooneyes, as they were previously in a collision course with each other. In the aftermath, all that is seen of Dan is him about to play basketball with Iceman, affirming that he will continue to play and that he has not lost any passion for basketball, and possibly Basquash, either.

Sela D Miranda (セラ・ディー・ミランダ, Sera Dī Miranda)
Voiced by: Shizuka Itō

A skilled basketball and BFB player with the nickname of "Platinium Gale". She likes to be abused, but hates weaker men and is looking for a well suited match. She believes Iceman to be this special man and on one occasion has asked for his "genes". When Dan played at the official BFB game one year ago, she claims to have believed him to be "the one" as well. She has been shown to have some affection for Dan, though it may have faded. It is later revealed that she is the daughter of a wealthy business-man, whose family later disowned her mother and herself, since she was a female, and not able to become an heir. For as yet unexplained reasons, her mother later died. She resents her family and her father for both abandoning her mother, and only watching her as she died. After their departure from Turbine City, she learned that her father was killed. Her reaction is mixed, on part with her past hatred of him, and the fact that she can't deny the fact that despite their past, she still sees him as a father. After the Old Timers began talking to her about her father, it is revealed that her father may have had other personal and possibly more benign reasons for disowning her. She has since come to peace with her father's memory. Upon meeting Navi, she reveals feelings that go deeper than just "wanting his genes", a dogma she had kept with all other males she had been attracted to. However, she states that she does not like nor dislike him; it is just the fact that he is too big for her. Towards the end of the series, she dismisses this previous statement, and acknowledges her feelings for Navi, regardless of their difference in size, during the final moments of the Legend Tournament. Together, they participate in the 'final dunk', along with Dan, Iceman, Rouge, Falcon, and Flora contributing their part of the Legend. In the aftermath, she is being looked after by the Old Timers in Turbine City, with Navi. Navi and Sela are together, playing Basquash, happy, and possibly in a relationship with each other.

Iceman Hotty (アイスマン・ホッティ, Aisuman Hotti)
Voiced by: Yuichi Nakamura

A vicious BFB player with a shrouded past holds a grudge against Dan, for destroying the BFB statium, ruin his game and destroying his honor. He is also known as "The Frozen Inferno" and is skilled at long shots. He beats his enemies by throwing balls at them with crushing speed while shouting "Destroy!" These balls, once thrown, take on a dark blue color due to their strength. Later, it is revealed that these are his own personal "thunderbolt ball". He wears blue glasses and has dark red eyes. His savage gameplay contrasts vastly with his personality off the Big Foots where he is normally portrayed as a cool and polite person.

It was later learned, in a rather unorthodox manner by Dan, that the "Destroy" balls he throws at his teammates (causing them to be victims of these vicious projectiles) are actually passes. This can be interpreted that Iceman cannot let go of a ball without it becoming a "Destroy Ball" while playing. He holds a grudge against Falcon Lightwing, who threw him out of their BFB team, causing Iceman to fall from grace.

Sometime after his fall from grace, Iceman's original left arm and left leg were cut off by Price of Hell in the Underground, causing him to lose his title of "Legend". It has been confirmed that he was one of the people before Dan believed to be the Legend. After his amputation, Thousand replaced his limbs, giving him his robotic left arm and left leg. Since joining Dan, Iceman has matured considerably, going so far as to forgive Falcon. This fact is more apparent when he makes a Basquash team with Falcon during the Legend Tournament. They are the only ones with a team of two; later, the third spot is filled by Slash Keens.

He becomes the co-spokesman of the Legend Tournament, urging all Basquashers (more specifically, Dan) to come to Mooneyes and participate. In the final moments of the Legend Tournament, when Mooneyes' ultimate failed to activate after Dan's dunk, Iceman urged Dan to continue playing regardless. Dan joined him, and together they formed the lead to the culmination of the Legend, using Yang's Legend Bullet as a basketball and dunking it as their 'final dunk.' In the aftermath, he is seen waiting for Dan as they are about to start a one-on-one basketball game, showing that he will continue to play basketball and possibly Basquash.

Flora Skybloom (フローラ・スカイブルーム, Furōra Sukaiburūmu)/Alan Naismith (アラン・ネイスミス, Aran Neisumisu)
Voiced by: Rie Kugimiya

A foreign princess was awed by the three-way match between Dan, Sela, and Iceman during her passage through Rolling Town. She seems to have some sort of supernatural 'sixth sense', claiming to sense "destiny on the wind" when the aforementioned were playing their match, as well as when she sensed Iceman's rage as he destroyed a statue of Dunk Mask. Flora eventually runs away to Rolling Town to chase after these voices. She takes up playing Basquash and pretends to be male under the assumed identity of "Alan Naismith", named after the inventor of basketball, James Naismith. To be on par with the rest of the group, she was coached in playing basketball by Coco. It is later revealed that the voices she hears with her 'sixth sense' are 'the stones' (ultimate) and ruins of Earthdash speaking to her and that this ability runs in the royal family of Skybloom. However, her father, King Regalia, is currently unable to hear the stones. For most of the series, she remains under her guise of Alan Naismith. During the course of the series, she learns that none of the girls are fooled, and only the boys in the group remain ignorant of her gender. Much later in the series, she and Dan were threatened by her own soldiers. In reaction to this, she drops her guise and subdues the soldiers. Though Dan was the most oblivious to her gender, he says, once she reveals her real name, that he doesn't mind since she is a 'basquasher' like everyone else. She goes with the rest of the group to participate in the Legend Tournament, but at the last moment, she realizes that her level is too inferior to keep up with everyone else. In tears, she asks Rouge to replace her. In the final moments of the Legend Tournament, she hears the voices of 'the stones' once more and realizes that the Legend Bullet is made of ultimate. With this information, Rouge is able to catch the Legend Bullet and hand it to Dan and Iceman for the 'final dunk'. She is seen later playing Basquash with Falcon in the "Final Dunk". In the aftermath, Flora is seen in traveling gear on Earthdash, possibly traveling throughout the world..

Naviga Stelte (ナヴィガ・ステルテ, Naviga Suterute)
Voiced by: Takayuki Kondo

A Moon giant whose ancestors were brought to Earthdash to mine ultimate in the Underground because it was poisonous to humans but not to them, he is called Navi for short. He wears a suit that is as big as a Big Foot, possibly to provide him protection from the ultimate due to his weakened resistance to its poisonous effects. He protected his friends' graves until Dan found him and introduced him to the world of Basquash, telling him that his friends would not want him to spend the rest of his life protecting their graves. Navi is now the newest member of Team Basquash, as well as the only member of the team who does not need a Big Foot to play, mainly because he is roughly the size of one. However, he has not been able to play in many official games since the group did not want to attract attention. Sela has developed feelings for him, though she ignored them at first. At first, he did not reciprocate, but eventually developed feelings for her as well. Although he did not participate in the Legend Tournament, he appeared during its final moments to deliver tennis shoes to Dan, who had burned off the ones he used during the tournament. He then went on to give his own part of the legend in the 'final dunk', along with Rouge, Dan, Iceman, Falcon, Flora, and Sela, with whom he shared the dunk. In the aftermath, he is seen with Sela playing Basquash, happy, and possibly in a relationship with her.

Spanky (スパンキー, Supankī)
Voiced by: Aya Endō

Dan's pet/partner with shape-shifting abilities looks like a gremlin. He usually transforms himself into a set of earmuffs/headbands or the trademark mask that Dan uses to hide his identity as the delinquent "Dunk Mask". Alternatively, he can turn into a restricting face-cover (his friends had Spanky do this when Dan wouldn't shut up, knocking him out with flatulence). Spanky seems to have a very similar personality to Dan, and it is understandable why the two would get along – albeit in a rather violent and argumentative fashion. He has also been known to give Dan a heads-up now and then, which helps him avoid being completely surprised by some surprise attacks. Spanky is always hungry and is said to be able to eat almost anything, regardless of size or material. Similarly, to Dan in his boasts, Spanky boasts that he would be able to eat anything – even the world (though he says that it would be quite a mouthful). In the aftermath, he is seen with Dan, who is about to engage Iceman in a one-on-one basketball match.

Crawley (クローリー, Kurōrī)
Voiced by: Yū Kobayashi

Sela's pet/partner who looks like a white snake and is usually seen coiled around her left arm. Crawley also sometimes acts as a "person" for Sela to talk to. She is often a voice of reason to Sela, and acts quite coolly compared to Spanky, who always overreacts. Though she is always seen with Sela, she has a much smaller role than the other characters. In the aftermath, she is seen, as always, with Sela.

Righty & Lefty (ライティ&レフティ, Raiti to Refuti)

Righty and Lefty are Iceman's pet/partners with shape-shifting abilities that resemble salamanders. They typically transform into Iceman's glasses, and when he appears without them, the creatures are often nearby. It's unclear whether they can communicate verbally, but given their similarity to Spanky and Crawley, who appear to be related, it's possible.

Jiya (爺や, Jīya)
Voiced by: Yasuhiro Mamiya

Flora's pet/partner is a guardian who resembles a hair ornament and takes the form of a butterfly when not on her. He frequently acts as Flora's caretaker, alerting her when she drops her disguise in front of her soldiers. He also has a wife named Baaya, who acts as the pet/partner of Flora's sister, Aulora.

===== Staff =====
Miyuki Ayukawa (ミユキ・アユカワ)
Voiced by: Masumi Asano

Dan's childhood sweetheart who moved away from his neighborhood when they were children. She returned in the first episode as a well-endowed teenager and a skilled mechanic. Upon her return she gives him and teaches him how to pilot a BigFoot. She cares for Dan and his team's Big Foots, something she does happily, as it gives her more work to do (and get paid for). She also has been shown as having deep feelings for Dan even though he doesn't notice them. Later, she redesigns the team's BigFoots, making them move much faster and smoother than before, enough to create an afterimage. Though she is not a basquasher, she is still an irreplaceable part of the team, constantly fixing and upgrading all of their BigFoots. Though she has feelings for Dan, she steps aside once Rouge comes into the picture, and accepts their mutual attraction. She did not participate in the Legend Tournament, but she did go with everyone, and did the finishing touches on the BigFoots. Her upgrades were overwhelming; the shoes that Haruka made for Dan were burned off after he pushed the BigFoot to its limits. In the aftermath, she is seen working with her grandfather on an orange BigFoot (it is highly probably that it is Dan's), showing that she will continue to be a mechanic.

Ganz Bogard (ガンツ・ボガード, Gantsu Bogādo)
Voiced by: Kenjirō Tsuda

One of Dan's friends and former accomplices during the Dunk Mask era – he sold the parts of the TV's they vandalized. He also gave the group the idea of giving the Big Foots sandals made of tires when he brought a large amount of human-sized tire sandals for them to deliver. Haruka took an interest on him because his head looks like a foot. He is shown to be a good salesman, and frequently disappears on Haruka's orders to conduct business elsewhere. In the aftermath, he is seen selling things at a store.

Bel Lindon (ベル・リンドン, Beru Rindon)
Voiced by: Yumiko Kobayashi

An overweight friend and former accomplice of Dan. He studies various aspects of the buildings in Rolling Town and dreams of becoming an architect. He frequently directs Dan's routes around town. As Bel reportedly knows everything about every building in Rolling Town, he can create "safe" delivery routes (Dan was destroying buildings while delivering packages). He also helps Dan out with his new playing strategy, setting up markers around town with him before the match with Sela and Iceman. He carries around a set of goggles. After being thrown in jail after the moon cannon incident, Bel quickly lost weight due to the bad prison food. His loss of weight was so drastic that Ganz told him to write a diet book, though he said that no one would willingly lose weight on prison food. After his release, he quickly regains his weight by overeating frequently. In the aftermath, however, it is seen that he has once again lost weight, and now works in a desk job.

Soichi Ayukawa (ソーイチ・アユカワ, Sōichi Ayukawa)
Voiced by: Masashi Hirose

Miyuki's grandfather and a skilled technician from the Moon. Haruka revealed that he was formerly a mechanics professor there, possibly of some renown. Recently it has been discovered that at one point in time he worked with Thousand and Yang on researching ultimate. He was the one who made the bigfoots after years of studies of the ultimate when he worked for lunatic corporations. After the death of his son when they studied a new way to develop the bigfoots, he stopped his work as an engineer for lunatic corporations.

Haruka Gracia (はるか・グレイシア, Haruka Gureishia)
Voiced by: Sayaka Ohara

A shoemaker from the Moon, Haruka came to Rolling Town interested in Dan and Co.'s BFB skills. She develops special basketball shoes for their Big Foots in order to promote her business. She also has a fetish for feet (unintentionally tickling Dan mercilessly while caressing his feet between her breasts upon their first encounter) and has the ability to read people's thoughts just by looking at their feet. She is well endowed due to her being from the Moon (referred to as the "Lunar Bust") and the low gravitational force, allowing her bust to develop to an abnormally large perfectly spherical size. Her shoes contain NIKE's famous swoosh logo.

==== Eclipse ====
Rouge (ルージュ, Rūju)
Voiced by: Haruka Tomatsu

Referred to as 'Idol Red', Rouge is a pink-haired member of Eclipse, a musical group from the moon and a street Bigfoot Basketball team. She's shown to have a spunky, rebellious attitude, apparent when she runs away from her manager and the press, eventually involving Dan in her escape by kissing him to hide her face. This, however, was caught on camera, and started the rumor that she was dating 'Dunk Mask'. Later on, she, along with the rest of her teammates, participates in a match against Dan, Iceman and Sela, one of Team Basquash's many traveling/fugitive matches. In the match, she receives a few slight injuries, to which she disregards, until she receives a particularly strong blow; Dan then dismounted his Bigfoot and carried her so she could receive medical attention. She later reveals to her teammates that she has developed feelings for him because of this action. During the OCB tournament, Rouge didn't take pills to enhance her performance when they played Dan. During her and Dan's match she collapsed and, later, was sent back to the moon, but not before hearing Dan's feelings toward her.

Citron (シトロン, Shitoron)
Voiced by: Megumi Nakajima

Referred to as 'Idol Yellow', Citron is the blond-haired leader of the lunar musical group/street BFB team Eclipse, and she presents herself as the most childish of them. She admires Iceman, commenting on how cool he is.

Violette (ヴィオレット, Vioretto)
Voiced by: Saori Hayami

Referred to as 'Idol Purple', Violette is the well-endowed, violet-haired member of the lunar musical group/street BFB team, Eclipse. She plays on the 'older sister' role of Eclipse, often giving advice and consoling her teammates.

==== King of Kings ====
Falcon Rightwing (ファルコン・ライトウィング, Farucon Raitowingu)
Voiced by: Kishō Taniyama

Iceman's Rival.

BB (ビービー, Bī Bī)
JB (ジェイビー, Jei Bī)

==== Skybloom Kingdom ====
Aulora Skybloom (アウローラ・スカイブルーム, Aurōra Sukaiburūmu)
Voiced by: Ayumi Fujimura
Baya (婆や, Baaya)

==== Others ====
Coco JD (ココ・ジェイディー, Koko Jeidī)
Voiced by: Kana Hanazawa

Dan's little sister, whose legs were crushed by a Big Foot, and has since used a wheelchair. Dan claims that she used to be a better basketball player than him, and was severely affected when he learned she could no longer play. Sometime after the incident, when she is in the hospital, she tells Dan that it's his fault that she became cripple because he didn't make the dunk shot. She treats her brother coldly and seems indifferent to him, despite his many attempts to bond with her. This act, however, is only a front; in reality she cares greatly about him, only projecting the cool demeanor since Dan has not yet been able to understand her true feelings regarding the incident. She is the "Ultimate Bystander", her net alias for her status as an internet blogger who continually writes about Team Basquash's and Dan/Dunk Mask's endeavours. She has been described to be 'uncannily accurate' in these blogs, reflecting her frequent following of Team Basquash.

James Loane (ジェーム・ローン, Jēmusu Rōn)/Mister Perfect (ミスター・パーフェクト, Misutā Pāfekuto)
Voiced by: Kenji Hamada

A former basketball player and the president of the BFB league, James loves sphere-shaped things such as bubbles and Haruka's Lunar-bust, and is often seen blowing bubbles out of a pipe. His bubbles are often seen before you actually see him. His alter ego, Mister Perfect, is an identity James Loane invented for himself so he could help out Dan and company without letting them know his true identity. His tools range from a rocket launcher to a basketball he can throw with pin-point accuracy.

Slash Keenz (スラッシュ・キーンズ, Surasshu Kīnzu)
Voiced by: Junko Minagawa, Katsuyuki Konishi (Past)

Slash is a mysterious person who apparently ages in reverse. He met Dan, Coco, and James when they were young. He is very skilled at basketball and has been seen with Coco. He has also brought her to the Moon just as he promised he would. He is also the Chairman of the OCB.

He is revealed later in the series to be Ascend, King of the Moon, and elder brother of King Regalia of the Skybloom Kingdom. He became young again using a secret family technique utilizing ultimate. He was also the one who introduced Dan and Coco to the game of basketball, and the one who trained James Loane, also starting his obsession with spherical objects. By the end of the series, he sacrificed himself to protect Mooneyes against the Legend Bullet created by Yang Harris. He reverted to a child, given to the care of Coco JD.

Thousand (サウザンド, Sauzando)
Voiced by: Fuyuka Oura

A skilled mechanic from the underground who hates Miyuki's grandfather. She was also the person who found Iceman after his left arm and left leg where cut off after which she built him his robotic left arm and leg.

Yang Harris (ヤン・ハリス, Yan Harisu)
Voiced by: Hirofumi Nojima

The main antagonist and is the manager of Eclipse and the general manager of lunatic corporations. He is trying to create a legend. But to do this he has to get Dan away and he was the one who had fixed so the capsule to mooneye was shot into a wrong orbit and landed close to the underground. There he pays Price money to kill Dan.

=== Minor characters ===
==== The Worst ====
MAN-Z (マン・ジー, Man Jī)
Voiced by: Kazuyuki Okitsu
FFF (スリーエフ, Surī Efu)
PPP (スリーピー, Surī Pī)

==== Tristars ====
A Germi (エー・ジェルミ, Ē Jerumi)
Bal (バル, Baru), Samico (サミコ, Samiko) & Sauce (ソース, Sōsu)
Voiced by: Nobuhiko Okamoto

==== Old Timers ====
Rosso (ロッソ, Rosso)

Rosso is an old man who worked for Sela's father he along with Garo and Bianco taught Sela how to play basketball.

Garo (ギャロ, Gyaro)

Garo is an old man who worked for Sela's father he along with Rosso and Bianco taught Sela how to play basketball.

Bianco (ビアンコ, Bianko)

Bianco is an old man who worked for Sela's father he along with Rosso and Garo taught Sela how to play basketball.

==== Others ====
DJ1 & DJ2 (ディージェイ1号&ディージェイ2号, Dījei Ichigō to Dījei Nigō)
Voiced by: Nobuaki Kanemitsu (DJ1) & Shintarō Ōhata (DJ2)
Lil (リル, Riru)
Voiced by: Junko Kitanishi
Lala (ララ, Rara)
Voiced by: Junko Kitanishi
Roberto Ganbit (ロベルト・ガンビート, Roberuto Ganbīto)
Voiced by: Atsushi Ono
Trios (盗賊トリオ, Tōzoku Torio)
Regalia XIII (レガリア13世, Regaria Jūsansei)
Price (プライス, Price)
Voiced by: Keiji Fujiwara

Price a.k.a. Price of Hell. He is a Legend hunter who kills people who are "legends". He is also the one who cut off Iceman's left arm and leg.

== Terminology ==
Big Foot
Big Foots are car-like giant robots that serve a large variety of purposes, including police robots called "Pat Foots". Their most popular form of usage is to play basketball. They are capable, by arranging the robot manually, to function as cars.
Big Foot Basketball (BFB)
A popular professional sports league on Earthdash. As its name suggests, it involves playing basketball with Big Foots. Its popularity dwindled however when Dunk Mask hijacked a game, resulting in the destruction of the Rollingtown stadium.
Basquash & Open City Basketball (OCB)
Open City Basketball, unofficially named Basquash by Dan and known earlier in the series as Big Foot Streetball. It is a new sport that involves playing streetball in a wide cityscape using Big Foots. Prior to becoming an official sports league, Big Foot Streetball was outlawed due to the destruction it caused. Many of Dunk Mask's ardent fans prefer the name "Basquash" over the official name of the sport. Basquash is actually not the combination of the terms basketball and squash, but rather a pun in Japanese from the terms "baka" meaning "idiotic" and "sukasu" meaning "unintentional acts".
Dan uses the phrase against The Worst leader, then in a flash of brilliance while chanting "baka" and "suka", starts saying "bakasuka".
Basically, Dan is jumping from word to word, punning his way, until he screams "Basquash" when he does the final squash serve-like attack, Basquash.
Earthdash

An alternate version of Earth where the story is set.

Mooneyes

The lunar metropolis whose civilization is far more advanced than Earthdash's.

Legend

According to Earthdash's mythology, the planet and its Moon were created during a basketball match played by the gods, and a magnectic field repelling each other prevent a collision between them. However, this field is weakening, and according to the legends, only a player whose skills are in par with the gods can restore the field and put the Moon back to its orbit.

== Soundtrack ==
Opening themes

1. "nO limiT" by Eclipse (エクリップス, Ekurippusu) (Haruka Tomatsu, Saori Hayami, Megumi Nakajima) (Episodes 2–13) (Episode 22 as an insert)
2. "Boku ga Boku no Mama" (僕が僕のまま) by THE SPIN (Episodes 14–26)

Ending themes

1. "free" by Yu Yamada (Episodes 1–12)
2. "Running On" by Eclipse (Haruka Tomatsu, Saori Hayami, Megumi Nakajima) (Episode 13)
3. "Futari no Yakusoku" (二人の約束) by Eclipse (Haruka Tomatsu, Saori Hayami, Megumi Nakajima) (Episodes 14–23, 25–26)
4. "Hoshiwatari" (ホシワタリ) by Citron (Megumi Nakajima) (Episodes 24)
