= Be with You (album) =

Studio album by Megumi Nakajima
- Released: March 7, 2012
- Genre: J-pop
- Length: 59:49
- Label: Victor Entertainment

Megumi Nakajima chronology
I Love You (2010)	Be with You (2012)	Thank You (2014)

Singles from Be with You
- 1. "Melody" Released: November 24, 2010; 2. "Kamisama no Itazura" Released: October 26, 2011; 3. "Try Unite! / Hello!" Released: February 1, 2012

Be with You is the second album by Japanese singer Megumi Nakajima. It features various anime tie-in songs as well as new collaborations with artists such as Yoko Kanno and Dance Man.

Seven songs featured in the album were previously used in various animated media. "Try Unite!" and "Hello!" were used as the opening and ending themes respectively for the 2012 anime television series Lagrange: The Flower of Rin-ne. "Melody" and "Natsudori" were used as the ending themes to the Tamayura anime OVA, while "Kamisama no Itazura" was later used as the ending theme to the Tamayura: Hitotose anime television. "Koi" and "Tsunagaru Made" were featured in the 2011 anime television Sacred Seven as an insert song and the final episode ending theme, respectively.

== Track listing ==
No.	Title	Lyrics	Music	Arrangement	Length
1.	"Wake Up!"	Dance Man	Dance Man	Dance Man	4:24
2.	"Try Unite! -extended version-"	Kenzo Saeki	Rasmus Faber	Rasmus Faber	5:50
3.	"Melody" (メロディ)	Katsutoshi Kitagawa	Katsutoshi Kitagawa	Katsutoshi Kitagawa, Yasuhiro Hase	5:35
4.	"Koi" (恋 Love)	Mareyuki Mitsuhashi	Mareyuki Mitsuhashi	Hideyuki Daichi Suzuki	4:23
5.	"Fly"	Minoru Komorita	Minoru Komorita	Minoru Komorita	4:35
6.	"Natsudori" (夏鳥 Summer Bird)	Mai Sugimori	Mai Sugimori	Nobuyuki Shimizu	5:30
7.	"Uchuuteki Don-Doko-Don" (宇宙的DON-DOKO-DON Cosmic Don-Doko-Don)	Megumi Nakajima, Naoki Nishi	Tatsuya Nishiwaki	Tatsuya Nishiwaki	4:00
8.	"Hello!"	Katsutoshi Kitagawa	Katsutoshi Kitagawa	Katsutoshi Kitagawa, Yasuhiro Hase	4:36
9.	"Tsunagaru Made" (つながるまで)	Dan Miyakawa	Dan Miyakawa	Dan Miyakawa	4:38
10.	"Sukissu! Kiss!!" (好キッス! KISS!! A Good Kiss! Kiss!!)	Yuki Kimura	Yuki Kimura	Hideyuki Daichi Suzuki	3:41
11.	"Kamisama no Itazura" (神様のいたずら)	Senri Oe	Senri Oe	Nobuyuki Shimizu	4:29
12.	"Kiniro: Kimi o Suki ni Natte Yokatta" (金色〜君を好きになってよかった Gold: I'm Glad I Like You)	Toshiaki Yamada	Yoko Kanno	Rasmus Faber	8:08
Total length:					59:49

=== Limited Edition Bonus DVD ===
The Limited Edition version of the album comes with a special DVD recording of the Megumi Nakajima Premium Live ～Tanjoubi made matenai!～ (Megumi Nakajima Premium Live～誕生日まで待てない！～, "Megumi Nakajima Premium Live ～Can't Wait For My Birthday!～") concert, which was recorded at Liquidroom Ebisu on June 4, 2011.

Megumi Nakajima Premium Live: Tanjobi made Matenai! Bonus DVD
No.	Title	Length
1.	"Raspberry Kiss"
2.	"Niji Iro Kuma Kuma" (虹いろ・クマクマ Rainbow-Colored Kuma Kuma)
3.	"Jellyfish no Kokuhaku" (ジェリーフィッシュ の 告白 Confession of a Jellyfish)
4.	"Aimo" (アイモ)
5.	"Ao no Ether" (蒼のエーテル Azure Ether)
6.	"Shining on"
7.	"Sukissu! Kiss!!" (好キッス! KISS!! A Good Kiss! Kiss!!)
8.	"Seikan Hikou" (星間飛行 Interstellar Flight)
