= Megumi Nakajima =

Japanese voice actress and singer (born 1989)

- 中島 愛
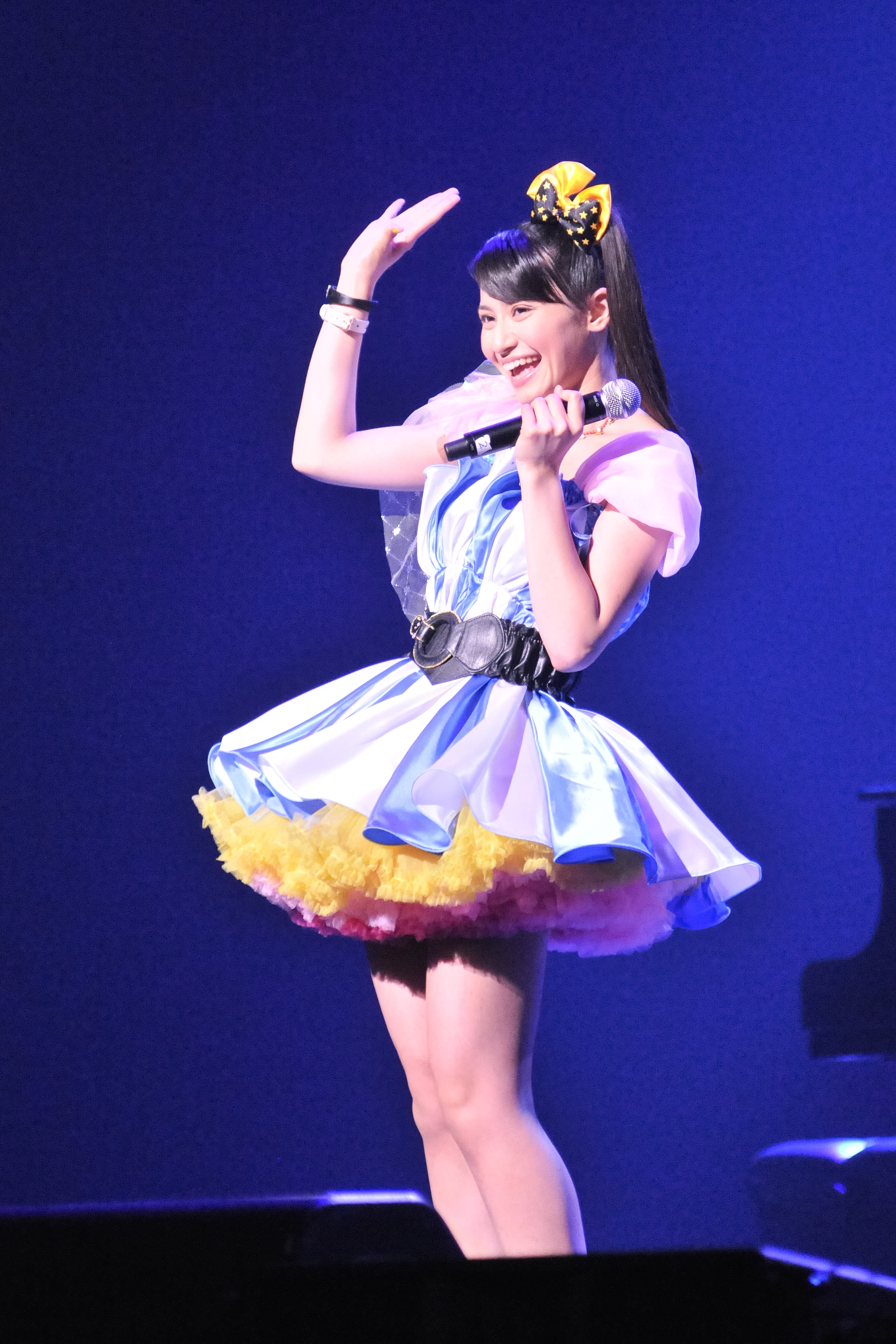
- Nakajima in 2010
- Born: June 5, 1989 (age 37); Mito, Ibaraki, Japan
- Occupations: Voice actress; singer
- Years active: 2008–present
- Agent: Stay Luck
- Height: 157 cm (5 ft 2 in)
- Musical career
- Genres: J-pop; anime song
- Years active: 2007–2014, 2016–present
- Label: Flying Dog
- Website: nakajima-megumi.jp

Megumi Nakajima (Japanese: 中島 愛, Hepburn: Nakajima Megumi; born June 5, 1989) is a Japanese voice actress and singer, who is affiliated with Stay Luck. In 2003, she joined the talent agency Stardust Promotion after passing their audition. Later, in 2007, she debuted as a voice actress and singer after passing an audition held by the music company Victor Entertainment; she was then cast as the character Ranka Lee in the 2008 anime series Macross Frontier. Her first solo single "Tenshi ni Naritai" was released in 2009, which was followed by her first solo album I Love You in 2010.

Apart from Ranka, Nakajima is also known for her roles as Kaede Sakura in Kämpfer, Lyra in Fairy Tail, Lyra and Meloetta in Pokémon, Yuzuki Eba in A Town Where You Live, Megumi Aino/Cure Lovely in HappinessCharge PreCure!, and Tuuli in Ascendance of a Bookworm. Her songs have been featured in series such as Kämpfer, Tamayura, Kotoura-san, Lagrange: The Flower of Rin-ne, and Ascendance of a Bookworm. She is also the voice provider of the Vocaloid software Megpoid. In 2013, she announced an indefinite hiatus from singing to focus on her acting career; she returned to singing in 2017 with the single "Watashi no Sekai", the title song being used as the ending theme to the anime series Fuuka.

== Early life and childhood ==
Nakajima was born in Ibaraki Prefecture on June 5, 1989, to a Filipina mother and a Japanese father. She grew up in a family fond of music; her father had been a drummer in a band. These family influences would later be cited as among the reasons she would decide to pursue a career as a singer.

In 2003, Nakajima participated in an audition held by the talent agency Stardust Promotion. She passed it and subsequently signed with the agency. Despite this, she did not make a music debut, instead training while waiting for her opportunity. As she had yet to make her debut, she was starting to "become desperate" to do anything in entertainment, and she even considered ceasing her pursuit of a singing career. While in her third year of high school, she learned of an audition held by the music company Victor Entertainment. The winner would then be cast in the upcoming anime series Macross Frontier. At the time she had not yet decided what type of artist she wanted to be, but because she believed that it was her chance, she went ahead and auditioned. She ended up being the audition's winner, which would lead to her being cast as the speaking and singing voice of the character Ranka Lee.

== Music career ==
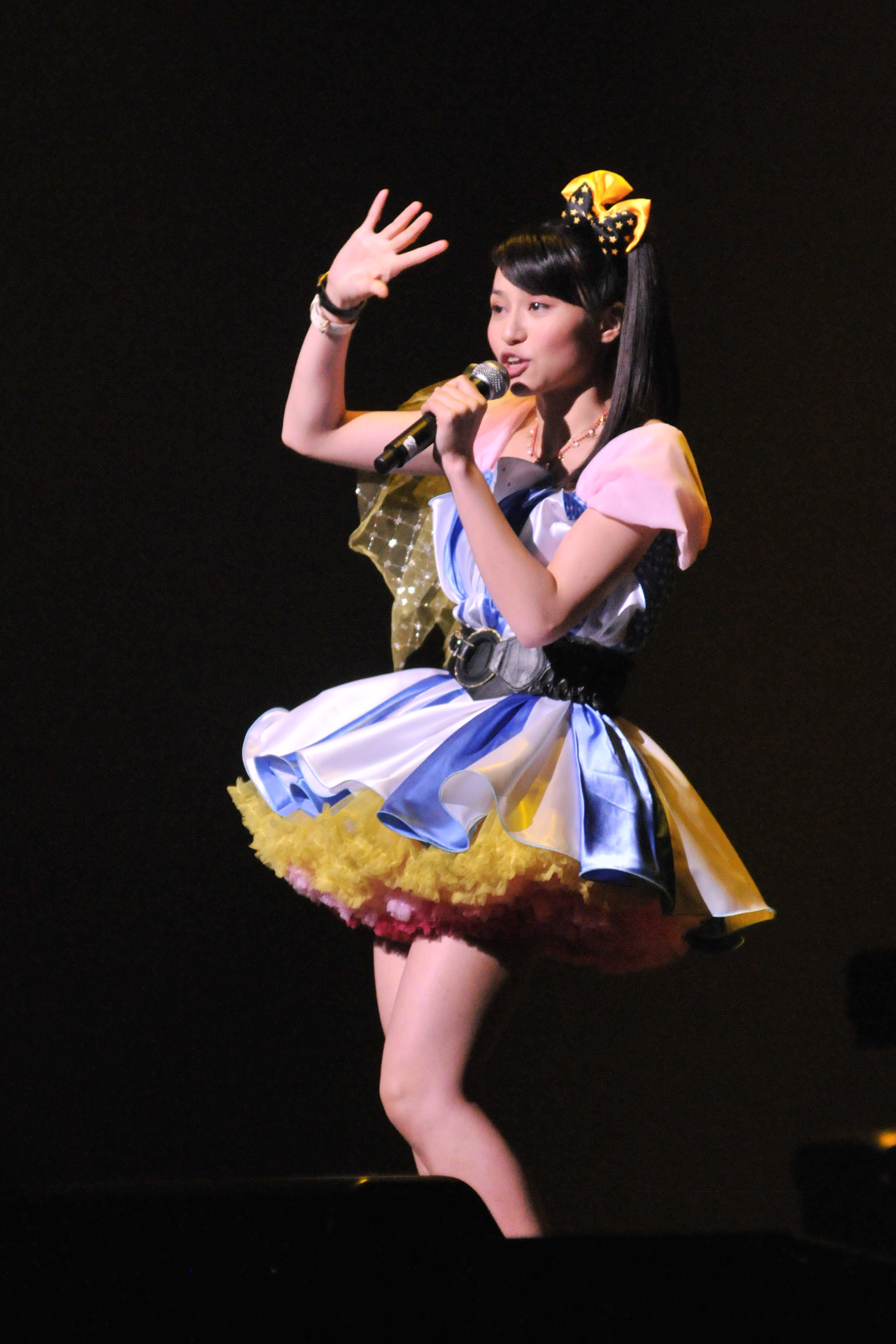
Nakajima Live at LA

Nakajima made her debut performance as a professional artist at the "Macross 25th Anniversary Concert" on April 18, 2007, as she had been cast as the character Ranka Lee. Her first vocal recordings appeared in the compilation album Macross Frontier O.S.T.1 Nyan FRO. on June 4, 2008. She made her music debut on June 25, 2008, with the single "Seikan Hikō" (星間飛行). Her first major live performance was the "Super Dimension Super Live" (超時空スーパーライブ, Chō Jikū Sūpā Raibu) concert held on July 27, 2008. For her performance of "Seikan Hikō", she won the award for Best Musical Performance in the third Seiyu Awards held on March 7, 2009.

Nakajima's first non-Macross single, "Tenshi ni Naritai" (天使になりたい) was released on January 28, 2009; the single peaked at number 13 on Oricon's weekly charts and charted for five weeks. This was followed by the release of her second single "Nostalgia" on March 11, 2009; the title song was used as the theme song to the drama series Daisuki! Itsuitsugo. She then became the vocal provider of the Vocaloid program Megpoid, which went on sale on June 6, 2009. Her next single "Jellyfish no Kokuhaku" (ジェリーフィッシュの告白, Jerīfisshu no Kokuhaku) was released on December 9, 2009; the title song was used as the first ending theme to the anime series Kobato. She released her first album I Love You on June 9, 2010. She then appeared at Anime Expo in Los Angeles in July of that year.

Nakajima's next single "Melody" was released on November 24, 2010; the songs included in the single were used in the original video animation Tamayura. She then performed the song "If", which was used as an insert song in the anime series Moshidora. This was followed by the release of the single "Kamisama no Itazura" (神様のいたずら) on October 26, 2011; the title song is used as the ending theme to the anime series Tamayura: Hitotose. Her next single, "Try Unite!/Hello!" was released on February 2, 2012; "Try Unite" was used as the opening theme to the anime series Lagrange: The Flower of Rin-ne. Her second album Be With You went on sale on March 3, 2012.

On August 1, 2012, Nakajima released the single "Marble/Wasurenai yo." (マーブル/忘れないよ。); "Marble" was used as the opening theme to the second season of Lagrange: The Flower of Rin-ne. In 2013, she released two singles: "Sonna Koto Ura no Mata Urabanashi Desho?" (そんなこと裏のまた裏話でしょ?) on January 23, and "Arigatō" (ありがとう) on August 7. "Sonna Koto Ura no Mata Urabanashi Desho?" was used as the opening theme to the anime series Kotoura-san, and "Arigatō" was used as the ending theme to the anime series Tamayura: More Aggressive.

On December 2, 2013, Stardust Promotion announced that Nakajima would go on an indefinite hiatus from her music career after the release of her third album Thank You on February 26, 2014 and a final concert on March 20, 2014, although she would continue to be active in the voice-acting industry. In a 2019 interview, she was asked the reasons for her decision to go on hiatus. She responded that she felt that had few expectations about herself, and she was worried that she had become so associated with the role of Ranka that she would be unable to establish an identity as "Megumi Nakajima". She initially thought that her involvement in the Macross franchise would not last long and that she could move on after Macross Frontier ended, only to learn later that there would be more upcoming releases and activities for the series. Once the films had finished release, she realized that she had already been a voice actor for three years, and yet felt that her roles did not suit her, even feeling that her confidence was low despite being treated kindly by her peers.

On December 1, 2016, Nakajima's management announced that she would return from her hiatus to perform the song "Watashi no Sekai", which is used as the ending theme to the 2017 anime television series Fuuka. Her second post-comeback single "Saturday Night Question" was released on November 6, 2017; the title song is used as the opening theme to the anime series Recovery of an MMO Junkie.

Nakajima released her fourth album Curiosity on February 26, 2018. She then released the single "Bitter Sweet Harmony/Shiranai Kimochi" on August 1, 2018; the song "Bitter Sweet Harmony" was used as the opening theme to the anime series Miss Caretaker of Sunohara-sou. A planned solo concert in Shanghai, China in June 2018 was cancelled due to "various circumstances". In August 2018, she performed at C3 AFA Indonesia in Jakarta, the last to be held in the country prior to the event's discontinuation. The following month, she performed at Cosplay Mania in the Philippines, the first time she held a performance in the country.

To celebrate the 10th anniversary of her career, Nakajima released a cover album titled Lovely Time Travel (ラブリー・タイム・トラベル) on January 28, 2019; the album consists of covers of various love songs from the 1970s to the 1990s. She released a compilation album titled 30 Pieces of Love on her 30th birthday, June 5, 2019; the limited edition includes a Blu-ray disc featuring a video shot in the Philippines, and a cover of the Filipino song "Kailan".

== Acting career ==
Nakajima's first non-Macross role was Miku in the anime series Akikan!. After that, she was cast as the character Citron in the series Basquash!; she along with Haruka Tomatsu and Saori Hayami performed the series' theme songs under the name Eclipse. She then played the role of Kaede Sakura in Kämpfer, and the roles of Chiho and Chise Mihara in Kobato. At the end of 2009, she voiced Ranka in the first movie of the Macross Frontier series, Macross Frontier the Movie: The False Songstress. In 2010, she played Lyra, a celestial spirit that belongs to Lucy Heartfilia, in the Fairy Tail series, and the character Lyra in Pokémon Diamond and Pearl. In February 2011, she voiced Ranka in the second Macross Frontier movie, Macross Frontier the Movie: The Wings of Goodbye. In 2012, she played the role of Meloetta in the anime theatrical short Meloetta's Moonlight Serenade, later reprising the role in the Pokémon: Black & White television series. She then voiced Yuzuki Eba in the original video animation A Town Where You Live, reprising the role the following year for the anime television series. In 2013, she played the role of Yō Kasukabe in Problem Children Are Coming from Another World, Aren't They?.

During Nakajima's musical hiatus, she continued playing roles in anime series and other franchises, most notably Cure Lovely in HappinessCharge PreCure! and multiple characters in the multimedia franchise Kantai Collection. Following her return to music, she would then play the roles of Charlotte Abelfreyja Drossel in Violet Evergarden, Maiko Osonoi in Miss Caretaker of Sunohara-sou, and Dolphin Mii in Saint Seiya: Saintia Shō. She was originally scheduled to portray the role of Rona Chevalier in the anime series New Life+: Young Again in Another World, but she resigned from the role in the wake of a controversy involving the original light novel's writer; the anime was canceled shortly after.

== Musical style and influences ==
Nakajima cites growing up in a family that appreciated music as one of the factors that made her decide to pursue a singing career. In particular, she remembers being influenced by her father's listening of artists such as Toto, Airplay, Earth, Wind & Fire, and Chaka Khan, as well as her listening to Japanese idols such as Sayuri Iwai. In an interview with the music streaming service ANiUTa, she mentions that she mainly listens to both Japanese and Western music from the 1980s and 1990s.

In a 2008 interview with Famitsu, Nakajima related the circumstances that led to her being cast as Ranka in the Macross franchise. She noted that she initially had a complex with her voice and felt that it was "lacking in personality", which made her reluctant to talk too much. She felt that because she only knew how to use her natural voice, she wondered how she would be able to make the most out of it. When she was informed of Ranka's character, she felt that she could relate to her as she thought that Ranka's personality overlapped with hers. She remembers that when she was informed of her getting the role, she didn't react as it coming out of nowhere, but rather that "she got through".

In interviews with Natalie and LisAni, Nakajima discussed the production of her first post-comeback album Curiosity. She noted that she wanted to do a pop album, and that in contrast to her previous albums, which had the word "You" in their titles, she wanted to go in a different direction because of a "curiosity to try new things". The title and theme of the album came from experiences during her hiatus, which would include watching musicals and desires to learn about other people and other kinds of music. She noted the collaborations she made with various writers for the song's albums: for example, for the song "Life's The Party Time!!", she co-wrote it with composer Kenichi Maeyamada, and compared the experience to "writing diary-like lyrics and answering to them". She also mentions how the song "Zanzō no Avalon" (残像のアヴァロン) sounds like an anime song despite not being used in an anime series.

== Filmography ==
=== Anime ===
List of voice performances in anime
Year	Title	Role	Notes	Source(s)
2008	Macross Frontier	Ranka Lee		
2009	Akikan!	Miku		
2009	Basquash!	Citron		
2009–11	Kämpfer series	Kaede Sakura	Also für die Liebe	
2009	Kobato.	Chiho and Chise Mihara		
2009	Fairy Tail	Lyra		
2009	Pokémon Diamond and Pearl: Galactic Battles	Kotone		
2011	Moshidora	Mari Tamagawa		
2011	Sacred Seven	Aiba Ruri		
2011	Ikoku Meiro no Croisée	Anne		
2011	No. 6	Karan		
2011–13	Phi Brain: Puzzle of God series	Elena Himekawa		
2011	Tamayura series	Hoshi Manami		
2011	Last Exile: Fam, the Silver Wing	Cecily		
2012	Aquarion Evol	Sazanka Bianca		
2012	Lagrange: The Flower of Rin-ne series	Grania		
2012	Saki: Achiga Hen episode of side-A	Arai Sofia		
2012	Pokémon: Black & White	Meloetta		
2012	Busou Shinki	Lene	TV series	
2013	Problem Children Are Coming from Another World, Aren't They?	Yō Kasukabe		
2013	Hakkenden: Eight Dogs of the East	Inumura Hiyokokoromo	2nd series	
2013	A Town Where You Live	Yuzuki Eba		
2014	HappinessCharge PreCure!	Megumi Aino / Cure Lovely, Cure Unlovely		
2018	Violet Evergarden	Charlotte Eberfreya Drossel		
2018	Miss Caretaker of Sunohara-sou	Maiko Osonoi		
2019–present	Ascendance of a Bookworm	Tuuli		
2021	Shaman King	Kororo		

=== Film ===
List of voice performances in film
Year	Title	Role	Notes	Source(s)
2009	Macross Frontier: Itsuwari no Utahime	Ranka Lee		
2011	Macross Frontier: Sayonara no Tsubasa	Ranka Lee		
2012	Meloetta's Moonlight Serenade	Meloetta		
2014	Pretty Cure All Stars New Stage 3: Eternal Friends	Megumi Aino / Cure Lovely		
2014	HappinessCharge PreCure! the Movie: The Ballerina of the Land of Dolls	Megumi Aino / Cure Lovely		
2015	Pretty Cure All Stars: Spring Carnival	Megumi Aino / Cure Lovely		
2016	Pretty Cure All Stars: Singing with Everyone♪ Miraculous Magic!	Megumi Aino / Cure Lovely		
2018	Hugtto! PreCure Futari wa Pretty Cure: All Stars Memories	Megumi Aino / Cure Lovely		
2020	Words Bubble Up Like Soda Pop	Julie		
2021	Macross Frontier short film: Labyrinth of time	Ranka Lee		

=== Video games ===
List of voice performances in video games
Year	Title	Role	Notes	Source(s)
2009	Hayate no Gotoku!! Nightmare Paradise	Watarase Mikage	PSP	
2009	Macross Ultimate Frontier	Ranka Lee	PSP	
2010	Busō Shinki Battle Masters	Altlene	PSP	
2010	Another Century's Episode: R	Ranka Lee	PS3	
2011	Macross Triangle Frontier	Ranka Lee	PSP	
2013	Super Robot Wars Operation Extend	Ranka Lee	PSP	
2013	Kantai Collection	Mikuma, Kinugasa, I-168 (Imuya), I-58 (Goya), Hatsuzuki	Web browser	
2014	HappinessCharge PreCure! Kawarun ☆ collection	Megumi Aino / Cure Lovely	3DS	
2025	Genshin Impact	Ineffa		

=== Other dubs ===
List of voice performances in drama CDs and other productions
Year	Title	Role	Notes	Source
2008	Nyan Dra 1	Ranka Lee	Macross Frontier drama CD (VTCL-60102)	
2009	Nyan Dra 2	Ranka Lee	Macross Frontier drama CD (VTCL-60103)	
2009	Nyan Dra 3	Ranka Lee	Macross Frontier drama CD (VTCL-60104)	
2009	Nyan Dra 4	Ranka Lee	Macross Frontier drama CD (VTCL-60105)	
2023	Marriage Contract	Seo Na-yoon	TV Osaka dub	
2024	Voltes V: Legacy: Super Electromagnetic Edition	Jamie Robinson	Japanese dub	

== Discography ==
- I Love You (2010)
- Be with You (2012)
- Thank You (2014)
- Curiosity (2018)
- Lovely Time Travel (2019)
- 30 Pieces of Love (2019)
- Green Diary (2021)

== DVDs and Blu-ray ==
- Nakajima Megumi Spring Festival 2009 ~Mamegu Wasshoi! Haru Matsuri in Akasaka Blitz~ (中島愛 スプリングイベント2009～まめぐだワッショイ! 春祭in赤坂ブリッツ～) (July 15, 2009)
- Macross Frontier Galaxy Tour FINAL in Budokan (マクロスF(フロンティア)ギャラクシーツアーFINAL in ブドーカン) with Yoko Kanno and May'n (October 30, 2009 [DVD], November 27, 2009 [Blu-ray])
