= Robotech 3000 =

Cancelled American animated television series

- Directed by: Carl Macek
- Written by: Carl Macek
- Produced by: Jason Netter
- Distributed by: Funimation
- Release dates: 2000 (proposed); 2007 (DVD extra)
- Running time: 3 minutes (trailer only)
- Language: English

Robotech 3000 was Harmony Gold's attempt to revive the Robotech franchise before the turn of the millennium. After the relative success of Voltron: The Third Dimension and Roughnecks: Starship Troopers Chronicles, a new Robotech sequel was proposed that would use 3D CG visuals, with producer Jason Netter and original Robotech writer Carl Macek at the helm.

== Story and development ==
The story was based during an era of peace under an interplanetary federation nearly a thousand years after the final episode of Robotech. At the time of development in 1998, Harmony Gold did not have the rights to create a sequel to any of the three Japanese series that they had licensed from Tatsunoko Production, which included Super Dimension Fortress Macross, Super Dimension Cavalry Southern Cross, and Genesis Climber MOSPEADA. Both the time setting as well as the CG animation of this project ensured that it would not resemble a sequel to any of the Tatsunoko Production licensed series.

Harmony Gold brought on former Robotech producer Carl Macek in a freelance capacity to write a 3-minute trailer presentation, a script for a pilot episode, and a series bible outlining 13 episodes. In May 1999, both Harmony Gold and Carl Macek registered a copyright for the script of the pilot titled "And so it beings," written in 1998. Only the trailer presentation was ever produced.

In the trailer, the starship Corsair is commanded by Captain Noble with Lt. Suzy Kramer at the helm as they respond to a distress call on a mining planet. They quickly lose communications with their landing party on the surface, composed of Brent Hawkins, Lorna Cassidy and the alien Arroq. As the party works to re-establish communications with the Corsair, an unmanned mechanical excavator suddenly becomes sentient and attacks them, which they narrowly escape.

Some of the new concepts presented were Veritech Excavators and Proteus-group starships. None of the trademark anime-look and transformable mecha of the earlier series were seen, although what resembles a Veritech fighter can be seen in early pre-production artwork. The character Arroq was a member of the alien race known as the Spherisians, seen in adaptations of Robotech II: The Sentinels.

The trailer also featured returning cast members from the original Robotech series, including Richard Epcar, Rebecca Forsdadt, Edie Mirman, and Dan Woren.

The response to the Robotech 3000 promotional trailer at the 2000 FanimeCon anime convention was disastrous. Much of the negative feedback concerned the distinctive artistic style of the original anime series were going to be replaced by generic CGI characters in a style that resembled ReBoot. By the 2000 San Diego Comic-Con, it was revealed that the CG project had been cancelled, not only due to negative feedback from fans but also because American animation studio Netter Digital, which had been hired to produce the project, had gone bankrupt earlier that year.

During that same San Diego Comic-Con panel in 2000, Carl Macek revealed that an attempt was being made to salvage the series as an anime-style production with Tatsunoko Production. Revealing that this new anime was going to now be set 700 or 800 years in the future, Macek said that no deal had been signed and that the earliest it could premiere would be 2002. The official Robotech website later posted character concept art for this series.

In 2002 Harmony Gold re-gained the rights to create a Robotech sequel based on elements from Super Dimension Cavalry Southern Cross and Genesis Climber MOSPEADA (but not Super Dimension Fortress Macross) and abandoned Robotech 3000 in order to pursue development on Robotech: The Shadow Chronicles.

The story seen in the trailer was revisited in the Robotech series from Titan Comics in 2019, which was a multiverse story arc. With its universe being designated as "Protoverse-113", brief appearances are made characters Lt. Kramer and Captain Noble, as well as the Corsair ship.

== Home video ==
The Robotech 3000 trailer was released as part of a collector's edition DVD of Robotech: The Shadow Chronicles on November 20, 2007.

On April 1, 2002, the Robotech website posted an April Fool's joke announcing a fictitious Robotech 3000 DVD set. The article was posted saying that the DVD set was already sold out.
