= Invid =

== Fact ==
- InVID Project (invid-project.eu), funded by European Union, develops tools to verify video content spread via social media, see Applications of artificial intelligence#Deep-fakes

== Fiction ==
The Invid (sometimes Invids) is either of two distinct fictional, villainous groups:

- Invid (Robotech), an alien species from the Robotech TV series universe
- The Invids, a group of pirates from the Star Wars expanded universe.
