= Robotech (TV series) =

1985 animated series

- Title screen from the 1985 broadcast
- Genre: Epic; Mecha; Space opera
- Created by: Carl Macek
- Based on: Part 1; Super Dimension Fortress Macross; (by Studio Nue); Part 2; Super Dimension Cavalry Southern Cross; Part 3; Genesis Climber MOSPEADA
- Screenplay by: see list: Ardwight Chamberlain; Greg Finley; Steve Flood; Jason Klassi; Steve Kramer; Mike Reynolds; Gregory Snegoff; Jim Wager; Tao Will; Uncredited: Winston Richard; Tom Wyner
- Story by: Carl Macek
- Directed by: Robert V. Barron; Ippei Kuri; Uncredited: Noboru Ishiguro; Yasuo Hasegawa; Katsuhisa Yamada (Note: Ippei Kuri is listed in the credits to Robotech as "Director" of the "original animation"; however, Ishiguro, Hasegawa and Yamada were the actual directors of Macross, Southern Cross and Mospeada respectively. At the time Macross, Southern Cross and Mospeada were produced, Kuri's brother Kenji Yoshida was the head of Tatsunoko Production (credited as "producer" of the "original animation" in Robotech), but Kuri has no credit involvement whatsoever.)
- Starring: (see below)
- Narrated by: J. Jay Smith
- Theme music composer: Ulpio Minucci
- Composer: Ulpio Minucci
- Countries of origin: United States; Japan (o.v.)
- No. of series: 3
- No. of episodes: 85 (list of episodes)

Production
- Producers: Carl Macek; Ahmed Agrama
- Animator: Tatsunoko Production
- Running time: 25 minutes
- Production companies: Harmony Gold USA; Uncredited: Studio Nue; Artland; Artmic

Original release
- Network: First-run syndication
- Release: March 4 – June 28, 1985

Related
- Codename: Robotech; Robotech: The Movie; Robotech II: The Sentinels; Robotech: The Shadow Chronicles; Robotech: Love Live Alive

Robotech is a space opera animated television series created by Carl Macek for Harmony Gold USA. It aired in broadcast syndication from March 4 to June 28, 1985, comprising 85 episodes. Set over a four-decade period, the series follows three alien invasions of Earth prompted by humanity's discovery of an extraterrestrial scientific advancement known as Robotechnology.

The series was developed by adapting three unrelated anime into a single story. The first part is based on Super Dimension Fortress Macross, the second is based on Super Dimension Cavalry Southern Cross, and the third is based on Genesis Climber MOSPEADA. Each anime serves as the basis of the three Robotech wars depicted in the series.

== Background ==
Robotech was one of the first anime televised in the United States that attempted to include most of the complexity and drama of its original Japanese source material. Produced by Harmony Gold USA in association with Tatsunoko, Robotech is a story adapted with edited content and revised dialogue from the animation of three different mecha anime series: The Super Dimension Fortress Macross from 1982, Super Dimension Cavalry Southern Cross from 1984, and Genesis Climber Mospeada from 1983. Harmony Gold's cited reasoning for combining these unrelated series was its decision to market Macross for US-American weekday syndication television, which required a minimum of 65 episodes at the time (thirteen weeks at five episodes per week). Macross and the two other series each had fewer episodes than required since they originally aired in Japan as a weekly series.

== Plot ==
In the year 1999, an alien battle fortress crash lands on an island in the South Pacific. Over the next ten years, mankind repairs and refits this fortress, using the advanced "robotechnology" found aboard to create fighter planes that can transform into giant robots. As soon as the repaired fortress is ready for launch, the aliens to whom it belongs finally discover it's location. Thus begins a series of wars that will devastate the planet Earth

== Production history ==
Harmony Gold hired American writers to adapt the scripts of the three Japanese series. This complicated process was supervised by producer Carl Macek, a pioneer of the anime industry in the United States.

This combination resulted in a storyline that spans three generations as mankind must fight three destructive Robotech Wars in succession over a powerful energy source called "Protoculture":

- The First Robotech War (The Macross Saga) concerns humanity's discovery of a crashed alien ship and subsequent battle against a race of giant warriors called the Zentraedi, who have been sent to retrieve the ship for reasons unknown. In the course of this chapter, Earth is nearly annihilated, the Zentraedi are defeated, and humans gain knowledge of the energy source called protoculture. Humanity also learns of the Robotech Masters whose galactic empire the Zentraedi protected and patrolled.
- The Second Robotech War (The Masters) focuses on the arrival in Earth orbit of the Robotech Masters, who have come seeking what turns out to be the sole means in the universe of producing protoculture. Through a combination of mistrust and arrogance, their attempts at retrieving this meet with opposition from the humans and unleash a war that leaves the Masters defeated and Earth awash in the spores of a plant called the Flower of Life—the source of protoculture and a beacon to the mysterious Invid who scour the galaxy for its presence.
- The Third Robotech War (The New Generation) begins with the arrival on Earth of the Invid, who are lured by the Flower of Life and rapidly conquer the planet. References in the previous two chapters explain to viewers that many of the heroes of the First Robotech War had left Earth to seek out the Robotech Masters on a preemptive mission, and it is this Robotech Expeditionary Force that sends missions back from across the galaxy to attempt a liberation of their homeworld. The storyline follows one group of freedom fighters as they work their way towards the final battle with the Invid.

=== Codename: Robotech ===
Codename: Robotech is a 73-minute animated pilot that preceded the series. It is set within the events of the First Robotech War. It was a greatly extended version of Gloval's Report, the fourteenth television episode that summarizes the beginning of the series. It was aired on some television stations before the broadcast of the series in 1985. It was included on DVD as an extra with the first volume of the Robotech Legacy Collection and the complete Protoculture Collection, from ADV Films. The disc includes the option of audio commentary by producer Carl Macek and was also released in Australia by Madman Entertainment.

== Television broadcast ==
=== North American television debut ===
Robotech originally aired in 1985 in first-run syndication, meaning it was sold directly to local television stations without having been run on a network first—this was part of a trend in animation in the 1980s. Previously, local stations would rerun theatrical cartoons like Looney Tunes or shows that had previously aired on network TV on Saturday mornings. This changed after He-Man and the Masters of the Universe introduced a new economic model: shows sold directly for first-run to stations, driving and funded by sales of related toys. Though the original Robotech series did well in ratings, the attempt to cash in on toys may have doomed Robotech II: The Sentinels as the original series attracted older viewers, not necessarily the children targeted by the toy line. The failure of the Matchbox toy line is cited as a primary reason for the cancellation of the Sentinels series.

=== International broadcast ===
In Australia, Robotech was aired from April 12, 1986, to and throughout 1988 and 1995 by both the Ten and Seven Networks and various regional stations in different states (including RTQ7, AMV4 and GRV6). Ten cut the series at episode 52 (Love Song), while Seven broadcast all 85 episodes. In 2018, also in Australia, Network Ten multichannel Eleven started airing the Macross Saga.

In Italy, Robotech was originally aired in late 1986 on Rete 4; it was later syndicated on Italia 7.

In France, Robotech was originally broadcast by La Cinq during the summer of 1987; the show moved to TF1 in 1991.

The Philippine network GMA-7 aired the Masters and New Generation episodes in the late 1980s (as RPN-9 aired Macross in the early 1980s), as part of the late-afternoon weekday animation block (together with Captain Harlock).

The Hong Kong cable television channel Star Plus (now Star World) aired all 85 episodes, from May 1994 to January 1995, with changes in time-slots (May-early October 1994, 11:00 a.m. Sundays; October 1994-January 1995, 5:30 p.m. Weekdays). The series was broadcast in a number of European countries by the then Super Channel during the 1980s.

In the UK, Robotech aired on The Children's Channel in the mid to late 1980s, and it was transmitted on Prem1ere, the satellite movie channel, in the same period.

In Spain, all Robotech episodes were aired using the Latin American Dubbing, from August 1990 to April 1991, with changes in time slots, in Telecinco channel. The series was aired again in the same channel from October 1993 to May 1994. At that time only The Macross Saga and The Robotech Masters Saga were aired, leaving the third part of the show unaired.

In Russia on the TV channel 2x2 a dubbed version in Russian was shown in 1992. In the spring of 2012, there was a rerun on the TV channel 2x2 with a new dubbed version.

The Dubai-based channel MBC 3 began broadcasting an Arabic-language dubbed version in early 2010.

In Yugoslavia, 14 dubbed episodes were aired in 1990 on RTB. A sticker album was also released by Forum Marketprint.

=== Subsequent airings ===
Robotech appeared on the Sci-Fi Channel in 1993, and on Cartoon Network's Toonami in 1998. Toonami aired only episodes 1 through 60, finishing the run at the end of the Robotech Masters story-line. Toonami reran 3 selected episodes of Robotech as part of the Giant Robot Week in 2003. Superstation KTEH, a PBS public television station in San Jose, California, as part of its Sunday Late-Prime (9pm-after 12) Sci-Fi programming line-up aired the "Macross" and "New Generation" storylines, as well as the Robotech II: The Sentinels feature. Robotech formerly aired daily on The Anime Network. As of January 7, 2007, the show also airs in Canada on Space and Retro. As of 2017, all three storyline sagas of Robotech are currently available for streaming on Netflix. Internet based Pluto TV, a Paramount Global subsidiary, began showing all three Robotech stories Summer of 2019 on the Anime All Day channel. They appeared in their original Japanese format as Macross, Southern Cross and Genesis Climber Mospeada.

== Critical reception ==
The series has attained a significant cult-following over the years along with critical appraisal; in 2009, IGN ranked Robotech as the 34th greatest animated show of all time in their Top 100 list.

In 1996, Hyper magazine reviewed The Macross Saga, rating it 10 out of 10.

== Home media ==
- Family Home Entertainment (FHE) first attempted to release one episode per VHS tape, but only got through a handful of early episodes before abandoning this approach. In 1987, the company then heavily edited the 36-episode Macross Saga portion into six feature-length tapes, cutting out episode introductions and nudity in shower scenes, and ignoring the Southern Cross and New Generation series entirely. A third VHS run finally succeeded at releasing the entire series with two uncut episodes per tape, over a total of 42 volumes. The Macross Saga and The Masters were also released on Laserdisc in 1993 and 1994, respectively. Each Laserdisc contained four uncut episodes.
- Palladium Books, past and current publishers of the Robotech role-playing game, was the first company to release Southern Cross, New Generation, and Robotech II: The Sentinels on VHS home video. These VHS videos were available via mail-order, as well as some direct-market game and hobby shops.
- Streamline Pictures, founded by Macek after the end of Robotech, released Robotech II: The Sentinels on VHS and Laserdisc after the Palladium Books releases went out of print. In 1994, Streamline Pictures also released an incomplete series of "Perfect Collection" VHS videos. Each volume included two episodes of Robotech after their corresponding episodes of Macross, Southern Cross, or Mospeada, completely uncut but inaccurately subtitled. This series allowed English-speaking viewers to see many of the changes made.
- GameTek Cinema released the first episode of Robotech on CD-ROM in 1994. This uncut episode was encoded in QuickTime 2.0 format at a video resolution of 320x226. The episode contained a marginally different arrangement of background music.
- AnimEigo, a specialty anime company, released the original Japanese Super Dimension Fortress Macross TV series on DVD in 2001 with subtitles and unedited in its pre-Robotech form. The footage was extensively restored from the original film stock by Shin Kurokawa, making this the most pristine release of Super Dimension Fortress Macross outside Japan. The final DVD of the series also contains commentary by chief director Noburo Ishiguro.
- ADV Films, an American distributor of anime, began releasing the entire series on DVD in 2001, typically with six episodes per disc. The first box sets of the series (dubbed the Robotech Legacy Collection) included extra discs with special features ranging from Robotech II: The Sentinels to pre-Robotech dubs of the first Macross and Mospeada episodes. Complete collection box-sets were also released, containing all the episodes of each of the three Robotech sagas, minus the extras discs.
  - The restoration of the original Super Dimension Fortress Macross TV series led to speculation among fans that the remastered footage could also be used to create a similarly remastered version of Robotech. However, Carl Macek stated that a remaster would be impossible at the time because they lacked the necessary source materials, including edit-decision lists, unmixed audio elements, and restored video elements for Southern Cross and Mospeada, as well as for Macross. Some of this (the audio elements and edit-lists) had been destroyed in a flood in the early 1990s; some of it (remastered footage for the other two series) had never been available to begin with. But in 2002, a set of off-site audio backup tapes was discovered to include the missing audio elements, and in 2003 ADV delayed its release of the subtitled Super Dimension Cavalry Southern Cross and Genesis Climber Mospeada series by several months in order to remaster them, as well. With the remastered footage and audio elements available, ADV were able to forego needing the edit-decision lists by commissioning the same video production company that had originally edited Robotech to create a new edit of the show. Robotech: Remastered included the restoration of some scenes previously cut from the original Robotech release to conform to broadcast standards and broadcast length requirements, new opening/ending sequences, 5.1 Dolby surround sound with rerecorded sound effects, and new eyecatch sequences.
  - Robotech: Remastered is not without its share of controversy. Some fans were upset by the reversal of ADV's position on a remastered Robotech, feeling betrayed because they purchased the expensive Legacy Collection during the time ADV was insisting that there would be no remaster, and that this would be the best way Robotech would ever be seen on DVD. Other fans feel that the new 5.1 mix is overly loud and lacks subtlety; they prefer the unremastered version of the series, because it represents the Robotech that they love and remember as it first aired on television without the distraction of new sound effects. Also, the extent of the new footage is limited to sequences that did not require newly recorded dialogue (though other cut scenes are included, in the original Japanese, on one of the Legacy Collection extras discs). The video quality suffers slightly by comparison to AnimEigo's Macross DVDs: ADV includes six episodes per Robotech disc to AnimEigo's four per disc of Macross, meaning that more compression is necessary, and therefore more compression artifacts appear. However, there is little question that the audio and video quality are substantially improved over the prior Robotech DVD release, and Robotech fans would likely prefer having had two different DVD versions released than none at all.
  - In 2003, the original Super Dimension Cavalry Southern Cross and Genesis Climber Mospeada series were released subtitled on DVD in their original Japanese language by ADV Films.
  - Finally, in 2005, ADV released yet another box set, Robotech: The Protoculture Collection, containing all the Robotech: Remastered DVDs plus the seven extras discs from the Legacy Collection in one thin-pack box. Detractors criticize these DVD re-releases as part of an industry trend to entice buyers to "double-dip", or buy more than one edition of the same DVD.
  - Nevertheless, ADV Films announced at Anime Expo 2005 that they would be creating an uncut dub for Macross, with the original Japanese voice actress Mari Iijima reprising her role as Minmei. This six-volume release has been completed, with the first volume being released on January 10, 2006, and the final volume being released on December 19, 2006. However, this dub did not utilize the same voice actors used in Robotech.
- Manga Entertainment started to release Robotech on DVD as two-disc sets in the UK in late 2005. These sets are essentially the same as the Robotech: Remastered release from the US, but in different packaging.
- Madman Entertainment released an Australian Region 4 version of the Robotech Legacy Collection boxed sets starting in November 2002 with Volume One, and ending with Volume Seven in May 2003; the Australian version almost identical to the original US release, except for not repeating the "gold box" mistake.
  - Claiming for a long time there wasn't enough demand for subtitled-only DVD releases, Madman eventually chose to test the waters with the release of the Japanese Macross series in March 2004. It was successful enough to secure the release of Southern Cross in July and Genesis Climber Mospeada in October of the same year. All three series are released in their own Madman-designed box, and bear little resemblance to the US releases; many fans preferring the Madman Macross box design over the various US versions.
  - When initially asked about the possibility of an Australian release of Robotech: Remastered, Madman claimed that it would not be cost-effective or profitable with the Legacy Collection already in the market, only to change their tune and release the Robotech 20th Anniversary Remastered Extended Edition, a single box with all 14 discs, in June 2005. The recommended retail price for this box was only a little more than that of two of Madman Legacy Collection boxes.
  - Continuing to follow the ADV Films trend, Madman announced the release of an Australian version of Robotech: The Protoculture Collection in November 2007, again with an RRP only a little more than the preceding 20th Anniversary set.
- A&E Networks Home Entertainment picked up the video distribution rights to Robotech following ADV's closure in 2009 and re-released the series on DVD in 2011, based on ADV's remastered version of the series. Their release includes many of the special features of ADV's Legacy and Protoculture collections as well as new features, including a documentary, Carl Macek's Robotech Universe, an edited version of Robotech II: The Sentinels (which omits the Macross flashback scenes) and a 29-minute version of Robotech: The Movie (which does not include the Megazone 23 footage, as Harmony Gold USA no longer has the rights to that series). This release was duplicated by Go Entertainment for a Region 2 release in the UK and Beyond Home Entertainment for a Region 4 release in Australia, after Manga Entertainment and Madman Entertainment respectively lost the distribution rights. An advantage that the Beyond Home version presents over A&E and Go Entertainment's versions is that it also includes Love Live Alive. The 2013 A&E re-release of the boxset also contains it.
- Funimation announced in October 2019 that they have licensed the Robotech series, Robotech: The Shadow Chronicles and Robotech II: The Sentinels. Funimation began streaming them on August 24, 2021. They released the TV series on Blu-ray and digitally in a collector's edition box set in September 2021, and in three parts from September to December 2021.

== Original series cast and crew ==
=== English-language cast ===
- Robert Axelrod (as "Axel Roberts") – Rico
- Arlene Banas (as "Celena Banas")
- Robert V. Barron – Admiral Donald Hayes
- Emilie Brown (as "Mary Cobb") – Annie "Mint" LaBelle
- Bill Capizzi (as "A. Gregory") – Robotech Masters, Konda
- Frank Catalano (as "Anthony Wayne") – Rand, Bobby, Dennis Brown
- Cam Clarke (as "Jimmy Flinders") – Max Sterling, Lance Belmont
- Tony Clay (as "Jonathan Alexander") – Breetai
- Lara Cody (as "Deanna Morris") – Kim Young, Jason
- Andre L. Cornell (as "Larry Abraham") – Bowie Grant
- Richard Epcar – Ben Dixon, Lunk, Grel, Captain Vince Grant
- Greg Finley (as "Guy Garret") – Henry Gloval, General Anatole Leonard
- Sam Fontana – Bron
- Rebecca Forstadt (as "Reba West") – Lynn Minmei
- Eddie Frierson – Lynn Kyle
- Barbara Goodson (as "Shirley Roberts") – Marie Crystal, Sera
- Melora Harte (as "Chelsea Victoria") – Musica
- Alexandra Kenworthy (as "Sandra Snow") – Azonia, The Invid Regiss
- Steve Kramer (as "Drew Thomas") – Angelo Dante
- Ted Lehmann (as "Leonard Pike") – Exedore
- Wendee Lee (as "Wendee Swan") – Vanessa Leeds
- Robin Levenson – Sammie Porter
- Susie London – Rook Bartley
- Melanie MacQueen (as "Aline Leslie") – Lisa Hayes, Marlene Rush, Ariel
- Kerrigan Mahan – Sean Phillips
- Michael McConnohie (as "Jeffrey Platt") – Rolf Emerson
- Noelle McGrath
- David Millbern – Louie Nichols
- Edie Mirman (as "Penny Sweet") – Miriya Parina Sterling, Nova Satori
- Iona Morris (as "Brittany Harlow") – Claudia Grant
- Melissa Newman – Dana Sterling
- Tony Oliver – Rick Hunter
- Mike Reynolds – Dolza, Senator Russo
- J. Jay Smith – Narrator
- Gregory Snegoff (as "Greg Snow") – Khyron, Colonel Fredricks, Scott Bernard, Dr. Lang, Mayor
- Mike Sorich – Sparks
- Paul St. Peter – Zor Prime, Corg, Romy
- Dan Woren (as "Donn Warner") – Roy Fokker
- Tom Wyner (as "Thomas Wyner") – Jonathan Wolfe

=== Executive and creative staff ===
- Ahmed Agrama – Executive Producer
- Jehan Agrama – Associate Producer
- Debbie Alba – Dialogue Director
- Robert V. Barron – Supervising Director / Writer / Dialogue Director
- Ardwight Chamberlain – Writer
- Greg Finley – Writer / Dialogue Director
- Kent Hayes – Production Manager
- Jason Klassi – Writer
- Steve Kramer – Script Editor / Writer / Dialogue Director
- Carl Macek – Producer / Story Editor
- Mike Reynolds – Writer / Dialogue Director
- Gregory Snegoff – Script Editor / Writer / Dialogue Director
- Tao Will – Writer

=== Production crew ===
- Jorge Allia – Transfer
- Leonardo Araujo – Recording Engineer
- George Bours – Recording Engineer
- Guillermo Coelho – Video Tape Engineer
- John Reiner – Recording Engineer
- Bryan J. Rusenko – Chief Engineer
- Eduardo Torres – Recording Engineer
- Gerardo Valdez – Transfer
- Joel Valentine – Final Re-Recording

=== Music staff ===
- Julian Costas aka Claudio Costa – Composer / Songwriter / Arranger / Producer
- Michael Bradley – Composer / Songwriter / Lancer's Singing Voice
- Alberto Ruben Estevez – Music Composer
- Ulpio Minucci – Composer / Main Theme
- John Mortarotti – Music Editor
- Arlon Ober – Composer / Arranger / Songwriter
- Reba West – Minmei's Singing Voice
- Thomas A. White – Executive Music Producer

Since Robotech was a non-union project, many of the voice actors involved worked under pseudonyms to avoid trouble with their union. The voice-actor list printed in Robotech Art One lists the pseudonyms rather than the real names of most of the actors.

== Continuing after the original series ==
- Harmony Gold attempted to produce several follow ups to the original series, most notably Robotech II: The Sentinels. The project fell through due to problems with toy licensing and changes in the Japanese yen-US Dollar exchange rate, among other reasons. The Sentinels saga continued to be chronicled in the novelizations by Jack McKinney and comic book adaptations by the Waltrip brothers.
- A poor screen-test at the Robotech: The Movie screening in Texas led to Cannon Films pulling the feature from release in 1986, getting a very limited home video release in Europe.
- A disastrous reception by the fans to the Robotech 3000 trailer in 2000 prompted Harmony Gold to cancel the project before any more footage was completed. In addition, Netter Digital, the animation producers of the trailer, went bankrupt shortly afterward.
- Robotech: The Shadow Chronicles was first announced at Anime Expo 2004 as the latest incarnation of the Robotech saga. Unlike previous attempts, the movie was a direct continuation of the original series' last episode. The first teaser trailer debuted one year later at Anime Expo 2005 for the 20th anniversary of Robotech. The 88-minute movie premiered at various film festivals in 2006 and a limited theatrical run in January 2007, but the DVD release was delayed until February 6, 2007, the film's reception was very mixed.
- Robotech: Shadow Rising was a proposed sequel to the Shadow Chronicles that was originally intended to be released in 2009. Pre-production ceased after Harmony Gold could not reach an agreement with FUNimation Entertainment. The Shadow Rising trademark has been abandoned since 2010.
- Warner Bros. and Material Pictures licensed the film rights to Robotech and were reportedly considering the production of a live-action adaptation. Tobey Maguire (Spider-Man and Seabiscuit) "is eyeing the lead role" and were to serve as the film's producer.
- Robotech: Love Live Alive is a co-production between Harmony Gold and Tatsunoko Production, released in July 2013. It is based on the OVA Genesis Climber MOSPEADA: Love Live Alive, but also includes new material.
- Robotech: Academy was a planned crowd-funded TV pilot based on an idea by the late series' creator Carl Macek. The Kickstarter project ran from July to August 2014, but was prematurely cancelled after funding fell significantly short of its goal.
