= Robotech: Prelude to the Shadow Chronicles =

Comic book mini-series

- Cover to Robotech: Prelude to the Shadow Chronicles #2. Art by Omar Dogan.

Publication information
- Publisher: DC Comics/Wildstorm
- Schedule: Monthly
- Format: Limited series
- Publication date: October 2005 - January 2006
- No. of issues: 5
- Main characters: Rick Hunter, Lisa Hunter, Vince Grant

Creative team
- Written by: Tommy Yune, the Waltrip brothers
- Penciller(s): Omar Dogan, the Waltrip brothers
- Inker(s): Omar Dogan, the Waltrip brothers

Collected editions
- Robotech: Prelude to the Shadow Chronicles: ISBN 978-1401228163

Robotech: Prelude to the Shadow Chronicles is a five-part comic book mini-series written by Tommy Yune along with the Waltrip brothers, who were previously the art-and-writing team of the Robotech II: The Sentinels comic series. It was published under DC Comics' Wildstorm imprint. It bridges the gap between The Sentinels and the new movie Robotech: The Shadow Chronicles, and also features characters from the Robotech Masters Saga. The series is important, in that it provides an explanation and deepened background for many of the events seen on screen in the movie, and clears up many apparent contradictions within the original animation.

== Plot ==
The story of Prelude to the Shadow Chronicles focuses on the betrayal of the Robotech Expeditionary Force by T. R. Edwards, as he defects to the side of the Invid Regent. The story begins with the REF's Plenipotentiary Council ordering the arrest of Edwards, and Admiral Rick Hunter leads a team down to Tirol to arrest Edwards for treason, only to find that Edwards has already cleared out his facility in Tiresia, kidnapped Lynn Minmei, and killed her cousin Lynn-Kyle. The REF forces are attacked by Invid Inorganics, and Edwards launches offplanet in a newly developed battlecruiser, the Icarus.

Rick alerts Admiral Lisa Hunter, in command of the SDF-3, of the development, and Lisa attempts to prevent Edwards from leaving, but the SDF-3 is unable to get a lock on his ship or his Ghost Squadron fighters, which are using newly developed Shadow technology that makes them invisible to the REF's sensors. As Edwards' ship moves to escape, the Invid Regent's Supercarrier unfolds nearby, confirming the REF suspicions that Edwards has allied with the Invid. The DF-3 prepares to attack but the Supercarrier is able to fire first - the blast shears off the front sections of the SDF-3 and causes extensive damage. The Supercarrier and the Icarus engage their fold drives and escape, with the REF unable to follow. Lisa is seriously injured in the attack, but is soon stabilized and taken downplanet to Tirol for recovery. A few days later, Dr. Jean Grant and her husband, Captain Vince Grant, meet with Rick to tell him that Lisa will survive. Rick, thankful for the news, states that he was looking forward to Lisa resigning her commission after she found out she was pregnant with their first child. It is then that Jean is forced to tell Rick that Lisa's injuries were so severe that she has miscarried, causing Rick to nearly collapse in shock and sadness. The tragedy takes its toll on Rick and Lisa – in the year it takes for the REF to rebuild, Rick's once-black hair turns grey, and Lisa is still in a wheelchair with braces on her legs.

Back on Tirol, Dr. Emil Lang and his android assistant Janice Em try to investigate the Shadow technology, which is making Edwards' ships impossible to detect. The Sentinel races pledge to help the REF rebuild and prepare for their next encounter with the Invid. Particularly the Karbarrans, who help rebuild the fleet, and the Haydonites, an advanced cybernetic race, help to reverse-engineer the Shadow technology. One year later, Vince Grant leads the newly refitted heavy cruiser Tokugawa against Edwards and the Regent at Optera. Lisa and Rick are still struggling with the death of their unborn child, but nonetheless find the strength to continue to lead the REF in its efforts to track down and stop Edwards. Both focus on the rebuilding and refitting of the SDF-3.

Upon reaching Optera, the Tokugawa is severely damaged by a surprise attack by the Icarus. Edwards uses the battle as a chance to dispose of the Regent and Breetai while they are engaged combat. The death of the Regent gives him and his living computer control over all of the Invid forces. Grant's ship is left crashing into Optera's atmosphere. Edwards rounds up the survivors, including Vince, and brings them to the Invid hive, where he reveals his plan to use the Regent's army to "liberate" the Earth from the Invid Regis. Rick arrives in the now-rebuilt and upgraded SDF-3, and leads a team to rescue Minmei and the survivors of Grant's party. They capture Lazlo Zand and rescue Minmei, but Edwards is pushed into the Genesis Pit by Janice, where he and the living computer are fused and mutated into one monstrous being. Janice tells the rest of the team to escape, and uses herself as a beacon for the SDF-3 to lock onto it with its syncro-cannons to destroy the Edwards-creature. Just before the SDF-3 fires, Janice uploads herself to a new body created by Lang and the Haydonites so she can act as a liaison, but the upgrade is only partial, and Janice's memory is damaged. The Edwards creature is destroyed in the blast.

From Edwards, the REF gets the Neutron-S missiles, which the Haydonites help them to replicate. After conferring with his officers, Rick orders all available REF forces to assemble at Moon Base ALUCE to prepare for a one final assault on Earth to dislodge the Invid with the use of the new Shadow technology obtained from the Haydonites. General Gunther Reinhardt, commander of the SDF-4 Izumo, is ordered to supervise this mobilization until Rick and the SDF-3 arrive. Reluctantly, Rick orders the use of the Neutron-S missiles, which will wipe out the Invid and most or all life on Earth, but only if the attack is unsuccessful. Some of his officers criticize this decision and argue that the Neutron-S missiles should be used immediately; an attack against the Invid forces on Earth, even if successful, will likely result in very heavy losses to the REF. However, Rick refuses this request, and orders that the missiles only be used as a last resort. Before the SDF-3 joins the attack, Rick asks Max Sterling to join him on the SDF-3, and appoints his daughter, Maia Sterling, to lead Skull Squadron in his place.

While on Space Station Liberty, Maia meets up with Commander Daryl Taylor, the leader of Wolf Squadron, who points out two of his new pilots: Marcus Rush and Alex Romero. As they are talking, Dana Sterling walks up to Maia, and the two sisters stare at each other for a long moment before Dana, without saying a word, walks away with a sad look on her face. The reason for the tension between the two sisters is unknown. Louie Nichols, a tech-wizard who served under Dana during the Second Robotech War, is also seen briefly.

At the end of the comic, Lisa Hayes-Hunter, now fully recovered, implies that she will resign her commission, stating that "one Admiral Hunter is enough for the fleet." She is shown dressing in robes similar to those of the Sentinel leaders, and it is implied that she has been appointed the REF's representative to their council. Lisa joins Rick on the bridge of the SDF-3 as they prepare for a test-firing of a Neutron-S missile in the Omicron Sector. However, the test goes horribly wrong, as the true power of the missiles become apparent.

The comic ends here, and paves the way for the movie Robotech: The Shadow Chronicles.

=== The Sentinels revisited ===
The rebooting of the Robotech universe relegated everything except the original 85-episode series to secondary continuity. This includes the Sentinels comics, and the Jack McKinney novels, both of which tell the same story, but diverge on many of the finer details. As part of this reboot, the Wildstorm Robotech comics before the Prelude miniseries feature a retelling of the years between the SDF-1 crash and the first animated episode, "Boobytrap." Prelude to the Shadow Chronicles picks up where the Sentinels comics left off, during the events surrounding T. R. Edwards's betrayal. With the reboot, it is still generally acknowledged that the basic events of The Sentinels still occurred, although many minor details (including the timeline) are now slightly different. Most notably, Edwards – who was the main human antagonist during The Sentinels – has been reinterpreted as a more ambiguous character. Also, notable is the appearance of Lazlo Zand, who had appeared in the Jack McKinney novels, where he had died at the end of the Robotech Masters story arc. The Prelude comic leaves Zand alive, while indirectly alluding to his apparent "death" earlier.

T.R. Edwards' fate of becoming a giant monster after falling into the Genesis Pit was an original concept from the Waltrip Brothers, not taking place in any previous Sentinels source material. They originally planned to use this idea during the run of the Robotech II: The Sentinels comic, had it not been cancelled.

=== Character fates ===
Several key Robotech characters are killed off during this comic series, some onscreen, and some are confirmed when watching the follow-up movie. They include:

- Lynn-Kyle (killed after being shot by Edwards)
- Breetai (killed when the Icarus's cannon fires on the Regent's ship)
- The Regent (killed when the Icarus's cannon fires on the Regent's ship)
- T. R. Edwards (killed by the SDF-3's Synchro-cannons)
- Exedore (killed aboard the Deukalion during the Neutron-S missile test and events in Robotech: The Shadow Chronicles)

The fate of Dr. Emil Lang was originally uncertain. It was originally believed that he may have been killed aboard the Deukalion during the Neutron-S missile test and events in Robotech: The Shadow Chronicles. Other fans assumed that he was aboard the SDF-3 during the Neutron-S missile test, not the science ship Deukalion. In the original release of the comic series, the comic book art seems vague in this aspect, as Lang is never shown in a frame with Exedore and Janice. Neither does the art indicate whether he is on the SDF-3 or the science vessel. However, the later trade paperback release reveals that the edges of the artwork had originally been trimmed for publication. The trade paperback restores the trimmed artwork showing that Lang was aboard SDF-3 at the time. Therefore, his fate, like that of the SDF-3, is currently unknown.

The Prelude comic also retcons the fate of some characters who were known to have been killed either in previous comics or the novels. Most notably, Lazlo Zand and Professor Miles Cochrane were shown to still be alive. In addition, the introduction of Maia Sterling closes the loop on "the other daughter of Max and Miriya" who Dana briefly meets during a protoculture-induced vision in Catastrophe; the McKinney novels had tied up this loose end with an entirely different character named "Aurora" (based upon the original Japanese character-designs and background from the aborted Sentinels TV series), but this character no longer exists in the Robotech storyline. There is no mention of Dana and Maia's mother Miriya.

Of the major characters who survived the Second Robotech War, only Dana Sterling and Louie Nichols are confirmed to be alive. Bowie Grant is briefly referred to in dialogue, but it is unclear if he is still alive. The other major characters who survived the Second Robotech War — including fellow 15th ATAC troopers Angelo Dante and Sean Phillips, GMP Lieutenant Nova Satori, TASC pilots Marie Crystal and Dennis Brown, and the muse-clones Musica and Allegra — are not mentioned, and their fates remain unknown.

The character of Reinhardt appeared in the Sentinels animation (as an older bearded gentleman). A Gunther Reinhardt was also established as the commander of the returning expeditionary fleet in the McKinney novelizations of the New Generation segment. He was originally mentioned (but not seen) as the overall commander of the Expeditionary force in the Masters episode Outsiders. These were all originally assumed to be the same character despite the novelization's disregarding of the different physical appearances of the Reinhardts from the Sentinels and New Generation animation. However, the Shadow Chronicles' art book would establish the older Reinhardt as "Adam" and his son "Gunther" as the General Reinhardt who commanded the returning expeditionary fleet in New Generation.

The role of the Invid turncoat scientist Tesla, whose role was pivotal in both the original comics and McKinney interpretation of the Sentinels timeline, is not discussed in the course of the Prelude comics. All of the events that would have involved Tesla in these alternate continuities occur outside of the scope of the Prelude material (either before or during the events on Tirol), so we are left with no clear explanation of what occurs between the departure of the SDF-3 from Earth and the point at which the Prelude comics begin. Significantly, there are few, if any, conflicts between the established Prelude storyline and the events depicted in the partially completed Robotech II: The Sentinels footage. While this footage has been relegated to secondary continuity, it remains likely that these pre-departure events occurred largely as they were shown.

The Karbarran Lron makes a brief appearance along with the Haydonite Veidt. Of all the Sentinel race characters, they are the only two to have any speaking lines. Representatives of Spheris, Garuda, Praxis, and Peryton are also seen in the background during a conference scene in the first installment of the miniseries. It is not known, however if these were meant to be the same named characters that have appeared in previous Sentinels stories, especially given that in the pre-retcon continuity, some of them would have been either deceased by that time or known to be elsewhere during those events.
