= List of Robotech characters =

Robotech is the American adaptation of three Japanese animated series: The Super Dimension Fortress Macross, The Super Dimension Cavalry Southern Cross, and Genesis Climber MOSPEADA, as a single TV series. The series is divided into three parts which are subtitled The Macross Saga, The Masters, and The New Generation. A fourth part was planned in a sequel series but was cancelled, with only a few episodes being produced which were later combined into a movie The Sentinels. In 2006, a new feature film was released called The Shadow Chronicles as well as a prelude comic Robotech: Prelude to the Shadow Chronicles. The story mainly follows members of the Robotech Armed Forces, a fictional military force depicted in the series. After the events of the Macross saga, the Robotech Expeditionary Force is formed which leaves Earth to hunt for the Robotech Masters. In the later part of the series they are involved in battles against the Invid. In the fictional world of Robotech, the characters are also involved in four Robotech Wars. They begin with the first battle between the SDF-1 and Zentradi (First Robotech War) and continue after the Robotech Masters try to Invade Earth (Second Robotech War). The third Robotech War is fought against the Invid, and the Fourth and final war is fought against another alien race known as the Haydonites.

== The Macross Saga characters ==
This era concerns the first two chapters of Robotech, adapted from the first Macross TV series, and related stories, otherwise known as The First Generation.

=== Rick Hunter ===
Richard "Rick" Hunter is a character in the Robotech television series. At the start of the Macross Saga, his role is that of an amateur stunt pilot – throughout his numerous appearances and mentions in primary sources, he quietly evolves into an Admiral of Earth's last fleet, as he attempts to lead the liberation of Earth from numerous alien threats. In the Macross Saga, Rick Hunter's original appearance and an adaptation of The Super Dimension Fortress Macross, Rick is based on Hikaru Ichijyo. He is voiced by Tony Oliver.

==== Original television series ====
Rick Hunter first appears in Robotech television series. The first episode begins with Rick Hunter arriving as a visitor to Macross Island to watch the launching of the Super Dimensional Fortress One and to visit his "big brother", Roy Fokker. When the Zentraedi forces attack, the SDF-1 takes the island and its inhabitants of Macross City including Rick to the orbit of Pluto on the edge of the Solar System. During this encounter, Rick rescues and falls for a young girl named Lin Minmei and the two become close. Although he is not initially open to the idea, he signs up with the Robotech Armed Forces becoming an ace fighter pilot. During his time on the SDF-1, Rick has many dealings with Lisa Hayes and the two do not get along. Rick increasingly looks toward Minmei, who has now become a popular singer and pageant winner, as a source of inspiration and happiness. After a mission to rescue Lisa, Rick is promoted and given command of his own squadron and two subordinates (Max Sterling and Ben Dixon). While on a reconnaissance mission Rick is captured along with Lisa, and Ben by the enemy Zentraedi, and interrogated by Supreme Commander Dolza, Breetai, and Exedore. While captured, Dolza grabs Lisa and orders to tell him by what process humans become human-size. Lisa refuses to respond, and Dolza tightens his grip around her. Rick yells at him to stop squeezing her and explains that humans are born at their current size when a man and woman love each other. When Breetai asks how "this love" is expressed, Rick responds that it is often done by kissing one another. Dolza orders a demonstration, and Lisa tells Rick to kiss her. The action shocks Dolza and the other Zentraedi present. They are eventually rescued shortly afterwards, and after reaching Earth during a battle Roy Fokker is killed resulting in Rick obtaining Roy's fighter spacecraft. Shortly thereafter, his second wingman Ben Dixon is killed in the line of duty which devastates Rick even more.

When his best friend Max falls in love with Miriya, and explains his plans to marry her Rick initially objects due to her being an enemy Zentraedi. Max introduces Miriya to Rick though, and after seeing her is amazed at how beautiful she is causing him to change his mind. That night while laying in bed, he thinks on how happy Max is to be married even though Miriya is an alien of a hostile race. His thoughts drift to Lisa as he tries to sort out his feelings. In the battle against the Zentraedi, Rick is devastated as he watches them fire on Earth and destroy almost all life on the planet. Rick fears for Lisa, who had been assigned to Earth and unable to leave. In the subsequent battle he picks up a distress signal from the Base where Lisa is. Rick flies into the heavily damaged base and reaches her. As the base starts collapsing, Rick flies his fighter out of the base and lands it on the planet's surface. They look and watch the SDF-1 land safely nearby, marking the end of the First Robotech War. As the survivors rebuild Earth, Rick again becomes obsessed with Minmei as he feels uncomfortable around Lisa. Meanwhile, Lisa wishes that Rick could understand that she loves him. When Lisa gives Rick photos of her for his photo album in an attempt to compete with Minmei, he is not sure how to react. After Minmei is kidnapped, Rick leads a rescue operation to save her resulting in a fight with Lisa later on. Rick lashes out at her and says to stay out of his personal life but later realizes he was wrong to behave the way he did. Rick decides to ask Lisa out for a picnic shortly afterwards, which she accepts. Minmei however, calls him to have lunch with her which he reluctantly agrees to hoping he can finish early enough to meet Lisa. After an unexpected Zentraedi attack he tries to salvage the day but Lisa learns he has been with Minmei and storms away from him in anger.

Minmei goes out in search of Rick, rekindling their love during the holidays and sharing a kiss on Christmas Eve. Lisa is devastated and initially decides to resign from the military as she feels she cannot serve beside Rick due to her feelings for him. Rick eventually begins to realize though that he cannot relate to Minmei anymore, as his experiences in combat have changed him and that Lisa understands him better than Minmei does. When Khyron attacks New Macross City and the SDF-1, Rick leaves Minmei to attend to his duty. Minmei cannot accept that Rick must constantly risk his life in battle and begs him to leave the military. Khyron eventually launches a suicide attack at the SDF-1, killing himself and everyone aboard except for Lisa, who was pushed into an ejection pod at the last moment by Admiral Henry J. Gloval. As Rick realizes that Lisa is alive, the two run into each other's arms as Minmei watches nearby. Rick realizes that his love for Minmei is based on euphoria, while his love for Lisa is greater than he had ever realized.

=== Lisa Hayes ===
Lisa Hayes, (voiced by: Melanie MacQueen under the alias of Aline Leslie) is a fictional character in the first Robotech anime television series. Lisa takes her position as First Officer with the rank of lieutenant commander aboard the SDF-1 as it prepares to launch approximately ten years after it crashed on Earth. However, the sudden arrival of the Zentraedi in Earth's orbit marks the beginning of the First Robotech War. In the initial battle, Lisa protects the SDF-1 as it fights against the Zentraedi forces. On one such occasion Lisa puts her life on the line to save the SDF-1 but is rescued by Rick Hunter whom she regards as immature. The rescue earns Rick a medal and he is promoted to Group leader, much to the initial dislike of Lisa. Lisa, along with Rick Hunter and Ben Dixon, are eventually captured by the enemy Zentraedi and interrogated by Supreme Commander Dolza, Breetai and Exedore. While captured, Lisa orders Rick to kiss her in a demonstration that shocks Dolza and the other Zentraedi present. After being rescued, Lisa shakes off the event and immediately returns to duty. Lisa cannot help the feelings she develops for Rick though, and soon becomes jealous of his obsession with Minmei. Lisa and Rick's relationship continues to mature, into an uneasy friendship.

Before the battle against Dolza's armed forces, Lisa returns to Earth to meet with her father and finds herself prohibited from returning to the SDF-1. During this time she is promoted to the rank of a full commander. Lisa is working as an operations/communications officer at an underground base when the battle begins. Although the base survives the initial bombardment, it sustains heavy damage, trapping Lisa deep inside and killing her father when he tries to defend it. While in his transformable fighter Rick heads towards Lisa after receiving her distress call. Rick flies deep into the base, and reaches Lisa. The two then fly to a safe location and watch the SDF-1 land after its victory. Following the defeat of the Zentraedi fleet, Lisa settles down in New Macross City and works toward rebuilding Earth after the devastation from the war. However, Lisa continues to struggle with the feelings she has for Rick which are not returned as Rick continues to pursue Minmei. Later Lisa is promoted to the rank of captain, along with Rick while Max, Miriya and Claudia participate in an operation to capture the last remaining Zentraedi Satellite Factory in deep space. During the mission, Lisa tries to talk to Rick about their troubled relationship, but she is interrupted. Rick and Lisa kiss on screen in front of the hostile Zentraedi (who have had no exposure to human emotions) to disorient them long enough for the rest of the plan to be executed. Rick initially refuses but Lisa forces him to kiss her, to his dismay.

When Rick rescues Minmei when she is kidnapped by Khyron, Minmei runs to Rick's arms and the two embrace. Lisa then gets into a fight with her concerning Rick. After a failed attempt at reconciling, Lisa then decides that Rick will never be with her due to his feelings for Minmei, and she gives up and deciding to resign her military career after nearly suffering a nervous breakdown from the ordeal. Lisa eventually earns the command of the Super Dimensional Fortress Two which requires her to leave Earth; before leaving Lisa stops by Rick's home to tell him of her promotion and tells him that, despite it all, she truly loves him. While she is commanding the SDF-2, it is destroyed in a suicide run along with the SDF-1 by Zentraedi renegade Khyron. Lisa is nearly killed but Rick comes to her rescue and helps her the rest of the way. At the end of the battle, Rick realizes that he could never be with Minmei and that Lisa, who shares more common interests, is the one he loves. Minmei, although sad, accepts the outcome. Rick and Lisa spend the next eight years overseeing the rebuilding of Earth.

=== Lin Minmei ===
Lin Minmei (Japanese: リン・ミンメイ Rin Minmei, Chinese: 鈴明美/林明美 Pinyin: Líng Míngměi/Lín Míngměi) (voiced by: Reba West) is a fictional anime character in the First Robotech Saga, which was adapted from the Japanese series The Super Dimension Fortress Macross. Minmei has become an iconic character of that series. Rebecca Forstadt voices Minmei under the alias "Reba West". In Robotech, Minmei is the love interest of the main character Rick Hunter and becomes an idol singer and movie star on board the spacecraft SDF-1. Her songs, which cause confusion amongst alien Zentraedi soldiers, play a critical role in the First Robotech War against Dolza's Grand fleet. At the start of the series, Minmei is staying with her Aunt Lina and Uncle Max at the restaurant on Macross Island, where the SDF-1 had crashed ten years earlier and was about to be launched. The sudden attack by the Zentraedi results in Minmei being caught in the midst of the fight, only to be rescued by Rick Hunter. Both she and Rick are swept into space along with the SDF-1, Macross City, and a large portion of Macross Island when the SDF-1 initiates an emergency teleport. While on board the ship the two become close, and they are rescued allowing her to go back to her family in the newly rebuilt Macross City. Minmei, who remains upbeat despite the circumstances, convinces her aunt and uncle to reopen their restaurant, an act which serves to inspire other refugees into returning to a sense of normalcy while on the long voyage back to Earth. Minmei also convinces Rick to join the Robotech Armed Forces, where Rick excels. The mayor of Macross City decides to enter Minmei into the Miss Macross Contest, where she becomes the unexpected winner. Minmei goes on to become a music star, with her songs becoming popular to all of Macross City. However, her newfound fame and Rick's devotion to his new role cause their relationship to slowly split apart. In addition, an attraction between Lisa Hayes and Rick slowly forms.

As the First Robotech War rages on, Rick and Minmei continue to grow farther apart. Upon the SDF-1's return to Earth, the United Earth Government denies permission for the civilians on board to be evacuated to Earth, as their knowledge of the alien threat (which has been kept secret by the military), could lead to panic among the population. However, permission is granted for Rick to take Minmei to her home town in Japan to visit her mother and father. However, her third cousin, Lin Kyle, who feels that he must protect Minmei, returns with them to the SDF-1. Rick dislikes Kyle due to his pacifism and his hatred of the military. Following their return to the SDF-1, Kyle and Minmei star in the first movie filmed in space. Kyle, who is attracted to Minmei despite the fact that she is a distant relative, attempts to kiss her, but she pushes him away. Unfortunately, Rick witnesses this and decides that any romance they once had is over. Minmei's fame continues to grow, and she sings at almost every important event on the SDF-1, including the wedding of Max Sterling and Zentraedi defector Miriya Parina, the first union of a Zentraedi and a human being. Minmei's music turns out to be a powerful weapon against the Zentraedi, who have had no exposure to human emotions or customs. Minmei becomes despondent after the Zentraedi Grand fleet blasts Earth, destroying 95% of the surface, and killing virtually all human life on the planet, including her parents. However, Minmei is able to sing "We Will Win" while the SDF-1 and the allied Zentraedi under Breetai launch an assault on Dolza's planetoid homebase. Her song incapacitate the Zentraedi commanders, throwing the fleet into chaos, allowing the SDF-1 to penetrate into the center of the base and launch its entire quantity of missiles. The base explodes and Minmei's song is the last thing Dolza hears before he is vaporized. The explosion of the base, combined with the firing of Earth's grand cannon, destroys virtually the entire Zentraedi fleet.

Following the war, Minmei resumes her singing career with Kyle as her manager. However, Minmei becomes increasingly uncomfortable with Kyle's drinking and his obsession with making money. Minmei tries to rekindle her relationship with Rick, who still has feelings for her despite his feelings for Lisa Hayes, who by now is in love with Rick and is increasingly upset about Rick's obsession with Minmei. When Minmei and Kyle are kidnapped by the rebel Zentraedi leader Khyron, Rick Hunter again comes to her rescue by leading an operation, called "Starsaver", in which he blasts his way into Khyron's fortress in his transformable fighter and rescues her and Kyle. Later, after landing his fighter at a nearby base, Minmei runs crying into Rick's arms while Kyle and Lisa Hayes look on in anger and disgust. Rick and Minmei rekindle their love, and a short time later, on Christmas Eve, they share a kiss. Kyle decides that he no longer belongs in Minmei's life and sets out on his own to an unknown destination. Lisa, who is devastated by her perceived rejection by Rick, decides to resign her military position after she concludes her feelings for Rick are too strong to allow her to serve in the military by his side.

When Khyron attacks the SDF-1 and New Macross City in his repowered warship, Minmei begs Rick not to go as she cannot understand or accept that Rick must constantly risk his life in battle. When the battle is over, both Rick and Minmei realize that they cannot be together as Rick is dedicated to the military and Minmei is dedicated to her music. Rick realizes that his love for Minmei is based more on euphoria than on reality and that his love for Lisa is stronger than he had ever realized up until now. Rick and Lisa, finally realizing and accepting their love for each other, watch Minmei walk away and vow to work together to rebuild Earth. Rick and Lisa would eventually become senior officers in the United Earth Forces while Minmei goes on to continue her career as a famous singer who is beloved by fans across the globe. on the verge of the launch of the Robotech Expeditionary Force, led by the newly completed SDF-3, Rick and Lisa are finally married with Minmei singing during their wedding. Minmei and Kyle later stow away aboard the SDF-3 and travel with it on its mission to find the Robotech Masters' homeworld.

=== Henry J. Gloval ===
Captain (later Admiral) Henry J. Gloval, (voiced by: Greg Finley) is a major character in the First Saga of Robotech. First appearing in the first episode, Gloval commands the SDF-1 throughout the First Robotech War, leading the ship through numerous battles against the Zentraedi. Gloval routinely clashes with the United Earth Government (UEG) regarding their belligerent and uncompromising attitude toward the Zentraedi and their refusal to try to make peace. Gloval finally makes a plea for peace with the Zentraedi as he speaks at the wedding of Max Sterling and Zentreadi defector Miriya Parina. A short time later, he helps facilitate a truce with Breetai and the Zentraedi under him and gains support against Zentraedi Supreme Commander Dolza. Dolza realizes though the threat that human emotions and culture now pose to his command. He orders his entire fleet into Earth's orbit to destroy the planet, the SDF-1 and all of the Zentraedi under Breetai who have rebelled. Although Gloval is unable to stop Dolza's fleet from devastating Earth, he develops and commands a successful operation. Utilizing the singing of Lin Minmei and a special attack developed by Lisa Hayes Dolza is defeated. The attack also results in the destruction of virtually the entire Zentraedi fleet.

Gloval becomes an Admiral following the defeat of Dolza's grand fleet and oversees the reconstruction of Earth. The challenges are immense: 95% of the Earth's surface has been devastated, with all major cities destroyed and most of planet's vegetation reduced to endless deserts. The population of the world is reduced from billions to only 70,000. Despite the challenges, Gloval successfully leads Earth through its recovery. New challenges later emerge including Zentraedi rebellions, a military threat posed by Khyron's rebels, and the capture of the Zentraedi factory satellite. Gloval provides leadership deciding to appoint Captain Lisa Hayes to command the newly built SDF-2. In the final battle against the rebel Zentraedi under Khyron, Gloval leads the bridge crew of the SDF-1 into battle despite the massive damage the ship sustained during the war. Using all of the SDF-1's remaining power, it is able to fire one shot which cripples Khyron's warship. Khyron is determined though to have his revenge against Gloval and rigs his warship for a suicide run at the SDF-1. Gloval's final act before he is killed by the impact is to push Lisa Hayes into the last functioning escape pod on the bridge. Gloval becomes a celebrated hero, and he and his crew are held as examples for new military recruits to follow.

=== Max Sterling ===
Maximillian "Max" Sterling (voiced by Cam Clarke) is one of the fictional characters in the Robotech anime television series. He is a young fighter pilot assigned to Rick Hunter's various commands (Black Group, Vermilion Team, and Skull Squadron) along with Ben Dixon. He is 19 years old at the beginning of the Robotech's "Macross Saga". Max having nine confirmed kills in his first combat encounter earns the attention of Roy Fokker, the SDF-1's air group commander. Roy then assigned both Max and Ben under the command of Rick Hunter. Rick then sent him on a reconnaissance mission to scout Zentraedi targets. Max and Rick become friends and later serve together with the Robotech Expeditionary Force. His fighting style gains the attention of Zentraedi Miriya Parina, who fights him in a furious battle that finds its way into the streets of Macross City. Unknown to Max, his defeat of the Zentraedi force's finest pilot made him marked for death by Miriya, who becomes obsessed with finding him. After several more near encounters, Max and Miriya finally confront each other in a video game clash at an arcade. Max again defeats Miriya which has her conclude that Max is the pilot who had bested her in real combat. As Miriya storms off in anger, Max asks her to go out with him on a date which she accepts. She secretly plots to kill him though when they meet.

Max arrives at the park where he eagerly awaits Miriya's arrival. Miriya then attacks him, but despite the surprise he is able to dodge her first attack. Miriya reveals that she is a (micronized to human stature) Zentraedi warrior and that her mission is to take revenge against him. She then attacks Max again, but he is eventually able to point a knife at her face while holding her down. Beaten for a third time, she falls to her knees while crying asking him to kill her as she believes she cannot live with the shame of being defeated. Max however, says that he could never harm her because she is "so beautiful". Miriya realizes that the feelings that Max has awoken within her are not of hate but of love and the two passionately kiss. Max asks Miriya to marry him to which she accepts though not knowing what marriage is. Later, Max meets with Rick Hunter to explain what occurred, and his plans to marry Miriya. Rick initially objects to Max's plans to marry her asking what a human and a Zentraedi could possibly have in common. After Max introduces her though he is amazed at how beautiful she is and he suddenly changes his mind. Captain Henry J. Gloval speaks at the wedding to congratulate the two lovers and to call for peace between the two races. The Zentraedi observe the wedding by way of intercepted television signals. Many watch with curiosity and become more attracted to the human way of life questioning their current austere lives as warriors.

As the first marriage between a human and a Zentraedi, the union of Max and Miriya becomes a symbol of peace and understanding during the First Robotech War. The wedding is interrupted by a Zentraedi attack as Breetai is ordered by Dolza to send his entire fleet to destroy the SDF-1. While fighting Miriya shows Max how to disable Zentraedi power armor without killing the pilots, a tactic which is then utilized by the SDF-1's forces. This development, combined with their increased exposure to human emotions and culture through watching the wedding causes a wave of mutinies to spread through the Zentraedi fleet, forcing Breetai to call a truce. Afterwards, Miriya becomes Max's wingmate on duty, piloting a red fighter alongside Max's blue one. In the final battle against Dolza's Grand Fleet, the two fight side by side in their transformable fighters. After the Zentraedi Fleet that nearly destroys the earth is vanquished, Max and Miriya settle down in New Macross City and begin a new life together. Miriya gives birth to a daughter and names her Dana, the first child born from a Human/Zentraedi union. Max and Miriya's happy marriage and their baby daughter become the envy of Lisa Hayes and Claudia Grant. Both look forward to raising their daughter in a peaceful world, but the start of the Zentraedi rebellions and the reemergence of Khyron and Azonia forces Max and Miriya to resume their military roles as fighter pilots. Max and Miriya take part in the mission into deep space to capture the last remaining Zentraedi Factory Satellite. Admiral Henry J. Gloval asks them to bring Dana (who is only eight months old) along. The Zentraedi, who have had no exposure to human culture and have never seen a baby before flee when they see it. This throws the command ship's crew into chaos which causes disorder throughout the enemy fleet, allowing the United Earth Forces to seize the factory.

Max and Miriya later join in an attempt to stop Khyron as he steals a protoculture matrix from New Macross City. However, after Khyron detonates bombs hidden throughout the city, they are forced to turn back to help rescue civilians from the resulting fires. Max and Miriya fight alongside Rick Hunter again in the final battle against Khyron and rebel Zentraedi. However, despite their efforts, Khyron is still able to steer his warship in a suicide run against the SDF-1, destroying it and rendering New Macross City uninhabitable. Like Rick, Max and Miriya are devastated by the loss of their friends, but both continue to serve as pilots during the remaining Zentraedi rebellions. When they arrive in Earth's orbit. Max and Miriya later join their friends Rick and Lisa Hayes-Hunter aboard the SDF-3 as part of the Robotech Expeditionary Force (REF). Although difficult, they leave Dana on Earth with her godfather, General Rolf Emerson and his wife Laura. Dana, the only child of a human/Zentraedi union, was deemed by Professor Lazlo Zand to be too scientifically valuable to risk going with the REF. Events keep the SDF-3 away from Earth for the rest of Dana's childhood. Dana eventually graduates from the Robotech Military Academy, following in the footsteps of her parents. During the mission, Max assumes Rick's former role as commander of the Skull Squadron. The REF expedition, which fails to return to Earth against the Robotech Masters, gets caught in a war with the Invid on a number of planets, as chronicled in Robotech II: The Sentinels.

=== Miriya Parina ===
Miriya Parina Sterling (voiced by: Edie Mirman in the TV series, and by Catherine Battistone in Robotech II: The Sentinels), is one of the fictional characters in the anime television series Robotech. She is a combat pilot that serves in the Zentraedi forces. Miriya is a female warlord and is considered the greatest warrior of all the Zentraedi. She is a fearsome warrior who pilots the Zentraedi Power Armor and she considered herself to be unbeatable in combat. When the Zentraedi attack the SDF-1, Miriya leads several raids against the human forces, including one in which ace pilot Roy Fokker is killed. Miriya enjoys combat and takes great pride in the fact that she has never once failed to defeat a foe in combat. She takes upon a challenge from Khyron, who says that there is a human ace pilot aboard the SDF-1 that even she could not best. Intrigued, Miriya takes it upon herself to engage him in combat, but finds herself frustrated as she cannot defeat him, a situation which she had never faced before, nor did she think was possible. Determined to maintain her reputation, Miriya decides to be shrunk down to human form so she can infiltrate the SDF-1 and kill him. After infiltrating the SDF-1, Miriya explores Macross City and marvels at human culture. At a video game arcade (which Miriya believes is a combat training facility), she is challenged to a duel by Max Sterling, whom Miriya had dueled against in real combat. Max defeats her, and Miriya correctly concludes that Max is the ace pilot whom she faced in real combat. Miriya is furious that she has been beaten again but as she storms off, Max asks her out on a date. Miriya accepts, although she secretly plots to kill him.

When Max arrives, Miriya launches a surprise attack. She reveals that she is a Zentraedi warrior, and that her mission is revenge against him. Max gains the upper hand in the attack and ends up pinning her down. Beaten for a third time, Miriya becomes emotionally despondent, and her anger and hatred give way to sadness. She asks Max to kill her as she believes she cannot live with the shame of being defeated. Max however, says that he could never harm her because she is so beautiful. Max and Miriya look into each other's eyes and Miriya realizes that the feelings she holds toward Max are not of hate but of love. Max wipes a tear from Miriya's cheek and, although he admits it sounds crazy, asks her to marry him. Miriya, with no idea what marriage is, accepts his proposal. Wedding preparations soon begin, and the two are married in a historic wedding aboard the SDF-1. Max and Miriya are the first union of a human and a Zentraedi, which becomes an unlikely symbol of peace between the two races as their wedding raises hopes throughout the SDF-1 that peace with the Zentraedi is possible. The wedding proves to be such a significant event that the Zentraedi also observe the wedding. When the Zentraedi attack after the wedding ceremony the two race off to battle. By now though, many of the Zentraedi involved are having second thoughts after seeing the wedding on television. The Zentraedi's increased exposure to human emotions and the realization that the human way of life may just be more enjoyable causes a wave of mutinies to spread through the Zentraedi fleet as soldiers refuse to fight and turn against their superiors. The Zentraedi forces as a result are forced to call a truce with the SDF-1. After the battle, Miriya initially has trouble adapting to life among humans and a culture that she never knew existed only a short time earlier. Miriya sticks by Max's side through the rest of the war. She proves herself an extremely skilled pilot and becomes Max's wingmate. In the final battle against Dolza's armada, Max and Miriya, begin fighting side by side. Both survive the battle which ends the First Robotech War.

After the war, Max and Miriya settle down in New Macross City, and begin a new life together. Miriya gives birth to a daughter, Dana Sterling, the first child born from a Human/Zentraedi union. Max and Miriya happily embrace their new role as parents. When Zentraedi rebellions begin to break out though, and Khyron and Azonia reemerge after two years in hiding, both are forced back into combat. Max and Miriya take part in an important mission into deep space to capture the last remaining Zentraedi Factory Satellite. Admiral Henry J. Gloval asks them to bring Dana who is only eight months old along to serve as a diversion. When inside, Miriya proudly displays baby Dana to the hostile Zentraedi on board. The Zentraedi become filled with terror as they conclude Dana is a mutation who is contagious and flee in fear. The resulting chaos aboard the enemy command ship causes disorder throughout the enemy fleet, allowing the Robotech Armed Forces and their Zentraedi allies to launch an attack that cripples the enemy. Max and Miriya later join their friends in another battle. During the battle Khyron launches a suicide run that destroys the SDF-1. Many of their friends die as a result, but Max and Miriya vow to continue to work to rebuild Earth and to take humanity to the stars. When Dana turns 10, Max and Miriya reluctantly leave her behind with Major Rolf Emerson who is a close family friend. Max and Miriya have to go on a mission with the Robotech Expeditionary Force to find the Robotech Masters' homeworld. Dana, as the only child of a human/Zentraedi union had been judged by Dr. Lazlo Zand as being too valuable to risk going with her parents. Max and Miriya hoped that the mission would be over quickly, but events would keep them away from Earth for the rest of Dana's childhood. The mission would last 22 years, during which time Max and Miriya have a second daughter who they name Maia Sterling.

=== Claudia Grant ===
Claudia Grant, (voiced by: Iona Morris) is a fictional character from Robotech. Claudia becomes a bridge officer on the SDF-1 with the rank of lieutenant commander. She was third in command when the SDF-1 was first launched, just as the arrival of Zentraedi forces in Earth's solar system marked the start of the First Robotech War. As the SDF-1's Chief Communications Officer, Claudia is tasked with coordinating communications for the 15,000 crew members aboard the battle fortress. Despite challenges, she keeps ship operations running smoothly throughout the First Robotech War. Claudia maintains a relaxed and confident manner which enables her to develop strong friendships with the bridge officers, who regard her as a big sister. She also develops a strong relationship with Captain Gloval, whom she regards as a father-figure. Claudia and Lisa, despite their different attitudes, also become good friends. In her early military career, Claudia courted fighter pilot Roy Fokker, during her first assignment. After both are posted to the SDF-1, they fall in love and became a couple. Claudia is devastated when Roy is killed during the First Robotech War, but is able to get over her grief.

After the war, Claudia, who by then had been made a full commander, settles down in New Macross City and attempts to move on with her life. She works to rebuild Earth following the devastation caused by the war. She continues to serve in a number of operations, including the capture of the last Zentraedi satellite factory. Claudia does her best to comfort Lisa in regards to her feelings for Rick Hunter, who continues to be obsessed with Lin Minmei. Lisa, who is in love with Rick and wishes she could make him understand how she feels, is consoled by Claudia. Claudia offers her advice and bluntly tells Lisa not to let Rick "get away from her". Claudia later becomes good friends with Max Sterling and Miriya Parina Sterling but envies both their marriage and their baby daughter Dana Sterling. Claudia is killed during the final battle against Khyron when he launches a suicide run against the SDF-1. Claudia and her bravery are later held as examples for others to follow. In Robotech II: The Sentinels, during the wedding of Rick Hunter and Lisa Hayes, Claudia can be seen briefly smiling from beyond the grave.

=== Breetai ===
Breetai, (voiced by Tony Clay) is the fleet commander of an armada of the Imperial Zentraedi Forces sent to recover the lost SDF-1 during the First Robotech War. Breetai is a fierce warrior whose face is half-covered by cybernetic faceplate. Breetai's fleet becomes enthralled by human culture, and to prevent widespread cultural contamination, Supreme Commander Dolza orders Breetai and his fleet destroyed. In response, Breetai and his advisor Exedore forms an alliance with Earth. He ultimately renounces his Zentraedi heritage and joins the Robotech Defense Force.

=== Khyron ===
Khyron, (voiced by Gregory Snegoff) is the unconventional leader of the Zentraedi Botoru Battalion. He is known as Quamzin Kravshera in The Super Dimension Fortress Macross, the series which was adapted into the first saga of Robotech.

Sometimes known as Khyron Kravshera or Lord Khyron, is a commander during the First Robotech War. Khyron earned the nickname Khyron the Backstabber because of his habit of attacking his own men when angered or drunk. Khyron's Botoru Battalion is summoned to the Solar System by Commander Breetai, against the advice of Exedore, to assist in the capture of the SDF-1 Macross. While his tactics kept the Robotech Armed Forces off balance, he was often rebuked by both Commanders Breetai and Azonia for risking undue damage to the fortress. Following the destruction of the Zentraedi Grand fleet, Khyron's ship crashes in the arctic where he remains dormant for almost two years. However, Khyron and Azonia steal a protoculture chamber from New Detroit which they use to resize the growing number of disaffected micronized Zentraedi back into warrior giants. Although many Zentraedi had been peacefully assimilated into Earth's surviving human population, many others were simply unable to overcome their natural desire to fight and destroy and they turn to Khyron as their leader. In an effort to get their hands on a piece of equipment to repower their warship, Khyron and Azonia kidnap Lin Minmei and her cousin Lin Kyle and attempt to ransom them for the SDF-1. The plan however is foiled when a rescue operation led by Rick Hunter, dubbed Operation Star Saver, is able to free both Minmei and Kyle.

Khyron's forces continue to grow in size as more and more disaffected Zentraedi join him and other Zentraedi rebellions start breaking out all over the world, straining the United Earth Government's forces. Khyron restyles himself as Khyron the Destroyer and takes advantage of these circumstances by launching an assault on Macross City managing to steal a protoculture storage matrix. As his forces escape with the matrix, Khyron detonates numerous bombs hidden within the city causing massive damage and inflicting numerous civilian casualties which soon stream into overflowing hospitals. Khryon uses the protoculture matrix to repower his warship, but he decides that he cannot leave earth until the SDF-1 is destroyed. Khryon and his forces later launch a full-scale assault on Macross City. Firing his warship's main gun, a swath of New Macross City is obliterated, and the SDF-1 takes a direct hit. Khyron also fires numerous missiles at the city, causing even more damage than his attack a month earlier. However, Admiral Henry J. Gloval and the bridge crew manage to regain control of the SDF-1 and launch it a short distance into the air. Using all of its remaining power, the SDF-1's main gun is able to fire one shot which cripples Khryon's warship. The SDF-1's final shot shears off an entire section of Khyron's ship, crippling its weapons, defenses and communications. Bleeding from a severe cut above his eye, Khyron sees that his top lieutenants, Grel and Gerao, have been killed but that Azonia is still alive. Despite the now critical situation, Khyron is still obsessively determined to destroy the SDF-1 at the cost of his own life.

Khyron, after realizing that his warship's navigation system is still operational, tells Azonia that they can still destroy the SDF-1, but it requires a sacrifice. Khyron then rigs his warship's navigation system for a collision course with the SDF-1. The SDF-1, drained of power, cannot defend itself as Khryon launches his suicidal run. All available mecha and veritech fighters throw everything they have against Khyron's ship, but they cannot stop it. The collision and resulting impact and explosion destroys Khyron's ship, the SDF-1 and the newly completed SDF-2. There are no survivors of those aboard the SDF-1 except for Commander Lisa Hayes, who was pushed into the only remaining operable escape pod on the bridge at the last moment. The rest of the bridge crew, including Admiral Henry J. Gloval, Commander Claudia Grant, and bridge operators Vannesa Leeds, Sammy Porter and Kim Young, die at their posts. Khyron is held as a hero among the remaining rebel Zentraedi and their uprisings continue before the last rebels are defeated.

=== Dolza ===
Dolza, (voiced by Michael Reynolds) is the Supreme Commander of all Zentraedi forces. He is the second oldest Zentraedi (only Exedore is older) and is the largest of his race, standing 17.5 meters (57.4 feet) tall, although in the Jack McKinney Robotech novels, Dolza is described as being over 24.4 meters (80 feet) tall. Dolza is ordered by the Robotech Masters to find and recover the lost spaceship that had crashed on Earth. The ship, stolen by the disciples of Zor, contains a vital component, a protoculture matrix, which the Masters desperately need to ensure the survival of their civilization. Although Dolza and his Grand Fleet are eventually defeated, the cost to Earth and human race is astronomical reducing the population from billions to only 70,000. Approximately 95% of the Earth's surface is "devastated" in the "Zentraedi Rain of Death."

=== Exedore ===
Exedore (voiced by: Ted Layman) is a fictional character who appears in the first generation Robotech series. Exedore is a Zentraedi who serves as adviser to Fleet Commander Breetai during their search for the SDF-1. Because of the constant battles with the Earth humans, numerous Zentraedi become enthralled by the culture of the Micronians involved and their lifestyle. To avoid widespread cultural contamination, Supreme Zentraedi commander Dolza orders the extermination of Breetai and Azonia's fleets. Anticipating this, Exedore travels to SDF-1 as an emissary and proposes an alliance with Earth. His proposal is well received and Breetai and Azonia's fleets offer well needed assistance in Earth's defense against Dolza's armada. Exedore later serves as an advisor to the Robotech Defense Force in the reconstruction years following the successful defeat of Dolza's armada.

=== Roy Fokker ===
Roy Fokker, (voiced by: Dan Woren) is a fictional character is the first series of Robotech. He is Rick Hunter's surrogate father figure and mentor. Roy is a well-reputed ace fighter pilot and leader of the Vermilion team's Skull Squadron. According to Robotech Art 1, Rick was a member of Roy's aerobatic team prior to Roy's joining the Robotech Defense Force (RDF).

=== Ben Dixon ===
Ben Dixon is a character based on Hayao Kakizaki of the original Japanese series, The Super Dimension Fortress Macross. Ben, along with his best friend Max Sterling, become rookie wingmates under the command of newly promoted Lieutenant Rick Hunter, forming the Vermilion Squadron with Roy Fokker. He and Roy are fellow jokesters and often team up to tease Rick over the love triangle he's involved in with Lin Minmei and Lisa Hayes. Ben is killed when a malfunction of the SDF-1's defenses causes them to explode. Following the recent loss of Roy Fokker, Ben's death comes as another painful blow to Rick, Max, and Lisa.

=== Macross operators ===
The Macross operators, also known by fans as the Bridge Bunnies, – Vanessa Leeds, Kim Young, and Sammie Porter were three minor fictional characters in the first saga of Robotech. They were attractive girls who managed the various functions of the SDF-1 Macross's bridge under Captain Gloval. In episode 36 (To the Stars) the three died at their posts defending Macross City from Khyron's suicide attack.

=== Donald Hayes ===
Admiral Donald Hayes (adapted from Takashi Hayase of the Macross series) is the father of Lisa Hayes. In Episode 15 of the series, he tells Captain Henry J. Gloval to leave the Earth with the SDF-1 Macross and not to allow the civilians on board to disembark. He also convinced that the Grand Cannon will be able to wipe out a Zentradi invasion force despite clear warnings of how powerful the enemy is. The character shares the same fate in both Robotech and Macross. During Dolza's attack on the SDF-1 Macross and the Earth, the Admiral uses the Grand Cannon but only manages to destroy 800,000 of the invasion forces' 4.8 million capital ships. The cannon is hit by enemy fire, and he eventually dies in the ensuing explosion. His daughter Lisa Hayes is saved by Rick Hunter.

== The Masters characters ==
This era concerns the second series adapted to Robotech (Southern Cross) and the movie adapted from Megazone 23, and is referred to as The Masters story arc.

=== Dana Sterling ===
Dana Sterling (Voiced by: Melissa Newman in the Robotech TV series, and Deanna Morris in Robotech II: The Sentinels) is a fictional character from the Robotech anime television series. Dana is the daughter of Max Sterling and Miriya Parina Sterling, heroes of the First Robotech War, and the sister of Maia Sterling. The character was adapted from the originally unrelated Komilia Maria Fallyna Jenius in The Super Dimension Fortress Macross and Jeanne Francaix in Super Dimension Cavalry Southern Cross. This change was possible because the former was an infant while the later was a teen who had lost their parents.

Dana's mother, Miriya, is a former Zentraedi warrior who, after being micronized in order to infiltrate the SDF-1 and kill Max, who fell in love with her, the two were quickly married. Dana was born in New Macross City in the aftermath of the First Robotech War which saw most of the Earth's surface reduced to ashes. Dana is the first child born from a Human/Zentraedi union and is considered, like her parents' marriage, a symbol of, and a hope for, peace between the two races. At only age 18, Dana would follow in her parents' footsteps and take leading role in the defense of Earth from alien forces that seek its destruction. During the Invid Invasion, Dana and her team held off the enemy for as long as they could, but they were eventually forced to retreat and regroup with the rest of the REF.

=== Rolf Emerson ===
Rolf Emerson (Voiced by: Michael McConnohie) is a fictional character in the second series of Robotech where he plays the role of a General and a godparent. Emerson, and his wife Laura, were made godparents to Bowie Grant and Dana Sterling who were left under his care while their parents joined the Robotech Expeditionary Force. Emerson's decision to enroll both of them in the military later results in a divorce from Laura. Dana and Bowie both graduate from the United Earth Forces Military academy and are placed with the 15th tactical armored squadron. Bowie falls in love with an alien named Musica, when he tries to smuggle her to Earth though the plan is discovered. He escapes, becoming a fugitive for the latter part of the series. Emerson later strongly opposes Supreme Commander Anatole Leonard's treatment of captured bioroid pilots, and openly disagrees with him. As a result of his refusal to negotiate with the Robotech Masters Leonard assigns him to a place where he feels he will be more useful. This was the first line of defense against the Robotech Masters. Against the odds he survives a major battle with the Masters by carrying out a teleport. Emerson eventually meets the Robotech Masters themselves after he and his crew are captured in space. Failing to persuade the Robotech Masters to consider peace, he dies protecting Bowie from a rifle blast. Emerson's death is a blow for Dana and Bowie, who had regarded him as their father and friend.

=== Bowie Grant ===
Bowie Grant is the son of Vince Grant and Jean Grant and nephew of the late Claudia Grant. As with Dana, his parents left him in the custody of his god-father while they joined the forces of the SDF-3. Bowie and Dana become close childhood friends, and are like brother and sister to each other. When Dana enters the service, Bowie tags along and eventually became her aid in the squadron she is placed in. While Bowie is a skilled fighter, he has no love for war or physical sports. Bowie's true interest is in music where he is gifted in piano playing. He eventually finds himself attracted to an alien named Musica. A mutual attraction then forms that causes both Bowie and Musica to desert their posts in an attempt to avoid the insanity of war.

=== Nova Satori ===
Nova Satori (Voiced by: Edie Mirman) was adapted from Lana Isavia in The Super Dimension Cavalry Southern Cross. At 19 years old, Nova is the youngest and highest ranking female military police officer in the Global Military Police (GMP). Nova first appears in Episode 37 – "Dana's Story". Due to the feudal society that had evolved in the 15 years following the First Robotech War, the GMP constituted the only worldwide law-enforcement organization. Nova was forced to say farewell to all her outside friendships due to the rigid doctrines that the GMP required. Initially, Nova repeatedly tries to root out possible traitors and spies from within Earth's military. Her interrogations though of people she suspects cause her to lose focus while reviewing several personnel files. As a result, in one such case they negatively impact the record of a pilot named Dennis Brown. When she apologizes, he thanks her for helping him stay on Earth to keep an eye on an overzealous military leadership and the two later become romantically involved. Nova's military training eventually conflicts with her sense of justice, and she is forced to choose between her duty or her friendships. Realizing that the war has become one of survival and freedom from an overwhelmingly powerful enemy, Nova chooses her friends in their mission to stop the Robotech Masters.

=== Robotech Masters ===
The Robotech Masters are a species of humanoids who mostly appear as triumvirates, native to Tirol, a moon of the planet Fantoma. According to the Jack McKinney novelizations, a Tirolian scientist named Zor discovered the Invid homeworld, and the mysterious Flower of Life. This discovery leads to the development of Protoculture, a source of tremendous power and unique qualities. Their imperial machinations lead them to turn their cloned Zentraedi miners into a formidable military force. The Zentradi proceed to steal the Flower of Life from the Invid, and conquer the Local Group of star systems.

== The New Generation characters ==
The anime series Genesis Climber Mospeada was adapted and dubbed into Robotech as the third installment called Robotech: The New Generation.

=== Scott Bernard ===
Scott Bernard is the leader of the group of freedom fighters in The New Generation. He was born in outer space less than a year after the Robotech Expeditionary Force left Earth to find the Robotech Masters Homeworld in hopes of preventing another war on Earth. One of the first children born during the mission, he was part of the new generation of Earth's defenders. Later on in his life, he proposes to Marlene Rush, his then girlfriend who accepts. Scott was set to marry her, but she is killed in a battle with the Invid that devastates him. Scott received a holographic medallion she gave as a token of her love before her death though, and he uses it to give him strength in future battles. Scott vows to do all he can to help weaken the Invid on Earth, and he is joined on his mission by other freedom fighters as the series progresses.

Along the way, the group encounters a woman named Ariel who apparently has amnesia. They decide to call her Marlene after Scott's fiancé. As she travels with them, Scott and Ariel fall in love with each other until Scott discovers that she is an Invid, at which point his feelings start to get mixed. In the end, Scott realizes that he is in love with Ariel but during the battle can not bring himself to admit it. During the final battle, Scott helps lead Earth resistance forces and Robotech Expeditionary Force commandos against the Invid forces. Ariel meanwhile manages to convince her mother, the Invid Regis to leave Earth lest both races be destroyed. Ariel chooses to stay behind and Scott meets her after the battle. He then tells Ariel that he must leave Earth to rejoin the Robotech Expeditionary Force to search for Admiral Rick Hunter and the SDF-3, which is lost in space. Scott promises Ariel though that he will return. Scott Bernard is also known as Stieg Barnard in Genesis Climber Mospeada

=== Ariel ===
Ariel (voiced by Melanie MacQueen in The Next Generation and by Kari Wahlgren in The Shadow Chronicles) is the first of the Invid that transmutates into human form. In the original anime Genesis Climber Mospeada, her character was known as Aisha. In The Next Generation, she is sent to spy on Scott Bernard's group of freedom fighters, but appears to suffer amnesia when she is recovered by Scott's resistance group. Due to the transmutation into human form, her mindset is that of a newly born human. Ariel is initially frightened as she now has the free will to live independently from the Invid. The group takes her in their company and Scott names her Marlene, after his fiancé who was killed by the Invid. Marlene becomes an integral part of the group as they fight the Invid as she can sense when they are near. She later develops feelings towards Scott and they both fall in love with each other. On one encounter with the Invid though both of them to discover that Marlene is one of them. Marlene/Ariel had believed she was a human suffering from amnesia. Scott questions his feelings for her throughout the final two episodes of the series until he realizes that he is truly in love with her regardless of the fact that she is an Invid.

When the Robotech Expeditionary Force launches a full-scale offensive against the Invid on Earth, the battle slowly turns against them. The Robotech Expeditionary Force decide they have no option but to use the Neutron-S missiles, which will destroy the Invid but also have an unknown impact on Earth. As the missiles are launched and travel towards Earth, Marlene confronts her mother Invid Regis, and tries to convince her that what the Invid are doing is as wrong as what the Robotech Masters did to them. Together with her sister Sera, she convinces the Regis to leave Earth. The Regis grants Ariel's request to stay behind, and destroys the Neutron-S missiles before they reach Earth. Marlene stays on Earth, along with Sera because she feels more human than Invid while Scott leaves her behind in search for the SDF-3. In Robotech: The Shadow Chronicles she receives a vision from the Regis concerning the Haydonites: that they will betray the Robotech Expeditionary Force as they are no longer useful to them. This prompts her to leave Earth and go to Scott's side with her teleporting abilities, with the intention of helping him and the Icarus crew fight the Haydonites in any way she can.

=== Corg ===
Corg is one of four known Invids created in human form by the Invid Regess. As the Crown Prince of the Invid Race, he and his sister Sera were both given special fighter spacecraft to fly in battle. With Sera, he pursues Scott Bernard's freedom fighters in many battles. Being now in a human form he is also exposed to human emotions. While his two Invid Sisters Ariel and Sera feel love and compassion, he is filled with anger and hatred. Despite failing to defeat Scott Bernard's band of rebels, he participates in a major battle with the Robotech Expeditionary Force where he kills many human pilots. His hate ends up getting the better of him though, and he is eventually killed in battle by Bernard. Corg's counterpart in Genesis Climber Mospeada was named Batra.

=== Rook Bartley ===
Rook Bartley (Voiced by: Susie London) appears in the New Generation storyline. She first appears in Episode 62 – "The Lost City". As a young teenager, Rook was a member of the Blue Angels biker gang along with her boyfriend, Romy, and other juveniles. When Romy decided to break up the Blue Angels because of pressure from a rival gang, the Red Snakes, Rook tried to take on the Snakes alone but was beaten and left for dead. Rook runs away from home as a result later joining a band of freedom fighters led by Scott Bernard. Over the course of the series she begins to develop feelings for Rand, but initially denies it. Toward the end of the series, she admits her feelings to herself, and to Rand, and the two become a couple.

=== Lancer ===
Lance Belmont (Voiced by: Jimmy Flinders) (also known as Yellow Belmont in Genesis Climber Mospeada) appears in the third chapter of the Robotech series. He joined the fight with Scott Bernard and his group to battle the Invid. Lance first appears in Episode 63 – "Lonely Soldier Boy" where he is a part of the first attack wing that attempts to liberate the Earth from the Invid. He flies a non-transformable spacecraft but crash lands during the attack, the rest of the division is destroyed by the Invid forces. He is rescued by a young woman named Carla who disguises him as a woman in order to save him from the townspeople who were assisting the Invid. Lancer takes the name Yellow Dancer and passes himself off as a female singer, a role he originally created to avoid capture by the Invid. Scott Bernard, Rand and Annie later arrive in the small town that "Yellow Dancer" is performing at, and Lancer reveals his real identity as a military trained special operative. Lance and Sera, Princess of the Invid later fall in love with each other. The relationship eventually leads Sera to abandon the genocidal tactics of her brother Corg and break with the Regis. After the end of the Third Robotech war, he continues to do concerts as Lancer. He is then reunited with Rook, Rand, Annie, Lunk, Marlene and Scott, who are all off to join the expedition to find Rick Hunter. Afterwards he returns to a small cottage where he is welcomed by Sera, who is expecting a baby.

=== Sera ===
Sera was one of four Invid Simulagents created in humanoid form by the Invid Regess. As the Crown Princess of the Invid Race, she and her brother Corg, shared command of Invid Legions, and they were both given Invid Commander mecha to fly in battle. With Corg, she fought Lieutenant Scott Bernard's freedom fighters. Being now in a humanoid form, she was also exposed to human emotions. Like her sister Ariel, she fell in love with one of the human resistance fighters named Lancer (aka Lance Belmont). Together, they convinced the Invid Regess that further war would bring the destruction of both races, ultimately siding with the humans. As a result, when the Invid Regess and the rest of the Invid left the earth both Sera and Ariel were left behind.

=== Rand ===
Rand is a young freedom fighter from southern Argentina, and a self-taught survivor. He has managed to live off the land on his own and still avoid capture and slavery by the Invid. When he joins Scott Bernard he begins a voyage of self-discovery, and becomes young Annie's protector. An orphan of the invasion himself, he understands Annie's situation from firsthand experience. Under Scott Bernard's guidance, Rand becomes an excellent combat soldier. When he falls in love with Rook Bartley, his commitment to her is total. Rand's counterpart in Genesis Climber Mospeada was named Ray.

=== Lunk ===
Jim Austin, also known as Lunk, is a biomaintenance engineer that returned from the expeditionary forces to fight off the Robotech Masters. While supporting a ground unit, he arrives in time to see his best friend being hotly pursued by Invid. Jim loses his nerve and flees the scene leaving his friend to certain death. Jim is ashamed of his desertion and hides his past and assumes the nickname of Lunk. When a local gang of bikers find out about his past, they begin terrorizing him and his friends. While chasing Lunk and a friend one day they cause him to crash, Lunk escapes but his friend is not so lucky. While Lunk is about to run away again, Scott and Rook are ready and willing to go after the gang and rescue his friend. This reawakens Lunk's sense of duty, and he leads Scott to an old Alpha fighter he had been maintaining. Lunk later attempts to complete his best friend's last request of returning a book to his father. When they reach the village where his friend's father lived, they find that the locals killed him when he tried to teach them that they could not fight the invid. As the series progresses Lunk slowly regains his self-esteem while he helps the group out and maintains their fighting mecha in optimal combat condition. Lunk's counterpart in Genesis Climber Mospeada was named Jim Warston.

=== Annie LaBelle ===
Annie LaBelle, (voiced by Mary Cobb) who goes by the nickname "Mint", is a petite teenage girl from Panama. She is described as a "free-spirited, talkative orphan looking to live life to its fullest" and "obsessed with finding herself a boyfriend". Her counterpart in Mospaeda is named Mint la Blue.

=== The Invid ===
The Invid are a fictional alien race in the Robotech storyline. They appear in the New Generation portion of the series. Invid are invertebrate, bipedal, crab-like creatures that came from a now uninhabitable planet. Their world was defoliated by the Robotech Masters in an attempt to monopolize the Flower of Life, a powerful narcotic that was native to the planet and also the source of an incredibly powerful energy source. Enraged by the devastation and betrayal by those who came as apparent friends, the sedate and agrarian Invid militarized and began a program of genetic manipulation, evolving to a point where they could strike back. The unleashed rage of the Invid proved superior to the Masters' own power, and the Robotech empire was slowly conquered. Ultimately, the Invid traced the stolen Flowers to Earth and they invaded, beginning the Third Robotech War.

The Invid are led by twin monarchs. Long ago, the Regis genetically modified herself to interact more easily with the scientist Zor, who came to their planet to study the Flowers of Life. In this form, she was seduced by Zor, who took from her knowledge of the Flowers' secret before abandoning her and the Invid. The Regis is devoted to the Flower of Life and its ability to transform. While willing to engage in near-merciless conflict in the short term, she views evolution as a path to move beyond slaughter in the longer term and aspires to reach a stage of evolution where the Invid might recapture the idyllic life that was once theirs. The male counterpart to the Regis is known as the Regent. Less interested in evolution than his estranged wife, the Regent is also physically undeveloped beyond the natural bipedal stage of existence that was the Invid's original form. His path is not transformation but annihilation and links the personal betrayal of the Regis' seduction to the defoliation. He has since that time devoted himself to the destruction of the Masters' race.

== The Sentinels characters ==
This era starts by overlapping a portion of The Lost Generation. It continues parallel to The Second Generation, and interacts with the main storyline in The Third Generation by providing the forces of liberation. This era ends with the start of The Shadow Chronicles era.

=== Jonathan Wolfe ===
Colonel Jonathan Wolfe (Voiced by: Tom Wyner) is the Leader of a squadron dubbed The Wolf Pack, they were successful in annihilating many of the enemies encountered by Admiral Hunter's Robotech Defenders. When the Wolfe Pack is sent to Earth to do battle with the Robotech Masters, they survive the Invid attack. The Wolf Pack keeps the hope alive until Admiral Hunter returns.

=== T. R. Edwards ===
T. R. Edwards (Voiced By: Michael McConnohie) is a character in the Robotech Sentinels series. Edwards' activities during the First Robotech War, are mostly unchronicled. The fifth and final Sentinels novel, Rubicon, reveals that during the final stage of the war, he was stationed at the Alaska Base facility when it was devastated by the Zentraedi. During this attack, Edwards' face was irreparably scarred, and he forever after wore a half-cowl to cover his wounds. While Rick Hunter had been able to rescue Lisa Hayes from the wreckage of the base, he had not searched for any other survivors, and Edwards' fury at being left for dead by Hunter shaped a grudge he would carry throughout the Sentinels storyline. Edwards is later promoted to the rank of Brigadier General and becomes part of an expedition that leaves Earth on a diplomatic mission to the planet Tirol, homeworld of the Robotech Masters, in hopes of preventing more war. Edwards' personal means of preventing further war though is to conquer all the alien forces that he can, thereby keeping the Earth safe and under his rule. To achieve this, he first seeks to take out Rick Hunter from power. He first attempts to ruin his wedding to Lisa Hayes, then undercuts his every command when the Robotech Expeditionary Force begins its attempt to liberate Tirol from the Invid. He is eventually able to capture the Invid Brain, a living organic computer that controls the Invid troops. By doing so he is able to bring the battle on Tirol to an end, but keeps the Brain sealed away in order to plunder its secrets for himself.

Edwards later begins to obsess over Rick Hunter's old crush Lin Minmei, and resolves to force her into loving him. At the same time he enters into a secret alliance with the Invid Regent, feeding him information on the Sentinels' movements in an attempt to have Rick Hunter killed. Edwards believes he has succeeded in both his goals unaware that Rick and the Sentinels are still alive on the unstable planet Praxis. Edwards invites the Invid Regent to the SDF-3 for peace talks, then manipulates events that lead to the Regent's apparent murder. This action results an escalation of war, and Edwards is able to convince the council to commission the construction of a new fleet of warships. The ships would be placed under his control which he plans to use to take over the Earth. His plans are derailed though by Doctor Emil Lang, who delays him by facilitating the rebellion of the human's Zentraedi allies. Edwards' evil is exposed when representatives of the Sentinels return to Tirol with the Zentraedi and are placed on trial by Edwards over allegations of treason. Doctor Lang is able to trick Edwards into revealing his schemes to the council. His wicked goals laid bare, Edwards kidnaps Minmei and flees Tirol. He covers his escape with an army of Invid mecha controlled by the captive Brain. Edwards escapes to the Invid homeworld of Optera, planning to use its Genesis Pits to engineer a race of monsters that would serve as his army. Ultimately, Edwards perishes when an android made by Dr. Lang holographically disguises herself as Minmei in order to get close to him. She sacrifices herself to tumble him into the Genesis Pit, ending his life.

=== Jack Baker ===
Jack Baker is a fighter pilot candidate before the SDF-3 leaves Earth, he has a strong sense of duty and a "no-one-left-behind" mentality that causes him to fail the War Simulation exam. Even though Max was impressed with his ability and sense of duty, Rick disliked that Baker disobeyed strict orders. The Robotech Expeditionary Force however needs all the pilots they can get so they accept Baker alongside Karen Penn. Jack Baker does well in battle and later becomes the Wolf Pack Leader.

=== Karen Penn ===
Karen Penn first appears in Robotech II: The Sentinels as a 17-year-old test pilot who is granted permission to join the Robotech Expeditionary Force on its mission the day before it is launched. In the Robotech: Prelude to the Shadow Chronicles comic series Karen, now 40 appears briefly as a bridge officer. In the 2006 film Robotech: The Shadow Chronicles, which is set in a later time, she appears as a senior officer. It is not known what becomes of Karen after the Shadow Chronicles series.

=== Emil Lang ===
Dr. Emil Lang (Voiced by: Greg Snegoff) was briefly seen in episodes 5 ("Transformation") and 6 ("Blitzkrieg") of the Macross Saga, and has a larger role in the aborted sequel Robotech II: The Sentinels. Dr. Lang was Earth's chief Robotechnician and has been with Earth Robotechnology development since it was first developed from the crashed SDF-1. It was through his efforts that the SDF-1 was built from the crashed alien ship. In addition to scientific research, Lang is also a politician and diplomat. After the end of the First Robotech War, Dr. Lang is made leader of the Robotech Expeditionary Force. He joins Rick Hunter, Lisa Hayes, and the other heroes of the First Robotech War aboard the SDF-3. Lang who was assisted by an android that he built to act as a spy was instrumental in secretly foiling the plans of certain high-ranking members of the Robotech Expeditionary Force who exploited their positions. During the final phase of the Sentinel's campaign, he works to create new technology out of the notes left behind by the now renegade T. R. Edwards who had made significant breakthroughs using captured Invid technology. Lang is later killed aboard the SDF-3 while testing the Neutron S missiles.

== The Shadow Chronicles characters ==
This era starts with the Prelude comic book and merges The New Generation and The Sentinels eras back together into one.

=== Vince Grant ===
Vince Grant (Voiced by: Richard Epcar) appears in Robotech II: The Sentinels, Robotech: Prelude to the Shadow Chronicles and Robotech: The Shadow Chronicles. Vince is the brother of Claudia Grant, a bridge officer on the SDF-1. Vince's wife, Dr. Jean Grant, gave birth to a son, who they name Bowie Grant. Born at nearly the same time as Dana Sterling, Bowie and Dana become friends and later serve militarily together. Vince also becomes friends with Rick Hunter as he has also lost numerous friends in battle. Vince and Jean later leave earth aboard the SDF-3 Pioneer, the flagship of the newly created Robotech Expeditionary Force. Due to health reasons however, Bowie was unable to come with them. As with Dana he was left under the care of their godfather, General Rolf Emerson. Both Vince and Jean hoped the mission would be over quickly but events keep them away from earth for the rest of Bowie's childhood. During Robotech: Prelude to the Shadow Chronicles, Vince becomes a captain within the Robotech Expeditionary Force. Following the attack against the SDF-3 by the renegade forces of T. R. Edwards and the Invid Vince and Jean are forced to tell Rick that his wife, Lisa Hayes has suffered a miscarriage, causing Rick to collapse in shock and sadness. Vince later takes command of the newly completed Tokogawa, a spacecraft built for the purpose of tracking down and stopping Edwards. Although the Tokogawa is lost in a subsequent battle with Edwards' forces, Vince and Rick are eventually able to track down and stop his sinister plan. Vince is eventually placed in command of the Icarus, another fighter spacecraft. When the SDF-3 fails to return from a test-firing of a super-weapon known as the Neutron-S missile, Vince obtains permission from General Reinhardt to try and look for the ship. Vince eventually makes contact with the severely damaged SDF-3. Rick warns him that the Neutron-S missiles have a critical flaw, and that they cannot be used under any circumstances. Vince attempts to take the SDF-3 into the Icarusbut an unknown ship attacks and rams the SDF-3, throwing it out of range forcing him to leave it behind.

When the Icarus returns to Earth, it comes under attack by several unknown fighters that were also accidentally transported by the ship. Scott Bernard, a resistance-fighter from Earth is able to destroy both attackers using his transformable fighter, allowing the Icarus to land safely for repairs. When Scott reveals that he has fallen in love with Ariel, the daughter of the Invid Regress, Vince and General Reinhardt are reluctant to believe his warning that a new threat is about to emerge. Both believe that the Invid are simply trying to drive a wedge between the Robotech Expeditionary Force and the Haydonites, the highly advanced cybernetic race that provided them with much of its advanced technology. When Space Station Liberty comes under attack, Vince takes the Icarus to investigate. Upon arriving, Vince realizes how serious the situation is as the attackers appear to be exploiting hidden weaknesses in the new technology. It then becomes apparent through Ariel's earlier warning that the Haydonites themselves are the attackers. As more REF ships are destroyed due to weaknesses in their weapons/defenses Grant realizes that every piece of technology the Haydonites have given to the Robotech Expeditionary Force is equipped with some kind of Trojan horse. Grant realizes that the Icarus is equipped with Haydonite technology and therefore is no longer a viable ship. He orders it to dock at Space Station Liberty and evacuate all personnel to the massive colony ship Ark Angel, which has no Haydonite technology installed. Vince and Scott then ride through Liberty until they reach the remaining supply of Neutron-S missiles in storage on the station. After rigging them for detonation, Vince and Scott board the Ark Angel and slowly depart from the station. When the haydonite vessels to move in to attempt and destroy it the Ark Angel teleports and the missiles detonate, destroying Liberty and the entire Haydonite fleet. Vince is then ordered to take the Ark Angel and search for the SDF-3, which may not have been destroyed. Like the others, Vince can only hope the SDF-3 has survived and that if it has, that the Ark Angel can reach it before the Haydonites.

=== Maia Sterling ===
Maia Sterling (Voiced by: Edie Mirman) appears briefly in the Wildstorm comic Robotech: Prelude to the Shadow Chronicles and is a major character in the movie Robotech: The Shadow Chronicles. Lieutenant Commander Maia Sterling is a daughter of Max Sterling and Miriya Sterling, and is Dana Sterling's younger sister. Like her sister, Dana, she is half human and half Zentraedi. Unlike Dana though who was born on Earth, Maia was born in space. On board Space Station Liberty, Maia discusses the upcoming offensive against the Invid with Commander Daryl Taylor of the Wolf Squadron as well as Taylor's selection of pilots Alex Romero and Marcus Rush for his Squadron. In Robotech: The Shadow Chronicles, shortly before the full-scale assault on Earth to dislodge the Invid who have occupied the planet for 13 years, Maia is promoted to leader of the Skull Squadron. During the battle Maia saves the lives of a number of other pilots, including Marcus Rush and Alex Romero. General Reinhart decides to merge the Wolf and Skull squadrons after the battle, which places both Marcus and Alex under her command. Maia becomes annoyed after she overhears Marcus, who has lost both his sister and his commanding officer to the Invid, stating that all aliens should be wiped out. Maia tells him that she is half-alien and reminds him that if all aliens were wiped out, she would not have been able to save his life during the battle.

When the Haydonites, turn on the Robotech Expeditionary Force, Maia initially leads her squadron into battle, but is called back by Captain Vince Grant after the technology the Haydonites gave to the Robotech Expeditionary Force contain weaknesses that the Haydonites are exploiting. Unable to fight back, the squadron retreats but is pursued by Haydonite fighters. Alex Romero tries to engage them but his weapons malfunction, and his fighter becomes stalled. Despite the pleas of Maia and Marcus for Alex to eject, he flies into the enemy squadron. His fighter explodes destroying himself and all of the enemy fighters upsetting both Maia and Marcus. After retreating to Space Station Liberty, Maia and her squadron acquire new technology for their fighters. Vince Grant orders Maia's squadron to hold the Haydonites long enough to evacuate Liberty's personnel to the massive colony ship Ark Angel and to prepare the Liberty for detonation. During the battle, Maia's fighter takes damage and she is forced to eject. Marcus grabs Maia's ejection pod and throws it towards the teleporting Ark Angel. Marcus then launches a suicide run against the Haydonites to hold them off and Ariel uses her teleportation power to save him. Later on board the Ark Angel, Maia and Marcus console each other over the recent events. Maia later puts her head on Marcus's shoulder and the two look out a viewport as the Ark Angel flies over Earth's surface.

=== Marlene Rush ===
Marlene Rush is an officer in the Robotech Expeditionary Force in the Third Generation of Robotech and Robotech: The Shadow Chronicles. She has one sibling, a younger brother named Marcus. Marlene Rush became Scott Bernard's girlfriend and he proposed to her before he went into battle. Both are part of the 21st Mars Division of the Robotech Expeditionary Force which launched an attack against the Invid that had invaded the earth 11 years earlier. The attack proves disastrous, as the Invid's superior numbers overwhelm and destroy the entire division. As Marlene's ship attempted to enter Earth's atmosphere and land on the planet, it comes under Invid attack and is destroyed, killing everyone aboard.

Before Marlene died, she gave a gift to Scott, a pendant that is able to show a hologram of herself, which Scott keeps with him as he joins a resistance movement against the Invid. Marcus Rush, has his own pendant which is able to show a hologram of her and Scott Bernard together. Marcus carries this pendant with him all the time, and places a mark on it for each Invid that he kills in battle. Her death results in him harboring a deep hatred of the Invid. At the end of The Shadow Chronicles, Marlene briefly appears to Marcus in a vision from beyond the grave to tell him that he must go on living, but that she will always be with him.

=== Marcus Rush ===
Marcus Rush appears briefly in the last issue of Robotech: Prelude to the Shadow Chronicles and becomes a major character in the movie Robotech: The Shadow Chronicles as one of the main protagonists. In Robotech: The Shadow Chronicles after his sister's death, Marcus becomes a fighter pilot to help continue the mission to stop the Invid and free Earth from its occupation. As a result of his sister's death he develops a deep hatred for the Invid. Scott Bernard, who was Marlene's fiancé, survived the assault who unbeknownst to Marcus, has fallen in love with Ariel, the humanoid daughter of the Invid Regess. He is visibly upset with Marcus due to his hate towards the Invid. Scott later tries to convince him that Ariel chose to stay behind with him to give a warning and that she is not the enemy, but Marcus refuses to believe him. Ariel ends up being right about a new threat in the form of the Haydonites, another hostile alien race. The Haydonites shortly after kill Marcus's best friend which devastates him.

During the battle, Maia's fighter is damaged and she is forced to eject. Marcus uses his fighters' robotic arms to grab Maia's capsule and throw it towards the Ark Angel as it prepares to teleport. Marcus, deciding he has nothing left to live for, holds down his weapon triggers and launches a suicide run against the Haydonites to hold them off long enough for the Ark Angel to activate its teleportation to escape. As the missiles he fired detonate he has a vision where he sees his sister Marlene, who tells him that it is not his time to die but that she will always be with him. Marcus pleads for her not to go but then awakens on board the Ark Angel with Ariel kneeling by his side. Ariel reveals that she used her teleportation ability to save his life. Marcus, surprised to be alive asks Ariel why she saved his life to which she responds "hatred can only breed more hatred". As the Ark Angel approaches the newly liberated Earth, Maia thanks Marcus for saving her life. As the movie ends, the two look out a window as the Ark Angel flies over Earth's surface, which neither of them had seen before.
