= Robotech II: The Sentinels =

1988 American animated film

- Region 1 DVD release cover
- Directed by: Carl Macek
- Written by: Carl Macek
- Produced by: Ahmed Agrama; Hiroshi Ōnogi
- Starring: Tony Oliver; Melanie McQueen; Rebecca Forstadt
- Music by: Michael Bradley; Jack Goga; Ulpio Minucci; Arlon Ober; Steve Wittmack
- Production companies: Harmony Gold USA; Tatsunoko Productions
- Distributed by: Streamline Pictures
- Release date: September 1988 (VHS)
- Running time: 72 minutes
- Countries: United States; Japan
- Language: English

Robotech II: The Sentinels is a 1988 American animated film written and directed by Carl Macek. Part of the Robotech franchise, it is set between the events of The Macross Saga and The Masters from the original 1985 television series. The film follows Rick Hunter, now a major general, as he leads Earth's forces aboard a new space station on a diplomatic mission to the Robotech Masters, while the Masters find themselves under attack from the Invid.

The Sentinels was intended by Harmony Gold as a new television series that would feature characters and elements from all three Robotech sagas. Unlike the original series, which was created from footage of existing anime, The Sentinels mostly uses original animation. Only three of the planned 65 episodes were animated before the project was canceled in 1986 due to a lack of funding. Macek turned the existing footage into a film, which was released to home media. The unfinished source material received several different adaptations that provided alternate continuations of the story.

== Background ==
The feature-length pilot is composed of the only three episodes that were produced. It introduces the SDF-3, along with its crew, and gives an overview of their new mission. The title refers to the Sentinels, an alien resistance movement encountered by the Robotech Expeditionary Force (REF) that consists of races subjugated by the Robotech Masters or the Invid. The significant events in the film include Lin Minmei making peace with Admiral Lisa Hayes well enough to sing at her wedding to Major General Rick Hunter and the Invid's brutal invasion of the Robotech Masters homeworld of Tirol.

Being a sequel/spinoff to the combined series, The Sentinels featured characters from all three Robotech sagas, including Rick Hunter, Lisa Hayes (later Lisa Hayes-Hunter), Max Sterling, Miriya Parina Sterling, Exedore and Breetai from The Macross Saga, Dana Sterling, Bowie Grant, and a couple of their superiors from Masters, in addition to Jonathan Wolff and the Invid Regis of The New Generation (Scott Bernard was also planned, though never appeared in the confines of the feature). Among the newly created characters were young cadet rivals Jack Baker and Karen Penn, whose early love-hate relationship mirrored Rick and Lisa's; Vince Grant, brother of Claudia Grant, and father of Bowie Grant; and the Invid Regent, the villainous leader of the Invid. Dr. Emil Lang, a supporting character in the Macross Saga, would return as a main character. The story also introduces a human adversary in the form of T. R. Edwards, who was first introduced in Comico's Robotech: The Graphic Novel.

== Production history ==
The Tatsunoko Production animation studio assigned the first script drafts to writers Sukehiro Tomita (Macross, Mospeada) and Hiroshi Ohnogi (Macross). According to director Carl Macek, the Japanese animators initially tried to relate the project to the original versions of Macross, Southern Cross, and Mospeada, until Harmony Gold explained the differences made in Robotech's adaptation with diagrams and charts. When the animators focused on new characters instead of Rick Hunter and the other characters derived from the original Macross series, Macek ended up reassigning the scriptwriting to American writers, headed by script supervisor Kent Butterworth to refocus the project.

Carl Macek's original plan was to have 13 weekly story arcs consisting of 5 episodes each. Each 5-episode arc could then be edited into a 2-hour movie and sold on home video for additional revenue.

Upon viewing the completed animation, Macek felt that scenes featuring new characters (such as Jack Baker, Karen Penn and The Invid Regent) had received much more care and attention by the animators than those with the original Macross characters (Rick Hunter, Lisa Hunter, Max Sterling). Macek believed that Tatsunoko secretly intended to re-use this higher-quality footage for a Japan-only sequel to Genesis Climber MOSPEADA - one of the Japanese series that had been adapted into the original Robotech series.

== Mechanical designers ==
- Studio Ammonite (Hiroshi Ogawa, Hiroshi Okura, and Takashi Ono.)

== Cancellation ==
Macek blamed the cancellation of the series on the crash of the Dollar/Yen exchange rate in the mid-1980s, which caused toy partner Matchbox to withdraw from the project due to the increased cost. Since Harmony Gold lacked the funds to produce the series on its own, production ceased after only three episodes.

== TV and home video release ==
Macek collected the usable footage from the aborted Sentinels project into a feature film that was first released on VHS in September 1988 by Robotech Role-Playing Game publisher Palladium Books. Macek's own Streamline Pictures released it again in 1992.

In the US, the film ran on the television stations KXTX in Dallas, Texas and KMGT in Honolulu, Hawaii in the Fall of 1989. It later ran on The Movie Channel in the UK at various times during 1992 and 1993.

The Sentinels feature was included on DVD as an extra with the third volume of the Robotech Legacy Collection and the complete Protoculture Collection, from ADV Films. The disc includes the option of a voiceover commentary by Macek (mostly read directly from the comprehensive Robotech Art 3: The Sentinels), in which he discusses some of the aspects of the production.

In 2011, a "remastered" version was released on the A&E DVD set, Robotech: The Complete Original Series. This version has opening titles resembling those found on the Robotech Remastered DVDs, as well as a new ending with text explaining the fate of the SDF-3. Also, all of the flashback footage used from "The Macross Saga" has been removed, along with re-used footage from the episode "Wedding Bells."

Funimation announced in October 2019 that they have licensed the Robotech series, Robotech: The Shadow Chronicles and Robotech II: The Sentinels. Funimation began streaming them on August 24, 2021.

== Adaptations ==
Despite its cancellation, Harmony Gold provided the unfinished Sentinels source material for adaptation by several different parties, resulting in several different versions of the same continuity. Macek's original outline and notes for the series were published by The Donning Company as Robotech Art 3: The Sentinels.

=== Novelizations ===
In 1988, authors James Luceno and Brian Daley (both writing under the pseudonym Jack McKinney) completed a series of novels adapting the Sentinels storyline, released in paperback.

- Robotech #13 - The Sentinels: The Devil's Hand
- Robotech #14 - The Sentinels: Dark Powers
- Robotech #15 - The Sentinels: Death Dance
- Robotech #16 - The Sentinels: World Killers
- Robotech #17 - The Sentinels: Rubicon

Robotech #18 - The End of the Circle (1989), although not technically a Sentinels novel, did wrap up all of the outstanding issues from both the Sentinels and the first 12 books.

=== Comics ===
The Waltrip brothers adapted the novels into comic books, though they diverged from the novels as the story progressed. The Sentinels comics were published by Eternity Comics, then Academy Comics. The storyline abruptly ended when Academy was unable to renew their license with Harmony Gold. The comics license passed to Antarctic Press, who published The Sentinels: Rubicon, which draws its name from the title of the fifth Sentinels novel. However, the Rubicon comic, instead of completing the Sentinels story, is set years after the end of the Sentinels Campaign, and was not illustrated by the Waltrips. It was not popular with fans, due to the poor artwork and the lack of connection to The Sentinels. It was cancelled after only two issues.

The Waltrips returned in 2005 to adapt elements of the last McKinney Sentinels novel into Robotech: Prelude to the Shadow Chronicles, a comic book miniseries which also serves as a prequel to the animated 2006 feature film Robotech: The Shadow Chronicles. This prelude miniseries, while picking up roughly where the previous Sentinels comics ended, also acknowledges the official 2003 rebooting of the Robotech universe. While the events of Sentinels are still seen to have happened, it is now agreed that certain events and situations have been retconned both before and during the events in Prelude.

=== Role-playing game ===
Palladium Books had published a role-playing game called Robotech in 1986 that was based on the original anime television series. The following year, with the new Sentinels storyline, Palladium adapted the Sentinels material — and the move away from Earth and into deep space — into its Robotech II: The Sentinels role-playing game.
