= Waltrip brothers =

Writers

Jason Waltrip and John Waltrip (born 1963) are identical twins who comprise a comic book art and writing team, known for their work on Robotech comics and in webcomics.

== Comics career ==
The Waltrips were discovered by a talent scout in 1987 who was sent a copy of their amateur comic called CyberKnights. They first became publicly known for their work on Robotech II: The Sentinels, for Eternity Comics in 1988, despite earlier efforts for Steve Jackson Games on the Car Wars game line. They soon followed up with other spin-off comic series such as Robotech Genesis: The Legend of Zor along with work on occasional swimsuit issues.

Their work on the comic adaptation of The Sentinels spanned two publishers, Eternity and Academy Comics through 1996, longer than any other Robotech creative team. However, The Sentinels comic series ended prematurely after four of five planned parts had been published. A purported follow up series by Antarctic Press, Robotech: Sentinels Rubicon, bore no resemblance to any previous (or subsequent) Robotech material, and was itself cancelled after only two issues.

In 2005, the Waltrips picked up from where they left off with Robotech: Prelude to the Shadow Chronicles, a 5-part comic book miniseries which bridged their work on The Sentinels with the new animated film Robotech: The Shadow Chronicles.

The Waltrips also inked Sokora Refugees for Tokyopop. Jason alone drew some stories for Djustine, Calavera and other adult comics created and written by Italian author Enrico Teodorani, published in Italy and the United States.

The two have also had a lengthy career in webcomics. Jason has drawn Fans since 1999, and John drew the complete Rip and Teri. Jason replaced Gisele Lagace as the artist for the webcomic Penny and Aggie in 2008 and remained through the run of its spinoff, QUILTBAG. The two have reteamed to take over the art on the ongoing feature, Guilded Age, from 2010 to the present.

== Bibliography ==
- Amazon Gazonga (1 issue, Academy Comics, Oct. 1995)
- CyberKnights
- BoHoS (3 issues, Image Comics, 1998)
- Calavera
- Djustine
- Metal Bikini (6 issues, Eternity Comics, 1990–1991); (6 issues, Academy Comics, 1996)
- Robotech II: The Sentinels (16 issues, Eternity, 1988–1990)
- Robotech Genesis: The Legend of Zor (6 issues, Eternity, 1992–1993)
- Robotech: Prelude to the Shadow Chronicles (5 issues, DC/Wildstorm, 2005–2006)
- Sokora Refugees (2 issues, TokyoPop, 2006–2007)
- Tsunami Girl (3 issues, Image Comics, 1999)
