= Edie Mirman =

American actress

- Other names: Penny Sweet, Edie S. Mirman
- Occupations: Voice actress, owner Edie's Gourmet Looping..Post Production Co., writer, producer
- Years active: 1970–present

Edie Mirman is an American voice actress.

She's best known as the voice of Gatomon and Angewomon in the Digimon series. She revoiced hundreds of episodes of series work in the United States and abroad, also for many animated characters, including the voice of Fujiko Mine from Tales of the Wolf and for both Miriya Parina Sterling and Nova Satori from Robotech. She is credited alternately as Penny Sweet and Edie S. Mirman. She is the owner of Edie's Gourmet Looping, specializing in ADR/Looping for Film and Television. She wrote The Dibbledab Tale, It's a Girl Thing, Homer and Althea.

== Filmography ==
=== Animation English dubbing ===
- Bio Hunter - Additional Voices
- Casshan: Robot Hunter - Luna
- Crying Freeman - Emu Hino
- Dragon Ball - Launch (Marilynn) (Harmony Gold dub)
- Digimon Adventure - Salamon, Gatomon, Angewomon
- Digimon Adventure 02 - Salamon, Gatomon, Angewomon, Nefertimon, Silphymon (shared with Neil Kaplan)
- El Hazard: The Magnificent World - Princess Rune Venus
- Grimm's Fairy Tale Classics - Grandmother (Little Red Riding Hood)
- Honeybee Hutch - Honey Queen Bee
- Iczer-One - Girl
- Tales of the Wolf - Fujiko Mine (Streamline version)
- Maple Town - Miss Deer
- Moldiver - TV Reporter
- Nadia: The Secret of Blue Water - Electra (Streamline dub)
- Noozles - Sandy's Grandmother/Mark's Mother
- Orguss 02 - Queen Miran
- Robotech - Miriya Parina Sterling, Nova Satori
- The Big O - Additional Voices
- Trigun - Additional Voices
- Vampire Hunter D - Lamika

=== Animation ===
- Dogtanian and the Three Muskehounds - Milady
- The Little Polar Bear - Grandmother, Lemming 3
- Spider-Man - Illyena
- Transformers: Robots in Disguise - Additional Voices
- Willy Fog 2 - Various

=== Films ===
- Captain Underpants: The First Epic Movie - ADR Group
- Despicable Me - Additional Voices
- Digimon: The Movie - Gatomon, Angewomon, Magnadramon, Recorded Operator
- Digimon: Revenge of Diaboromon - Gatomon, Angewomon
- Digimon Adventure: Our War Game! (standalone dub) - Gatomon, Recorded Operator
- Digimon Adventure 02: Digimon Hurricane Touchdown!! / Transcendent Evolution! The Golden Digimentals (standalone dub) - Gatomon, Angewomon, Magnadramon
- Epic - Flower Jinn
- Fist of the North Star - Screamer
- From Up on Poppy Hill - Hana Matsuzaki
- The Professional: Golgo 13 - Laura Dawson
- Howl's Moving Castle - Additional Voice
- Kiki's Delivery Service - Barsa, Ursula (Streamline dub)
- Kung Fu Panda: Secrets of the Masters - Mom Bunny
- Lensman - Clarissa "Chris" MacDougal (Debut role)
- Madagascar: Escape 2 Africa - Telephone Recording
- Mulan - Additional Voices
- Mystery of Mamo - Fujiko Mine (Streamline version)
- Nausicaa of the Valley of the Wind - Additional Voices
- My Neighbor Totoro - Teacher, Old Woman (Streamline dub)
- ParaNorman - Blithe Hollow Townsperson
- Robotech: The Shadow Chronicles - Maia Sterling
- Space Pirate Captain Harlock - Kayla "Kay" Kerry, Headmistress Marano
- The Boss Baby - The Big Boss Baby
- The Hunchback of Notre Dame II - Additional Voices
- The Castle of Cagliostro - Fujiko Mine (Streamline version)
- The Prince of Light - Sita
- The Wind Rises - Jiro's Mother
- Tron: Legacy - Computer Voice
- Wicked City - Kanako/Spider Woman
- Zeiram - Iria

=== Music ===
- Jin Jin - Additional Voices

=== Video games ===
- CSI (game series) - Catherine Willows
- Terror T.R.A.X: Track of the Vampire (PC) - Officer Allison Walkin, Ether Voice
- Star Trek: Judgment Rites - Boy, Pupils
- Star Wars: Masters of Teräs Käsi - Arden Lyn, Mara Jade
- Star Wars: X-Wing vs. TIE Fighter - Additional Voices
