= Genesis Climber MOSPEADA =

Japanese anime television series

- Blu-ray box cover
- 機甲創世記モスピーダ
- Genre: Mecha; Adventure; Military sci-fi
- Developed by: Sukehiro Tomita
- Directed by: Katsuhisa Yamada
- Music by: Hiroshi Ogasawara (Note: Also known by the stage names Kan Ogasawara and Utollo Teshikai); Joe Hisaishi
- Opening theme: "Ushinawareta Yume o Motomete" by Andy Koyama
- Ending theme: "Blue Rain" by Andy Koyama and Mine Matsuki
- Country of origin: Japan
- Original language: Japanese
- No. of episodes: 25

Production
- Executive producer: Kenji Yoshida
- Producers: Shinji Aramaki; Masatoshi Yui
- Editor: Yukio Tanigawa
- Production companies: Fuji Television; Tatsunoko Production; Anime Friend

Original release
- Network: FNS (Fuji TV)
- Release: October 2, 1983 – March 23, 1984

Related
Further information
Original video animation
Love Live Alive
Directed by	Katsuhisa Yamada
Produced by	Masatoshi Yui; Shinji Aramaki
Written by	Sukehiro Tomita
Music by	Joe Hisaishi
Studio	Tatsunoko Produciton
Licensed by	AUS: Beyond Home Entertainment (expired); NA: A&E Networks Home Entertainment (expired)
Released	September 21, 1985
Runtime	50 minutes

Genesis Climber MOSPEADA (Japanese: 機甲創世記モスピーダ, Hepburn: Kikō Sōseiki Mosupīda; lit. 'Armored Genesis MOSPEADA') is an anime science-fiction series produced by Tatsunoko Production. The 25-episode television series ran from late 1983 to early 1984 in Japan. MOSPEADA is an acronym of "Military Operation Soldier Protection Emergency Aviation Dive Armor", one of the transformable motorcycle-armors the series features. The other primary mecha featured in the show is the three-form transformable fighter called the Armo-Fighter AFC-01 Legioss. MOSPEADA was adapted as the third generation of the American series Robotech, much like Macross and Southern Cross.

== Story ==
In the 21st century, Earth's pollution problems result in the development of a new hydrogen fuel called "HBT" as an alternative to fossil fuels, while mankind colonizes Mars. In 2050, a mysterious alien race called the Inbit invades Earth, the ensuing war leaves only a few pockets of human resistance on the planet's surface. Many of the refugees escape aboard a few remaining shuttles to seek shelter on the Moon. The Inbit set up their main base of operations on Earth, called "Reflex Point", in the Great Lakes area of North America.

However, the Mars colony, dubbed the Mars Base, does not forget about the plight of Earth. Troops are sent in to fight the Inbit from the Moon, only to fail miserably. The Inbit do not attack Mars and show no interest towards the other planets. Surprisingly, the aliens show no hostility towards humans unless they are directly provoked. The Inbit can also sense the presence of HBT and use of the fuel is limited under their supervision, as HBT is a common component in weapons technology. Mars Base becomes a gigantic military factory, producing vast amounts of advanced weaponry and trained troops. In 2080, Mars Base sends an expeditionary force to liberate the planet from the Inbit—but it is virtually destroyed despite a technological advantage including the deployment of transformable mecha.

A Second Expeditionary Force is dispatched three years but destroyed in a ferocious battle in orbit around the Earth, Legioss pilot Stig Barnard turns out to be the only survivor as he crashlands in South America, but his fiancée, Marlene, is killed in the chaos. A holographic recording of Marlene given to Stig just before the operation began gives him the strength to move on and avenge her death. In his quest to reach Reflex Point, he meets the other main characters of the show, forming a group of ragtag freedom fighters in a quest to rid the planet of the Inbit.

As the plot unfolds, the purpose of the Inbit invasion is revealed: to find a suitable place to evolve into more complex beings. However, the Inbit do not know that their endeavor actually threatens to cause the extinction of both humans and Inbit and thus, it is up to Stig and his group, with the help of humanoid Inbit (Aisha and Solzie), to convince Inbit's hive queen, the Refless, to flee from Earth.

== Characters ==
The Robotech-adapted names are in brackets: [ ].

- Stig Barnard (スティック・バーナード, Sutikku Bānādo) [Scott Bernard] (Bin Shimada): A 20-year-old Mars Base lieutenant who becomes stranded on Earth as the Inbit obliterate the defenses of the Second Earth Recapture Force. As a result of the overwhelming force of the Inbit, Stig's fiancée, Marlene (マリーン, Marīn), is killed when her ship attempts to land on the planet surface, leaving Stig angry and bitter. Even after he gathers his freedom fighters together, he often allows his hatred towards the Inbit to distract him from the responsible decision-making his friends know he is capable of. In the end, however, he finds his peace again as he becomes aware of his growing feelings for Aisha, despite her Inbit background.
- Ray (レイ, Rei) [Rand] (Hisao Ōyama): A 17-year-old scavenger who likes repairing motorcycles, and plays the role of the historian and wisecracker of the group. He usually wears brown casual clothing and goggles. Originally, Ray was a loner who actually enjoyed teasing the Inbit as they chased him around the territory, but he joins Stig in order to deal a serious blow to the invaders. He is good at crafts and outdoor activities, cutting down trees to make props, and even killing leeches when his friends are attacked by them. Extremely resourceful and with a good intuition, Ray is the first in the group who gradually manages to figure out important clues about the Inbit's true nature. He is a huge fan of Yellow Belmont until he learns that the female singer is actually a man. Over the course of the series, he is a caring man, willing to take care of Mint, and develops deep feelings for Houquet, but she is slow to warm up to his affections.
- Mint La Blue (ミント・ラブル, Minto Raburu) [Annie "Mint" La Belle] (Sanae Miyuki (credited as Miyuki Muroi)): A spirited and precocious 13-year-old girl who was abandoned by her parents. She tags along with the group in order to find a husband, but ends up becoming part of the team. Often considered an annoyance to the rest of the group, Mint is nonetheless loved by her fellow freedom fighters, and proves herself valuable to the mission on several occasions. Her trademark attire is the E.T. cap that she wears. It is not known whether the E.T. stands for the science-fiction movie of the same name or something else.
- Houquet et Rose (フーケ・エローズ, Fūke Erōzu) [Rook Bartley] (Mika Doi): A 16-year-old former motorcycle gang member and girlfriend to gang leader, Romy. She was severely beaten and taken advantage of by a rival gang when they cornered her away from her group. Houquet initially fights for the helpless and refuses an alliance with Stig, but joins the team after realizing that she would be stronger with them than without them. Eventually she comes to respect her companions enough that she offers to sacrifice herself in order to save the others. She eventually falls in love with Ray, but for most of the series is unable to open her heart and express her feelings to him.
- Jim Warston (ジム・ウォーストン, Jimu Wōsuton) [Jim "Lunk" Austin] (Tomomichi Nishimura): A 32-year-old maintenance mechanic. Jim was once a member of the Mars Base forces, but deserted after failing to save a friend from the Inbit. Though he labeled himself a coward and often sees himself as a liability to Stig's team, the team is quick to object to this, noting Jim's courage and dependability during their repeated encounters with Inbit forces.
- Yellow Belmont (イエロー・ベルモント, Ierō Berumonto) [Lance "Lancer" Belmont] (Mine Matsuki)/(Hirotaka Suzuoki): A 22-year-old soldier from the Second Expeditionary Force. He poses as both a male soldier and as a female singer, in order to hide from the Inbit and certain locals. Yellow has made quite a name for himself as an entertainer, but upon meeting Stig and his friends, Yellow decides to help free Earth from the Inbit. His ability to completely change both his physical appearance and personality adds to the team's ability to infiltrate towns and cities in order to gather supplies or complete missions. His stage name in Robotech was Yellow Dancer.
- Aisha (アイシャ, Aisha) [Ariel/Marlene] (Miki Takahashi): A female Inbit changed into humanoid form as part of an experiment to adapt the Inbit to Terran conditions. (In Robotech, she was given the name Marlene after Scott (Stig)'s late fiancée. When they first meet her, she has amnesia and is unable to tell the group her real name. She gradually develops human emotions and sympathies, and ends up falling in love with Stig.
- Refless (レフレス, Refuresu) [Regess] (Noriko Ohara): The Inbit's hive queen is seeking to xenoform the Earth to make it suitable for Inbit colonization. She is presented as a non-corporeal alien intelligence who condemns human beings for being genetically and socially inferior.
- Solzie (ソルジィ, Sorujī) [Sera] (Waka Kanda): Another female Inbit transformed into humanoid form. Accidentally encounters Yellow as he is bathing in a waterfall, and the encounter leaves her resolve shaken as she slowly begins to fall in love with him. Eventually, she becomes the first Inbit to independently sympathize with the human cause.
- Battlar (バットラー, Battorā) [Corg] (Hōchū Ōtsuka): The sole male Inbit in the series changed into humanoid form. Unlike Aisha and Solzie, Battlar's experiences with Stig's team leaves him angry and insulted. His repeated defeat in combat by Stig causes Battlar to make his mission of stopping Stig's group a personal vendetta.

The English-subtitled MOSPEADA DVD released by Harmony Gold and ADV Films uses the inaccurate names (such as "Mint Rubble", "Houquet Emrose", and "Jim Auston") derived from fans on Robotech.com and the Robotech Art I book.

== Episode list ==
Original Japanese air date	Genesis Climber MOSPEADA episode	Directed by	Written by	Robotech: The New Generation episode
October 2, 1983	1. Prelude to the Offensive (襲撃のプレリュード, Shūgeki no Pureryūdo)	Directed by : Tatsuya Kasahara; Storyboarded by : Katsuhisa Yamada	Sukehiro Tomita	61. The Invid Invasion
October 9, 1983	2. The Broken-Hearted Girl's March (失恋少女のマーチ, Shitsuren Shōjo no Māchi)	Directed by : Masayuki Kojima; Storyboarded by : Katsuhisa Yamada	Sukehiro Tomita	62. The Lost City
October 16, 1983	3. Showdown Concert at High Noon (真昼の決闘コンサート, Mahiru no Kettou Konsāto)	Katsuhito Akiyama	Sukehiro Tomita	63. Lonely Soldier Boy
October 23, 1983	4. Survival Song Feeling (気分はサバイバル・ソング, Kibun wa Sabaibaru Songu)	Directed by : Masayuki Kojima; Storyboarded by : Saburo Nodera	Ryo Yasumura	64. Survival
October 30, 1983	5. Live Inn Plunder Operation (ライブ・イン・強奪作戦, Raibu In Gōdatsu Sakusen)	Directed by : Yusaku Saotome; Storyboarded by : Hiroyuki Oshii	Satoshi Namiki	65. Curtain Call
November 6, 1983	6. Support Girl Blues (突ッ張り少女ブルース, Tsuppari Shōjo Burūsu)	Directed by : Mari Kobayashi; Storyboarded by : Masayuki Kojima	Sukehiro Tomita	66. Hard Times
November 13, 1983	7. Fallen Hero's Ragtime (亡き勇者のラグタイム, Naki Yūsha no Ragutaimu)	Directed by : Yusaku Saotome; Storyboarded by : Saburo Nodera	Satoshi Namiki	67. Paper Hero
November 20, 1983	8. Jonathan's Elegy (ジョナサンのエレジー, Jonasan no Erejī)	Directed by : Mari Kobayashi; Storyboarded by : Masayuki Kojima	Ryo Yasumura	68. Eulogy
November 27, 1983	9. Lost World Fugue (ロスト・ワールド遁走曲, Rosuto Wārudo Tonsōkyoku)	Masakazu Yasumura	Sukehiro Tomita	69. The Genesis Pit
December 4, 1983	10. Requiem of the Battlefield (戦場のレクイエム, Senjō no Rekuiemu)	Directed by : Mari Kobayashi; Storyboarded by : Masayuki Kojima	Ryo Yasumura	70. Enter Marlene
December 11, 1983	11. Lullaby of Distant Hope (遠い希望のララバイ, Tōi Kibō no Rarabai)	Katsuhito Akiyama	Satoshi Namiki	71. The Secret Route
December 18, 1983	12. Fortress Breakthrough Boogie (要塞突破ブギ, Yōsai Toppa Bugi)	Directed by : Mari Kobayashi; Storyboarded by : Masayuki Kojima	Kenji Terada	72. The Fortress
December 25, 1983	13. Sandstorm Playback (砂嵐プレイバック, Suna-arashi Pureibakku)	Directed by : Yusaku Saotome; Storyboarded by : Saburo Nodera	Sukehiro Tomita	73. Sandstorm
January 8, 1984	14. Mint's Wedding March (ミントの結婚行進曲, Minto no Kekkonkōshinkyoku)	Directed by : Mari Kobayashi; Storyboarded by : Masayuki Kojima	Kenji Terada	74. Annie's Wedding
January 15, 1984	15. The Ballad of Breaking Up (仲間割れのバラード, Nakamaware no Barādo)	Directed by : Tatsuya Kasahara; Storyboarded by : Norio Yazawa	Sukehiro Tomita	75. Separate Ways
January 22, 1984	16. Trap Reggae (トラップ・レゲエ, Torappu Regē)	Directed by : Mari Kobayashi; Storyboarded by : Masayuki Kojima	Satoshi Namiki	76. Metamorphosis
January 29, 1984	17. White Night Serenade (白夜のセレナーデ, Hakuya no Serenāde)	Masakazu Yasumura	Ryo Yasumura	77. The Midnight Sun
February 5, 1984	18. The Nature of Old Soldier's Polka (老兵たちのポルカ, Rōhei-tachi no Poruka)	Directed by : Mari Kobayashi; Storyboarded by : Masayuki Kojima	Kenji Terada	78. Ghost Town
February 12, 1984	19. Forte of the Glacier City (氷河都市のフォルテ, Hyōga Toshi no Forute)	Directed by : Yusaku Saotome; Storyboarded by : Saburo Nodera	Satoshi Namiki	79. Frost Bite
February 19, 1984	20. Birthday Song of the Night Sky (夜空のバースディ・ソング, Yozora no Bāsudi Songu)	Directed by : Mari Kobayashi; Storyboarded by : Masayuki Kojima	Sukehiro Tomita	80. Birthday Blues
February 26, 1984	21. Arpeggio of Murder (殺しのアルペジオ, Koroshi no Arupejio)	Directed by : Tatsuya Kasahara; Storyboarded by : Hiromichi Matano	Kenji Terada	81. Hired Gun
March 4, 1984	22. New York Bebop (ニューヨーク・ビーバップ, Nyū Yōku Bībappu)	Directed by : Mari Kobayashi; Storyboarded by : Masayuki Kojima	Kenji Terada	82. The Big Apple
March 11, 1984	23. Black Hair's Partita (黒髪のパルティータ, Kokuhatsu no Parutīta)	Directed by : Yusaku Saotome; Storyboarded by : Saburo Nodera	Sukehiro Tomita	83. Reflex Point
March 18, 1984	24. The Dark Finale (闇のフィナーレ, Yami no Fināre)	Directed by : Mari Kobayashi; Storyboarded by : Masayuki Kojima	Sukehiro Tomita	84. Dark Finale
March 25, 1984	25. Symphony of Light (光のシンフォニー, Hikari no Shinfonī)	Directed by : Tatsuya Kasahara; Storyboarded by : Katsuhisa Yamada	Sukehiro Tomita	85. Symphony of Light

== Music ==
Opening theme

- "Ushinawareta Yume o Motomete" (失われた伝説(ゆめ)をもとめて; "In Search of Lost Dreams")
  - Composed by Yukihide Takekawa; lyric by Masao Urino; arranged by Joe Hisaishi
  - Vocals: Andy Koyama

Ending theme

- "Blue Rain" (ブルー・レイン, Burū Rein)
  - Composed by Yukihide Takekawa; lyric by Masao Urino; arranged by Joe Hisaishi
  - Vocals: Andy Koyama and Mine Matsuki

The incidental music was composed by Joe Hisaishi, who would later gain renown for incidental music for the movies of Hayao Miyazaki, though it is accidentally credited, because of a misreading of the name characters, to a "Yuzuru Hisaishi". MOSPEADA is the first anime series to have a jazz-based theme song ("Blue Rain").

Malaysian indie rock band Hujan made their own cover of the opening song titled Lonely Soldier Boy (derived from one of the lyrics' English lines) where the lyrics are entirely translated from Japanese into Malay, except for the English lines which are left intact. The song was included in the band's album, also named after the song.

== Production ==
The original working titles for MOSPEADA were: Kouka Kihei Vector ("Descent Machine Soldier Vector"), Chou Fumetsu Yousai Reflex Point ("Super Immortal Fortress Reflex Point") and AD Patrol: the story of city police where the main character rides a transformable bike that changes into his partner. The main character designs were created by Yoshitaka Amano, who would later gain renown for his character artwork for the Final Fantasy series.

Each of the Japanese episode titles contains a musical reference. This style of titling would later be used by Cowboy Bebop.

Mechanical designer Shinji Aramaki came up with the transformable motorcycle-powered exoskeleton design while working on the Diaclone series (which later became part of Transformers). When riding his Honda VT250 250 cc motorbike, he thought to himself that it was the right size for a person to wear. Aramaki mentioned that the idea came to him because of his love for riding motorcycles when he was young.

The bike design was inspired by the Suzuki Katana. The black-and-white stripes on the Legioss and VR ride armor are a tribute to the Allied invasion stripes in World War II.

The series was released in North America by ADV Films with the original Japanese language and English subtitles on June 17, 2003.

Crunchyroll licenses the series.

== Adaptation for the Robotech series ==
Most of MOSPEADA's animation (with edited content and revised dialogue) was adapted for American audiences as Robotech: The New Generation, the third saga of the Robotech compilation series. In Robotech, the Inbit became the "Invid" of the "Third Generation" (also featured in Robotech II: The Sentinels) and the advanced space forces are the returning Robotech Expeditionary Force (REF) that left before the "Second Generation" of Robotech on Earth. Earth's Defense Forces were decimated in the previous saga. Unlike the Invid in the adapted Robotech, the Inbit in MOSPEADA had nothing to do with the Robotech Masters (their sworn enemies in Robotech) and they were just looking for a good planet on which to evolve and reach perfection. Likewise, the REF forces under Admiral Hunter's command that Barnard frequently referred to were troops from the Mars and Jupiter bases which harassed the Invid, though they were playing a "leave alone" system with humans on Earth.

The show's transformable mecha were also renamed; the Armor Cycles as Veritech Cyclones motorcycles; the AFC-01 Legioss became the VF/A-6 Alpha Veritech; the AB-01 Tlead became the VFB-9 Beta Veritech. Like Macross and Super Dimension Cavalry Southern Cross, Genesis Climber MOSPEADA was cut and fitted to be part of the Robotech continuum by Harmony Gold and Carl Macek.

Character names were generally altered without major changes in characterization, making MOSPEADA the least altered series of the three. Incidentally, it is also the series that has seen the most usage in the expanded universe of Robotech II: The Sentinels and Robotech: The Shadow Chronicles, especially in terms of character, mecha, and ship designs, as it was chronologically the last series used in Robotech. Unlike Macross, which is owned by Big West, Harmony Gold is free to utilize elements from the Tatsunoko-owned MOSPEADA.

=== Love Live Alive ===
After the original run of the television series, an OVA music video titled Genesis Climber MOSPEADA: Love Live Alive was released in Japan in September 1985. The music video consisted of both old and new footage. The story of Love Live Alive chronicled the events after the ending of MOSPEADA, featuring Yellow Belmont as the main character.

The music video focused on Yellow's concert and his flashbacks of past events. In 2013, it was adapted by Harmony Gold into Robotech: Love Live Alive. Some DVD releases of the Robotech version of Love Live Alive also include the original Japanese version as bonus content.

== Reception ==
Anime News Network wrote: "Mospeada is a work very much of its time, riffing on ideas and tropes that were all the rage when it was made, and doesn't do anything exceptional with them."

== See also ==
- Doraemon: Nobita and the Steel Troops: An anime film of the story of invasion by mechanical lifeforms – aired in 1986
- Kiteretsu Daihyakka: An anime in which the protagonist is good at crafts, and the settings of the six main characters are the same
- Robotech: Invasion, a video game based on the third Robotech storyline arc which was adapted from MOSPEADA
