= Rebecca Forstadt =

American voice actress

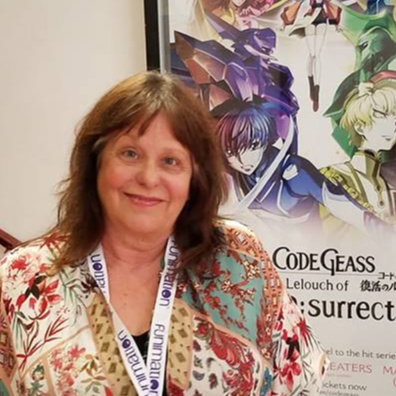
- At the Code Geass: Lelouch of the Re;surrection premiere
- Other name: Reba West
- Occupation: Voice actress
- Years active: 1980–present
- Spouse: Roger Olkowski (wid.)
- Children: 2
- Website: rebeccaforstadt.com

Rebecca Forstadt is an American voice actress, best known for playing young female roles in various animated series.

== Biography ==
After studying theater at Orange Coast College, in Costa Mesa, California, Forstadt began her acting career by working at Knott's Berry Farm's Bird Cage Theater, performing melodramas, often as the damsel in distress character.

Later, she went to Hollywood where she worked as a wardrobe mistress on such television shows as The White Shadow and Hill Street Blues, as well as for the film S.O.B.. She also spent several years doing live theater in the Los Angeles area.

Most notably, she won some recognition for her portrayal of the character Josette in the world premiere of Eugène Ionesco's Tales for People Under 3 Years of Age at the Stages Theatre Center in 1982. She starred in several low-budget movies such as Mugsy's Girls, with Ruth Gordon and Laura Branigan, and Round Numbers with Kate Mulgrew, Samantha Eggar, and Shani Wallis. Forstadt also appeared as a television actress in Hill Street Blues, St. Elsewhere, and L.A. Law

Her voice acting breakthrough came when she landed the leading role of Lynn Minmei in the English version of Robotech, the popular anime series of the 1980s. Since then, Forstadt has voiced hundreds of other anime characters like Nunnally Lamperouge in Code Geass, Rika Furude in When They Cry, Monomi from Danganronpa 2 Goodbye Despair, and Tima from Metropolis and has branched into non-anime cartoons, live-action shows (such as Masked Rider and Power Rangers: Time Force), commercials and radio work, and has performed background voices for movies such as Antz, Dr. Dolittle, and The Santa Clause.

In 2008, she was interviewed for the documentary movie Adventures in Voice Acting.

== Voice roles ==
=== Anime ===
- 3×3 Eyes – Pai Ayanokoji (Streamline dub)
- Aesop's Fables – Additional Voices
- The Swiss Family Robinson: Flone of the Mysterious Island – Rebecca "Becca" Robinson
- Ai Tenchi Muyo! - Mihoshi
- Akira – Additional Voices (Animaze dub)
- Armitage: Dual Matrix – Yoko
- Around the World with Willy Fog – Princess Romy
- Back to the Forest – Peter
- Battle Athletes – Young Akari Kanzaki, Child, Student
- Battle Athletes Victory – Elaine Reshpigi
- Blood: The Last Vampire – Sharon
- Bottle Fairy – Tamachan
- Carried by the Wind: Tsukikage Ran – Gin, Sayo Takakagi
- Code Geass – Nunnally Lamperouge, Miya I. Hillminck
- Cowboy Bebop – Boy Witness, Muriel
- Demetan Croaker, The Boy Frog – Various
- Destiny of the Shrine Maiden – Corona
- Detatoko Princess – Annie
- Devadasy – Amala
- Digimon Tamers – Ai
- Dragon Ball: Curse of the Blood Rubies – Penny (Harmony Gold dub)
- Dragon Ball: Mystical Adventure – Chaozu/Chiaotzu (Harmony Gold dub)
- Dogtanian and the Three Muskehounds – Juliette
- Eiken – Komoe Harumachi, Kyoko Morooka
- Elves of the Forest - Patty
- Fighting Fantasy Girl Rescue Me: Mave-chan – Fern 2
- Fushigi Yūgi Eikoden – Chosei
- Gate Keepers 21 – Ayane Isuzu (as Riva West)
- Ghost in the Shell: Stand Alone Complex – Tachikoma (Batou's Tachikoma)
- Grimm's Fairy Tale Classics – Various Roles
- Hanaukyo Maid Team: La Verite – Lemon
- Hand Maid May – Cyberdoll Rena
- Higurashi: When They Cry – Rika Furude
- Honeybee Hutch – Additional Voices
- Kaze no Yojimbo – Miyuki Tanokura
- Kikaider – Girl with Cat (Ep. 4)
- Kyo Kara Maoh! – Greta
- Little Women – Amy March
- A Little Snow Fairy Sugar – Sugar
- Love Hina – Little Girl (as Reba West)
- Lucky Star – Kanata Izumi, Hikage Miyakawa
- Lupin III: Part II – Alice Henderson (Ep. 27)
- Magic Knight Rayearth – Primera
- Magical Princess Minky Momo – Momo
- Mahoromatic – Chizuko Oe (most of "Something More Beautiful", replacing Melissa Fahn from Episode 1–4, and 12–14)
- Maple Town – Patty Rabbit
- Metropolis – Tima
- Mobile Suit Gundam: The Movie Trilogy – Kika
- Noozles – Additional Voices
- Outlaw Star – Iris, Hanmyo
- Planet Busters – Child
- Please Twins! – Kaede Misumi
- Pretty Sammy – Mihoshi Mizutani, Chihiro Kawai (Eps. 2–3)
- Robotech – Lynn Minmei (as Reba West)
- Robotech II: The Sentinels – Lynn Minmei (as Reba West)
- Rozen Maiden – Suiseiseki
- Rurouni Kenshin – Marimo Ebisu
- Saint Tail – Mari, Mayu, Shoko, Saori
- Samurai Girl Real Bout High School – Miyuki Onizuka (as Reba West)
- Space Pirate Captain Harlock – Maia Devlin
- Samurai X – Kori Kamiya (Kaoru Kamiya)
- Spartakus and the Sun Beneath the Sea – Rebecca
- Tenchi Muyo! series – Mihoshi Kuramitsu (Magical Girl Pretty Sammy OVA's 2 and 3, Tenchi in Tokyo, Tenchi the Movie 2: The Daughter of Darkness, Tenchi Forever! The Movie, Tenchi Muyo! Ryo-Ohki season 3, Tenchi Muyo! GXP), Ayeka Masaki Jurai (GXP), Erma (GXP)
- Trigun – Elizabeth (Child, Ep. 6)
- Ultra Maniac – Pine
- Vampire Princess Miyu – Morishita, Yuki
- Wild Arms: Twilight Venom – Nieza
- The World of the Talisman – Little Girl
- Zatch Bell! – Rushka (Eps. 40–41)
- Wowser- Linda Lovely

=== Live action ===
- Adventures in Voice Acting – Herself
- Delta Pi – Karen
- Hallo Spencer – Peggy (voice)
- Hill Street Blues – Girl Onlooker
- L.A. Law – Waitress
- Masked Rider – Ocusect (voice)
- Mighty Morphin Power Rangers – Fighting Flea, Miss Chief (uncredited)
- Power Rangers: Time Force – Computer Voice
- Power Rangers: Wild Force – Newscaster (uncredited)
- Round Numbers – Receptionist
- St. Elsewhere – Nurse Lucy
- Weather Girl – Kiyomi Ito (voice)

=== Non-anime ===
- Hey Arnold! – Cindy/Show Spokeswoman
- The Little Polar Bear – Anna
- The Mr. Men Show – Little Miss Giggles (credited as "Reba West")
- The Return of Dogtanian – Juliette
- Willy Fog 2 – Princess Romy
- Puppy in My Pocket: Adventures in Pocketville- Eva

=== Video games ===
- .hack – Additional Voices
- Ghost in the Shell: Stand Alone Complex – Tachikoma
- The Granstream Saga – Arcia (as Reba West)
- Robotech: Battlecry – Lynn Minmei, Izzy Randal
- Danganronpa 2: Goodbye Despair - Monomi/Usami
- Danganronpa 2×2 - Monomi

=== Theme Song Performance ===
- Magical Princess Minky Momo
- Robotech

== Production credits ==
=== Script Adaptation ===
- Argento Soma
- Digimon: Digital Monsters
- Kurogane Communication
- Nightwalker: The Midnight Detective
- Samurai Girl Real Bout High School (as Rebecca Olkowski)
- Samurai X
- Wild Arms: Twilight Venom

=== ADR/Looping ===
- Antz
- Dr. Dolittle
- The Santa Clause
