= Jack McKinney (writer) =

American novelist

Jack McKinney was a pseudonym used by American authors James Luceno and Brian Daley before the latter's death.

As well as adapting Robotech into novel form, they were also responsible for the Sentinels series which continued to expand the Robotech Universe. They also wrote the Black Hole Travel Agency series. Robotech: The End of the Circle (1990) is the final Robotech novel co-written by both before Brian Daley's death.)

== Published works ==
Year	Title
1987	Robotech: Genesis
1987	Robotech: Battle Cry
1987	Robotech: Homecoming
1987	Robotech: Battlehymn
1987	Robotech: Force of Arms
1987	Robotech: Doomsday
1987	Robotech: Southern Cross
1987	Robotech: Metal Fire
1987	Robotech: The Final Nightmare
1987	Robotech: Invid Invasion
1987	Robotech: Metamorphosis
1987	Robotech: Symphony of Light
1988	Robotech: The Sentinels: The Devil's Hand
1988	Robotech: The Sentinels: Dark Powers
1988	Robotech: The Sentinels: Death Dance
1988	Robotech: The Sentinels: World Killers
1988	Robotech: The Sentinels: Rubicon
1990	Kaduna Memories
1990	Robotech: The End of the Circle
1991	The Black Hole Travel Agency: Event Horizon
1991	The Black Hole Travel Agency: Artifact of the System
1992	The Black Hole Travel Agency: Free Radicals
1994	The Black Hole Travel Agency: Hostile Takeover
1994	Robotech: The Zentraedi Rebellion
1995	Robotech: The Masters' Gambit
1996	Robotech: Before the Invid Storm
1998	Robotech: Point of Departure
2007	Robotech: The New Generation: The Invid Invasion
