= Robotech (disambiguation) =

Robotech is a shortened version of robotechnology, in context of a science fiction media franchise that includes:

- Robotech (TV series), the 1985 animated television series that debuted in North America
- Robotech: The Movie, the 1986 Cannon film that was shelved after poor test screenings
- Robotech art books, published by Starblaze Graphics and Stonebridge Press
- Robotech Collectible Card Game, published by Hero Factory
- Robotech comics, from various publishers ranging from Comico to DC Comics
- Robotech music, created by Ulpio Minucci and other composers
- Robotech (novels), written by Jack McKinney
- Robotech (role-playing game), first published by Palladium Books in 1986
- Robotech live-action film, see Robotech#Proposed live-action film
