= Robotech music =

Music of the Robotech media franchise

Robotech music consists of the musical scores written for the original 1985 Robotech television series and its various sequels and spinoffs, including Robotech video games. The recognizable original themes were composed by Ulpio Minucci and orchestrated by Arlon Ober. Other composers include:

- Michael Bradley
- Julian Costas (Composer/Singer) aka Claudio Costa (NAS/SGA Award Winning Composer)
- Scott Glasgow
- Jack Goga
- Jesper Kyd
- Randall Rumage
- Steve Wittmack
- Marcia Woods
- Alberto Estevez

== Soundtrack releases ==
=== Music of the TV Series "Robotech" ===
Released only in France as "Musique Originale De La Serié T.V. "Robotech"" (translated from French to "Original Music of the T.V. Series "Robotech"") for the French broadcast of the Robotech TV series.

=== Robotech: BGM Collection, Vol.1 ===
Robotech: BGM Collection, Vol.1

Soundtrack album
- Released: 1987
- Length: 37:02
- Label: U.S. Renditions
- Producers: Thomas A. White; Mchael Bradley; Steve Wittmack

This vinyl record from U.S. Renditions was the only LP release of the Robotech soundtrack in North America. The track selection represented only a small portion of the Robotech musical score from the original television series since additional volumes were never released. This album was the first domestic anime product of U.S. Renditions as well as the first ever American anime BGM album. The album was produced by David Keith Riddick who was a founding member of U.S. Renditions.

Track Listing

Side A
1. Robotech Main Title
2. Mechastorm
3. Flower of Life
4. Enemy Attack
5. Love Theme I
6. We Will Win
7. Robotechnology Theme
8. Love Theme II
9. Rick Hunter Theme
10. Roy Fokker Theme
11. Earth Government at Work
12. Lonely Soldier Boy
13. Macross Theme
Side B
1. Red Alert
2. The Way to Love
3. Together
4. Sentinels Medley (Robotech Defense Force Anthem, RDF Action Theme, The New Mission, Invid Attack on Tirol, Rick and Lisa Love Theme, The Sentinels)

=== Robotech: Perfect Collection ===
Robotech: Perfect Collection

Soundtrack album
- Released: 1989
- Label: U.S. Renditions
- Producers: Thomas A. White; Mchael Bradley; Steve Wittmack

This single CD from U.S. Renditions was the first digital release of the Robotech soundtrack. This was the first American anime BGM (Background Music) soundtrack to be released in the Compact Disc format. This release included tracks that were missing from the earlier vinyl album release. Due to budgetary constraints, the track selection remained incomplete.

Track Listing

1. Robotech Main Title
2. Mechastorm
3. Flower of Life
4. Enemy Attack
5. Love Theme I
6. We Will Win
7. Robotechnology Theme
8. Love Theme II
9. Rick Hunter Theme
10. Roy Fokker Theme
11. Earth Government at Work
12. Lonely Soldier Boy
13. Macross Theme
14. RoboBumper
15. Red Alert
16. The Way to Love
17. Together
18. The Sentinels Medley
19. My Time to be a Star*
20. We Will Win (Minmei Extended Version)*
21. It's You*
22. Look Up (The Sky is Falling)*
23. We Will Win (Lancer version)*

(asterisk indicates bonus track)

=== Robotech: The Movie Soundtrack ===
Robotech: The Movie

Soundtrack album
- Released: 1987
- Recorded: 1985, 1986
- Length: 34:11
- Labels: Carrere/Dessca (France); MH/Sicameria Sacifi (Argentina)
- Producers: Thomas A. White; Mchael Bradley; Steve Wittmack

Released only in France and Latin America as "Bande Originale Du Film Robotech" (translated from French to "Robotech: The Movie Original Soundtrack") for the rarely seen Robotech: The Movie, the various records, cassettes, and discs of this soundtrack are now considered collector's items. Michael Bradley's single of Robotech The Movie: Underground was also released separately by Carrere Records.

Track Listing

Side A
1. Underground (Radio Version)
2. In My Heart
3. Robotech – Main Title (Short Version)
4. The Future Is Now
5. Shinin' On Top Of A Star
Side B
1. Call On Me
2. Robotech – Main Title (Long Version)
3. Only A Fool
4. Saved By Science

=== Robotech: Perfect Soundtrack Album ===
Robotech: Perfect Soundtrack Album (10th Anniversary Edition)

Soundtrack album
- Released: 1996
- Length: 2:26:03
- Label: Streamline Pictures
- Producers: Thomas A. White; Mchael Bradley; Steve Wittmack

This double CD set from Streamline Pictures is also known as the Tenth Anniversary Soundtrack and represented the first attempt to digitally restore up the music and gather as many tracks as possible from the original television series into a single collection along with some additional tracks from Robotech: The Movie and Robotech II: The Sentinels.

Track Listing

Disc 1
1. Main Title
2. Macross City
3. The Mysterious Ship
4. Zentraedi Theme
5. Confrontation
6. Musica's Theme
7. The Way To Love
8. Boobytrap
9. Biomechanical Theme
10. Ineptitude
11. Love Themes
12. Miss Macross
13. Stepping Out
14. Victory
15. SDF-1 Theme
16. Battle Stations
17. The 15th Squadron
18. Desolation
19. The Robotech Masters
20. Broken Heart
21. Private Time
22. Earth Government Theme
23. Eyecatch
24. Minmei's Theme
25. Sweet Sixteen
26. Lifeline
27. Rick Hunter's Theme
28. The Robotech Follies
29. Earth Government Debriefing
30. Khyron's Theme
31. Roy Fokker's Theme
32. Alien Attack
33. Reconstruction Blues
34. It's You
35. A New Dawn
36. Invid Theme
37. Cyclone
38. Catastrophe
39. We Will Win
40. Love Triangle
41. Mission Accomplished
42. End Title
Disc 2
1. My Time To Be A Star – Reba West
2. The Man In My Life – Reba West
3. To Be In Love – Reba West
4. It's You – Reba West
5. We Will Win – Reba West
6. In My Heart – Three Dog Night
7. Underground – Michael Bradley And Joanne Harris
8. Saved By Science – Joanne Harris
9. Only A Fool – Gigi Agrama
10. Call On Me – Joanne Harris
11. The Future Is Now – Joanne Harris
12. Together – Sunny Hilden
13. Look Up! – Michael Bradley
14. It Don't Get Any Better – Michael Bradley
15. Lonely Soldier Boy – Michael Bradley
16. The Way To Love – Michael Bradley
17. We Will Win – Michael Bradley
18. The REF March
19. The Young Warriors
20. The SDF-3
21. Invid Strike
22. The Regent
23. Love Theme
24. The Sentinels

=== Robotech: Battlecry Soundtrack ===
Robotech: Battlecry

Soundtrack album by Barry Fasman and John O'Kennedy
- Released: September 23, 2002
- Label: TDK Mediactive
- Producer: TDK Mediactive

This CD from TDK Mediactive featured music from the Robotech: Battlecry video game that drew on Ulpio Minucci and Arlon Ober's original themes, but was limited to playback from synthesized instruments. It was bundled as part of special edition box sets of the game.

Track Listing

1. Robotech Main Theme: Battlecry Remix
2. Countdown (inspired by the Alien Attack)
3. Force of Arms
4. Bursting Point
5. Dark Skies (inspired by Battle Stations)
6. Destroids in Danger
7. Boobytrap
8. Ambush Hills (inspired by Roy Fokker'sTheme)
9. Rebel Revenge
10. Call to Arms
11. Hostage Crisis (inspired by Rick Hunter's Theme)
12. Trial by Fire
13. Daring Rescue
14. Graveyard (inspired by the SDF-1 Theme)
15. Warpath
16. Lightning Strike
17. Showdown (inspired by the Zentraedi Theme)
18. Welcome to Zen City
19. To the Death

=== Robotech: Invasion Soundtrack ===
Robotech: Invasion

Soundtrack album by Jesper Kyd
- Released: February 15, 2005
- Genres: Electronica; Choral; Classical
- Length: 57:42
- Label: Sumthing Else Music Works
- Producer: Take-Two Interactive

Jesper Kyd chronology
Splinter Cell: Chaos Theory (2005)	Robotech: Invasion (2005)	Hitman: Codename 47 / Hitman 2: Silent Assassin (2005)

This CD from Sumthing Else Music Works was composed by notable game composer Jesper Kyd for the Robotech: Invasion video game, but featured music that was very different in style and tone from previous Robotech music.

Kyd's thinking on the score:

I had seen Robotech in the 80's and remembered the awesome storyline and visuals. I was asked to write a completely new score for Robotech: Invasion and NOT use the original 1980s music as an inspiration. So while I did watch quite a bit of Robotech to get familiar with the franchise again, I didn't pay too much attention to the TV show soundtrack. I read a lot of Robotech comics, especially the Robotech: Invasion series, because of the close relations these comic books had with the game.

for Robotech: Invasion I was asked to create a new sound that was far removed from the previous titles, so I produced a modern, high-tech electronic score mixed with a large choir. It was a great experience composing for an epic, sci-fi setting.

Track Listing

1. Introduction (0:29)
2. Main Title (5:28)
3. Inside (4:46)
4. Final Moments (5:23)
5. Hymn of the Wasteland (5:04)
6. Approaching Invid Hive (4:10)
7. Invid Hive (4:56)
8. Wide Planes (4:47)
9. Stealth Beats (5:08)
10. The Invid Attacks (3:54)
11. Boss Attack (5:25)
12. Time Out (3:24)
13. Night Time in the Forest (4:48)

=== Robotech: 20th Anniversary Soundtrack ===
Robotech: The Original Soundtrack (20th Anniversary Edition)

Soundtrack album by Ulpio Minucci, Arlon Ober, Michael Bradley and Steve Wittmack
- Released: 2005, 2006
- Length: 2:37:46
- Label: Harmony Gold Music
- Producer: Harmony Gold USA

Released at the end of 2005, this double CD set from Harmony Gold USA is also known as the Twentieth Anniversary Soundtrack. Some of the music was cleaned up further over the previous tenth anniversary release and includes 7 more tracks than before. A variant was released in summer 2006 in which a stereo effect was simulated on tracks that were originally recorded in mono.

Track Listing

Disc 1
1. Main Title (1:33) Ulpio Minucci
2. Macross City (1:32) Ulpio Minucci
3. The Mysterious Ship (1:25) Ulpio Minucci & Arlon Ober
4. The Zentraedi (1:37) Arlon Ober
5. Confrontation (1:08) Ulpio Minucci & Arlon Ober
6. Musica's Theme (2:44) Arlon Ober
7. The Way To Love (1:55) Ulpio Minucci & Marcia Woods
8. Boobytrap (2:58) Arlon Ober
9. Robotechnology (0:41) Arlon Ober
10. Ineptitude (1:17) Arlon Ober
11. Love Themes (2:11) Ulpio Minucci & Arlon Ober
12. Miss Macross (1:04) Ulpio Minucci & Arlon Ober
13. Stepping Out (2:04) Arlon Ober
14. Victory (1:34) Arlon Ober
15. SDF-1 Theme (1:13) Arlon Ober
16. Battle Stations (2:28) Arlon Ober
17. The 15th Squadron (2:03) Arlon Ober
18. Desolation (2:45) Arlon Ober
19. The Robotech Masters (2:43) Ulpio Minucci & Arlon Ober
20. Broken Heart (1:58) Ulpio Minucci & Arlon Ober
21. Private Time (2:03) Arlon Ober
22. The United Earth Government (0:48) Arlon Ober
23. Reflections *
24. Eyecatch (0:08) Ulpio Minucci
25. Minmei's Theme (2:02) Arlon Ober
26. The Cosmic Harp *
27. Sweet Sixteen (1:23) Ulpio Minucci & Arlon Ober
28. Lifeline (3:22) Ulpio Minucci & Arlon Ober
29. Rick Hunter's Theme (1:37) Alberto Estevez
30. The Robotech Follies (1:53) Arlon Ober
31. Earth Government Debriefing (1:40) Arlon Ober
32. Khyron's Theme (1:34) Ulpio Minucci, Arlon Ober & Alberto Estevez
33. The Hive*
34. Roy Fokker's Theme (2:16) Arlon Ober
35. Enemy Attack (1:23) Ulpio Minucci & Arlon Ober
36. Reconstruction Blues (0:45) Arlon Ober
37. Hard Times*
38. It's You (2:04) Ulpio Minucci & Marcia Woods
39. A New Dawn (0:47) Arlon Ober
40. Invid Theme (2:50) Ulpio Minucci, Arlon Ober, Michael Bradley & Steve Wittmack
41. Cyclone (1:03) Alberto Estevez
42. Catastrophe (1:33) Arlon Ober
43. We Will Win (2:08) Ulpio Minucci & Marcia Woods
44. Love Triangle (1:47) Ulpio Minucci & Arlon Ober
45. Mission Accomplished (1:09) Arlon Ober
46. End Title (0:43) Ulpio Minucci
Disc 2
1. My Time To Be A Star (1:02) Performed by Reba West
2. The Man In My Life (1:23) Performed by Reba West
3. To Be In Love (1:45) Performed by Reba West
4. It's You (2:14) Performed by Reba West
5. The Right Move* Performed by Reba West
6. We Will Win (4:01) Performed by Reba West
7. Lifeline* Performed by Joanne Harris
8. In My Heart (4:24) Performed by Three Dog Night
9. Underground (4:27) Performed by Michael Bradley & Joanne Harris
10. Saved By Science (4:41) Performed by Joanne Harris
11. Only A Fool (3:31) Performed by Gigi Agrama
12. Call On Me (5:20) Performed by Joanne Harris
13. The Future Is Now (3:37) Performed by Joanne Harris
14. Together (3:10) Performed by Sunny Hilden
15. The Flower of Life* Performed by Joanne Harris
16. Look Up! The Sky Is Falling (4:53) Performed by Michael Bradley
17. It Don't Get Any Better (3:46) Performed by Michael Bradley
18. Lonely Soldier Boy (4:17) Performed by Michael Bradley
19. The Way To Love (1:59) Performed by Michael Bradley
20. We Will Win (2:32) Performed by Michael Bradley
21. The REF March (2:15)
22. The Young Warriors (2:36)
23. The SDF-3 (1:28)
24. Invid Strike (2:09)
25. The Regent (2:35)
26. Love Theme (3:09)
27. The Sentinels (1:58)

(asterisk indicates newly added tracks)

=== Robotech: The Shadow Chronicles Soundtrack ===
Robotech: The Shadow Chronicles

Soundtrack album by Scott Glasgow
- Released: February 13, 2007
- Genre: Soundtrack
- Length: 67:11
- Label: Varèse Sarabande
- Producer: Harmony Gold USA

Completed in 2006, composer Scott Glasgow recorded the music for the Robotech: The Shadow Chronicles movie with the Prague Symphony Orchestra, utilizing some of the original theme music by Ulpio Minucci. A CD soundtrack was released by Varèse Sarabande on February 13, 2007.

Track Listing

1. Main Title (original theme by Ulpio Minucci) (1:56)
2. Race You Back! (1:38)
3. War Room (2:51)
4. The Icarus (1:57)
5. Legacy of War (2:24)
6. The Battle Begins (3:23)
7. Scott Bernard (2:47)
8. The Regess (2:00)
9. The Nichols Maneuver (2:35)
10. The SDF-3 (1:48)
11. Battle of Reflex Point (3:04)
12. Exodus (2:51)
13. The Awareness (1:15)
14. Omicron Sector (1:45)
15. Ariel (Love Theme) (2:25)
16. Maia Sterling (1:49)
17. Lunar Battle (1:53)
18. Moonbase ALuCE (1:57)
19. Janice in the Lab (3:11)
20. Children of the Shadow (1:49)
21. Command Center (3:03)
22. Sacrifice (3:49)
23. The Hybrid (1:45)
24. The Ark Angel (1:52)
25. Infiltration (2:07)
26. Dogfight (2:09)
27. Space Station Liberty (3:42)
28. Resolutions (3:26)

=== Robotech: 30th Anniversary Soundtrack ===
Robotech: The Original Soundtrack (30th Anniversary Edition)

Soundtrack album by Ulpio Minucci, Arlon Ober, Michael Bradley and Steve Wittmack
- Released: 2015
- Length: 3:18:53
- Label: Harmony Gold Music
- Producer: Harmony Gold USA

Track Listing

Disc 1: Series Instrumental Collection
1. Robotech Theme
2. Crashing Metal
3. Zentraedi Theme
4. The Mysterious Ship
5. Macross Anthem (Instrumental Version)
6. Suspense
7. Confrontation
8. Musica's Theme
9. The Way To Love (Piano Version)
10. Boobytrap
11. Intrigue
12. Biomechanical
13. Ineptitude
14. Robotech Love Themes
15. Miss Macross ("My Time To Be A Star" Instrumental Version)
16. Stepping Out
17. Victory
18. The SDF-1
19. Battlestations
20. Red Alert
21. The 15th Squadron
22. Intruder
23. Desolation
24. The Robotech Masters
25. The Point Of No Return
26. Daydream
27. Broken Heart
28. Private Time Themes
29. United Earth Government Theme
30. Reflections
31. Shocked
32. Cliffhangers
33. Eyecatch
34. Escalations
35. Lifeline
36. Rick Hunter's Theme
37. Minmei's Theme
38. Bliss Themes
39. The Cosmic Harp
40. Sweet Sixteen ("The Man In My Life" Instrumental Version)
41. Robotech Follies
42. Imbeciles
43. Earth Government At Work
44. Earth Government Debriefing
45. Khyron's Theme
46. The Hive
47. Roy Fokker's Theme
48. Liftoff
49. Alien Attack
50. Reconstruction Blues
51. Hard Times
52. It's You (Piano Version)
53. A New Dawn
54. Invid Theme ("The Flower Of Life" Instrumental Theme)
55. Across The Universe
56. Cyclone Theme
57. Showdown
58. Catastrophe
59. We Will Win (Piano Version)
60. Love Triangle ("To Be In Love" Piano Version)
61. Mission Accomplished
62. Robotech End Title
Disc 2: Series Vocal Music Collection
1. Macross Anthem
2. Drumsticks
3. My Time To Be A Star (Reba West)
4. The Man In My Life (Reba West)
5. To Be In Love (Reba West)
6. It's You (Reba West)
7. The Right Move (Reba West)
8. We Will Win (Minmei Version) (Reba West)
9. "Take One"
10. The Way To Love (Minmei Version) (Reba West)
11. It's You (George Sullivan Version) (Kent Harrison Hayes)
12. Lifeline (Joanne Harris)
13. The Flower Of Life (Joanne Harris)
14. Look Up! The Sky Is Falling (Michael Bradley)
15. It Don't Get Any Better (Michael Bradley)
16. Lonely Soldier Boy (Michael Bradley)
17. We Will Win (Yellow Dancer Version) (Michael Bradley)
18. The Way To Love (Yellow Dancer Version) (Michael Bradley)
19. "Take Two"
20. We Will Win (Extended Minmei Version) (Reba West)
21. "Yeah!"
Disc 3: Sequel Music Collection
1. Robotech Theme (Enhanced Version)
2. The Young Warriors
3. Reprimand
4. Incoming
5. Hellcats
6. Subterfuge
7. Into The Unknown
8. The SDF-3
9. Expeditionary Debriefing
10. The REF March
11. Crisis
12. Procession Of The Invid
13. Rocket Science
14. Black Magic
15. Dissension
16. Expeditionary Love Theme
17. A Penny For Your Thoughts
18. The Raid
19. At The Altar
20. Together (Instrumental Version)
21. The Regent
22. Training Day
23. Expeditionary Follies
24. Rise Of The Warriors
25. The Mystery Of Protoculture
26. The Sentinels
27. Deep Space Swagger
28. The Warrior's Journey
29. Robotech Main Theme ("Love Live Alive" Version) (Scott Glasgow)
30. Zentraedi Theme ("Love Live Alive" Version) (Scott Glasgow)
31. Only A Fool ("Robotech: The Untold Story" & "Love Live Alive") (Gigi Agrama)
32. Shinin' On Top Of A Star ("Robotech: The Untold Story") (Randall Rumage)
33. Together ("Robotech II: The Sentinels") (Sunny Hilden)
