= Robotech (comics) =

- The first Robotech comic book, Robotech Defenders #1, published by DC Comics in January, 1985.

Publication information
- Publisher: DC Comics; Comico Comics; Eternity Comics; Academy Comics; Antarctic Press; WildStorm Productions; Titan Comics
- Schedule: Monthly
- Format: Ongoing series
- Genre: Science fiction

Robotech comics first officially appeared in print in 1985, though Comico published the first issue of its license from Harmony Gold USA under the Macross name.

When Harmony Gold was releasing the first few episodes of its original Macross dub in 1984, it was discovered that Revell already had a Robotech Defenders line of scale model kits that included the transformable Macross mecha. The potential for brand confusion caused concern that Harmony Gold would have problems selling its own transformable Macross toys. Harmony Gold and Revell were able to come to a co-licensing agreement — when producer Carl Macek had the idea to combine Macross with Southern Cross and Mospeada to create an 85-episode television series, he chose to use Revell's pre-existing Robotech name and logo to strengthen the title's brand recognition.

== Publication history ==
=== DC Comics (1984) ===
A little-known Robotech Defenders limited comic book series was first published by DC Comics in 1984. Based on the Revell line of plastic models, this series actually combines mecha designs from Macross, Orguss, and Dougram. It predates the television series by about a year. The comic was originally intended to be a three-issue limited series; however, due to poor sales (and reportedly, pressure from Harmony Gold to "clear the way" for the TV series), the series was truncated down to only two issues.

- Robotech Defenders (no connection to the television series)

=== Revell (1984) ===
Revell's division in West Germany, Revell Plastic, GmbH, published a one-shot promotional issue of Robotech Defenders with a subtitle translating to "The Defenders of the Cosmos." Written by W. Spiegel with artwork by Walter Neugebauer, this original comic was not a reprint of the DC Comics series and was not connected to its continuity. Like the DC Comics series, it also had no connection to the TV series.

- Robotech Defenders: Die Verteidiger des Kosmos (no connection to the television series)

=== Comico (1985–1989) ===
Robotech: The Graphic Novel

Comico's Robotech comics consisted almost entirely of adaptations of the Robotech TV episodes, released alongside or just after their TV airings. Rather than releasing them sequentially, they released all three series at once. Of the 85 TV episodes, only "Dana's Story" was not directly adapted; it was later re-published in an expanded graphic novel. The main reason for this was not to provide spoilers for the outcome of The Macross Saga. While each issue adapted one episode, most issues made small changes to the dialogue and sometimes inconsequential changes to the story itself. The final issue of The Macross Saga had an expanded ending that further set up the story of Robotech II: The Sentinels.

The Robotech Graphic Novel was not based on any TV episodes, but instead provided a backstory for some elements of the TV series. The events of the Graphic Novel also were depicted in the first Robotech novel, written by James Luceno and Brian Daley.

Though the Comico comic adaptations are no longer considered official continuity by Harmony Gold, the first 25 issues of The Macross Saga comic series, along with Robotech: The Graphic Novel, was reprinted in four trade paperback collections published by Wildstorm in 2002–2003.

- Robotech: The Macross Saga (1984–1989), #1–36
- Robotech Special (1988), #1 (extended version of "Dana's Story")
- Robotech Masters (1985–1988), #1–23
- Robotech: The New Generation (1985–1986), #1–25
- Robotech: The Graphic Novel (1986) (prequel)
- Robotech in 3-D (1987), #1 (a 3D adaptation of episode one of The Macross Saga television episode)

Comico did not get the license to adapt Robotech II: The Sentinels however at least one internal mock-up cover for a Sentinels comic was created. Comico's final issue pointed fans to Eternity's run of The Sentinels, which began 3 months prior.

=== Eternity (1988–1994) ===
Eternity Comics began publishing Robotech comics in 1988 with a license that only included The Sentinels series, which included direct adaptations of the scripts and novels as well as prequels and guide books that had The Sentinels branding in their title. In 1991 Eternity Comics' license with Harmony Gold expanded beyond The Sentinels, allowing for their titles to take place in any part of the Robotech timeline. Also, as the series progressed, the writers began deviating from the Sentinels novels, adding new story elements and new characters. For the entirety of the Eternity run, the artwork for the Sentinels adaptation was handled by Jason and John Waltrip.

When Malibu Comics was purchased by Marvel Comics, Eternity (a Malibu imprint) was closed. The Robotech comics license was acquired by Academy Comics, an independent publisher.

- Robotech II: The Sentinels
  - Book I (1988–1990), #1–16
  - Book II (1990–1993), #1–21
  - Book III (1993–1994), #1–8 (continued at Academy Comics)
- Robotech II: The Sentinels: The Malcontent Uprisings (1989–1990), #1–12
- Robotech II: The Sentinels: Cyberpirates (1991), #1–4
- Robotech II: The Sentinels: The Illustrated Handbook (1991), #1–3
- Robotech II: The Sentinels: Wedding Special (1989), #1–2
- Robotech II: The Sentinels: Swimsuit Spectacular (1992), #1
- Robotech Genesis: The Legend of Zor (1992), #1–6
- Robotech: Invid War (1992–1993), #1–18
- Robotech: Firewalkers (1993), #1 (story originally published in Captain Harlock: Fall of the Empire (1992) #1-4)
- Robotech: Invid War: Aftermath (1993–1994), #1–6 (continued at Academy Comics)
- Robotech: Return to Macross (1993–1994), #1–12 (continued at Academy Comics)

=== Academy (1994–1996) ===
Academy Comics acquired the Robotech license from Malibu, as well as Jason and John Waltrip and long-time Robotech comics writer Bill Spangler. Academy initially re-launched all of Eternity's then-current comic series, as well as several new lines. The Sentinels comic picked up directly from where Eternity had left off, with the Waltrips taking over the writing and art work.

While the academy Sentinels comics were well-received, thfhoe other comics suffered from often inconsistent writing and artwork—both Invid War: Aftermath and Clone were canceled prematurely after their respective writer/artists left the company. Despite these problems, the academy Robotech comics were often well received by fans.

In 1996, Harmony Gold abruptly revoked Academy's Robotech license, handing it to Antarctic Press. Academy folded shortly thereafter.

- Robotech II: The Sentinels
  - Book Three (1994–1995), #9–22 (continued from Eternity)
  - Book Four (1995–1996), #1–13
- Robotech II: The Sentinels Halloween Special (1996), #1
- Robotech II: The Sentinels: Star Runners: Carpenter's Journey (1995), #1
- Robotech: Return to Macross (1994–1996), #13–37 (continued from Eternity)
- Robotech: Invid War: Aftermath (1994–1995), #7–13 (continued from Eternity)
- Hohsq's Story: A Robotech Romance (1994), #1
- Robotech: Clone (1994–1995), #0–5 (continued for one issue as Robotech: Mordecai)
- Robotech: Clone (Youth Inertia) 40 Page Special Edition (1995), #1
- Robotech: Mordecai (1996), #1
- Robotech: Macross Missions
  - Destroid (1994), #1
  - Excalibur (1995), #1
  - Excalibur II (1996), #1
- Robotech: Academy Blues (1995–1996), #0–5
- Robotech: Mechangel (1995–1996), #0–3
- Robotech: Tempest (1995), #1
- Robotech: Metalswarm (1995), #1
- 1996 Robotech Comic Calendar (1995)
- Robotech: Boobytrap (1996), #1 (adaptation of the first episode)
- Robotech: The Movie (1996), #1–2 (adaptation)
- Robotech: The Misfits (1996), #1 (canceled after one issue)
- Robotech: The Warriors (1994–1995), #0–3
- Robotech: Romance (1996), #1–3
- Robotech: Breaking Point: Cadet Lisa Hayes Special (1996), #1
- Robotech: Civil War Stories (1996), #1
- Worlds of Robotech
  - Robotech: Cyber World - Secrets of Haydon IV (1994), #1
  - Robotech II: Invid World - Assault on Optera (1994), #1
  - Robotech: Amazon World - Escape from Praxis (1994), #1
  - Robotech: Smith World - Sabotage on Karbarra (1995), #1
  - The Sentinels Presents... Feral World - Nightmare on Garuda (1996), #1
  - The Sentinels Presents... Crystal World - Prisoners of Spheris (1996), #1

=== Antarctic Press (1997–1998) ===
These stories consisted chiefly of standalone side-stories and spinoffs featuring mostly the original Macross Saga characters. Most of the stories were strongly revisionist in nature, and sometimes involved established characters acting out-of-character, even occasionally to the point of camp. The stories featuring the Macross Saga also frequently used character and vehicle designs unique to the film Macross: Do You Remember Love?, which Harmony Gold did not have rights to license at the time. Because of Antarctic Press' decision not to enlist the talents of John and Jason Waltrip to finish The Sentinels (which, by the end of its academy run, was 80% complete, story-wise), many fans are highly critical of Antarctic's Robotech comics.

Most notably criticized was Sentinels: Rubicon, which theoretically picks up many years after the Sentinels story would have concluded. Those two issues bore no resemblance to any previous (or subsequent) Robotech material, and featured art that was virtually incomprehensible. Rubicon ended abruptly, two issues into a proposed seven-issue series, with many fans applauding the decision.

Antarctic's Robotech license was abruptly revoked in 1998, with no explanation offered.

- Robotech (1997–1998), #1–11 (featuring the "Megastorm," "Rolling Thunder," "Prototype 001," and "Introduction" story lines)
- Robotech Annual, #1 (1998)
- Robotech: Covert Ops (1998), #1–2
- Robotech: Crystal Dreams (1999), #1 (promotional video game tie-in given away at E3)
- Robotech: Vermillion (1997–1998), #1–4 (featuring the backup stories "Mospeada Diary" and "Unsung Heroes")
- Robotech: Wings of Gibraltar (1998), #1–2
- Robotech: Class Reunion (1998), #1
- Robotech: The Sentinels: Rubicon (1998), #1–2) (no discernible relation to the Jack McKinney novel)

Antarctic Press' first issue of Robotech in March 1997 advertised an upcoming series titled Robotech: Mospeada, which was never published.

=== Wildstorm (DC Comics) (2002-2010) ===
Robotech: From The Stars

In 2002, with the publication of the Wildstorm (DC) comics, Harmony Gold officially decided to reboot and retcon the Robotech universe.

Rather than running a continuing series with side stories as the previous holders of the Robotech comic license had done, Wildstorm instead ran several limited series. The last Wildstorm publication was the trade paperback of Robotech: Prelude to the Shadow Chronicles in 2010.

- Robotech: From The Stars

Covers the early years of Roy Fokker and the VF-1 development program before the launch of the SDF-1. Also features young Rick Hunter at the flying circus, the battle against the Anti-Unification League, and Roy's early dealings with Claudia, Jan Morris, and Colonel Edwards. Based on Robotech TV series continuity, and unrelated to Macross Zero. This comic series was criticized for its revisionist nature, diverging from the events previously described in the Jack McKinney novels, with a new account of the discovery and adaptation of the SDF-1 (Gloval is introduced as a Russian submarine captain), Robotechnology, and a redesigned version of Lt. Colonel T. R. Edwards. It presented yet another version of Roy Fokker on Macross Island before the launch of the SDF-1, like Comico's The Graphic Novel, Eternity and Academy's Return to Macross, and the anime Macross Zero.

- Robotech Sourcebook

A one-shot companion book that details the characters and mecha before the First Robotech War. Partially reprinted in the 2003 From The Stars trade paperback collection.

- Robotech: Love & War

Follows the relationship of Max & Miriya from a more backstory angle, including Max's early friendship with Ben on Macross Island before the launch of the SDF-1. Includes the companion story "Little White Dragon," about Minmei's first movie.

- Robotech: Invasion

Details Lancer's early adventures under the 10th Mars Division and expands his relationship with Carla. While not an adaptation of the 2004 video game, it covers the first REF attempt to liberate the Earth, and ends with the arrival of Scott Bernard and the 21st Mars Division. The side story "Mars Base 1" expands on the adventures of Lisa Hayes' first love, Karl Riber. Features a couple alternative covers by original Genesis Climber Mospeada character designer Yoshitaka Amano.

- Robotech: Prelude to the Shadow Chronicles

Written by Jason and John Waltrip, this series picks up with many elements from secondary sources such as the Sentinels novels and comics. While not an exact continuation of the Waltrips' previous comics, it is neither a total reimagining. Rather, it selectively retcons The Sentinels era to fit with the new "official" continuity, and provide a prelude to the Robotech: The Shadow Chronicles feature film. Initially closely spaced, the issues were released further apart when the release of The Shadow Chronicles was delayed. In this title, the Waltrips were able to incorporate their own previously planned ideas for The Sentinels prior to its cancellation, including turning the series' villain T.R. Edwards into a giant monster.

On April 1, 2006, the official Robotech website published a joke article soliciting a fictitious 12-issue series titled Robotech: Before the Prelude to The Shadow Chronicles with each issue featuring a tribute to the character Lynn Kyle and each issue being signed by Alan Smithee.

=== Dynamite/DC Comics (2013–2015) ===
In July 2013, Dynamite Entertainment announced at San Diego Comic-Con the future publication of a Robotech/Voltron crossover title, via a licensing agreement with DC, Harmony Gold, and World Events Productions. While more comics were planned, these concepts were cancelled when it became clear that DC Comics would not be renewing their license to the comics.

- Robotech/Voltron

A crossover between the Robotech TV series and the similar Voltron TV show. In the Voltron universe, the Voltron Force disappears during a battle and leaves the planet defenseless. In the Robotech universe (set during the episode Space Fold), Voltron appears outside of Earth and changes history, destroying the Zentradi fleet and killing Breetai and Exedore. The SDF-1 also disappears in a fold, and the Voltron ships crash land on Macross Island, all but the fifth lion, which goes missing. The two universes must find out what has caused this dimensional anomaly and set it right before it is too late.
In November 2015, Harmony Gold published on a one-page epilogue on their official Facebook page. This epilogue reveals the story to be entirely made up by characters of the Macross Saga, despite implying they would know how certain future events in the Robotech story play out. In February 2016 they published another one-page epilogue, this time still taking place within the series' main story.

=== Titan Comics (2017–present) ===
In June, 2016, Harmony Gold and Titan Comics announced a collaboration to release a new Robotech comic line in 2017. A cover was revealed in October, drawn by the Waltrip brothers.

- Robotech (2017–2019), #1–24 (Free Comic Book Day issue #0 taking place after issue #20, totaling 25 issues)

This series marks the very first time the Robotech story has been rebooted, offering significant changes to events and characters. Solicitations for issue #24, released on September 11, 2019, announced it as the "final issue."

- Robotech: Remix (2019–2020) #2.1–2.4

Following Event Horizon event of Robotech (2017), the comic continued with a new series Robotech: Remix. The fourth issue of Remix was released in January 2020, but despite planned additional issues, the effects of the COVID-19 pandemic on the direct market comics industries has delayed additional releases indefinitely.

- Robotech: Rick Hunter (2023–2024) #1–4

This series marks a return to Robotech's main timeline, abandoning the alternate timeline arc from Titan Comic's previous two Robotech titles. Taking place five years after The Macross Saga, this comic directly references story elements from the 2002 Robotech: Battlecry video game, as well as Eternity's Robotech II: The Sentinels: The Malcontent Uprisings comic series. The first issue was released at San Diego Comic-Con in July 2023 while the fourth and final issue was released in April 2024.
