= Graduation Exercise =

Graduation Exercise is a 1994 role-playing adventure for Prime Directive published by Task Force Games.

== Plot summary ==
Graduation Exercise is an adventure in which the player characters face encounters to test their intelligence and courage.

== Reception ==
Jason Fryer reviewed Graduation Exercise in White Wolf Inphobia #50 (Dec., 1994), rating it a 4 out of 5 and stated that "Graduation Exercise is a must for Prime Directive gamemasters. The screen should make your life much easier, and the package's adventure is a perfect way to start your campaign."

== Reviews ==
- Diary of the Doctor Who Role-Playing Games (Issue 2 - Sep 2010)
