= Jonathan M. Thompson =

American game designer (1971–2023)

- Born: November 16, 1971; Shreveport, Louisiana
- Died: February 19, 2023 (aged 51)
- Occupation: Writer
- Writing career
- Genre: Role-playing games

Jonathan M. Thompson (November 16, 1971 – February 19, 2023) was a game designer.

== Career ==
Jonathan M. Thompson was known for his works for alternate historical role playing games, most notably the Gaslight Victorian Fantasy Setting. He was the founder and creative force behind the RPG publishing company Battlefield Press International, which has a long line of alternate history role playing games, along with a few in other genres as well. Thompson was also the system designer for the Prime Directive PD20 line published by Amarillo Design Bureau.

== Education ==
Thompson earned a Masters in Military History from the University of Louisiana at Monroe (ULM).

== Selected role-playing game credits for other companies ==
- Comicworld Germany for ICONS Superpowered Roleplaying (Editor / GRAmel Publishing)
- Beasts & Barbarians Player's Guide (Additional Materials / GRAmel Publishing)
- Federation PD20 Modern (PD20 system Contributor / Amarillo Design Bureau)
- Romulans d20/PD20 Modern (PD20 system Contributor / Amarillo Design Bureau)
- Klingons d20/PD20 Modern (PD20 system Contributor / Amarillo Design Bureau)
- Prime Directive PD20 Modern (PD20 system Contributor / Amarillo Design Bureau)
- Prime Directive d20 (PD20 system Contributor / Amarillo Design Bureau)
- Hungry Little Monsters (Contributor / Sean K. Reynolds Publishing)

== Selected role-playing game credits for Battlefield Press ==
- Open Anime Role Playing System (with Ewen Cluney and Christopher Helton) (June 2010)
- Gaslight Victorian Fantasy (OGL Edition) (with Stephen J. Miller) (June 2008)
- Gaslight Victorian Fantasy (Savage Worlds Edition) (with Stephen J. Miller) (July 2009)
- Open Core Role Playing System (with Christopher Helton) (January 2006)
- Pulp Fantasy (d20) (September 2005)
- 1632 Role Playing Game and Resource Guide (Action! System)
- Luftwaffe 1946 Role Playing Game Second Edition (Open Core))
- Luftwaffe 1946 Role Playing Game (Action! System)
- Cityscape: City on the Nexus of the Omniverse (November 2002)

== Convention appearances ==
- Thompson was a guest of honor at MechaCon in 2006.
- Thompson was a guest of honor at MechaCon in 2007.
- Thompson was the table-top gaming guest at MechaCon in 2012.
