= U.S. Renditions =

American entertainment company

- Founded: February 1987
- Defunct: mid-1990s
- Fate: Dissolved
- Headquarters: Carson, California, USA
- Key people: Robert Napton; David Keith Riddick; Kevin Seymour
- Products: Anime
- Parent: Books Nippan

U.S. Renditions was a Special Projects Division of Books Nippan (which was the American branch of Nippon Shuppan Hanbai) and one of the pioneers of anime home video distribution in North America.

The company also had a label called Dark Image Entertainment, which was geared for mature audiences. Titles under Dark Image Entertainment included Ambassador Magma, Devilman and Guyver: Out of Control.

== History ==
The division was founded in February 1987 by Kevin Seymour, David Keith Riddick, Sho Nagata and Satoshi Komatsu. Robert Napton later joined the division and became a key figure in its productions.

After producing two music projects for the Robotech television series, U.S. Renditions produced the very first subtitled direct-to-home anime video for the American anime market. In March 1990, they began a release of a subtitled version of Gunbuster, followed in the same month by Dangaioh. They also released such subtitled hits as Appleseed and Black Magic M-66, and even began dubbing anime in 1992, the year their release of Dangaioh was completed. Their first dubbing projects included Macross II, Giant Robo and Fight! Iczer-One. These video projects were a joint venture with L.A. Hero, which was headed by Ken Iyadomi. U.S. Renditions also worked with U.S. Manga Corps on a select number of titles.

U.S. Renditions had a deal with Manga Entertainment's UK Division to distribute selected anime titles and have them dubbed in-house, before Island Records established Manga's North American operations via its acquisition of L.A. Hero in 1994.

When Books Nippan ceased operations in the mid-1990s, U.S. Renditions was dissolved. Books Nippan's animation division was later acquired by Digital Manga. Kevin Seymour went on to become a successful anime English voice director and co-founded Animaze. Robert Napton became the director of Bandai U.S.A.'s manga division. Ken Iyadomi went on to produce/co-produce domestic releases by Manga Entertainment and Bandai Entertainment. Although some of their releases have seen re-release through Bandai Visual USA (which subsequently merged with Bandai Entertainment), Manga Entertainment and Media Blasters, other titles such as the original uncut subtitled version of Dangaioh, Ambassador Magma and Guyver: Out of Control were never re-released and have remained out of print on home video.

== Releases ==
U.S. Renditions releases
Year	Title	Medium	Notes
1987	Robotech: BGM Collection, Volume 1	Music LP	
1989	Robotech: Perfect Collection	Music LP	
1990	Dangaioh	OVA series	3 eps.; later released by Manga Entertainment
1990	Gunbuster	OVA series	6 eps.; later released by Bandai Visual and Discotek Media
1991	Black Magic M-66	OVA series	1 ep.; later released by Manga Entertainment and Sentai Filmworks
1992	Kabuto the Golden Eye Monster, AKA Raven Tengu Kabuto †	OVA series	1 ep.
1992–1993	Macross II: Lovers Again	OVA series	6 eps.; later released by Manga Entertainment; currently on Kickstarter by AnimEigo
1992	The Guyver: Bio-Booster Armor	OVA series	12 eps.
1993	Guyver: Out of Control †	OVA series	1 ep.
1993	Outlanders †	OVA series	1 ep.; later released by Central Park Media and Discotek Media
1994	Giant Robo: The Day the Earth Stood Still	OVA series	7 eps.; later released by Media Blasters and Discotek Media
	Ambassador Magma †	OVA series	13 eps.
	Appleseed	OVA series	1 ep.; later released by Manga Entertainment and Discotek Media
	Devilman †	OVA series	2 eps.; later released by Discotek Media
	Dragon Century	OVA series	2 eps.
	Fight! Iczer One	OVA series	3 eps.; later released by Media Blasters
	Super Dimension Century Orguss	TV series	17/35 eps.; later released by ImaginAsian and Discotek Media
† = Released under the imprint Dark Image Entertainment.
