= Tommy Yune =

Korean-American comic artist

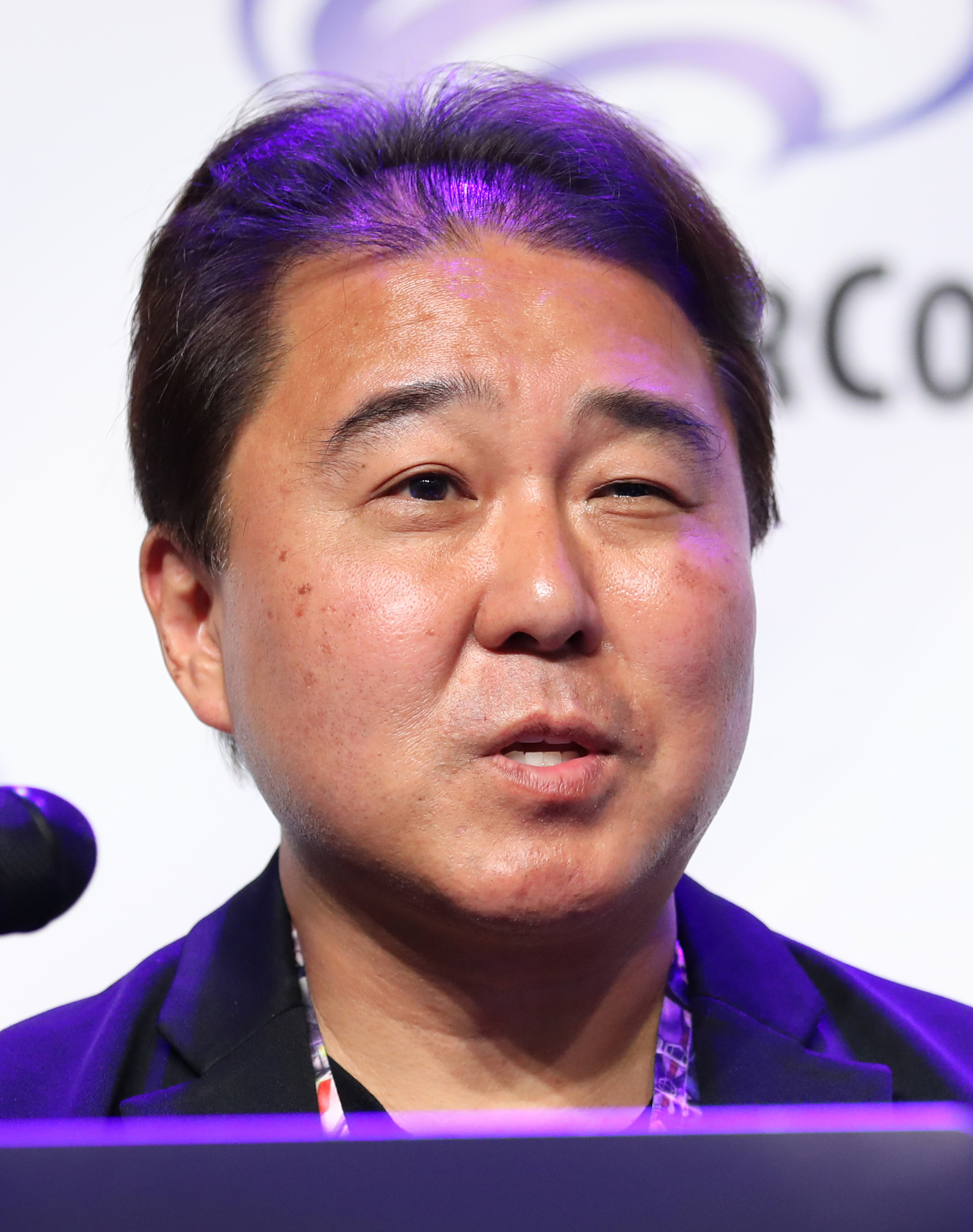
- Yune at the 2024 WonderCon
- Born: Seoul, South Korea
- Education: Art Center College of Design
- Occupation: President of animation

Korean name
- Hangul: 윤태선
- Hanja: 尹泰善
- RR: Yun Taeseon
- MR: Yun T'aesŏn

Tommy Yune is a South Korean-born American comic book author who became known for his manga-style work on Speed Racer, which was followed by a comic industry revival of classic anime shows such as Battle of the Planets and Robotech. His video game credits include FX Fighter, Robotech: Battlecry, and the award-winning The Journeyman Project series.

Yune first began in comics with the 1992 cult anthropomorphic series Buster the Amazing Bear and joined Jim Lee at Wildstorm Productions after a number of years as a video game designer. After writing and illustrating Speed Racer in 1999, he followed up with two more manga-style miniseries, Racer X and Danger Girl: Kamikaze. His original Speed Racer run was also re-released in 2000 as the graphic novel titled Born to Race.

Yune's first work in feature animation was creating the computer-generated opening sequence of Kevin Altieri's Gen¹³. In 2001, he left Wildstorm to become creative director at Harmony Gold USA for the relaunch of Robotech. He joined Steve Yun, the "webmaster" of the official Robotech webpage who also happens to be his brother. He is one of the writers behind the story of Robotech: The Shadow Chronicles and its canceled sequel Robotech: The Shadow Rising.

In 2011, he was promoted to President of Animation at Harmony Gold USA. Two years later, he helped write and produce Robotech: Love Live Alive while Gregory Snegoff directed. In 2014, he was involved in the failed Kickstarter TV pilot project Robotech: Academy.

Tommy was very close to his father, the late John S. Yun, and often sought his approval for his work. His father was specially credited in The Journeyman Project: Pegasus Prime and Robotech: Love Live Alive.

== AnimeExpo 2007 pie incident ==
On July 2, 2007, at the Anime Expo in Long Beach, California, the late Adam Schiller (who went by the username "Khyron Prime" on Robotech.com's forums), hit Yune in the face with a plate full of cream pie. Schiller's intended attacker was Harmony Gold employee and Robotech.com "webmaster" Steve Yun, with Yune as his secondary target. After being pied, Yune picked up the plate and returned the favor to Schiller before they both posed for a picture, which was ironically taken by Steve Yun.

== Filmography ==
- Robotech: The Shadow Chronicles (2006) - Director
- Robotech: Love Live Alive (2013) - Writer
- Robotech: Remastered Extended Edition (2003) - Opening and episode titles
- Gen¹³ (2000) - Opening title animation

== Ludography ==
- Robotech: Invasion (2004) - Producer
- Robotech: Battlecry (2002) - Producer, Character design
- The Journeyman Project 3: Legacy of Time (1998) - Creative Director, Conceptual design
- The Journeyman Project: Pegasus Prime (1997) - Conceptual design, Special effects
- FX Fighter (1995) - Character design
- The Journeyman Project (1992) - Conceptual design

== Bibliography ==
- Robotech/Voltron (2013) - Story, Cover art
- The Art of Robotech: The Shadow Chronicles (2007)
- Robotech: Prelude to the Shadow Chronicles (2005–06) - Story
- Robotech: Invasion (2004) - Story, Cover Art
- Robotech/Robotech: From the Stars (2002–03) - Story, Cover Art
- Danger Girl: Kamikaze (2001) - Story, Art
- Racer X (2000) - Story, Cover art
- Superman Y2K (2000) - CG Art
- Speed Racer/Speed Racer: Born to Race (1999–2000) - Story, Art
- Buster the Amazing Bear (1992–1995) - Story, Art

== Awards ==
- Book of the Month - August 1999 Wizard Magazine (Speed Racer)
- Award of excellence: technical & creative excellence - 1997 NewMedia Invision Awards (Journeyman Project 3)
- Gold medal: best overall design, animation - 1997 NewMedia Invision Awards (Journeyman Project 3)
- Silver medal: best animation, graphics - 1996 NewMedia Invision Awards (Journeyman Project: Pegasus Prime)
- Finalist: best action/arcade software program - 1996 Codies Awards (FX Fighter)
- Gold medal: best animation, graphics - 1993 NewMedia Invision Awards (The Journeyman Project)
- Bronze medal: best production design - 1993 NewMedia Invision Awards (The Journeyman Project)
- Award of Excellence - 1991 Society for News Design (Orange County Register)
- 1st place: best graphics - 1990 California Newspaper Publishers Association (UCLA Daily Bruin)
- 2nd place: best graphics - 1989 California Newspaper Publishers Association (UCLA Daily Bruin)
