= Tyco R/C: Assault with a Battery =

2000 video game

- Developer: Lucky Chicken Games
- Publisher: Mattel Interactive
- Designers: Matt Saia and Keith Kirby
- Composer: Robert Casady
- Platform: PlayStation
- Release: NA: September 19, 2000; JP: June 13, 2002
- Genres: Racing, Simulation
- Modes: Single-player, multiplayer

Tyco R/C: Assault With a Battery is a PlayStation game that shipped in September 2000. The game was based on the Tyco Toys R/C brand radio-controlled cars and features, and hence has titles from real R/C cars by Tyco. The game was developed by Lucky Chicken Games and published by Mattel Interactive. It received some acclaim from online game review sources, but was lost at retail during Mattel's exit of the Video Games business as a result of their failed acquisition of The Learning Company.

The name of the game is a play on words of two types of crimes, Assault and Battery.

== Vehicles ==
- Hot Rocker (Hot Rod)
- Speed Wrench (Pickup Truck)
- Tantrum (Dune Buggy)
- Mini Rebound 4x4
- Nitro Dozer
- Recoil (Monster Truck)
- Super Rebound 4X4

== Reception ==
Reception

Aggregate score
| Aggregator | Score |
|---|---|
| GameRankings | 67% |

Review scores
| Publication | Score |
|---|---|
| CNET Gamecenter | 6/10 |
| Electronic Gaming Monthly | 3/10 |
| EP Daily | 8.5/10 |
| Famitsu | 23/40 |
| GameFan | 68% (Note: In GameFan's viewpoint of the game, three critics gave it each a score of 60, 72, and 71.) |
| GameSpot | 6.7/10 |
| IGN | 7.5/10 |
| Next Generation | 3/5 |
| Official U.S. PlayStation Magazine | 2/5 |

The game received average reviews according to the review aggregation website GameRankings. Emmett Schkloven of NextGen said that the game was "Neither a monster nor a must-have, but a quick and entertaining diversion nonetheless." In Japan, where the game was ported and published by Syscom as part of the World Greatest Hits Series on June 13, 2002, Famitsu gave it a score of 23 out of 40.
