= MechaCon =

Anime convention held in Louisiana, USA

Coordinates: 29°56′59″N 90°4′38″W

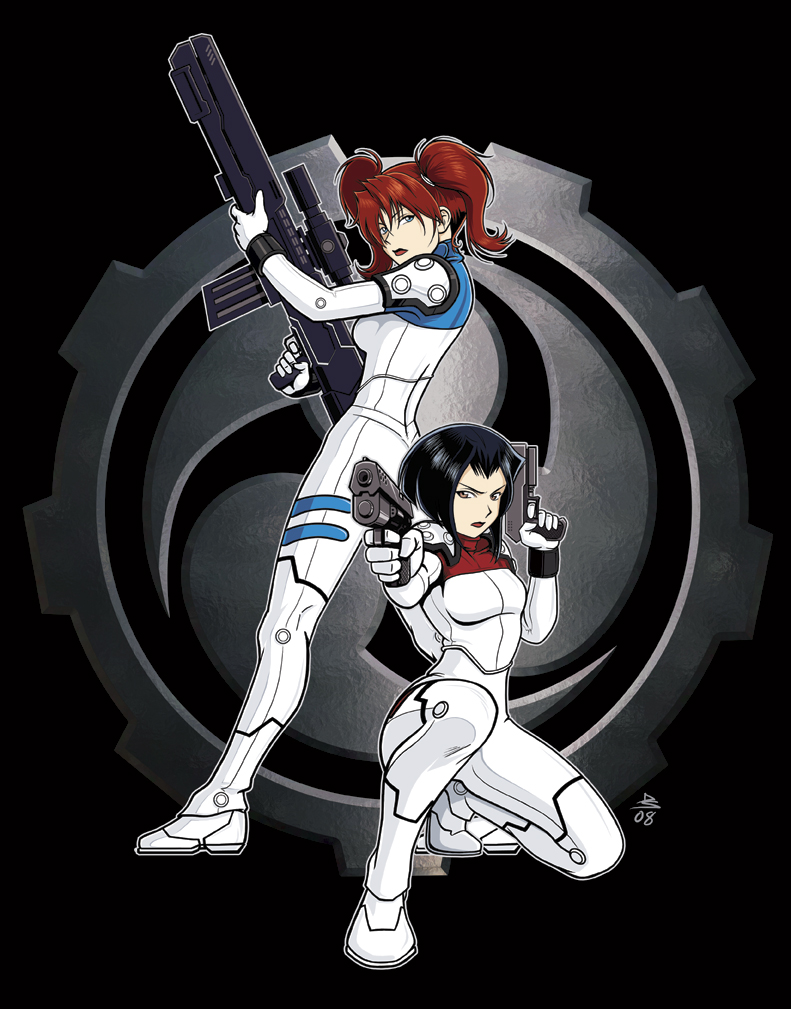
- MechaCon mascots: Jett and Zee
- Status: Defunct
- Genre: Anime, Manga, Transformers, and Japanese culture.
- Venue: Hyatt Regency New Orleans
- Location: New Orleans, Louisiana
- Country: United States
- Inaugurated: 2005
- Attendance: 18,645 turnstile in 2021
- Organizer: Sennin Productions, LLC

MechaCon was an annual three-day anime convention held during the summer at the Hyatt Regency New Orleans in New Orleans, Louisiana. It was the oldest active anime convention in Louisiana.

== Programming ==
The convention typically offered an artist's alley, cosplay competition, dealer's room, gaming, and maid/host show.

== History ==
MechaCon's inaugural weekend in 2005 is unique because Hurricane Katrina made landfall on the coast of Louisiana hours after MechaCon closed its doors. The dealers room closed early and all but one guest made their flight. In 2006, as a special part of MechaCon's 2006 programming, Harmony Gold USA provided fans of the Robotech franchise with the first-ever public screening of the film Robotech: The Shadow Chronicles. 100% of the funds raised from the screening was donated to The Salvation Army's ongoing Hurricane Katrina and Hurricane Rita recovery efforts.

A 2019 press release announced that the final Mechacon, dubbed "Mechacon Omega", would be held in July 2020. MechaCon 2020 was cancelled due to the COVID-19 pandemic. The final MechaCon was held from July 23–25, 2021.

=== Event history ===
Dates	Location	Atten.	Guests
August 26–28, 2005	Hilton Lafayette; Lafayette, Louisiana	900 warm	Tiffany Grant, Limit Break Cosplay, Joshua Seth, Doug Smith, and Alec Willows.
August 11–13, 2006	Hilton Lafayette; Lafayette, Louisiana	1,275 warm	Garry Chalk, Lisa Furukawa, Brittney Karbowski, Limit Break Cosplay, Kevin McKeever, Scott McNeil, Richard Newman, Doug Smith, Kira Vincent-Davis, Brett Weaver, and Alec Willows.
August 3–5, 2007	Hilton Lafayette; Lafayette, Louisiana	1,700 warm	Michael Dobson, Richard Epcar, Lisa Furukawa, Tiffany Grant, Matt Greenfield, Limit Break Cosplay, Mike McFarland, Kevin McKeever, Scott McNeil, Ellyn Stern, and Jonathan M. Thompson.
August 1–3, 2008	Hilton Lafayette; Lafayette, Louisiana	2,200 warm	Greg Ayres, Beau Billingslea, Steve Blum, John Chambers, Francesco Forni, Lisa Furukawa, Ilaria Graziano, Carl Macek, Mary Elizabeth McGlynn, and Tommy Yune.
July 24–26, 2009	Hilton Lafayette; Lafayette, Louisiana	2,850 warm	Christopher Ayres, Greg Ayres, Garry Chalk, Samantha Inoue-Harte, David Kaye, Kevin McKeever, Vic Mignogna, and Wendy Powell.
July 16–18, 2010	New Orleans Marriott; New Orleans, Louisiana	3,700 warm	Chris Cason, Richard Epcar, Todd Haberkorn, Mari Iijima, Mike McFarland, Kevin McKeever, Vic Mignogna, Tony Oliver, Wendy Powell, Ellyn Stern, J. Michael Tatum, Dan Woren, Tommy Yune, and Robotech Convention Tour.
August 26–28, 2011	Hilton New Orleans Riverside; New Orleans, Louisiana	4,500 warm	Amelie Belcher, Steve Blum, Johnny Yong Bosch, Clover, Eyeshine, Lisa Furukawa, Kyle Hebert, Samantha Inoue-Harte, Jonathan Klein, Mary Elizabeth McGlynn, Kevin McKeever, Scott McNeil, and J. Michael Tatum.
September 7–9, 2012	Hilton New Orleans Riverside; New Orleans, Louisiana	5,000 warm	Amelie Belcher, Eien Strife, Richard Epcar, Jason David Frank, Todd Haberkorn, Samantha Inoue-Harte, Jonathan Klein, Brian "Kuragiman" Navy, April Martin, Carl Martin, Mary Elizabeth McGlynn, Vic Mignogna, Robby Musso, Daran Norris, Wendy Powell, Ellyn Stern, Jonathan M. Thompson, and Steve Yun.
August 23–25, 2013	Hilton New Orleans Riverside; New Orleans, Louisiana	11,300 turnstile	Karan Ashley, Johnny Yong Bosch, Steve Cardenas, Daniel Coglan, Jillian Coglan, Eyeshine, Walter E. Jones, Jonathan Klein, Cyril Lumboy, Jason Narvy, Paul Schrier, Hynden Walch, Greg Weisman, David Yost, and Tommy Yune.
August 1–3, 2014	Hilton New Orleans Riverside; New Orleans, Louisiana	13,953 turnstile	Amelie Belcher, Greg Cipes, Eien Strife, Tiffany Grant, Jonathan Klein, Brian "Kuragiman" Navy, Scott Menville, Jessica Nova, Khary Payton, Jessie Pridemore, Andrea Romano, Kelli Sarré, Spike Spencer, Tara Strong, Twinfools, Hynden Walch, and Greg Weisman.
July 17–19, 2015	Hilton New Orleans Riverside; New Orleans, Louisiana	15,180 turnstile	Steven Blum, Steve Kenson, Jonathan Klein, Kyle "Ex-Shadow" Mathis, Malinda "Malindachan" Mathis, Mike McFarland, Mary Elizabeth McGlynn, Courtney "Courtoon" Morelock, Nylon Pink, Brina Palencia, Austin Tindle, Greg Weisman, and Tommy Yun.
July 29–31, 2016	Hilton New Orleans Riverside; New Orleans, Louisiana	16,567 turnstile	Amelie Belcher, Caleb Hyles, Kazha, Courtney "Courtoon" Morelock, Jason Narvy, Khary Payton, Wendy Powell, Paul Schrier, and Steve Yun.
July 28–30, 2017	Hyatt Regency New Orleans; New Orleans, Louisiana	14,808 turnstile	Aaron Dismuke, Richard Epcar, Caitlin Glass, Kyle Hebert, Caleb Hyles, Jonathan Klein, MeltingMirror, The Slants, Ellyn Stern, J. Michael Tatum, and Kimura U.
July 27–29, 2018	Hyatt Regency New Orleans; New Orleans, Louisiana	16,495 turnstile	Anjali Bhimani, Beau Billingslea, Fighting Dreamers Productions, Erika Harlacher, Mary Elizabeth McGlynn, Brina Palencia, Bill Rogers, and Marc Swint.
July 26–28, 2019	Hyatt Regency New Orleans; New Orleans, Louisiana	15,897 turnstile	Leah Clark, Kara Eberle, Kohei Hattori, Lindsay Jones, Jonathan Klein, Mela Lee, Keith Silverstein, TiA, Twinzik, and Hynden Walch.
July 23–25, 2021	Hyatt Regency New Orleans; New Orleans, Louisiana	18,645 turnstile	Dani Chambers, Cynthia Cranz, Lisa Furukawa, Daman Mills, and Wendy Powell.
