= Lucky Chicken Games =

American video game developer

- Founded: 1998
- Founder: Jamie Ottilie (founder); Matt Saia (founder); Jonnathan Hilliard (founder)
- Headquarters: Santa Monica, California, U.S.

Lucky Chicken Games is an American video game developer founded in 1998 in Santa Monica, California by Jamie Ottilie, Matt Saia and Jonnathan Hilliard.

Luck Chicken Games was purchased by mobile game publisher AEGF in partnership with Abandon Mobile in 2005 and became the production and development operation of the mobile game company. Although Lucky Chicken Games no longer exists as a distinct entity, some of Abandon Mobile's internally developed games credit "Lucky Chicken Games" as the developer, as do games developed by Abandon Mobile for other publishers.

== List of games ==
- Hot Wheels Stunt Track Driver
- BattleTanx (Game Boy Color)
- SeaStrike
- Land Before Time Dinosaur Arcade
- Tyco RC: Assault With a Battery
- Matchbox Emergency Patrol
- Casper: Spirit Dimensions
- Robotech: The Macross Saga
- Aquaman: Battle for Atlantis
- Tonka: Rescue Patrol (2003)
- Underworld: The Eternal War
- NHRA 2005 Championship Drag Racing
- Emergency Patrol
