= Robotech Defenders =

Line of scale model kits

Publication information
- Publisher: DC Comics
- Schedule: Limited
- Format: Limited series
- Genre: Science fiction
- Publication date: DC Comics: January 1985 - April 1985
- No. of issues: 2
- Main character: see the comic series enclosed with the model kits

Creative team
- Written by: Andrew Helfer
- Penciller: Judith A. Hunt
- Inker: Murphy Anderson
- Letterer: Ben Oda

The Robotech Defenders are a line of scale model kits released by Revell during the early 1980s with an accompanying limited comic series published by DC Comics. Contrary to what their name seems to imply, the "'Robotech Defenders'" are not part of the Robotech anime universe adapted by Carl Macek and released by Harmony Gold USA, but they did adopt the same moniker and logo.

The "Robotech Defenders" were one of two "Robotech" lines released by Revell, the other being the "Robotech Changers". The "Robotech Changers" line initially consisted of three models based on the Valkyrie Variable fighter designs from Macross, and the NEBO model, based upon the Orguss of Super Dimension Century Orguss.

The "Robotech Defenders" model line was tied into a two-issue limited series of the same name, published by DC comics. It shares many common themes with other science fiction series of that time, including invading aliens, and giant mechanical war machines.

== Model review ==
Seeking to capitalize on the Mecha craze of the early 1980s, Model Company Revell went to Japan to look for suitable mecha models prior to 1984. They eventually licensed a number of Takara's Fang of the Sun Dougram models for the "Defenders" line. These models were repackaged with the "Robotech" moniker, and released in North America and Europe.

The humanoid Mech models had an average size of 30 cm, the in-scale humans were about 2 cm. One of the features of the models was that they were not static, but had fully movable joints and removable equipment. Because of the complexity, details and parts they can be challenging and require adult skill level even though they were sold with "ages 12 and up" on their packaging. Even experienced modelers found them challenging.

In the North American market, the model kits met with much success, appealing to both fans of Robotech and the players of Battletech tabletop strategy game. In Europe, however, model sales were disappointing, possibly due to the non-existent background story included with the models, and the relatively high prices.

== Model details ==
=== Robotech Defenders ===
Listed below are the Revell Robotech Defenders model kits by number and the source of the model (as well as the corresponding BattleTech name, if known):

Model #	Name	Scale	Anime origin	Anime name	BattleTech name
1126	Excalibur Mk.VI	1/72	Super Dimension Fortress Macross	MBR-04-Mk.VI Destroid Tomahawk	Warhammer
1145	Exaxes	1/48	Super Dimension Century Orguss	RSG-21A-1 "Ishfon"	
1146	Decimax	1/48	Super Dimension Century Orguss	MBG-24C "Nikick"	
1148	Aqualo	1/72	Fang of the Sun Dougram	Soltic H404S "Mackerel"	
1149	Ziyon	1/72	Fang of the Sun Dougram	Soltic HT-128 "Bigfoot"	BattleMaster
1150	Thoren	1/48*	Fang of the Sun Dougram	Soltic H8 "Roundfacer"	Griffin
1151	Zoltek	1/48*	Fang of the Sun Dougram	"Dougram"	Shadow Hawk
1152	Condar	1/48*	Fang of the Sun Dougram	Soltic H-102 "Bushman"	
1153	Talos	1/48	Fang of the Sun Dougram	Abitate T-10B "Blockhead"	Wolverine
1154	Gartan	1/48	Fang of the Sun Dougram	Ironfoot F4X "Hasty"	Thunderbolt
1161	Ice Rover	1/48 & 1/72	Fang of the Sun Dougram	Eastland ARH-52 "Groundsearch" Air Cushion Vehicle	
1162	Terrattacker	1/48	Fang of the Sun Dougram	Bromry JRS "Native Dancer" Combat Buggy	
1184	Dromedin	1/72	Fang of the Sun Dougram	Abitate F44A "Crab Gunner"	Goliath
1187	Sand Stalker	1/72	Fang of the Sun Dougram	Abitate F44S "Desert Gunner"	
1191	Armored Combat Team	1/72	Fang of the Sun Dougram	Soltic H8 "Roundfacer", Bromry ST-48D APC, HT-38D Truck, & OR-39D Willys Fighting Jeep	
1192	Strike Force	1/72	Fang of the Sun Dougram	Ironfoot F4X "Hasty" & Culailles MP-2 "Duey" Attack Helicopter	
1193	Assault Squad	1/72	Fang of the Sun Dougram	Abitate F35C "Blizzard Gunner & Bromry "ARMC Instead" Wheeled Armoured Vehicle	Scorpion
1194	Robot Recovery Unit	1/72	Fang of the Sun Dougram	Bromry "Eyevan" DT-2 Trailer Truck	
1197	Airborne Attackers	1/72	Fang of the Sun Dougram	Soltic H-102 "Bushman" & Eastland WE-211 "Mavellic" Combat Armour Transport Helicopter	
1199	Commando	1/48	Fang of the Sun Dougram	Abitate F44B "Tequila Gunner"	Goliath

1150 "Thoren" & 1151 "Zoltek" models are 1/48 scale though marked on the box as 1/72.

1152 "Condar" model kit was boxed in two versions, one stating scale as 1/72(wrong) and one as 1/48(correct) though both were same kit.

- Robotech Defender "Exaxes" (1145: 1/48 Scale) is the Orguss RSG-21A-1 "Ishfon" walker - not transformable.
- Robotech Defender "Decimax" (1146: 1/48 Scale) is the Orguss MBG-24C "Nikick" - not transformable.
- Robotech Defender "Aqualo" (1148: 1/72 Scale) is the Dougram H404S "Mackerel" Marine Combat Armor.
- Robotech Defender "Ziyon" (1149: 1/72 Scale) is the Dougram Soltic HT-128 "Bigfoot" Combat Armor-not transformable (Battletech "Battlemaster").
- Robotech Defender "Thoren" (1150: 1/48 Scale) is the Dougram Soltic H8 "Roundfacer" Combatc Armor-not transformable (Battletech "Griffon").
- Robotech Defender "Zoltek" (1151: 1/48 Scale) is the Dougram D7 "Dougram" Combat Armor-not transformable (Battletech "Shadow Hawk").
- Robotech Defender "Condar" (1152: 1/48 Scale) is the Dougram Soltic H-102 "Bushman" Combat Armor-not transformable.
- Robotech Defender "Talos" (1153: 1/48 Scale) is the Dougram T-10B "Blockhead" Combat Armor-not transformable (Battletech "Wolverine").
- Robotech Defender "Gartan" (1154: 1/48 Scale) is the Dougram Ironfoot F4X "Hasty" Combat Armor-not transformable (Battletech "Thunderbolt").
- Robotech Defender "Ice Rover" (1161: 1/48 Scale) is the Dougram Eastland ARH-52 "Groundsearch", an air-cushioned hovercraft vehicle - not transformable.
- Robotech Defender "Terrattacker" (1162: 1/48 Scale) is the Dougram Bromry JRS "Native Dancer", a light 6-wheeled AFV/jeep - not transformable.
- Robotech Defender "Sand Stalker" (1187: 1/72 Scale) is the Dougram Abitate F44S "Desert Gunner" 6-legged Walker Tank-not transformable.
- Robotech Defender "Armored Combat Team" (1191: 1/72 Scale) is the Dougram Soltic H8 "Roundfacer" Combat Armor-not transformable, with infantry jeeps (Robotech Defender "Thoren").
- Robotech Defender "Strike Force" (1192: 1/72 Scale) is a Dougram Ironfoot F4X "Hasty" Combat Armor and a Culailles MP-2 "Dewey" attack helicopter-not transformable (Robotech Defender "Gartan").
- Robotech Defender "Assault Squad" (1193: 1/72 Scale) is a Dougram Abitate F35C "Blizzard Gunner" Walker Tank and an ARMC Instead AFV light attack vehicle (Walker Tank used as Battletech "Scorpion").
- Robotech Defender "Robot Recovery Unit" (1194: 1/72 Scale) is a Dougram Bromry "Eyevan" DT-2 Trailer Truck.
- Robotech Defender "Airborne Attacker" (1197: 1/72 Scale) is a Dougram Soltic H-102 "Bushman" Combat Armor and an Eastland WE-211 "Mavellic" cargo-lifting helicopter-not transformable (Robotech Defender "Condar").
- Robotech Defender "Commando" (1199: 1/48 Scale) is the Dougram Abitate F44B "Tequila Gunner" 4-legged Walker Tank-not transformable.

=== Robotech Changers ===
Listed below are the Revell Robotech Changers model kits by number and the source of the model (as well as the corresponding BattleTech name, if known):

Model #	Name	Scale	Anime origin	Anime name	Battletech name
??	Drifand Dal	1/48	Super Dimension Century Orguss	"Drifand Dal"	
1001	Orguss	1/48	Super Dimension Century Orguss	"Orguss"	
1002	Nikick	1/48	Super Dimension Century Orguss	"Nikick"	
1003	Olson	1/48	Super Dimension Century Orguss	"Orguss II Olson Special"	
1004	OrgussII	1/48	Super Dimension Century Orguss	"Orguss II"	
1399	Tabor	1/48	Super Dimension Century Orguss	"Orguss"	
1400	Nebo	1/48	Super Dimension Century Orguss	"Orguss"	
1401	Orbot	1/72	Super Dimension Fortress Macross	"VF-1D Valkyrie"	
1402	Vexar	1/72	Super Dimension Fortress Macross	"VF-1S Valkyrie"	Wasp
1403	Axoid	1/72	Super Dimension Fortress Macross	"VF-1J Valkyrie"	
1404	Factory	1/100	Super Dimension Fortress Macross	"VF-1J Armored Valkyrie" & MBR-04-Mk.VI Destroid Tomahawk	Crusader & Warhammer
1405	Trigon	1/48	Super Dimension Century Orguss	"Drifand Dal"	
1406	VF-1J Fighter	1/100	Super Dimension Fortress Macross	"VF-1J Valkyrie"	
1407	VF-1S Battloid	1/100	Super Dimension Fortress Macross	"VF-1S Super Valkyrie"	Phoenix Hawk
1408	VF-1D Guardian	1/100	Super Dimension Fortress Macross	"VF-1D Super Valkyrie"	
1409	VF-1A Fighter	1/100	Super Dimension Fortress Macross	"VF-1A Super Valkyrie"	

=== Robotech ===
Listed below are the Revell Robotech model kits by number and the source of the model (as well as the corresponding BattleTech name, if known):

Model #	Name	Scale	Anime origin	Anime name	BattleTech name
1143	Attack Fortress SDFI	1/5000	Super Dimension Fortress Macross	SDF-1 "Storm Attacker Mode"	
1144	Space Fortress SDFI	1/5000	Super Dimension Fortress Macross	SDF-1 "Cruiser Mode"	
1170	Khyrons Battle Pod	1/72	Super Dimension Fortress Macross	Zentradi "Glaug Commander Pod"	Marauder

Revell Robotech models from the Fang of the Sun Dougram line seem to be repacks of model kits made by Takara. The models from the Super Dimension Fortress Macross line seem to be repacks of model kits made by Imai. The models from the Super Dimension Century Orguss line seem to be repacks of model kits made by Arii.

== Marketing confusion ==
Release of the "'Robotech Defenders'" and "'Robotech Changers'" model lines caused problems for media company Harmony Gold USA, who licensed the North American video rights to the Japanese Macross anime series, combining it with two other series to produce an 85 episode series they hoped to market direct to video. Since Revell was already distributing the models, Harmony Gold could not support the show with merchandising. In the end, both companies decided to enter into a co-licensing agreement and the name Robotech was eventually adopted for the syndicated television show that the home video line had transformed into.

Players of FASA's BattleTech tabletop strategy game universe will instantly recognize many of the Revell models as Mechs from the original Role Playing Game sourcebooks. The reason for this is that all of the original edition's 'Mech visuals were based on designs from a variety of anime series, including Macross, Dougram and Crusher Joe, some of which Revell kits are sourced. FASA eventually became embroiled in a lawsuit with Harmony Gold regarding the use of Macross images, and after which FASA removed all Macross related images along with any other images not created in house from their Sourcebooks. Those 'Mechs would later be known by BattleTech fans as 'The Unseen'.

== Comic books ==
The eponymous comic book, a two-issue mini-series, was published by DC Comics in 1984. It was originally intended to be a trilogy, but was reduced to the first normal-sized issue and a 32-page second issue with no advertisement. The universe of the "'Robotech Defenders'" comic book series bears no resemblance at all to the Robotech universe adapted by Harmony Gold USA. The Robotech Defenders comic predates the conception of the original Robotech cartoon show by about a year.

The story followed the battles of a team of pilots who fight a savage race of aliens, called "Grelons", who have invaded all planets of a star system using superior technology. They plan to colonize the planets, using their titanic war machines to eliminate all resistance. The heroes, a small combat unit, are losing badly when their leader accidentally activates one of the Robotech Defenders. She then learns of the existence of the other machines, which are scattered on the other pilots' home planets. Each of these units has a unique range of abilities and environmental specialties (e.g., Aqualo was capable of diving and sea-based activities, Ziyon's Element was cold and snow, Thoren's heat and magma, Gartan's urban combat).

By the end of the first issue, the team have managed to recover all the robots and engage the enemy in battle, but are still defeated and get captured. They escape by pushing a big red button which releases the Defenders' minds, unleashing the latter's' full combat capabilities. The pilots then track down the controllers of the savage aliens. They defeat them by causing the evil alien energy siphon to suck the energy from the sun, causing their space ship to explode.

=== Revell comic ===
Revell's division in West Germany, Revell Plastic, GmbH, published a one-shot promotional issue of Robotech Defenders with a subtitle translating to "The Defenders of the Cosmos". Written by W. Spiegel with Artwork by W. Neugebauer, this original comic was not a reprint of the DC Comics series and was not connected to its continuity. It was translated to Swedish and packaged with the model. Like the DC Comics series, it also had no connection to the TV series.
