= Robotech: Crystal Dreams =

- Preliminary cover art
- Developer: GameTek
- Publisher: N/A
- Designers: Doug Lanford, Lizard Harac
- Platform: Nintendo 64
- Release: Canceled
- Genre: Flight simulator
- Modes: Single player, multiplayer

Robotech: Crystal Dreams is a canceled Robotech video game, developed by GameTek for the Nintendo 64.

== Gameplay ==
Crystal Dreams takes place between the first and second story arcs of the animated series. It follows the adventures of Kyle Bartley, a disgraced Robotech Defense Force veritech mecha pilot turned mercenary who fights to protect the Earth and the SDF-3 from new Zentraedi enemies. It is primarily a space fighter simulation game with some resource management elements. The protagonist works as a mercenary and obtains credits based on the type of missions completed. Between levels, the player returns to the base to interact with a variety of characters, buy upgrades, and modify his mecha. The player gets wartime reports of events through space, and can rush to the aid of those that need his help the most and receive more credits for it. The mecha can be transformed into three different forms: "Fighter mode", "Guardian mode", and "Battloid mode".

== Development ==
After purchasing the license for Robotech video games from Activision, GameTek pitched the game to Nintendo. Nintendo approved the project, and a team of ten was assembled to work on the game. It was announced in May 1995 as a launch game for Nintendo 64, with the working title Robotech Academy. By mid-1996, the name had changed to Robotech: Crystal Dreams.

Nintendo provided support to GameTek in learning the Nintendo 64 hardware. According to art director Mimi Doggett, "They know we're just getting used to this new hardware, so they've been patiently supportive. They're not pushing us to get the game out - they'd rather we take our time to make sure that it's good."

Originally planned for a December 1996 release, it was rescheduled to the second quarter of 1997. Following further delays, the release was pushed back again, to December 1997. GameTek filed for Chapter 11 bankruptcy in early December 1997, more than two years into development. The company stated that development of Robotech: Crystal Dreams would not be affected by the bankruptcy. By the end of 1997, Ocean had acquired the rights to the game and said they intended to finish and release it. However, it was canceled days after a working demo was shown at the 1998 E3 trade show. Antarctic Press produced a black and white promotional comic book that was handed out at E3. GameTek was liquidated in late 1998.

== See also ==
- Macross: Another Dimension is the canceled Japanese conversion of Crystal Dreams.
