= Robotech: The Macross Saga =

2002 video game

- Developer: Lucky Chicken Games
- Publisher: TDK Mediactive
- Directors: Jamie Ottilie; Jon Hilliard; James Ryman; Matt Saia
- Designer: Matt Saia
- Platform: Game Boy Advance
- Release: NA: October 16, 2002; EU: November 15, 2002
- Genre: Shoot 'em up
- Modes: Single-player, Multiplayer

Robotech: The Macross Saga is a side-scrolling shoot 'em up for the Game Boy Advance handheld system, developed by Lucky Chicken Games and published by TDK Mediactive. This title was released during a renaissance of Robotech video games, where struggling projects were no longer cancelled and actually made it to market. A remake was published in 2021, Robotech: The Macross Saga HD Edition.

== Gameplay ==
The game centres on the piloting of Veritech Fighters, the transformable mecha that are a notable feature of the Robotech series. The different modes offer unique advantages and vulnerabilities. Fighter mode has the fastest movement, but can't touch the ground. Battloid mode offers much better aim, but mobility is greatly diminished. While the hybrid Guardian mode splits the difference by combining and averaging these features.

The player can choose from their favorite Macross Saga characters (as seen on Masterpiece Collection toys released at the time). Each character offers varying levels of Power (Quantity of missiles), Stamina (Life energy), Strength (Strength of attacks), Piloting (Speed of movement) and Speed (Speed of Battloid).

- Rick Hunter
- Max Sterling
- Roy Fokker
- Miriya Parina Sterling
- Ben Dixon

After every few side-scrolling missions, there is an isometric view Destroid mission. Destroids are non-transformable Battloids that serve a similar role as a walking tank. The player can choose from a number of Destroids with different abilities.

The game also included a number of unlockable characters who like the main characters have different power levels. Many also fly different vehicles with their own quirks. Each main character you complete the game with unlocks their secret counterpart.

Link cable support allows for up to four player multiplayer.

== Reception ==
Reception

Aggregate score
Aggregator	Score
Metacritic	61/100

Review scores
Publication	Score
Game Informer	8.5/10
GameSpot	6.5/10
GameSpy	3/5 stars
IGN	5/10
Jeuxvideo.com	5/20
Nintendo Power	3.3/5

Robotech: The Macross Saga received "mixed" reviews according to the review aggregation website Metacritic. It was nominated for GameSpot's annual "Most Disappointing Game on Game Boy Advance" award, which went to The Revenge of Shinobi.

In a retrospective review by Hardcore Gamer's Jason Bohn, he criticized the length of the levels for being too long.
