= Dragon Century =

Japanese OVA series

竜世紀 (Ryūseiki)
- Original video animation
- Directed by: Kiyoshi Fukumoto
- Produced by: Tooru Miura
- Written by: Shō Aikawa
- Music by: Michiaki Katō
- Studio: AIC
- Licensed by: NA: U.S. Renditions
- Released: October 26, 1988 – December 25, 1988
- Runtime: 25 minutes
- Episodes: 2
- Notes
- Episodes 1 and 2 have been compiled into a single episode in some versions.

Dragon Century (Japanese: 竜世紀, Hepburn: Ryūseiki) is a Japanese two-episode OVA anime series that was created by Ryuukihei and produced and animated by the Anime International Company. It was originally released on VHS and laserdisc in Japan in 1988 and then it was eventually subtitled in English by: U.S. Renditions and released in VHS format in the United States/Canada on October 1, 1996. Both OVA episodes were later released on DVD in Japan on January 26, 2006.

The opening and ending theme was performed by J-pop singer Midori Karashima.

== Plot ==
=== God Chapter A.D.1990 Riko ===
The plot takes place in the near-future Hokkaido of 1990. A series of murders is taking place around the world, and dragons suddenly begin appearing in the skies. The dragons are believed to be responsible for the murders, and the Japan Self-Defense Forces begins shooting them out of the sky. Following that, a troubled young girl named Riko witnesses the killing of a dragon, and takes charge of the creature's surviving hatchling. Naming the young dragon Carmine for his red scales, she hopes to raise him for the destruction of her city and the corrupt humanity she has come to hate. However, Riko learns there is more to the dragons than she first thought, and worse things in the world than her fellow humans.

=== Devil Chapter R.C.297 Rulishia ===
300 years after the events of Riko's story, Carmine is fully grown, and now lives alone in a tower in the post-apocalyptic world of 297 R.C. A 15-year-old girl named Rulishia comes to Carmine's tower and steals his horn, becoming (in accordance with dragon law) her master. She names him Vermillion, and takes him to a dragon-fighting tournament called the Ryuto. They win one victory after another, each fight taking Rulishia closer to revenge against the Ryuto team who killed both her father and his dragon. Rulishia and Vermillion grow closer, and she decides to call off her vendetta for his safety. The decision to seek a peaceful life is cut short with the return of the demons which invaded Earth 300 years before. After fighting off an attack by demonic beetles and destroying the demon-corrupted Ryuto team who killed Rulishia's father, Vermillion departs to do battle against the demons as a leader amongst the dragon warriors.

== Voice cast ==
=== God Chapter A.D.1990 Riko ===
Character	(Japan) Original Japanese voices	(United States) English Dubbing voices
Riko	Yoshino Takamori	---
Carmine	Toshihiko Seki	---
Sergeant Sagara	Tesshô Genda	---
Sagara's Superior officer	Shunsuke Shima †	---
Sagara's Assistant	Toshiyuki Shiina	---
Harumi	Sakiko Tamagawa	---

=== Devil Chapter R.C.297 Rulishia ===
Character	(Japan) Original Japanese voices	(United States) English Dubbing voices
Rulishia	Chieko Honda †	---
Carmine (Old age)	Seizō Katō †	---
Maseinen	Kazuyuki Sogabe †	---
Gelda Maseinen	Kiyonobu Suzuki	---

From a source, an English dub is said to exist. It consists of voice talent featuring Beau Billingslea, Lilly Browne, Steve Bulen and Christopher Carroll.
