= Robotech =

American-Japanese science fiction media franchise

- Title screen from the 1984 television broadcast
- Original work: Robotech (1984)
- Owner: Harmony Gold USA

Print publications
- Books: Robotech Art 1 (1986); Robotech Art 2 (1987); Robotech Art 3: The Sentinels (1988); The Art of Robotech: The Shadow Chronicles (2007)
- Novel: Robotech novels
- Comics: Robotech comics

Films and television
- Films: Codename: Robotech (c. 1984); Robotech: The Movie (1986); Robotech II: The Sentinels (1988); Robotech: The Shadow Chronicles (2006); Robotech: Love Live Alive (2013)
- Animated series: Robotech (1984): Robotech: The Macross Saga; Robotech: The Masters; Robotech: The New Generation

Games
- Traditional: Robotech Collectible Card Game
- Role-playing: Robotech role-playing games
- Video games: Robotech: Crystal Dreams (cancelled); Robotech: Battlecry (2002); Robotech: The Macross Saga (2002); Robotech: Invasion (2004); Robotech: The New Generation (2007)

Audio
- Original music: Robotech music

Miscellaneous
- Toys: Robotech Defenders; Robotech Robolinks

Robotech is a Japanese science fiction franchise that began with an 85-episode anime television series produced by Harmony Gold USA in association with Tatsunoko Production; it was first released in the United States in 1984.

The show was adapted from three original and distinct, though visually similar, Japanese anime television series (Super Dimension Fortress Macross, Super Dimension Cavalry Southern Cross, and Genesis Climber MOSPEADA) to make a series suitable for syndication.

U.N. Spacy Roundel

In the series, Robotechnology refers to the scientific advances discovered in an alien starship that crashed on a South Pacific island. With this technology, Earth developed robotic technologies, such as transformable mecha, to fight three successive extraterrestrial invasions.

== Name origin ==
Prior to the release of the TV series, the name Robotech was used by model kit manufacturer Revell on their Robotech Defenders line in the mid-1980s. The line consisted of mecha model kits imported from Japan and featured in anime titles such as Super Dimension Fortress Macross (1982), Super Dimension Century Orguss (1983), and Fang of the Sun Dougram (1981). The kits were originally intended to be a marketing tie-in to a similarly named comic book series by DC Comics, which ran for only two issues.

At the same time, Harmony Gold licensed the Macross TV series for direct-to-video distribution in 1984, but their merchandising plans were compromised by Revell's prior distribution of the Macross kits. In the end, both parties signed a co-licensing agreement and the Robotech name was adopted for the TV syndication of Macross combined with Super Dimension Cavalry Southern Cross (1984) and Genesis Climber MOSPEADA (1983).

== Fictional chronology ==
The Robotech chronology, according to Harmony Gold, is illustrated below:

Timeline	Generation / Saga (release date)
1999 (2009) – 2014	(1)	Robotech: The Macross Saga (1984)
2022		Robotech II: The Sentinels* (1987)
2027		Robotech: The Movie* (1986)
2029–2030	(2)	Robotech: The Masters (1985)
2031 (2042) – 2044	(3)	Robotech: The New Generation (1985)
2044–		Robotech: The Shadow Chronicles (2006)

* Asterisked works are now considered 'secondary continuity'—that is, that their events exist in the continuity of Robotech, but 'don't count' when conflicts arise with the primary continuity that comprises the three-part Robotech TV series and 2006's Robotech: The Shadow Chronicles.

In 2002, with the publication of the WildStorm (DC) comics, Harmony Gold officially decided to retcon the Robotech Universe. The following Robotech material is now relegated to the status of secondary continuity:

- The Sentinels in all its incarnations.
- Robotech: The Movie
- Robotech comics published by Comico, Eternity, Academy, Antarctic Press and Titan Comics.
- Robotech RPGs published by Palladium Books.
- Robotech novels written by Jack McKinney, most notably The End of the Circle.

While these materials are not precisely 'retired' or 'removed' from the continuity, their events are subject to critical review, and are strictly subordinate to the 'official' events of the 85-episode animated series.

== Television and film ==
=== The original television series ===
Robotech (1985) is an original story adapted with edited content and revised dialogue from the animation of three different mecha anime series:

1. Super Dimension Fortress Macross (1982–1983)
2. Super Dimension Cavalry Southern Cross (1984)
3. Genesis Climber MOSPEADA (1983–1984)

Harmony Gold's cited reasoning for combining these unrelated series was its decision to market Macross for American weekday syndication television, which required a minimum of 65 episodes at the time (thirteen weeks at five episodes per week). Macross and the two other series each had fewer episodes than required, since they originally aired in Japan as weekly series. On some television stations, the syndicated run was preceded by the broadcast premiere of Codename: Robotech, a feature-length pilot.

This combination resulted in a storyline that spans three generations, as mankind must fight three destructive 'Robotech Wars' in succession with various invading forces, each of which is motivated in one way or another by a desire for a powerful energy source called 'protoculture'. While each of the three animated series used for its footage informs its content, the Robotech storyline is distinct and separate from each of them.

- The First Robotech War (The Macross Saga) concerns humanity's discovery of a crashed alien ship and subsequent battle against a race of giant warriors called the Zentraedi, who have been sent to retrieve the ship for reasons unknown. In the course of this chapter, Earth is nearly annihilated, the Zentraedi are defeated, and humans gain knowledge of the energy source called protoculture. Humanity also learns of the Robotech Masters whose galactic empire the Zentraedi protected and patrolled.
- The Second Robotech War (The Masters) focuses on the arrival in Earth orbit of the Robotech Masters, who have come seeking what turns out to be the sole means in the universe of producing protoculture. Through a combination of mistrust and arrogance, their attempts at retrieving this meet with opposition from the humans and unleash a war that leaves the Masters defeated and Earth awash in the spores of a plant called the Flower of Life—the source of protoculture and a beacon to the mysterious Invid who scour the galaxy for its presence.
- The Third Robotech War (The New Generation) begins with the arrival on Earth of the Invid, who are lured by the Flower of Life and rapidly conquer the planet. References in the previous two chapters explain to viewers that many of the heroes of the First Robotech War had left Earth to seek out the Robotech Masters on a preemptive mission, and it is this Robotech Expeditionary Force that sends missions back from across the galaxy to attempt a liberation of their homeworld. The storyline follows one group of freedom fighters as they work their way towards the final battle with the Invid.

=== Robotech: The Movie ===
Robotech: The Movie, also called Robotech: The Untold Story, is a feature film and was the first new Robotech adventure created after the premiere of the original series. It uses footage from the Megazone 23 – Part 1 animated movie, combined with scenes from "Southern Cross" and additional original animation produced for the film.

The original plan for the film was to have it set during the Macross Saga, parallel to the SDF-1's return to Earth from Pluto. The film would also have served as a prequel to the Sentinels, as both projects were initially meant to share many characters. Harmony Gold producer Carl Macek worked with the Megazone 23 creators to make the story and the new ending work. The film had to be changed again after the distributor of the film, Cannon Films, saw an incomplete rough cut of the film and were upset by it. They ordered Macek to remove multiple scenes from the film and to add more violence (most of the scenes removed were scenes setting up characters and showing female characters interacting). Macek reluctantly did what they ordered, and created a new script and rough edit for the film in less than 24 hours. When the distributors saw Macek act out the new film, they were much more pleased with the new cut. The opening night in Texas received a positive response, but Cannon Films pulled out after noting that most attendants were adults; the bulk of the scheduled advertising for the series was targeted to children. The film had limited success in Argentina and Belgium.

In 2011, A&E Home Video released, as a part of their Robotech: The Complete Series collection, a 29-minute version of Robotech: The Movie containing only footage used from "Southern Cross". There was no attempt to remaster the footage.

=== Robotech II: The Sentinels ===
This aborted American-produced series would have followed the continuing adventures of Rick and Lisa Hunter and the Robotech Expedition during the events of The Masters and The New Generation. The feature-length pilot is composed of the first three (and only) episodes that were produced. The Sentinels featured characters from all three Robotech sagas and introduced the SDF-3 along with an overview of their new mission. The series was planned to have a total of 65 episodes.

In Robotech Art 3: The Sentinels, Carl Macek blamed the cancellation of the series on the crash of the Yen/Dollar exchange rate, which caused toy partner Matchbox to withdraw from the project. Harmony Gold lacked the funds to produce the series on its own, and production ceased after only three episodes.

Robotech II: The Sentinels was released on VHS by Palladium Books. In 2011, a "remastered" version was released on the A&E DVD set, Robotech: The Complete Original Series DVD. This version has opening titles resembling those found on the "Robotech Remastered" DVDs, as well as a new ending with text explaining the fate of the SDF-3. Also, all of the flashback footage used from "The Macross Saga" has been removed, including the re-used footage from the episode "Wedding Bells".

=== Robotech: The Shadow Chronicles ===
In 2002, Tommy Yune announced development of a new animated sequel. Originally announced as a television series with a planned 2004 release date, the project was revealed at Anime Expo 2004 as a feature-length film titled Robotech: Shadow Force. The storyline overlaps with and continues from the unresolved ending of the original series. The title of the story arc was soon changed to Robotech: The Shadow Chronicles. The first trailers with finished animation were shown at Anime Expo and Comic-Con International in 2005. In February 2006, Kevin McKeever, operations coordinator at Harmony Gold, confirmed that the pilot movie had been completed. After a series of delays, FUNimation Entertainment was announced as the home video, broadcast, and theatrical distributor at the 2006 Comic-Con International in San Diego with the possibility of producing further sequels. Harmony Gold premiered the movie at various film festivals in 2006, and it was first seen by a public audience at MechaCon on August 9, 2006, where it was showcased as a charity screening to help raise funds for the ongoing Hurricane Katrina and Hurricane Rita recovery effort. A limited theatrical run followed in January 2007, and the film was released on DVD on February 6, 2007. A two-disc collector's edition was released in November 2007.

=== Robotech: Love Live Alive ===
First revealed in late 2011 in the final minutes of Carl Macek's Robotech Universe, Robotech: Love Live Alive is a documentary on the making of Robotech and is dedicated to Carl Macek, who died in April 2010. Love Live Alive is an adaptation of the 1985 Genesis Climber Mospeada OVA, Love Live Alive, and incorporates new animation. The film was released on DVD on July 23, 2013, by Lionsgate Home Entertainment in North America.

== Other television and film productions ==
=== Robotech Wars ===
This promotional VHS tape created by Matchbox was included with their Robotech Wars playset. This video includes two episodes cobbled together from clips of The Macross Saga. Titled "To the End of the Universe" and "Battle Royale", these episodes contain no new footage, and are not meant to follow any continuity established in the TV series.

=== Robotech III, Robotech IV and Robotech V ===
During the production of Robotech II: The Sentinels, Carl Macek had already begun to plot out 13 weeks of a third series title Robotech III: The Odyssey, which would have raised the total number or Robotech episodes 215 had both series been produced. He envisioned two additional series (Robotech IV and Robotech V) to bring the total number of episodes to around 300, one to air every weekday for over a year.

For Robotech III: The Odyssey, Macek stated that his plans were to create a time-travel loop, allowing the last episode of The Odyssey to lead directly into the first episode of The Macross Saga. This particular plot detail was eventually adapted into the Robotech novel The End of the Circle by Jack McKinney.

In 1986, fan publication Macross Life published an interview with Harmony Gold executive Richard Firth who first mentioned the Robotech IV and Robotech V series plans. Firth said the story would be about a retired Commodore character from The Macross Saga telling a story via flashback, but Macek later refuted that plot detail in a 2007 interview. Macek stated that while he was hoping to do up to five series, nothing was ever written for the final two.

=== Robotech 3000 ===
Macek attempted another sequel with the development of Robotech 3000. This all-CGI series would have been set a millennium in the future of the Robotech universe and feature none of the old series' characters. In the three-minute trailer, an expedition is sent to check on a non-responsive mining outpost and is attacked by "infected" Veritech mecha. The idea was abandoned midway into production after negative reception within the company, negative fan reactions at the FanimeCon anime convention in 2000, and financial difficulties within Netter Digital who was animating the show. During a 2000 San Diego Comic-Con panel, Macek announced the series was would be re-conceptualized as a traditional, hand-drawn animated series, however that idea was abandoned sometime prior to 2002 in favor of development of what would become Robotech: The Shadow Chronicles. The trailer was hosted on the official Robotech website, and was included in the 2007 release of the Robotech: The Shadow Chronicles 2-disc collector's DVD, along with behind-the-scenes motion capture footage.

=== Robotech: Mars Force ===
In October 2004, animation writer and producer Greg Weisman revealed that he developed an animated spin-off series titled Robotech: Mars Force. When asked about the project, Weisman said that he was under a non-disclosure agreement with Harmony Gold and was only allowed to mention that he developed the series.

In 2006, Harmony Gold creative director Tommy Yune elaborated on the project in the Space Station Liberty Podcast, saying that Mars Force was a series geared at younger audiences, following the children of the Robotech Expeditionary Force. A similar plot would later be used for the canceled 2014 spin-off, Robotech Academy.

=== Robotech UN Public Service Announcement ===
A sixty-second public service announcement for the 60th anniversary of the United Nations, featuring Scott Bernard and Ariel, was animated during the production of The Shadow Chronicles. Although it did not use the original voice actors and the dialogue was somewhat out-of-character, it nonetheless marked the first fully completed Robotech footage in many years.

=== Robotech: Shadow Rising ===
On July 27, 2007, at their Comic-Con International panel, Harmony Gold and Yune unveiled the second entry of the Shadow Chronicles production, titled Robotech: Shadow Rising and was to be a co-production with FUNimation Entertainment. Pre-production reportedly began in February 2007 and a projected release date of sometime in 2009 was originally expected. In 2009 Harmony Gold revealed that production had not moved forward since the summer of 2007, due to the announced development deal of a live-action film deal with Warner Bros. in September 2007.

At Comic-Con 2012, Tommy Yune announced that Love Live Alive would pave the way for Shadow Rising, and one year later announced at Anime Expo that they had resumed work on Shadow Rising.

Harmony Gold's trademark of the term "Shadow Rising" was filed in 2007, extended in 2010, but abandoned since 2011.

=== Robotech Academy ===
On July 5, 2014, Harmony Gold started a Kickstarter project for Robotech Academy, which Macek had developed before he died. The goal of this project was to raise US$500,000 to produce a new 24-minute pilot episode. The crowdfunding project was to have closed on August 9, 2014; however, on August 2, the project was canceled with a pledge level of US$194,574, or 39% of its target. Harmony Gold, however, announced that further plans to fund the project were being explored. At the 2014 Long Beach Comic Con, it was announced that the producers at Harmony Gold were in talks with at least one new media network on the prospect of producing the show. As of December 7, 2015, the project remains abandoned.

=== Unofficial and parody productions ===
In the 1990s, Seishun Shitemasu, an anime fandubbing group, produced the parodies Robotech III: Not Necessarily the Sentinels and Robotech IV: Khyron's Counterattack, using footage from, respectively, Gunbuster and Gundam: Char's Counterattack, continuing the tradition of the original Robotech's adaptation of unrelated anime series into a single continuity.

On July 2, 2010, Ecuadorian animator Patricio "Pat" Mosquera uploaded to YouTube a teaser for Robotech Skull Knights. On August 17, 2010, second teaser revealed Rick Hunter standing in front of an image of the VF-4 shown in the final episodes of the original series. Robotech Skull Knights has not been released yet. In July 2013, Patricio Mosquera was included as an animation director in the staff list in the IMDb page of Love Live Alive.

On December 31, 2012, Cesar Turturro uploaded to YouTube an Argentine fan trailer for Robotech Valkyrie Project. In December 2013 the first episode was uploaded to YouTube, and in January 2014, the second episode was also uploaded. The series was cancelled after Harmony Gold issued a "cease and desist" letter to the producers. The team was, however, hired to do the CGI effects for Robotech: Academy.

=== Proposed live-action film ===
Attempts at producing a live-action Robotech have been in development for an extended time, with numerous writers, directors, and actors attached at various times and the film rights changing between studios.

Some time prior to February 2006, the company Kickstart Entertainment (founded by Robotech: The Shadow Chronicles and Robotech 3000 producer Jason Netter) featured a graphic on their website stating that a live-action Robotech movie was in development with Chuck Russel attached to write and direct. While never formally announced by Harmony Gold, Kickstart Entertainment's announcement of this project was reported by Anime News Network on February 27, 2006. Anime News Network's article was updated on March 1, 2006, saying that this announcement had been removed.

==== Warner Bros. ====
On September 7, 2007, The Hollywood Reporter announced that Warner Bros. had acquired the film rights to Robotech, with Tobey Maguire producing and pursuing the lead role. A Harmony Gold representative stated that the company had been approached by WB and would have "a say" in the film's creative direction. Initially S. Craig Zahler was announced to be writing the script, and a revised draft of his script was completed in March 2008, loosely based on The Macross Saga. In April 2008, Harmony Gold and Warner Bros. entered into an option agreement covering Robotech: The Macross Saga and its numerous related works. Other writers would be attached to the project across the following years: Lawrence Kasdan in June 2008, Alfred Gough and Miles Millar in November 2008, Tom Rob Smith in June 2009, and Michael B. Gordon in February 2015. Nic Mathieu had been announced as director in early 2013.

==== Sony ====
On March 25, 2015, the Robotech franchise was acquired by Sony Pictures; on July 3, 2015, Harmony Gold clarified that Sony has the rights to release the film worldwide with the exception of Japan. Sony featured a sizzle reel at CinemaCon 2016 with Robotech among its upcoming slate of films, which included a very brief title card. After Harmony Gold and Big West reached an agreement which was signed on March 1, 2021, regarding to the Macross and Robotech franchises, announced on April 8, 2021, Big West officially affirmed as part of the deal that they will not take any opposition on Harmony Gold's upcoming live action adaptation of Robotech. Both Harmony Gold and Big West will cooperate on future projects for the foreseeable future.

For the Sony production, James Wan was announced in 2015 to direct a script written with Kurt Johnstad, which Harmony Gold confirmed was a complete re-write and independent from anything that was previously developed by Warner Bros. Andy Muschietti took over the project in 2017 after Wan dropped out to direct Aquaman, with Jason Fuchs writing the screenplay from scratch.

On April 27, 2022, it was reported that Hawkeye producer and director Rhys Thomas will be directing the film, with duo Art Marcum and Matt Holloway writing. In June 2023, artist Col Price posted images of concept art he was hired to create for the film. While only citing "a few years ago" as the time frame of which they were made, Price's images depict an adaptation of The Macross Saga. In June 2024, co-owner of the company In Development Ross Olivey posted to LinkedIn that the film was still in development with Sony Pictures Entertainment and its subsidiary Columbia Pictures, sharing that he had contributed pre-production work for producer Michelle Stockwell of Thomas' production company. In February 2026, Variety reported that Thomas has been tapped to direct two films for Di Bonaventura Pictures and Searchlight Pictures, describing Robotech as a project he had "previously" developed. While Harmony Gold had mentioned the live-action development deal at conventions since it was announced, their panel at WonderCon in March 2026 made no mention of the live-action production.

== Other media ==
At the time of its broadcast, Harmony Gold also launched Robotech through a popular line of comics to be followed by novels, role-playing games, toys, and other consumer products. With the cancellation of Robotech II: The Sentinels, many of these licensed products were discontinued, and led to a drought of Robotech product through much of the 1990s, except for publishers who continued The Sentinels storyline in print.

=== Art books ===
In 1986, Starblaze Graphics published Robotech Art 1, a reference book containing artwork, Japanese production designs, and episode guides from the original television series. This was followed by Robotech Art 2, which was largely a collection of art by various American artists and fans. In 1988, Carl Macek collected much of the unused designs from Robotech II: The Sentinels into Robotech Art 3: The Sentinels, which also included his story outline for the rest of the unfinished series, with an explanation behind its cancellation. In 2007, Stone Bridge Press published The Art of Robotech: The Shadow Chronicles.

=== Comics ===
Robotech comics were first published in 1984 with DC Comics' short-lived Robotech Defenders and Comico's adaptation of the first episode of the Japanese version of Macross. However, the first adaptation of the Robotech television series did not arrive until 1985 with Comico's Robotech: The Macross Saga Number 2, which continued from the first Macross issue.

The various comic publishers include:

- Comico (1984–1989)
- Eternity Comics (1988–1994)
- Academy Comics (1994–1996)
- Antarctic Press (1997–1998)
- Wildstorm (DC) (2002–2005)
- Dynamite Entertainment (2013–2015)
- Titan Comics (2017–present)

=== Collectible card game ===
The first Robotech collectible card game was released in 2006 by Hero Factory, which had previously produced Robotech trading cards.

=== Music and soundtracks ===
Various Robotech soundtracks have been released on records, cassettes, and compact discs since 1988.

- Robotech: BGM Collection, Vol.1 (1988)
- Robotech: Perfect Collection (1988)
- Robotech: Perfect Soundtrack Album (1996)
- Robotech: Battlecry Soundtrack (2002)
- Robotech: Invasion Soundtrack (2004)
- Robotech: 20th Anniversary Soundtrack (2005)
- Robotech: The Shadow Chronicles Soundtrack (2007)
- Robotech: 30th Anniversary Soundtrack (2015)

=== Novelizations ===
Since 1987, Robotech was adapted into novel form by "Jack McKinney", a pseudonym for the team of James Luceno and Brian Daley, a pair of writers who had been working with Macek since they had collaborated on the animated series Galaxy Rangers. Using fictitious epigraphs in the style of Dune, McKinney's novels fleshed out the chronology (including adapting the incomplete Sentinels source material) in far greater detail than the original animation. Many Robotech fans consider the McKinney series to be an unofficial canon of its own, despite notable divergences in the writing from Harmony Gold's current official animation-based canon. Despite no longer being considered core-continuity by Harmony Gold, the novels have been recently re-issued by Del Rey Books as Omnibus compilations.

=== Role-playing games ===
In 1986, Palladium Books published a role-playing game based on the Robotech series, including several books covering the Sentinels portion of the storyline. The original Robotech RPG line went out of print as of June 30, 2001, but Harmony Gold and Palladium Books signed an agreement in 2007 to produce a new line of Robotech RPG books, beginning with a book covering and promoting the feature-length film The Shadow Chronicles. The Robotech: The Shadow Chronicles Role-Playing Game sourcebook first book was released on March 21, 2008, followed by sourcebooks covering the Macross, Masters, and New Generation chapters of Robotech (redrafted to reflect the Harmony Gold canon). Other sourcebooks and supplements are reflected in the Palladium Books production pipeline.

On April 18, 2013, Palladium started a campaign on the crowdfunding site Kickstarter for a tabletop miniatures game based on the Robotech RPG called "Robotech: RPG Tactics". The miniatures are being produced by Ninja Division (combining sculpting talents from Soda Pop Miniatures and Cipher Studios), and will feature multi part plastic miniatures that can be posed during assembly. The campaign reached its goal in 3 hours, and was initially scheduled to release in December 2013, but delays have persisted into 2018.

In May 2019, under licensing from Harmony Gold and Strange Machine Games, Battlefield Press International produced a game book for the new Savage Worlds Adventure Edition.

=== Toys ===
Action figures in the 3.75-inch (95 mm) size of the three Robotech generations were initially released in 1985 by Matchbox toy company, but then reissued in 1992 by Harmony Gold (Lunk and Corg were only released by Matchbox and Lynn Minmei was only released by Harmony Gold). Each included a weapon and helmet where appropriate. Matchbox also released six-inch (150 mm) figures of Zentraedi characters from the first generation. These figures were supposed to represent the size difference between the Humans and the giant Zentraedi forces, but to be correct these figures would have to have been made about 20 inches (510 mm) tall. None of the larger figures came with weapons but the Armored Zentraedi came with a removable helmet.

Also many toys depicting the vehicles and mecha from the series were released by Matchbox in 1985, Harmony Gold in 1992 and Playmates Toys in 1994 (under the Exosquad line). There were major differences in packaging, toy stickers and colors between the different releases. The vehicles were designed to be used only with the 3¾-inch figures. The SDF-1 Playset was only released under the Matchbox line in the 1980s and could be used with both the 3¾- and six-inch figures.

Harmony Gold and Matchbox were unable to sell the 1/55 VF-1 Valkyrie toy originally sold in Japan by Takatoku Toys due to Hasbro licensing it as Jetfire in the Transformers toy line. Because of this, they settled with manufacturing a non-transformable Veritech Fighter that could fit any of the 3¾-inch action figures, as well as importing the transformable super deformed Veritech Fighters (originally manufactured in Japan by Bandai as Macross VF-1 Valkyrie "Joke machines").

Since the late 1990s, there has been a resurgence of Robotech-related toys. In 2001, Toynami released the Robotech Masterpiece Collection line, featuring replicas of the Veritech Fighters of The Macross Saga as well as mecha from The Macross Saga, The New Generation and The Shadow Chronicles. Companies KitzConcept and ThreeZero acquired premium articulated toy licenses in 2016 and 2021 respectively, releasing highly articulated Veritech models, as well as Zentradi mecha and 1/12 scale action figures.

=== Video games ===
Robotech spawned five video game licenses, of which the most recent three were released:

- Robotech: Crystal Dreams was a cancelled release for the Nintendo 64 game system. It was initially being developed by GameTek, but in 1997 Ocean Software purchased the rights to the game and took over as both developer and publisher. The game would have taken place during the period between the SDF-1's destruction and the launch of the SDF-3. The game had a Zentraedi invasion during what was scripted in the series as a period of peace.
- Robotech: Battlecry (2002) for the Xbox, PlayStation 2, and GameCube. The gameplay takes place in the Macross era, and features a storyline running exactly concurrent with that era's historical events. Multiplayer support is limited to one-on-one. Several of the voice actors from the original series, including Tony Oliver, Melanie MacQueen, Dan Woren, and Cam Clarke, reprised their original roles, or voiced new characters in this game. The game was a relative success, even though many fans complained of the over-cartoonified look of the game.
- Robotech: The Macross Saga (2002) for the Game Boy Advance, a side-scrolling shooter that resembles the Japanese Super Famicom game Macross: Scrambled Valkyrie.
- Robotech: Invasion (2004) for the Microsoft Xbox and the Sony PlayStation 2. First-/third-person shooter. The gameplay covers the New Generation part of the story, with support for single player missions and multiplayer online matches. Features Cyclones, transformable body armor/motorcycles. As with Battlecry, several of the original voice actors reprised their roles. Unlike Battlecry, it is not backwards compatible with the Xbox 360.
- Robotech: The New Generation (2007) for mobile phones. A top-down scrolling shooter that covers the New Generation part of the story, leading up to the Shadow Chronicles. The player can play as one of three characters (Scott, Rook and Rand), each with their own special weapons. The player also has the ability to change into "Battloid Mode" through the collection of Protoculture. Robotech: The New Generation features famous music from the TV series, as well as the most evil of all the villains.
- Robotech: The Macross Saga HD Edition (2021) for the Nintendo Switch. A remake of Robotech: The Macross Saga (2002) for the Game Boy Advance with new 3D models, dynamic lighting, enhanced effects, and high-definition backgrounds. As of March 2021, this title has only been made available on the Nintendo eShop in the Australia region.

== Reception of adaptation ==
Robotech is often a polarizing subject amongst anime fans. Some critics look down upon the show for its extensive edits to the source material (Westernizing character names, editing for content and chiefly, forging a connection between previously unrelated series), while supporters of the adaptation have pointed out that the weaving of three unrelated series into a contiguous whole necessarily required reworking, and that it helped to maintain a slow but continuous rise in the consumption of anime in the US.

Series writer/actor Gregory Snegoff said in an interview on the now-defunct Shadow Chronicles News fansite that, "afterward, we received compliments from the Japanese who thought our dialogue and stories were better than the original," likely a reference to the creators of the latter two series, both of whom worked with the team on The Sentinels. The producers of Megazone 23 – Part 1 were very happy with the original plans for Robotech: The Movie (where the incomplete film would have been added to the Robotech mythos to play part in The Sentinels storyline), and worked closely with Carl Macek to plan the new ending and animation. When the film reached a limited release, the new ending was released on a LaserDisc of Megazone 23, with the title "Present For You." However, Animag magazine (issue 11) and Animerica magazine (issue 9, volume 4) reports that the staff of Macross at Studio Nue and Artland, such as the original story creator and mecha designer Shōji Kawamori and chief director Noboru Ishiguro, expressed their concern over the Robotech adaptation, and surprise at its differences.

In 2009, IGN ranked Robotech as the 34th-greatest animated show of all time in their Top 100 list.

In a review of The Macross Saga for NEO, David West considered it a landmark in Japanese animation and an essential watch for fans of the mecha genre. He considered its take on human issues such as love and death to be fresh and enduring, and although he found the animation to be not as up to date as the story, he considers the show impressive despite its age.

== Distribution ==
Following the original broadcast, the series enjoyed popularity on home video in VHS and DVD formats from the following distributors:

- Family Home Entertainment (VHS, LaserDisc) (First six-tape run of The Macross Saga was heavily edited, with roughly 38 minutes of footage cut from each six-episode tape. The episode "Private Time" was almost entirely removed, with only a few minutes of the beginning and end being shown.)
- Palladium Books (VHS)
- Streamline Pictures (VHS, LaserDisc)
- ADV Films (DVD Region 1 – North America) (original broadcast version and first printing of the remastered version)
- A&E Networks Home Entertainment (DVD Region 1 – North America)
- Manga Entertainment (DVD Region 2 & Blu-ray Region B – UK) (ADV first print of the remastered version for DVD & Funimation print of the Blu-ray version)
- Madman Entertainment (DVD Region 4 – Australia)
- Funimation (DVD Region 1 & Blu-ray Region A – USA) (Robotech: The Shadow Chronicles) (first print, later re-released by A&E Entertainment, but has reverted to Funimation in October 2019 following the announcement which also includes the Robotech series and Robotech II: The Sentinels)
- Crunchyroll (Blu-ray Region A – North America) (Blu-ray version of the show; Funimation rebranded as Crunchyroll not long after this release)
- Revelation Films (DVD Region 2 – UK) (Robotech: The Shadow Chronicles and Love Live Alive)
- Go Entertainment (DVD Region 2 – UK) (Region 2 version of A&E's box set)
- Beyond Home Entertainment (DVD Region 4 – Australia) (Region 4 version of A&E's Boxset)
- Guangdong Qianhe Audio & Video (DVD Region 6 – China) (Robotech: The Shadow Chronicles)
