= Prime Directive (role-playing game) =

Tabletop role-playing game

- First edition cover
- Designers: Mark Costello (1st edition); Timothy D. Olsen (1st edition); Gary Plana (GURPS); Jonathan Thompson (PD20)
- Publishers: Amarillo Design Bureau Inc, (formerly)Task Force Games
- Publication: 1993 (1st edition); 2002 (GURPS edition); 2005 (D20 edition); 2008 (D20M edition)
- Genres: Science fiction (Star Trek)
- Systems: Custom, GURPS, D20, D20M, Traveller

Prime Directive is a role-playing game set in the Star Trek-derived Star Fleet Universe. The setting was published with four different rule sets from 1993 to 2008.

== Prime Directive RPG 1993 ==
The original release of Prime Directive was published by Task Force Games in 1993. Using an in-house design by Mark Costello and Timothy D. Olsen, it used a D6-style system similar to Shadowrun and Star Wars. Aspects of the game include a multi-tiered task resolution system, where characters can achieve 'Complete', 'Moderate', 'Minimal', 'Failure' or 'Botch' levels of success with their actions, and the Character Reputation and Background system that allows characters to “spontaneously” develop skills, abilities, and prior associations appropriate to the mission at hand.

The published books for the game included the core rulebook, a Federation sourcebook. and a few adventure books.

== GURPS Prime Directive 2002 ==
After Task Force Games closed and the cancellation of the original Prime Directive line, Amarillo Design Bureau, Inc., the new publishers of Star Fleet Universe games, were left with the question of what to do with Prime Directive. They were primarily a wargame company, and the poor sales of the supplements were cause for a reexamination. Eventually, they approached Steve Jackson Games to licence Powered by GURPS.

== D20 and D20M Prime Directive ==
The core rulebook, D20 Klingons, D20 Romulans (no D20M as of Aug 2011), and D20 Federation are available for this system.

== Reception ==
Chris McCubbin reviewed the first version of Prime Directive for Pyramid #7 (May 1994) and stated that "My advice to Star Trek fans interested in Prime Directive is to play it, but play it on its own terms, as a good, solid outer space military adventure, without trying to squeeze it into the TV show's mold in every tiny detail. To tell you the truth, the universe of Prime Directive is much more playable than the Star Trek universe anyway, while preserving most of the elements that got trekkies interested in Star Trek in the first place."

Jason Fryer reviewed the first version in White Wolf #48 (Oct., 1994), rating it a 4 out of 5 and stated that "The price is more than fair, and with its sample adventures, Prime Directive provides you with everything you need to run the game."

== Reviews ==
- Valkyrie #1 (Sept., 1994)
