= Robotech: The New Generation =

2007 video game

- Developer: Big Blue Bubble
- Publisher: Airborne Entertainment
- Platform: mobile phones
- Release: May 7, 2007
- Genre: Scrolling shooter
- Mode: Single-player

Robotech: The New Generation is a mobile video game developed by Big Blue Bubble and released by Airborne Entertainment for mobile phones.

== Overview ==
Robotech: The New Generation is a top down scrolling shooter. The gameplay covers the story segment of the Third Robotech War in the 1985 animated series over 20 levels, five environments and three playable Veritech Alpha Fighters.

The game received an editor's award from Wireless Gaming World. It was first available from AT&T Cingular on May 7, 2007 and Verizon Wireless in October 2007.
