= Robotech (novels) =

Book series

- Author: Jack McKinney, Brian Daley
- Country: United States
- Language: English
- Genre: Science fiction, Young adult fiction, Mystery, Thriller
- Publisher: Del Rey Books
- Media type: Print (hardcover and paperback); Audiobook

In 1987, the Robotech animated series was adapted into novel form by authors James Luceno and Brian Daley and published by Del Rey Books. Having previously collaborated on the animated series Galaxy Rangers, the pair released the Robotech novels under the unified pseudonym of "Jack McKinney". Using fictitious epigraphs in the style of Dune, McKinney's novels escaped the limitations inherent in the dubbed cartoon and fleshed out its chronology in greater detail; most significantly, by adapting the storyline of the aborted sequel project, "The Sentinels". The entire series lasted for twenty-one books, the first fifteen of which were later collected into five three-book omnibus compilations in the early 1990s.

The original twelve novels were written to a tight twelve-month deadline, so that the books could be released one per month. Under this deadline, Daley and Luceno divided the Robotech timeline into twelve segments and worked on different segments simultaneously (i.e. Daley wrote Book 1 while Luceno wrote Book 2), then traded completed manuscripts for revision and style adjustments. As part of the research project, they watched the TV series many times, and consulted heavily with Carl Macek.

The first two omnibus collections, comprising the entirety of the "Macross Saga", were reissued in 2003 to tie in with the release of the Robotech: Battlecry video game. Then, in 2007, the next two omnibus collections, covering the remainder of the television series, were re-released as tie-ins to the animated movie, Robotech: The Shadow Chronicles. However, a revision of the Robotech timeline made by Harmony Gold alongside the release of the movie caused some continuity clashes with the McKinney novels, which were relegated to a "secondary" position in Robotech canon. To work around this, the Southern Cross and Invid Invasion collections contain new appendices written by Robotech fan Jonathan L. Switzer correcting any newborn mistakes.

== Divergences ==
The major divergences from the Robotech television series include:

- Additional properties are attributed to Protoculture. More than a component of a power source and a hallucinogenic foodstuff for genetic engineering, it is later discovered to also be a mystical force akin to the Force in Star Wars, that, through its "Shapings," manipulated the destiny of the universe, and provides the basis for a link between mind and mecha the use of Robotechnology (a product of technology powered by protoculture matrix energy) enables.
- Stating that Robotech's mecha are partially controlled by the pilot's mental imaging via a "thinking cap" (a la Firefox or the later Macross spin-off Macross Plus), in addition to the joysticks and pedals seen in the show.
- Using a chronology that slightly contradicts the cartoon itself, chiefly by placing the Second Robotech War seventeen years after the first, instead of fifteen. The above-mentioned 21st century reboot of the timeline created further disparities; McKinney had Scott Bernard entering the Third Robotech War in 2034 and the conflict ending in 2035, by the new timeline has him enter in 2042, and the war end in 2044. Further, the novels have the SDF-3 launching in 2020 (and the REF's arrival in Tirol takes five years in real time, leading the force to assume it's still 2020 in their calendars), where the revised timeline follows through with the original intent of the unproduced cartoon by placing it in 2022.

The divergences can be explained partly by a lack of translated source material from the original shows—meaning that the writers could only go by what was seen on the screen and the materials they had been given—and partly by a desire to tie the series together even more completely than the television show, sometimes by including material that never ended up being animated. In particular, the "Shapings of the Protoculture" enabled this unification, serving as the deus ex machina to Robotech's Greek tragedy. At least some of the elements for which the novels have been criticized were directly suggested by Carl Macek during Daley and Luceno's consultations with him.

== Bibliography ==
The following is the list of novels released by Del Rey in publishing order, Omnibus Editions and a rough chronological story order, except that the events in books #13–17 (The Sentinels) are actually concurrent with books #7–12:

Individual editions
1. Genesis
2. Battle Cry
3. Homecoming
4. Battle Hymn
5. Force of Arms
6. Doomsday
7. Southern Cross
8. Metal Fire
9. The Final Nightmare
10. Invid Invasion
11. Metamorphosis
12. Symphony of Light
13. The Devil's Hand (The Sentinels)
14. Dark Powers (The Sentinels)
15. Death Dance (The Sentinels)
16. World Killers (The Sentinels)
17. Rubicon (The Sentinels)
18. The End of the Circle
19. The Zentraedi Rebellion
20. The Masters' Gambit
21. Before the Invid Storm
Omnibus Collected editions
- The Macross Saga: Battlecry (#1–3)
- The Macross Saga: Doomsday (#4–6)
- The Masters Saga: The Southern Cross (#7–9)
- The New Generation: The Invid Invasion (#10–12)
- The Sentinels 3-in-1 (#13–15)
Chronological story order
- 01. Genesis
- 02. Battle Cry
- 03. Homecoming
- 04. Battle Hymn
- 05. Force of Arms
- 06. Doomsday
- 19. The Zentraedi Rebellion
- 13. The Devil's Hand (The Sentinels)
- 14. Dark Powers (The Sentinels)
- 15. Death Dance (The Sentinels)
- 16. World Killers (The Sentinels)
- 17. Rubicon (The Sentinels) *
- 20. The Masters' Gambit
- 07. Southern Cross
- 08. Metal Fire
- 09. The Final Nightmare
- 21. Before the Invid Storm
- 10. Invid Invasion
- 11. Metamorphosis
- 12. Symphony of Light
- 18. The End of the Circle

* - The last two chapters of Rubicon reference events taking place after Before the Invid Storm

Books #1–12 novelize the story of the TV series; Books #1–6 cover the story of The Macross Saga (at the time known simply as the "First Generation"); The Masters (the "Second Generation") is covered in Books #7–9; and finally, New Generation ("Third Generation") is adapted in Books #10–12. Books #13–17 document the story of the aborted sequel TV series, The Sentinels.

Book #18 is unique as it is set after the events of the final episode of Robotech and wraps up all of the outstanding plotlines and questions that remained after the series ended. Published in 1989, this book was considered to be the final chapter of the Robotech series until the 2006 release of Robotech: The Shadow Chronicles, which introduced a radically-alternate storyline.

The last three books were published from 1994–1996. Collectively labelled the "Lost Generation," they take place in the assorted "gaps" in the timeline; Book #19 takes place between the end of the First Generation and the start of The Sentinels, incorporating an adaptation of the Eternity Comic series The Malcontent Uprisings; Book #20 is set following the beginning of The Sentinels, but before the start of the Second Generation, incorporating elements from the plots of Robotech: The Movie and Eternity Comics' CyberPirates; and the final book, #21, occurs during the period between the Second and Third Generations and details the Invid-invasion of Earth.
