= Robotech Collectible Card Game =

Card game published by Hero Factory

- Designers: J. Takenaka / E. Reyes
- Publishers: Hero Factory
- Players: 2
- Playing time: Approx 20 minutes
- Chance: Some
- Age range: 10+
- Skills: Card playing Arithmetic; Basic Reading Ability

The Robotech Collectible Card Game (CCG) is an out-of-print collectible card game produced by Hero Factory that is set against the science fiction backdrop of Robotech. Cards are based on characters and mecha from this popular anime. After a limited public beta testing period, the game debuted at Anime Expo in 2006.

== Gameplay ==
In the Robotech CCG, players battle against each other in a race to accumulate battle points. The first player who accumulates 25 battle points, either through directly attacking an opponent's base zone, or through destruction of enemy units, wins the game.

The basic game mechanics are similar to older games such as Magic: The Gathering, although with several differences. For example, attacks may be declared not only directly against an opponent (in this case, the base zone), but also against an opponent's units. This leads to concepts such as intercept defense, where fast units can intercept attacks made against individual units. Another gameplay element is that of transforming, where certain cards can change their configuration during play (much as the mecha do in the anime).

== Card types and decks ==
There are three basic card types in the Robotech CCG:

- Character cards represent the people and heroic individuals of the Robotech universe.
- Mecha cards depict fighting machines of various types, including Veritech fighters.
- Action cards represent events or actions occurring during battles, such as a unit making an evasive maneuver.
- Vessel cards were introduced in the Azonia expansion deck.
- Location cards were introduced in the Robotech Masters expansion deck.

Each player's deck must contain at least 50 cards, and may not contain more than three of any one card which does not have the keyword "Basic" (which represents non-unique assets available in any quantity). The following expansion decks have been released:

- Azonia deck
- Blue Squadron (Max Sterling) deck
- Breetai deck
- SDF-1 deck
- Robotech Masters deck
- The New Generation deck

A "Beta" deck was also publicly released and can be distinguished by its square corners, which are not rounded like the standard issue cards.
