= Walter Neugebauer =

- Born: 28 March 1921 Tuzla, Kingdom of Serbs Croats and Slovenes (today Bosnia and Herzegovina)
- Died: 31 May 1992 (aged 71) Geretsried, Germany
- Areas: Writer, Artist
- Pseudonym: Valter Nojgebauer

Walter Neugebauer (sometimes Slavicized as Valter Nojgebauer; 28 March 1921 – 31 May 1992) was a Croatian comic book artist and animator. Neugebauer is considered one of the founders of comics in Croatia, along with Andrija Maurović.

== Biography ==
Neugebauer debuted his first strip in the Zagreb review Oko in October 1935. In 1943, Walter and his brother Norbert launched the weekly comic Zabavnik, which was published for two years before being banned by the new communist government in May 1945. In 1945, Neugebauer was creating an illustrated version of Brother Jaglenac and Sister Rutvica from Ivana Brlić-Mažuranić's Croatian Tales of Long Ago which was never completed.

Later he worked in West Germany for Fix and Foxi.
