= Robotech: The Movie =

1986 film by Noboru Ishiguro and Carl Macek

- Film poster
- Directed by: Noboru Ishiguro; Carl Macek
- Screenplay by: Ardwight Chamberlain
- Story by: Carl Macek
- Produced by: Ahmed Agrama; Toru Miura
- Starring: Kerrigan Mahan; Iona Morris; Jo Ann Harris; Gregory Snegoff
- Cinematography: Yoshizaki Kenichi
- Edited by: Jonathon Braun; Nishide Eiko
- Music by: Ulpio Minucci; Arlon Ober
- Production companies: Harmony Gold USA; Tatsunoko Production; The Idol Company; Uncredited: Artmic; Artland
- Distributed by: The Cannon Group
- Release date: 25 July 1986 (Limited test run)
- Running time: 82 minutes 29 minutes (A&E edited version)
- Countries: United States; Japan
- Language: English
- Budget: $8 million

Robotech: The Movie, also known as Robotech: The Untold Story, is a 1986 American-Japanese science fiction animated film directed by Noboru Ishiguro and Carl Macek. Part of the Robotech franchise, the film is set between the events of The Macross Saga and The Masters from the original 1985 series. It follows Mark Landry, a young man who becomes involved a conflict between Earth and the invading Robotech Masters when he discovers the Masters have infiltrated Earth's military.

The film was created using footage from the 1985 movie Megazone 23 Part I and the 1984 series Super Dimension Cavalry Southern Cross. Commissioned by Cannon Films, Macek intended the film to be an English dub of Megazone 23 that would have elements from the Robotech series. After Cannon objected to Macek's plans, the Megazone 23 footage was combined with scenes from Southern Cross, which were previously used for The Masters. Original animation was also created for the film's ending.

Cannon gave Robotech: The Movie a limited theatrical run in the United States. Internationally, the film was distributed theatrically and on home media by Harmony Gold. No longer part of the Robotech continuity, the film is now out of print.

== Plot ==
In the year 1999, the alien spacecraft SDF-1 crashed on Earth, followed ten years later by the alien Zentraedi, seeking to reclaim the vessel for their rulers, the Robotech Masters. The First Robotech War erupted over the vessel, ending with victory for humankind, at the cost of the SDF-1 itself. Now, in 2027, the Robotech Masters themselves arrive in Earth's Solar System, aiming to recover the ship's still-functional mother computer, being studied at Earth's Robotech Research Center in Japan. The Masters launch a covert attack on a small human settlement, killing Colonel B.D. Andrews of the Army of the Southern Cross and secretly replacing him with a clone. Following a disastrous attack by the ASC on the Masters' flagship, the Andrews clone proposes that the military take charge of the mother computer and use it to formulate a defense against the Masters. When his proposal is approved, he secretly begins beaming the contents of the computer's database to the Masters, after which they plan to destroy the Earth.

Suspicious over the military's decision to hide the Masters' existence from the populous, soldier Todd Harris steals the "MODAT 5" – a mobile terminal remotely connected to the mother computer in the form of a motorcycle – and seeks help from his friend Mark Landry, telling him to contact "Eve". Troops under the Andrews clone's command accost the pair, and Todd dies in an escape attempt before he can fully explain everything to Mark. Mark manages to escape with the MODAT 5, but unaware of its true significance, winds up merely using it as a prop in an amateur movie being shot by Kelly, a friend of his girlfriend, aspiring dancer Becky Michaels.

Seeing a music video from popular idol Eve, Mark presumes that she was who Todd wanted to contact and telephones her talk show to tell her about the MODAT. The call is traced by Andrews's men, leading to a freeway chase during which the bike automatically reconfigures into a humanoid mecha form to fend off Mark's attackers. Mark proceeds to sneak into the TV studio from which Eve's show is broadcast and discovers that the singer is not a real person at all, but a holographic projection. Eve explains that she is the artificial intelligence of the SDF-1's computer, and informs Mark of the Masters' plan. Eve leads Mark to the Robotech Research Center, where Mark engages and defeats "Andrews" in a mecha battle, but accidentally lets slip the existence of Kelly's film footage of the MODAT. Escaping, Mark attempts to warn Becky, but his recent distractedness has alienated her, and it is not until he rescues her from being sexually assaulted by an unscrupulous dance show director that the pair reconcile.

ASC forces under the command of Rolf Emerson stage another attack on the Masters' fleet, and again meet with failure thanks to Andrews using the mother computer to feed them bad data and control their movements. When a concerned technician reports Andrews's suspicious actions to Professor Embry, head of the Ministry of Computer Sciences, the computer is ordered to be shut down. Andrews stages a coup and takes control of the Japanese government, ordering the computer reactivated and the transmission of its database resumed. Amid the chaos of the coup, Kelly is killed by Andrews' men and her film of the MODAT is stolen. Realizing the threat Andrews poses, Embry prepares to depart for Alaska Base, location of a secondary terminal that will allow him to take control of the computer, but is delayed by waiting for his daughter Stacy – Kelly's roommate – to join him.

The Masters' flagship descends to Earth and they deliver an ultimatum to the ASC, but in doing so, reveal the link between the computer and their vessel. Exploiting the link to discern a weak spot in the Masters' defenses, the ASC is able to cripple their flagship, and when it crashes, the rest of the fleet retreats. Simultaneously, Mark, seeking revenge, attacks the research center to flush out Andrews. Defeated and left for dead by Andrews, who departs to intercept Embry, Mark is contacted through the wrecked MODAT by Eve, who directs him to commandeer a prototype space fighter that carries him to the airport just in time to save Embry and Stacy from Andrews' attack. Transforming the space fighter to robot mode, Mark has one final battle with Andrews that ends with him killing the clone and triumphantly reuniting with Becky.

== Cast ==
- Kerrigan Mahan as Mark Landry
- Iona Morris as Becky Michaels
- Jo Ann Harris as Eve
- Gregory Snegoff as Colonel B.D. Andrews
- Michael McConnohie as Rolf Emerson
- Greg Finley as Anatole Leonard
- Tom Wyner as Robotech Master
- Robert V. Barron as Professor Embry
- Edie Mirman as Kelly Stevens
- Wendee Lee as Stacy Embry

Additional voices are provided by Tony Clay, Clifton Wells, Bruce Winant, Doug Lee, Dan Woren, Richard Epcar, Barry Stigler, Dave Mallow, Frank Catalano, Bill Capizzi, Milton James, Steve Kramer, Max Christian, and Mike Reynolds. Ardwight Chamberlain and Cam Clarke also provide additional voices in uncredited roles. An uncredited J. Jay Smith reprises his role as the narrator from the Robotech series.

== Production ==
When Cannon Films approached Harmony Gold about releasing a Robotech movie, director/producer/co-writer Carl Macek suggested licensing the film Macross: Do You Remember Love?, but Harmony Gold was unable to do so over "political reasons" that Macek was not fully unaware of. An edited version Macross: Do you Remember Love? titled Clash of the Bionoids had already been licensed by Toho International to the US distributor Peregrine Film Distribution, Inc. in 1986. According to Macek, Cannon Films also wanted the film to be an original story and not a rehash of anything done in the series prior.

Eventually, Megazone 23 —a 1985 theatrical anime movie produced by Artmic and Artland— became the basis for the Robotech film. With the Megazone 23 license secured, the project had originally been intended to be more of a straight dub of with dialogue and music changes to reflect the Robotech universe. As originally conceived, it would have been set concurrently with the events of the first portion of the Robotech television series (while the SDF-1 was in the process of journeying back to Earth from Pluto) with the protagonist Mark Landry, a relative of TV series lead character Rick Hunter, finding out about the government's coverup of the SDF-1's fate, and Landry fighting to make the information known. The final shot in the film was intended to be the sequence from episode 13 of Robotech with the SDF-1 finally landing on Earth.

Cannon Films felt there were "too many girls and not enough robots and guns", and did not like Megazone's downer ending, either. Thus, Macek rewrote the story to take place in the time-gap between the first and second seasons of the television series, cut segments of Southern Cross footage into it, and commissioned animation studio The Idol Company to animate a new ending (which was later included on the laserdisc of Megazone 23, Part II under the name "Present For You" and on the "Over Seas Edition" bonus DVD of the PlayStation 3 game; Megazone 23: Aoi Garland, along with the unreleased Harmony Gold dub of Part II). The new version involved the Robotech Masters kidnapping and replicating veteran officer B.D. Andrews to steal the memory core of the SDF-1.

Because Megazone 23 (a movie) and Southern Cross (a TV series) were shot on different film stock, 35mm and 16mm respectively, the visual inconsistency was very noticeable on the big screen.

It was originally intended for the B.D. Andrews character—named "B.D. Edwards" in the original cut—to go on to appear in the sequel animated television series, Robotech II: The Sentinels, which was in the planning stages at the time. However, this became impossible when the film was recut and time frame of the story changed, as Edwards's presence in the new version would have conflicted with his role in The Sentinels. To that end, the character in the film was changed into "B.D. Andrews" and the Sentinels character became "T. R. Edwards." Similarly, Eve was also intended to appear in The Sentinels, but for the same continuity reason, was reworked to become Janice Em.

== Music ==
The Robotech: The Movie soundtrack album by Ulpio Minucci, Arlon Ober and various artists was released only in France and Latin America in 1987. The various records, cassettes and discs of this soundtrack are now considered collector's items. Michael Bradley's single "Underground" was also released separately by Carrere Records.

== Release and marketing ==
=== U.S. test run ===
Cannon Films released Robotech: The Movie on July 25, 1986, in Texas, on a test-run basis; the launch involved 25 theaters in the Dallas-Fort Worth area. The marketing for the film was primarily targeted at younger audiences, airing on television during children's shows, and theaters booked primarily matinee shows to accommodate this younger demographic. According to Macek, Cannon looked at the tickets sales and saw adult tickets, sold to those typically age 12 and above, were much higher than the studio expected. One Harmony Gold employee claimed that while seeing the film in Texas, they saw a mother run out of the theater with her young child when realizing how violent it was.

Realizing that the film was going to appeal to an older audience, Cannon Films delayed the release in the rest of the United States to re-work their marketing plans. According to Macek, that delay became indefinite until Cannon Films dropped release plans for the film altogether.

While the film never saw a wide release, it remained in Cannon's film library for a few years which allowed theaters to exhibit it if they chose to. The film ended up being screened on various college campuses, at select theaters for special engagements, and at festivals such as 1987's Animation Celebration in Pasadena, California.

While Cannon had the distribution rights to the film domestically in the United States, Harmony Gold had distribution rights internationally and were able to license it to distributors in other territories including Argentina and Belgium. It saw a theatrical run, and had home video releases including in the United Kingdom from Rank Home Video, a Spanish dub from International Video Entertainment and version subtitles in Dutch from Vestron Video. Harmony Gold eventually relinquished its license to Megazone 23 after director Carl Macek washed his hands of the project, making these international VHS tapes and LaserDiscs now considered very rare.

Some animatics and other supplemental material were released as extras with ADV Films' Robotech Legacy DVD release.

In 2011, A&E Home video released, as part of their Robotech: The Complete Series collection, a 29-minute version of Robotech: The Movie. This version contains only footage used from Southern Cross, with a disclaimer stating the film "has been edited for licensing and content." The plot focuses mainly on the battles between The Robotech Masters and the Army of The Southern Cross, with the main plot seen in the Megazone 23 footage being referred to mostly through dialogue. This version does, however, retain the original end credits of the film, crediting many characters and songs that never appear in it.

=== Current status ===
After ADV Films acquired the home video rights to Megazone 23, some fans anticipated a home-video release of Robotech: The Movie. However, neither ADV nor any other distributor (including the owners of the Cannon Films library, Metro-Goldwyn-Mayer) has announced plans for a DVD or Blu-ray release of the film. Any potential release of the movie is considered extremely unlikely since the film's original negatives were destroyed in a flood of the studio in the mid-1990s; and a release based on available copies of the movie would likely be of very low quality. However, blackmarket copies of the movie have reportedly made their way onto the Internet due to file sharing, along with fan-made edits that have restored the film using Blu-ray and DVD transfers of the original source material released commercially. The events of the film are no longer considered part of the official Robotech timeline.

=== Comic and novel adaptations ===
- Academy Comics released a comic adaptation of the movie in 1996 written by Benny R. Powell with art by Chia-Chi Wang. The book was a departure from the actual movie, at the request of the publisher. While the first issue borrowed heavily from the source material, the second issue was almost entirely new material. The two-issue series was originally intended to be a longer run, but due to the loss of the license to Antarctic Press, it was vastly condensed. It was among the last Robotech comics published by Academy before the license was moved to Antarctic Press. In 2004, Harmony Gold listed this comic series on the official Robotech bibliography on Robotech.com, however the covers were pixelated due to no longer having rights to the Megazone 23 imagery.
- Additionally, elements from the movie were used in the plot of the Robotech novel #20: The Masters' Gambit.

== Reception ==
In its limited U.S. run, Robotech: The Movie received mixed-to-positive reviews. Michael H. Price of the Fort Worth Star-Telegram gave it a score of 7/10, praising the animation quality and music; The Mesquite News commented likewise and found it reminiscent of Star Wars; and the Dayton Daily News' Terry Lawson remarked that it would appeal more to fans of the parent series than nonconverts. In a 2019 retrospective article, FilmInquiry's Mark McPherson said, "There's little reason to seek out the film past being a Robotech completionist, considering how much better Megazone 23 looks when not filtered through Robotech Americanization."
