= Robotech: Invasion =

2004 video game

- Developer: Vicious Cycle Software
- Publisher: Global Star Software
- Director: Marc Racine
- Producer: Rodney W. Harper
- Designer: Matt Greig
- Programmer: Wayne Harvey
- Composer: Jesper Kyd
- Platforms: PS2, Xbox
- Release: NA: October 5, 2004; AU: November 19, 2004; EU: January 14, 2005 (Xbox); EU: February 4, 2005 (PS2)
- Genre: First-person shooter
- Modes: Single player, multiplayer

Robotech: Invasion is a 2004 first-person shooter video game set in the Invid Invasion era of the Robotech saga, itself based in the Japanese anime series Genesis Climber Mospeada. Developed by Vicious Cycle Software and published by Global Star (following parent company Take-Two Interactive's acquisition of TDK Mediactive, which published Robotech: Battlecry).

== Overview ==
The game starts out with the Robotech Expeditionary Force returning to Earth and fighting the Invid Forces. One of the ships crashes on Earth and the crew begins fighting the Invid close to one of their hives. One member of the crew (the main character) makes a mad dash on foot to assault the hive but is knocked out by an Invid Trooper.

Four years pass and humanity is still fighting the Invid. The member that was knocked out wakes up with no memory in the rear of a truck being driven by soldiers, he then dons the name Locke by taking the armor of a fallen soldier that went by that name. Then meets up with squad leader, Silas and his partner Arturo. With the squad low on ammo, Locke looks for Sam, a member that is guarding protoculture ammo reserves. After Locke needs his cyclone repaired he meets Guppy, who repairs his cyclone and tells him to meet her in a Town called Greystone. Soon after they find an abandoned ship and replenish their equipment. Finally (and after various skirmishes with the Invid and other hostile humans) they head on to Reflex Point, where the final attack on the Invid Invaders is set to take place at the end of the game.

== Development ==
The second Robotech game produced by Vicious Cycle focuses on the universe as depicted in Robotech: The New Generation series. Instead of the distinctive, cell-shaded style of Battlecry, Invasion has a 3D textured graphic look. As with Robotech: Battlecry, Invasion used a number of the original Robotech voice cast to reprise their old roles for cameos and voice many of the new characters introduced in the game.

During production of the Robotech game several unused mecha and armor designs from the original Japanese series, which can be found in an artbook called The Imai Files, were used or served as inspiration for new designs.

Due to lower than expected sales of Robotech: Battlecry on the GameCube, Vicious Cycle chose to only develop the game for the PlayStation 2 and Xbox. It was also decided to release a single version, instead of both a normal and a bonus-packed Collectors Edition like those seen with Robotech: Battlecry. Ultimately sales of Invasion were much lower than Robotech: Battlecry.

The musical score of Invasion was composed by Jesper Kyd. Like Battlecry, Invasion's soundtrack was released on audio CD, though available separately and not as part of a Collector's Edition.

Much like Robotech: Battlecry made an official design out of a slight variation in the VF-1R Veritech, Invasion made use of two formerly unofficial designs, the Devastator and the fan-created Shadow Dancer.

== The fate of Jack Archer ==
Thanks to the open ended nature of the end of the Robotech: Battlecry game, the fate and future of main character Jack Archer was unclear. Vicious Cycle inserted a hidden Easter egg that shows a message spray painted as if it were graffiti, saying "Jack Archer lives", but the player does not discover what exactly happens to him.

== Reception ==
Reception

Aggregate score
| Aggregator | Score | |
| Aggregator | PS2 | Xbox |
|---|---|---|
| Metacritic | 57/100 | 59/100 |

Review scores
| Publication | Score | |
| Publication | PS2 | Xbox |
|---|---|---|
| 1Up.com | C | C |
| Electronic Gaming Monthly | 5.67/10 | 5.67/10 |
| Game Informer | 6.5/10 | 6.5/10 |
| GamePro | 1.5/5 | 2/5 |
| GameSpot | 6.3/10 | 6.3/10 |
| GameSpy | 3/5 | 2.5/5 |
| GameZone | N/A | 7.2/10 |
| IGN | 7.4/10 | 7.4/10 |
| Official U.S. PlayStation Magazine | 3/5 | N/A |
| Official Xbox Magazine (US) | N/A | 5.9/10 |

Compared to Robotech: Battlecry, Robotech: Invasion was a critical disappointment, receiving "mixed" reviews on both platforms according to the review aggregation website Metacritic. Electronic Gaming Monthly called it "pretty dull, even for a first-person shooter." GameSpot said, "the game's single-player campaign still suffers from the same bland gameplay and mission design that plagued its predecessor."
