= Kumiko =

- Gender: Female

Origin
- Origin: Japanese
- Meaning: many different meanings depending on the kanji used.

Other names
- Related names: Kumi

Kumiko (Japanese: くみこ, クミコ) is a feminine Japanese given name.

== Written forms ==
Kumiko can be written using different kanji and can mean:

- 久美子, "forever, beauty, child"
- 空見子, "sky, see, child"
- 公美子, "public, beauty, child"
- 來未子, "come, not, child"
- 功美子, "success, beauty child"

The name can also be written in hiragana or katakana.

== People ==
- Kumiko Aihara (相原 久美子; born 1947), Japanese politician
- Kumiko Akiyoshi (秋吉 久美子; born 1954), Japanese actress
- Kumiko Asō (麻生 久美子; born 1978), Japanese actress
- Kumiko Goto (後藤 久美子; born 1974), Japanese actress, model, and former singer
- Kumiko Goto-Azuma, Antarctic palaeoclimatologist and glaciologist
- Kumiko Haba (羽場 久美子; born 1952), Japanese Professor of International Politics
- Kumiko Hayakawa (早川 久美子; born 1971), Japanese politician
- Kumiko Hayashi (林 久美子; born 1972), Japanese politician
- Kumiko Higa (比嘉 久美子; born 1978), Japanese voice actress
- Kumiko Iijima (飯島 久美子; born 1982), Japanese former tennis player
- Kumiko Ikeda (井村 久美子; born 1981), Japanese long jumper
- Kumiko Kashiwagi (柏木 久美子; born 1978), Japanese alpine skier
- Kumiko Koishi (小石 公美子; born 1995), Japanese former idol of the idol group SKE48
- Kumiko Koiwai (小岩井 久美子; born 1975), Japanese former competitive figure skater
- Kumiko Nagasawa (長沢 久美子; born 1960), Japanese guitarist of the idol trio Sugar (trio)
- Kumiko Nakano (中野 公美子; born 1977), Japanese idol and actress
- Kumiko Nishihara (西原 久美子; born 1965), Japanese voice actress
- Kumiko Nishioka (西岡 久美子; born 1954), Japanese mathematician
- Kumiko Ōba (大場 久美子; born 1960), Japanese actress, singer, and psychological counselor
- Kumiko Ogihara Japanese male curler and coach
- Kumiko Ogura (小椋 久美子; born 1983), Japanese badminton player
- Kumiko Okada (岡田 久美子; born 1991), Japanese racewalker
- Kumiko Okae (岡江 久美子; 1956–2020), Japanese actress, voice actress, and television presenter
- Kumiko Okamoto (岡本 久美子; born 1965), Japanese retired female tennis player
- Kumiko Omura (大村 久美子; born 1970), Japanese composer
- Kumiko Ōsugi (大杉 久美子; born 1951), Japanese J-pop artist
- Kumiko Sakino (先野 久美子; born 1975), Japanese retired volleyball player
- Kumiko Sato (佐藤 久美子; born 1946), Japanese figure skating coach and former competitor
- Kumiko Serizawa (1928–2021), Japanese American master doll-maker
- Kumiko Takahashi (animator) (高橋 久美子; born 1962), Japanese animator and character designer
- Kumiko Takahashi (singer) (高橋 久美子; born 1954), Japanese singer
- Kumiko Takahashi (writer) (高橋 久美子; born 1982), Japanese writer
- Kumiko Takeda (武田 久美子; born 1968), Japanese gravure model and actress
- Kumiko Takizawa (滝沢 久美子; 1952–2022), Japanese voice actress
- Kumiko Tanaka-Ishii (田中 久美子), Japanese computational linguist and a professor
- Kumiko Watanabe (渡辺 久美子; born 1965), Japanese voice actress
- Kumiko Watanabe (渡辺 久美子; born 1936), Japanese diver
- Kumiko Yokoyama (横山 久美子; born 1972), Japanese cross-country skier

== Fictional characters ==
- Kumiko (character), a character portrayed by Tamlyn Tomita in The Karate Kid Part II (1986) and Cobra Kai (2021)
- Kumiko Albertson, a recurring character in The Simpsons

== See also ==
- Kumiko (bar), Japanese bar/restaurant in West Loop, Chicago
- 4454 Kumiko, main-belt Asteroid
- Kumikō, a game of kōdō
- kumiko, the pieces of lattice work in shoji
