= Kimiko =

- Pronunciation: Kimiko
- Gender: Female

Origin
- Origin: Japanese
- Meaning: Senior, Noble, Empress
- Region of origin: Japanese

Kimiko is a feminine Japanese given name. Notable people with the name include:

- Kimiko Burton (born 1964 or 1965) American attorney and government official
- Kimiko Date (伊達 公子; born 1970), Japanese former professional tennis player
- Kimiko Douglass-Ishizaka, (born 1976) German-Japanese composer, pianist, and former Olympic weightlifter and powerlifter
- Kimiko Ezaka (江坂 君子; born 1943), Japanese former swimmer
- Fujiwara no Kimiko (西園寺公子; 1232–1304), Japanese Empress of Japan
- Kimiko Gelman (born 1966), Japanese American actress
- Kimiko Glenn (born 1989), Japanese-American actress and singer
- Kimiko Hahn (born 1955), American poet and professor
- Kimiko Hashimoto (橋本 きみ子; born 1953), Japanese women's basketball player
- Kimiko Hida (飛田 季実子; born 1977), Japanese handball goalkeeper
- Kimiko Hirata (平田 仁子; born 1970), Japanese climate activist
- Kimiko Ikegami (池上季実子; born 1959), Japanese-American actress
- Kimiko Itoh (伊藤 君子; born 1946), Japanese singer
- Kimiko Itō (位藤 紀美子; born 1945), Japanese pedagogue
- Kimiko Jinnai (陣内 貴美子; born 1964), Japanese badminton player
- Kimiko Kasai (笠井 紀美子; born 1945), Japanese retired jazz singer
- Kimiko Koyama (こやま きみこ; born 1979), Japanese voice actress and singer
- Kimiko Kurihara (栗原 君子; born 1946), Japanese politician
- Kimiko Mohri (毛利 公子; 1960–1990), Japanese leader and bassist of the group Sugar (trio)
- Kimiko Nishimoto (西本 喜美子; 1928–2025), Brazilian-born Japanese photographer and internet celebrity
- Kimiko O. Bowman (1927–2019), Japanese-American statistician
- Kimiko Okamoto (岡本 貴美子; born 1932 or 1933), Japanese athlete
- Kimiko Raheem (born 1999), Sri Lankan swimmer
- Kimiko Saitō (斉藤 貴美子; born 1977), Japanese voice actress and narrator
- Kimiko Sato (佐藤 公子; born 1946), Japanese former swimmer
- Kimiko Shiratori (白鳥 公子; born 1968), Japanese former football player
- Kimiko Soldati (born 1974), American diver
- Kimiko Suzuki (1929–1992), Japanese architect
- Kimiko Tsukada (塚田 紀美子; born 1937), Japanese artistic gymnast
- Kimiko Uehara (上原 きみ子; born 1946), Japanese manga artist
- Kimiko Yo (余 貴美子; born 1956), Japanese actress
- Kimiko Zakreski (born 1983) Canadian snowboarder
- Debra Kimiko Nishida, Canadian geologist
- Yasmine Kimiko Yamada (born 1997), Swiss figure skater

== Fictional characters ==
- Kimiko Miyashiro, nicknamed "the Female (of the species)", a character from the comic The Boys and its TV adaptation
- Kimiko Ayasato (綾里 キミ子) (Morgan Fey), a character from the Ace Attorney franchise
- Kimiko Nakamura, secondary fictional character from the TV series Heroes
- Kimiko Nanasawa (七澤 希美子), main character from the webcomic Megatokyo
- Kimiko "Thunderbolt" Ross, character from the webcomic Dresden Codak
- Kimiko Tohomiko, character from the animated television series Xiaolin Showdown

== See also ==
- Kimiko, a 1935 Japanese film directed by Mikio Naruse
