= 来実 =

来実, meaning "come, fruit", is an Asian given name.

It may refer to:

- Kumi, Japanese feminine given name
- Kurumi, Japanese feminine given name
- Raimi, Japanese feminine given name

== See also ==
- Kumi (disambiguation)
- Kurumi (disambiguation)
