= Kumiko (disambiguation) =

Kumiko is a feminine Japanese given name.

Kumiko may also refer to:

- Kumiko (bar), Japanese bar in West Loop, Chicago
- 4454 Kumiko, main-belt Asteroid
- Kumikō, an incense-comparing game and aspect of kōdō
- Kumiko (woodworking), the pieces of lattice work in traditional Japanese architecture
- Kumiko, the Treasure Hunter, a 2014 American drama film
