= 胡桃 =

胡桃, meaning walnut, may refer to:

- Kurumi, the Japanese transliteration
- Hu Tao (Chinese: 胡桃, pinyin: Hú Táo), a character in 2020 video game Genshin Impact
