= Torture Tower Doesn't Sleep =

Multimedia franchise created by Mothy

- The cover of Torture Tower Doesn't Sleep -The Ring of Evil-, showcasing the three main antagonist "sisters" on the cover, as designed by the artist Maruino
- Created by: mothy

Print publications
- Novels: See "List of literary works related to the franchise"
- Comics: See "List of literary works related to the franchise"

Audio
- Original music: See "Discography related to the franchise"
- First release: July 26, 2013; 13 years ago (Note: Vocaloid piece on Niconico)

Torture Tower Doesn't Sleep is a Japanese multimedia franchise created by the Vocaloid producer mothy (also known as Akuno-P). Officially launched in August 2013, the franchise spans an original promotional song featuring the Vocaloid VY1, a vocaloid novel trilogy published by ASCII Media Works under their Dengeki Bunko imprint, and multiple manga adaptations serialized in Dengeki Maoh and COMIC@LOID. The series explores themes of historical deception, the human capacity for cruelty, and psychological sadism. The series has elements and plot point that converge with the plot of The Evillious Chronicles; However, despite the series being connected, they are two distinct franchises and universes.

== History ==
The franchise was first conceptualized by mothy back in 2011 as part of the Evillious Chronicles, before mothy decided to make it a standalone franchise and set in a single country rather than in numerous countries across eras like in Evillious Chronicles. To further emphasize the difference from the other franchise, mothy decided to use a version/model of Vocaloid he had never used for Evillious Chronicles, specifically VY1.

The first song of the series was published on Niconico on 26 July 2016. The initial parts of the story were featured on 27 July 2013 in the monthly release of Dengeki Maoh alongside Mini Dura and ib -Instant Bullet-. Dengeki Online announced that a spin-off comic on the series was made by artist Sakiyuki Keiki and that by the time of the article, August 2013, the series was received with acclaim by the public. Artist Maruino also worked on the novel series' art. The vocaloid novel was released on 27 August 2013, meanwhile "The Torture Tower Never Sleeps - The Clown Chapter" manga serialization was released on "COMIC@LOID" from 13 September 2013.

During the 2014 "Niconico Chokaigi" event, held at Makuhari Messe in Chiba, the vocaloid novel volumes were selected to be read out loud to the public.

== Plot ==
The plot of Torture Tower Doesn't Sleep is centered on Torcia Tower in Lion City, the former stronghold of the late war hero and sadist Lord Hank Fieron. Decades after Fieron's death, an evil, pain-devouring wraith named Beritoad attempts to regain his lost power by orchestrating a cycle of human sacrifices within the tower. To do this, Beritoad utilizes three sadistic killers known as the "Daughters of Sir Torture": Gibbet, Rack, and Maiden. In reality, Fieron had no children; Rack and Maiden are anthropomorphic manifestations of the tower's torture devices, while Gibbet is a human woman named Chris Tubel who was driven mad. The trio lures victims by claiming the tower houses the "Pot of Basuzu," a mystical artifact capable of curing any terminal illness. The story begins when a thief named Lloyd Lowell infiltrates the tower to steal the artifact but is captured and tortured. After this, a circus clown and wraith hunter named Raymond Atwood arrives to investigate. Raymond holds a personal vendetta against Beritoad, who is his biological father. As the narrative progresses, the conflict expands into regional politics involving the Crossrosier Sorcerer Society and the assassin network Père Noël. Gibbet manipulates corrupt local mayors into delivering citizens to the tower as human sacrifices, while Raymond forms an alliance with his childhood friend Liam Highland and fighters Joshua and Vivian. They discover that Crossrosier's leader, Hargain, is conducting alchemical experiments to engineer an artificial "emerald-haired girl" as a weapon against wraiths. In the final volume, Raymond and the Crossrosier armed forces launch a massive assault against Torcia Tower and its architectural mirror, the Reverse Tower. Raymond's companions are killed during the siege. Deep within the structure, a mysterious boy named Amo manifests; he is revealed to be the soul of Amostia, an entity who traveled from The Evillious Chronicles universe after the collapse of the Third Period, whose physical body was remodeled into the device that comprises Rack. Raymond eventually confronts Beritoad. At the climax, a mutilated Lloyd reappears and drinks from the Pot of Basuzu to heal his wounds, only for Gibbet to reveal the artifact is actually a container for Beritoad's contaminated bathwater. Despite the deception, Lloyd sacrifices his life to save Raymond. Raymond subdues the weakened Beritoad, prompting Rack to trigger a structural collapse that destroys Torcia Tower. While Beritoad is suppressed and the stronghold leveled, the remaining sisters survive, prompting the remaining characters to stay vigilant against future threats as Raymond mourns Lloyd's death.

== Discography related to the franchise ==
- Evils Extra. Released August 11, 2013 (Comiket 84 physical CD print) [Part of Evillious Chronicles), specifically Track 2: "Torture Tower Doesn't Sleep" (拷問塔は眠らない) feat. VY1.

== List of literary works related to the franchise ==
=== Novels ===
- Torture Tower Doesn't Sleep -The Three Daughters of Sir Torture- (拷問塔は眠らない -拷問卿の三姉妹-). Written by mothy; illustrated by Maruino. Published by ASCII Media Works (Dengeki Bunko). August 27, 2013. 276 pages. ISBN 978-4-04-891872-5
- Torture Tower Doesn't Sleep -The Emerald Girl- (拷問塔は眠らない -エメラルドの少女-). Written by mothy; illustrated by Maruino. Published by ASCII Media Works (Dengeki Bunko). October 26, 2013. 260 pages. ISBN 978-4-04-891873-2
- Torture Tower Doesn't Sleep -The Ring of Evil- (拷問塔は眠らない -悪の円環-). Written by mothy; illustrated by Maruino. Published by ASCII Media Works (Dengeki Bunko). April 26, 2014. 308 pages. ISBN 978-4-04-866521-6

=== Manga ===
- Torture Tower Doesn't Sleep -Clown Chapter- (拷問塔は眠らない -道化師の章-). Original story by mothy; art by Shiina Soga; character design by Maruino. Serialized in COMIC@LOID. Published by KADOKAWA (Dengeki Comics NEXT). May 27, 2014. 226 pages. ISBN 978-4-04-866593-3
- Torture Tower Doesn't Sleep -Three Sisters Chapter- (拷問塔は眠らない -三姉妹の章-). Original story by mothy; art by Hinoaki; character design by Maruino. Serialized in Dengeki Maoh. Published by KADOKAWA. May 27, 2014. Single volume completion.

== See also ==
- Evillious Chronicles
