= Evillious Chronicles =

Multimedia franchise created by mothy

- Promotional artwork by Ichika for "Seven Crimes and Punishments", featuring the main character cast of the Seven Deadly Sins, plus characters from the Original Sin arc
- Created by: mothy
- Owner: the heavenly yard

Print publications
- Books: See "List of literary works related to the franchise"
- Novels: See "List of literary works related to the franchise"
- Comics: See "List of literary works related to the franchise"

Theatrical presentations
- Plays: See "List of theatrical plays"

Games
- Video game: As part of "Hatsune Miku: Colorful Stage! (Project SEKAI)"

Audio
- Original music: See "Discography related to the franchise"

Miscellaneous
- Toys: Nendoroid Petite Hatsune Miku Selection Riliane and Allen; 2024 Good Smile Company Riliane and Allen Nendroids
- First release: April 8, 2008; 18 years ago (Note: The Daughter of Evil)

The Evillious Chronicles or Aku no series (悪ノシリーズ) are unofficial names of a Japanese multimedia dark fantasy series created by the musician and Vocaloid producer mothy or Akuno-p (悪ノP). Beginning with the 2008 Vocaloid songs "The Daughter of Evil" and "The Servant of Evil", the series developed into an interconnected narrative told through songs, albums, novels, manga and other media. Its stories are primarily set in the fictional world of Evillious and incorporate recurring characters, locations and mythological elements across different periods of its fictional history. The novels from the franchise were the first literary example of Vocaloid novels.

== History ==
=== Origins ===
The origins of the Evillious Chronicles are tied to Vocaloid culture in 2008. Its creator, the musician and Vocaloid producer mothy, began composing Vocaloid music after becoming interested in the works being uploaded to Nico Nico Douga. (Note: As of the latest review of this article, the site has rebranded itself as "Niconico") In a 2010 interview with BARKS, mothy said that he had previously played bass in a university band but had not composed music himself. After encountering Vocaloid through Nico Nico Douga, he became interested in producing songs and chose Kagamine Rin and Len, which had recently been released, rather than Hatsune Miku due to the latter already being extensively used by other publishers at the time. His first song was "Ten Minute Love" which was sung by Kagamine Rin.

In a 2015 interview with Music Natalie, he recalled that when he started he had no expectation that he would continue the project for many years, describing it as something he had initially undertaken for personal enjoyment rather than revenue, especially since, according to him, profiting off of Vocaloid songs was uncommon at the time he had started. His first Vocaloid releases were relatively independent experiments. According to his 2010 BARKS interview, his first three songs were primarily attempts to explore what he could do with Vocaloid, and they attracted comparatively little attention. Thus, he subsequently decided to make a song with the audience in mind, which led to the creation of "The Daughter of Evil", the first song in the series. Mothy stated that his initial musical inspiration for his songs were tied to his affinity for viking metal, which prompted him to introduce folklore, mythology and fantasy in his songs. According to him, what influenced his narratives were also the novels written by Yasutaka Tsutsui due to their twists and their unrealism. Another stated inspiration was the Vocaloid song "Saihate" by Kobayashi Onyx.

=== Beginning ===
Original video of the song "Daughter of Evil" in the wider "Evillious Chronicles" franchise:【Kagamine Rin】Daughter of Evil【Original Medieval Narrative】
- https://www.nicovideo.jp/watch/sm2916956

"The Daughter of Evil" (悪ノ娘, aku no musume) was uploaded to Nico Nico Douga on 6 April 2008. Mothy later described its creation in a series of posts on his personal blog which, at the time, was named the heavenly yard. According to his account, the initial idea came from a line he wanted to have Kagamine Rin speak: "Oh-ho-ho-ho, kneel before me." He then developed the character and song around that line. Furthermore, he added that at the time the tool he used was Windows Movie Maker and that his initial goal was to reach 1,000 views.

Original design of Riliane Lucifen d'Autriche and other characters in the original "Daughter of Evil" video (which unlike the princess are turned around).

The song was originally conceived as a self-contained story rather than as the beginning of a large fictional universe, confirming in his Natalie interview that he had not yet conceived the extensive interconnected history that would later become Evillious Chronicles. "The Daughter of Evil" was followed on 29 April 2008 by "The Servant of Evil" (悪ノ召使, aku no meshitsukai), which presented a complementary perspective on the story. The two songs were subsequently followed by "Regret Message" (リグレットメッセージ), further expanding the narrative.

Despite initial low expectations, the popularity of these songs encouraged mothy to continue developing their characters and setting.

=== Expansion ===
Mothy has identified "Evil Food Eater Conchita" (悪食娘コンチータ, akujiki musume konchīta), released in 2009, as an important turning point. He explained that he had become interested in the idea different stories could secretly share the same setting and fictional universe. He decided that connecting "Daughter of Evil" with "Evil Food Eater Conchita" could encourage listeners to imagine connections between the works and create their own theories and encourage viewers to analyze the media they consumed. From this point, the separate stories increasingly developed into a shared, complex, interconnected fictional setting. This early approach to the development of the Evillious Chronicles was initially additive rather than centrally planned. Mothy later described his early method as creating an individual song and then developing further stories from that song. He compared this directly with his later approach, which started following the "Judgement of Corruption" (悪徳のジャッジメント) arc, in which he begins with an overall conception of the story and then designs individual songs around it. On the same year, his first major album, Evils Theater, was released in 2009 for the price of ¥1,000, which included a 16-pages booklet and 11 tracks from the series. By this time the franchise expanded furthermore in its canon. This took the form of new songs, numerous derivative works such as parodies, interpretation music videos, fan-made music videos, cover songs, and novels, comics, and illustrations have been published on other sharing sites. The transition from a songs-only medium to the development of prose material became particularly remarkful with the publication of The Daughter of Evil: Clôture of Yellow (悪ノ娘 黄のクロアテュール, Aku no musume ki no kuroatyūru) in 2010. The novel was written by mothy himself and expanded upon material that could not be presented within the original song format. Mothy later explained that the limitations of a song had left substantial material from the original story unused, and that the opportunity to novelize the work allowed him to incorporate some of this material. The success of "The Daughter of Evil" also led to adaptations outside recorded music. A stage production based on the song was performed in January 2010. In 2011 mothy started to write light novels based on "The Seven Deadly Sins of Evil" (悪ノ大罪, aku no taizai), inspired by the The Seven Deadly Sins and the Four Last Things painting by Hieronymus Bosch. A report from 2013 stated how the "Daughter of Evil" franchise had sold 800,000 copies and that a book-type drama CD was on its way for release. The novel soon after got serialized and its success (by that time, in 2014, it had sold 1 million copies) brought to the creation of an official manga, produced by the mangaka Ichika (壱加). On 13 September 2013 "MIKU-Pack 03" featured the musical piece "Evil Food Eater Conchita", part of the series. In 2013, the official Hatsune Miku/Piapro blog announced a Nendoroid Petite Hatsune Miku Selection completely based on Allen and Riliane from the Pride arc. By 2017 PHP reported that The Daughter of Evil: Clôture of Yellow had sold 1.25 million copies, and also called the "Master of the Heavenly Yard" novel the narrative conclusion of the novel series. In 2021, Hanmoto, a major Japanese book database and publishing industry network, stated that due to fan requests piling up, new prints were announced. A retrospective article on the role of KAITO in Vocaloid music identified Evillious Chronicles as part of the so-called "project-based" genre, mentioning KAITO's role in the Evillious Chronicles song named "Judgement of Corruption", and stating how the song contributed to KAITO's history due to the fact it retained popularity for a prolonged time. The musical latest re-run was March 13–17, 2024 at Kokumin Kyosai Coop Hall/Space Zero in Tokyo. In July 2024, Good Smile Company announced full Nendoroids of Rin as the Daughter of Evil and Len as the Servant of Evil. Minichum mascots by Medicos Entertainment based on each protagonists of the Seven Deadly Sins arc were announced to be for pre-sale in October 2026 and their official release was set for March 2027.

== Plot ==
=== Original sin arc ===
The earliest events take place in the First Period, one of the worldlines of the series. Scientists create the Second Period, a virtual reality intended to preserve humanity, but eventually introduce Hereditary Evil Raiser (H.E.R) Syndrome after its inhabitants and technology become too advanced. Among the scientists is Behemo Barisol, a traumatized individual who is also isolated for his gender expression, who creates an avatar named Levia Barisol, modelled after an ideal version of himself. As the Second Period becomes infected by a phenomenon called "Malice" (Which is the H.E.R introduced before), Levia investigates its origin and discovers that it comes from the First Period. After secretly becoming infected herself, she is persuaded by Seth Twiright, a fellow scientist, to cross dimensions and kill Behemo, whom Seth claims is the source of the Malice. Levia realizes that Seth is manipulating her to take her place and make her succumb to "Malice", and instead rescues Behemo, bringing him into the Second Period and barring Seth's entry into the ship.

As the Second Period approaches destruction, the scientists prepare to evacuate aboard the spaceship Climb One. Seventy-two scientists depart, but Seth secretly boards the ship and manipulates Lich Arklow into killing most of the crew. Climb One eventually crashes on Earth after an ideological crash in the ship turns physical, killing the remaining scientists, except for Seth and a female engineer named Luna Hazuki, and trapping their spirit data within the ship; the disaster also introduces magic into the world, which is just advanced technology from the Second Period. Some of the scientists are reincarnated as supernatural beings under the lead of Held, who reincarnates in a tree known as the "Millennium Tree", while the spirits of Levia and Behemo remain within Climb One. The people of Levianta later discover the ship and worship it as the sacred artifact Sin and create a theocratic society around it after hearing the voices of the twins.

Seth subsequently creates artificial humans afflicted with HER Syndrome, known as the Ghoul Children, including Meta Salmhofer, Kiril Clockworker, and Irina Clockworker. In Levianta, Queen Merry-Go-Round, who is made to believe by the trapped Levia and Behemo to be their daughter, learns that the world will eventually be destroyed unless they are reincarnated as humans. Project "Ma" is thus established to create such reincarnations. Eve Zvezda is selected as its first candidate due to her magical powers and is manipulated by Adam Moonlit, who is himself being influenced by Seth Twiright. Eve becomes pregnant with twins, Cain and Abel, but the children are stillborn, causing the first Ma experiment to fail. Eve and Adam subsequently flee to Held's Forest in the country of Elphegort, where they marry. Seth later becomes head of Project Ma and recruits Meta Salmhofer as its next candidate. Meta successfully gives birth to the twins Hänsel and Gretel, but escapes with them, causing the experiment to be declared another failure and Seth being fired. Meta is later murdered by Eve Moonlit, who is suffering from trauma and delusions, and Hänsel and Gretel are adopted by Eve and Adam Moonlit, whom crossed path after the forest spirit Michaela (formerly "Michael") tried to help Eve find fruits having fallen in love with her.

Years later, Elluka Chirclatia cures Kiril's HER Syndrome and becomes engaged to him, provoking jealousy in Irina who is unable to be cured and sees Elluka as a stranger taking away her brother from her. Both Irina and Kiril were originally Ghoul Children engineered by Seth Twiright, who were later set free. Irina is manipulated by Seth to enter the 7th "Ma Project" and to kill all her rivals including her sister-in-law Elluka. After Elluka is killed, Kiril attempts to revive her using Sin after being lured there by Levia and Behemo which see his grief as an opportunity to escape the spaceship. The experiment fails catastrophically for both parties: Levia and Behemo partially reincarnates within Elluka's body (only Levia however remains conscious, albeit amnesiac, believing to be Elluka), while a dragon which was supposed to be their physical form escapes from the ship and devastates Levianta and all the sorrounding nations in the Levianta Catastrophe. Irina is saved by a dying Seth who through a "ritual" which moves her soul in a red plushie cat called I.R, Seth himself survives his physical death by moving his soul in an artifact he had created, while fragments of Levia and Behemo enter Hänsel and Gretel and Seth becomes the Demon of Wrath.

Following the catastrophe, Adam and Eve abandon Hänsel and Gretel due to the consequences of the Levianta Catastrophe. The twins eventually kill their adoptive parents and divide Eve's soul into seven fragments which enter seven distinct objects left behind by Seth Twiright, each corresponding to one of the Seven Deadly Sins. The fragments become associated with magical vessels capable of transmitting the sins to others. The forest god Held sends Elluka to recover the vessels after they were scattered around by Hänsel and Gretel, who thought them as toys, beginning the central conflict of the subsequent history with Irina who also wants to gather them to initiate a Re_Birthday and restore her kingdom.

=== Seven Deadly Sins arcs ===
Over the following centuries, the seven vessels repeatedly influence human history as it rebuilds itself following the major societal collapse, returning to a medieval age of sorts which by the end of the series starts to approach the equivalent of the original earth's contemporary era. Their power manifests through people whose desires become increasingly destructive and whose actions are also often influenced by artifacts tied to the sins.

The earliest major Sin-related story takes place during the second century of the Evillious Calendar. The Lust vessel eventually comes into the possession of Cherubim Venomania, a nobleman of the Asmodean region of the Beelzenian Empire. Born with a facial deformity that contributes to his family's rejection of him, Cherubim grows into an isolated man, deeply traumatized after his childhood love story with Gumina Glassred falls apart when she rejects him due to his appearance and later becomes engaged to his handsome brother due to politics, Sateriasis. After a fit of madness where he slaughters his family, he obtains a magical artifact through I.R. (Irina) in her cat form that allows him to assume his dead brother's face. Operating under the stolen name of "Duke Sateriasis Venomania," he uses the power of the Lust vessel to establish a mansion where numerous women become his victims, including Gumina herself. Meanwhile Elluka arrives to hunt down Irina and reclaim the Lust artifact. Venomania's actions eventually lead to his downfall and assassination by Karchess Crim dressed up as Elluka, after which the Lust vessel continues its journey through history.

More than a century later, the Gluttony vessel becomes associated with Banica Conchita, a noblewoman of the Conchita territory. Driven by childhood trauma from a mother who starved and abused her, Banica develops an extreme psychological obsession with food, which culminates in her making a pact with the Demon of Gluttony residing inside a wine glass. This demonic contract grants her the supernatural ability to digest virtually anything. Banica progressively descends into madness, consuming increasingly repulsive objects and poisonous materials in pursuit of new sensations, terrorizing her subjects and household. Her story reaches its horrific climax when she cooks and eats her chief chef, Carlos, and willingly consumes her remaining servants, Pollo and Arte, who are actually the reincarnated souls of Hänsel and Gretel. Left entirely alone in the ruins of her estate, her insatiable hunger forces her to literally consume her own body, leaving behind only the Gluttony vessel and transforming her soul into the next Demon of Gluttony. The principal events of this arc establish Banica as a permanent, cosmic anchor tied to the ultimate fate of the Third Period.

The Pride storyline takes place centuries later and centers on the Kingdom of Lucifenia and the royal twins Riliane Lucifen d'Autriche and Alexiel Lucifen d'Autriche. Numerous characters who later become important to the Lucifenian conflict, including Leonhart Avadonia, Mariam Phutapie, Clarith, Kyle Marlon, Elluka Clockworker and others, are born and become involved in the political struggles of the period. The timeline eventually reaches the birth of Riliane and Alexiel by King Arth Lucifen d'Autriche (Note: King Arth Lucifen d'Autriche was previously a man who died in a carriage crash; However, through the sympathetic intervention of the spirit of Lich Arklow, he got reincarnated as a mud doll/golem) and the succession of Riliane to the Lucifenian throne. Their father dies due to his mud body being unusually susceptible to the effects of the 'Gula' disease (which is a side effect of the Sin of Gluttony). Shortly after, the twins encounter the Demon of Gluttony, which possesses Riliane. When Elluka Clockworker forcefully exorcises the demon, it wipes Riliane's memories, including that of her twin. To save his sister and absorb the lingering curse, Alexiel transfers the residual demonic entity to himself with the help of Lich Arklow's spirit. His death is faked by the political establishment to keep the royal lineage stable, his name is changed to 'Allen,' and he is adopted by Leonhart Avadonia who raises him. Later, during their adolescence, the maid Ney Phutapie, an ally of Irina, manipulates the memory-wiped princess by gifting her a mirror containing the Vessel of Pride. Unknowingly infected by the Demon of Pride, Riliane becomes increasingly authoritarian after becoming queen. Her policies contribute to conflict with neighboring Elphegort which leads to a genocide of its green-haired population, the casus belli tied to her jealousy in regards to Michaela, a sapphic girl (Note: Originally, she was a male human scientist on the Climb One called Michael Arklow, and later, after its crash, a genderless spirit of the forest; however, she got turned into a human woman resembling Eve Moonlit through the help of Elluka, who was in pursuit of Irina.) in love with Clarith who caught the attentions of King Kyle Marlon, whom Riliane has a crush on. Meanwhile, Alexiel and the other members of the royal court become caught in the political struggle surrounding her rule. Riliane's actions eventually contribute to war, famine, persecution, ethnic cleansing and the destruction of the Lucifenian monarchy from within. The rebellion against Riliane culminates in the Lucifenian Revolution led by the proletariat, the borgeuise and the knights of the Kingdom and supported by foreign intervention by Marlon's Kingdom, the latter of which intervines under the casus belli of vindicating the genocide of Elphegort and the death of the King's infatuation. Elluka also helps the resistance forces, working alongside the red-clad warrior Germaine Avadonia to overthrow Riliane's tyrannical regime. Alexiel sacrifices himself in an attempt to save his sister, revealing his identity and crossdressing as her while Riliane flees, resulting in his execution. Lucifenia subsequently transitions from a monarchy into a republic after a brief period of Marlon occupation caused by King Kyle Marlon being infected by the Demon of Pride, which had left Riliane's body. After the revolution succeeds, Elluka secures the Venom Sword (the Vessel of Lust) from Keel Freezis before moving on to tracking the next sin. Riliane survives and becomes a nun in a religious order, where she rationalizes what happened and seemingly seems to overcome her Malice infection and overpower the effects of the artifact, causing a change in her morals and intense remorse. Clarith also becomes a nun and she overhears Riliane confessing to be the queen and having ordered the genocide, leading Clarith to a blind rage which almost leads to the assassination of Riliane, before deciding that it was not the right thing to do.

The Sloth storyline occurs roughly a century after the main events of the Lucifenian period, focusing on Margarita Blankenheim, a wealthy doctor’s daughter who has chronic insomnia, as she is actually a doll. Margarita enters an unhappy, arranged marriage with Marquis Kaspar Blankenheim, an unfaithful and abusive aristocrat who squanders her family's wealth. Desperate to find peace and alleviate the suffering around her, Margarita is targeted by Julia Abelard, the leader of the criminal syndicate Père Noël. Julia feeds Margarita the recipe for a lethal sleep-inducing potion called "Gift", playing on the linguistic double meaning where the word means a present in English but translates to poison in German. Under the demon's corrupting influence, Margarita mass-produces the poison, administering it to her husband, her acquaintances, and eventually the entire city's water supply to "free them from anxiety." This results in the peaceful-looking deaths of the entire citizenry, an event known historically as the Toragay Epidemic. Believing she has successfully brought eternal peace, Margarita consumes the poison herself to finally achieve sleep. Following the epidemic, Elluka Clockworker and her apprentice Gumillia hunt down the syndicate to stop Père Noël from using the tragedy to control what remains of Elphegort. This culminates in the dramatic Duel of Merrigod Plateau. In the ensuing magical battle, Julia's adoptive son Lemy Abelard is fatally wounded, and Julia Abelard is revealed to be the ancient sorceress Irina Clockworker using a body-jumping technique. As the confrontation peaks due to Banica Conchita summoning a giant skeleton known as the World Eater, a catastrophic soul-fusing event occurs: the souls of Levia (extracted from within Elluka), Irina Clockworker, and Eve Moonlit (whose soul became the Princess of Sloth) are forcibly violently ripped together into a single, morally corrupt amalgamation. This newly formed composite being takes control of Elluka’s physical body and assumes the name Ma, leaving Gumillia in the Hellish Yard (where she later takes on the role of Master of the Hellish Yard), alone, and effectively ending Elluka Clockworker’s journey as an independent sorceress for centuries.

The Envy storyline is primarily set within the country of Jakoku; the central narrative concerns Kayo Sudou, a tailor living in the town of Enbizaka. Kayo's history is deeply intertwined with the Demon of Envy; years prior, the Demon utilized a body-swapping technique to steal the identity of Kayo's mother, Kagura Octo, trapping Kagura's consciousness within the Twin Blades of Levianta (the true Vessel of Envy) while the demon raised Kayo alongside her father, Nagare Sudou. Kayo later marries her cousin, Gakuga Octo, but her life is shattered by the Great Fire of Enbizaka, which kills her child and leaves her husband missing. While healing from her wounds, Ma visits Kayo and uses a body swap technique, stealing Kayo's physical form for herself. Driven by deep-seated trauma and fueled by the corrupting influence of the Envy shears, Kayo suffers from severe delusions. She becomes convinced that a wealthy local cloth merchant, Kai Miroku, is actually her late husband Gakuga, and that the women in his life are rival lovers stealing his affection. Driven by jealous paranoia, Kayo systematically targets Kai's family, his wife and two daughters, murdering them one by one while stealing their clothes and accessories to dress up and gain "her husband's" favor. After finally murdering Kai himself when he fails to recognize her, Kayo is arrested and sentenced to death and beheaded. After her death, it is revealed that her husband Gakuga, now taking on the name Gakusha, has been alive all along and now is a monk. He later visits the place where Kayo's head is placed, despite not knowing who she is anymore.

The Greed storyline occurs near the end of the Third Period of the Evillious Chronicles universe. Its central figure is Gallerian Marlon, a corrupt judge and Director of the USE Dark Star Bureau who becomes obsessed with collecting the vessels of the Seven Deadly Sins. Gallerian is born in EC 944 to the sorceress Ma and Gandalf Marlon. Following the tragic deaths of his wife and daughter in EC 978, Ma, faking to be a close friend, manipulates the grieving judge into collecting the Sin vessels by convincing him that their collective power can cure the "disability" of the Clockworker's Doll, which Gallerian delusionally believes is his surviving daughter, Michelle. Gallerian constructs Evil's Theater in the center of the Millennium Tree Forest in EC 982 to house his acquired collection. His corrupt legal activities eventually trigger massive political instability across the Union State of Evillious. In August of EC 983, the Leviantan Civil War erupts due to public fury over Gallerian's corrupt verdicts, and he is murdered in his mansion by Nemesis Sudou. After his demise, Ma claims the remaining vessels, which remain inside the theater and the mansion. Evil's Theater ultimately transforms into a supernatural hub where the specialized manifestations associated with the sin vessels gather to await the end of the world.

Nemesis Sudou, who is secretly Gallerian Marlon's illegitimate daughter, becomes driven by a desire for vengeance against her father, the corrupt global elite, and the execution of her lover, Nyoze Octo. Joining the radical extremist Tasan Party, Nemesis rises through its ranks to become its leader ("Commander N") and seizes control of the Kingdom of Elphegort, transforming it into the totalitarian state of Tasan Elphegort. Geopolitical tensions rapidly escalate as Tasan Elphegort embarks on an aggressive expansionist campaign, declaring war on neighboring nations and sparking the Great War that engulfs Evillious. Concurrently, rumors spread that Gallerian's immense fortune and the highly coveted Vessels of Sin remain hidden within the Millennium Tree Forest, triggering an influx of treasure hunters and military factions into the woods. During the conflict, Nemesis utilizes the Vessel of Wrath, a golden revolver, to unleash "Punishment," a devastating superweapon. After devastating enemy forces and destroying key locations including Onigashima and the Millennium Tree Forest, killing Held, Tasan Elphegort is eventually surrounded in EC 999 by international forces demanding unconditional surrender. In response, encouraged by the Clockworker's Doll, an unyielding Nemesis fires Punishment, the equivalent of a nuclear weapon, releasing 108 destructive nuclear blasts across the globe. This act of absolute destruction annihilates global civilization, bringing the Third Period of the Evillious Chronicles to its end.

=== Clockwork lullaby ===
The Third Period was designed to conclude in one of four possible ways, collectively known as the Four Endings or Four Last Things. The four outcomes correspond to the Master of the Graveyard, the Master of the Court, the Master of the Hellish Yard, and the Master of the Heavenly Yard. The endings represent death, judgment, hell, and heaven respectively, and were established as possible conclusions to the Third Period. The setting's rules allow for the effects of more than one ending to occur, and one ending can potentially be altered or counteracted by another.

The Hellish Ending occurs when Nemesis Sudou launches the Punishment weapons in EC 999. The resulting attacks destroy the Third Period and its inhabitants. The destruction causes the Third Period to merge with the Hellish Yard, while the souls residing in the Heavenly Yard are subsequently drawn into it. This outcome is associated with Nemesis and the Master of the Hellish Yard.

The Graveyard Ending occurs in EC 1000, when Banica Conchita uses the Neo Black Box created by Seth Twiright to travel to parallel worlds aboard Evil's Theater II. Banica and her servants subsequently continue their search for food in these new worlds. The ending is associated with the Master of the Graveyard.

The Court Ending results from the premature Re_birthday initiated by the irregular twins Adam and Eve. In this outcome, Adam, Eve, Gammon Octo, and Irina Clockworker become involved in a repetition of the Third Period's history. Irina assumes the role of Alice Merry-Go-Round, and the events of the world repeat multiple times. The ending is associated with the Master of the Court.

The Heavenly Ending occurs through the intervention of the spirit of Allen Avadonia in EC 1000. The spirits of Allen and his twin sister Riliane Lucifen d'Autriche use a golden key to create the Fourth Period, a new world in which the influence of the gods and other entities from the previous world is reduced. The Heavenly Ending is associated with the Master of the Heavenly Yard.

Having spent a millennium attempting to reconstruct and purify the tragic history of Evillious through twelve mythical music boxes, the spirit of Kiril Clockworker realizes that the history he has been documenting is tethered to a vast, cosmic cycle. The souls are ultimately given a choice by the Master of the Hellish Yard: they can remain in the desolate, static ruins of the destroyed world, or they can choose to be reincarnated and travel onward to the newly created Fourth Period. Kiril ultimately chooses to leave the theater of judgment alongside his wife, Elluka Clockworker, and vowed to continue creating songs wherever human life exists. The Fourth Period does not function as a simple, identical repetition of the previous universe. The migrating characters carry their lingering memories, fractured souls, and the unresolved moral consequences of the previous eras into the new world line. Meanwhile, in the Fourth Period, in the light novel Unlock City, the setting shifts to the high-tech town of Tsuruki City. The plot follows reincarnated characters navigating a sudden catastrophic event where all physical locks cease functioning and invisible barriers isolate the population. The underlying driving force behind this societal collapse is revealed to be a shadow organization called "Evillious Net," covertly masterminded by an entity known simply as "Allen."

== Discography related to the franchise ==
This is an extensive list of the albums released by mothy related to the Evillious Chronicles franchise:

Albums and related releases
Label / circle	Title	Vocalists	Release date	mothy's role
KARENT	Evils Theater	Hatsune Miku, Kagamine Rin, Kagamine Len, MEIKO	17 May 2009	Producer
the heavenly yard / twinkledisc	Screws, Gears, and Pride	Kagamine Rin, Kagamine Len	15 August 2009	Music, lyrics
Independent	The Daughter of Evil ~Gemini of Charm~ Vocal & Soundtrack	Asami Shimoda	3 February 2010	Producer
the heavenly yard	prelude to forest	Hatsune Miku, KAITO, Kagamine Rin, Kagamine Len	7 February 2010	Producer
KARENT	EVILS FOREST	Kagamine Rin, Kagamine Len, MEIKO, Hatsune Miku, KAITO, GUMI, Megurine Luka, Gakupo Kamui	9 May 2010	Producer
the heavenly yard / KARENT	Evil Food Eater Conchita (Revised)	MEIKO, Kagamine Rin, Kagamine Len	8 August 2010	Music, lyrics
EXIT TUNES	悪ノ王国〜Evils Kingdom〜	Hatsune Miku, KAITO, Kagamine Rin, Kagamine Len, Megurine Luka, Gakupo Kamui, MEIKO, GUMI	22 December 2010	Producer
the heavenly yard	悪徳のジャッジメント ～a court of greed～	KAITO, Kagamine Rin, Kagamine Len, Megurine Luka, Hatsune Miku	16 January 2011	Producer
the heavenly yard	EVILS COURT	Hatsune Miku, Kagamine Rin, Kagamine Len, Megurine Luka, KAITO, Gakupo Kamui, MEIKO, GUMI	13 August 2011	Producer
PHP Institute	The Evil Quartet ~Daughter of Evil Novel Music Collection~	Hatsune Miku, KAITO, Kaai Yuki	23 March 2012	Producer
Studio Tetoteto	Daughter of Evil / Servant of Evil Arrange Album -Scarlet Serenade-	Kagamine Rin, Kagamine Len, Hatsune Miku, Megurine Luka	28 April 2012	Original composition, lyrics
KARENT	Fairy tale & Girl's talk feat. Hatsune Miku	Hatsune Miku, Kagamine Rin, Kagamine Len, Megurine Luka, MEIKO, KAITO	29 June 2012	Contributor
the heavenly yard	原罪物語-第1幕-	Hatsune Miku, KAITO, MEIKO	11 August 2012	Producer
the heavenly yard	悪ノ王国原罪物語-第2幕-	Nekomura Iroha, Megurine Luka, SF-A2 miki, Lily, Hiyama Kiyoteru	12 August 2013	Producer
—	悪ノ王国〜Evils Kingdom〜	17 February 2014	Music	
the heavenly yard	ネメシスの銃口	GUMI, Kagamine Rin, KAITO, Kaai Yuki, Hatsune Miku Append, MAYU, Megurine Luka	17 August 2014	Producer
Warner Music Japan	悪ノ王国七つの罪と罰	Gakupo Kamui, MEIKO, Kagamine Rin, Kagamine Len, Hatsune Miku, Megurine Luka, KAITO, GUMI	25 February 2015	Producer
the heavenly yard / KARENT	原罪物語 完全版	Hatsune Miku, KAITO, MEIKO, Kagamine Rin, Kagamine Len, Megurine Luka, Lily, SF-A2 miki, Nekomura Iroha, Hiyama Kiyoteru	16 August 2015	Producer
the heavenly yard	Lucifenia Trinity	MEIKO, MAYU, Megurine Luka	14 August 2016	Producer
the heavenly yard	master of the heavenly yard	Kagamine Rin, Kagamine Len, Hatsune Miku	11 August 2017	Producer
the heavenly yard	ぜんまい仕掛けの子守唄	Kagamine Rin, Kagamine Len, Hatsune Miku, KAITO, Megurine Luka, MEIKO, Gakupo Kamui, GUMI, Nekomura Iroha	10 August 2018	Producer
the heavenly yard	EVILS EXTRA	Kagamine Rin, Kagamine Len, MEIKO, VY1	12 August 2019	Producer
KARENT	E.A.T PROLOGUE	KAITO, MEIKO, Hatsune Miku, Kagamine Rin, Kagamine Len	27 August 2020	Music, lyrics
the heavenly yard	EVILS EXTRA	Kagamine Rin, Kagamine Len	4 August 2023	Producer, lyrics
KARENT/AKNP Label	去り人達のワルツ 悪ノ大罪 SEKAI EDITION＋	Hatsune Miku, Kagamine Rin, Kagamine Len	19 March 2024	Producer
KARENT	双兎が来りて笛を吹く	Kagamine Rin, Kagamine Len	13 august 2023	Producer
KARENT	食材の多い料理店	Hatsune Miku, Kagamine Rin, Kagamine Len, MEIKO, KAITO	20 September 2024	Producer, lyrics
KARENT	夕闇伯爵の招待状	Kagamine Rin, Hiyama Kiyoteru	1 August 2025	Producer, lyrics
KARENT	革命ノ赤	MEIKO	25 September 2026	Producer, lyrics

== List of literary works related to the franchise ==
=== The Daughter of Evil Series ===
- The Daughter of Evil: Clôture of Yellow PHP Institute, August 10, 2010, ISBN 978-4-569-79103-6.
  - PHP Institute (Bunko Edition), August 5, 2015, ISBN 978-4-569-76432-0.
- The Daughter of Evil: Wiegenlied of Green PHP Institute, February 25, 2011, ISBN 978-4-569-79457-0.
  - PHP Institute (Bunko Edition), August 5, 2015, ISBN 978-4-569-76433-7.
- Interlude of Evil: The Daughter of Evil World Guide PHP Institute, August 30, 2011, ISBN 978-4-569-79891-2. (Note: Includes a newly written short story and manga, "Twiright Prank" (Original concept: Song "Twiright Prank", Artwork: Ichika).)
- The Daughter of Evil: Praeludium of Red PHP Institute, December 23, 2011, ISBN 978-4-569-80137-7.
- The Daughter of Evil: Praefatio of Blue PHP Institute, March 22, 2012, ISBN 978-4-569-80307-4.
- Epic of Evil: The Daughter of Evil Fanbook PHP Institute, August 25, 2012, ISBN 978-4-569-80724-9. (Note: Includes a newly written short story, "Maiden of Fog" (Illustration: Yuu))
- The Daughter of Evil Schedule Book 2013, PHP Institute, December 16, 2012, ISBN 978-4-569-80979-3.
- The Daughter of Evil — Act 1 / COMIC, PHP Institute, 2014, ISBN 978-4-569-81665-4.
- The Daughter of Evil — Act 2 / COMIC, PHP Institute, 2014, ISBN 978-4-569-82347-8.
- The Daughter of Evil — Act 3 / COMIC, PHP Institute, 2016, ISBN 978-4-569-82775-9.
- The Daughter of Evil — Act 4 / COMIC, PHP Institute, 2017, ISBN 978-4-569-83578-5.
- ''The Daughter of Evil: Novelette of White'' / 悪ノ娘 白のノヴェレッテ (bonus booklet associated with ''Wiegenlied of Green'')
- ''The Daughter of Evil: Retrouver of Silver'' / 悪ノ娘 銀のルトルーヴェ (included in ''Interlude of Evil: The Daughter of Evil Worldguide'')

=== Deadly Sins Series ===
- Deadly Sins: The Madness of Duke Venomania PHP Institute, December 22, 2012, ISBN 978-4-569-80903-8.
  - Fukkan.com, March 2025, ISBN 978-4-8354-5944-8. E-book edition released May 23, 2025.
  - The Lunacy of Duke Venomania / ヴェノマニア公の狂気, B's-LOG COMICS, December 28, 2012, ISBN 978-4-04-728555-2, special edition ISBN 978-4-04-728556-9.
- Deadly Sins: Conchita, the Epicurean Daughter PHP Institute, September 24, 2013, ISBN 978-4-569-81455-1.
  - Fukkan.com, April 2025, ISBN 978-4-8354-5945-5. E-book edition released June 27, 2025.
- Waltz of Evil: Deadly Sins Guidebook PHP Institute, December 26, 2013, ISBN 978-4-569-81715-6.
  - Includes a newly written short story, "heavenly yard".
- Deadly Sins: The Gift from the Princess Who Brought Sleep PHP Institute, August 27, 2014, ISBN 978-4-569-82117-7.
  - Fukkan.com, May 2025, ISBN 978-4-8354-5946-2. E-book edition released July 25, 2025.
- Deadly Sins: The Fifth Pierrot PHP Institute, March 18, 2015, ISBN 978-4-569-82394-2.
  - Fukkan.com, June 2025, ISBN 978-4-8354-5947-9. E-book edition released August 29, 2025.
- Deadly Sins: The Tailor of Enbizaka PHP Institute, January 5, 2016, ISBN 978-4-569-82764-3.
  - Fukkan.com, July 2025, ISBN 978-4-8354-5948-6. E-book edition released September 30, 2025.
- Deadly Sins: The Judgment of Corruption PHP Institute, September 7, 2016, ISBN 978-4-569-83187-9.
  - Fukkan.com, August 2025, ISBN 978-4-8354-5949-3.
- Deadly Sins: The Muzzle of Nemesis PHP Institute, March 29, 2017, ISBN 978-4-569-83577-8.
  - Fukkan.com, September 2025, ISBN 978-4-8354-5950-9.
- Deadly Sins: master of the heavenly yard PHP Institute, December 4, 2017, ISBN 978-4-569-83640-9.
  - Fukkan.com, October 2025, ISBN 978-4-8354-5951-6.

=== Tale of Evil Series ===
- Tale of Evil: The Paper Devil and the Secret Archive PHP Institute, February 16, 2018, ISBN 978-4-569-78748-0.
- Tale of Evil: The Devil of Twilight and the Fake Queen PHP Institute, July 9, 2018, ISBN 978-4-569-78780-0.

=== Doujin Works ===
- Outlaw & Lychgate the heavenly yard, first distributed April 28, 2019 (at "THE VOC@LOiD M@STER 12").
  - A sequel to the novel Deadly Sins: master of the heavenly yard. Cover art: Ichika.
- Original Sin Story - Crime the heavenly yard, first distributed December 31, 2019 (at "Comiket 97"). (Note: A novelization of the doujin albums Original Sin Story - Act 1 and Original Sin Story - Complete Edition as a prequel to the Deadly Sins series. Cover art: Ichika.)
- E.A.T PROLOGUE the heavenly yard (Note: First distributed on 18 December 2020 (at "Magical Mirai 2020 in TOKYO Creators Market").)
  - Album + short story package. (Note: Sequel to the novel Deadly Sins: master of the heavenly yard. Cover art: Ichika.)
- Original Sin Story - Punishment the heavenly yard, first distributed August 13, 2022 (at "Comiket 100"). (Note: A novelization of the doujin albums Original Sin Story, Act 2 and Original Sin Story, Complete Edition as a prequel to the Deadly Sins series. Cover art: Ichika.)

=== Anthology Contributions ===
- Kagamine Rin & Len 14th Birthday Novels Kawade Shobo Shinsha, August 22, 2022, ISBN 978-4-309-03059-3. (Note: Contributed the newly written short story "The Horse of Evil" as a spin-off of "The Daughter of Evil" novel series.)

=== Other Works ===
- Unlock City Pony Canyon / EXIT TUNES, July 3, 2015, ISBN 978-4-86529-149-0. (Note: Illustration: Oguchi)
- Aku Musu (1) / あくむす（1）, KADOKAWA / Dengeki Comics NEXT, February 27, 2014, ISBN 978-4-04-866234-5.
- Aku Musu (2) / あくむす（2）, KADOKAWA / Dengeki Comics NEXT, 2015, ISBN 978-4-04-869107-9.
- The Servant of Evil Opera Buffa! (1) / 悪ノ召使 ～おぺらぶっふぁ！～1, KADOKAWA, February 27, 2014, ISBN 978-4-04-866235-2.
- The Servant of Evil Opera Buffa! (2) / 悪ノ召使 ～おぺらぶっふぁ！～2, KADOKAWA, January 27, 2015, ISBN 978-4-04-869087-4.
- Quartets of Evil / 悪ノ四重奏（カルテット）, PHP Institute, December 18, 2014, ISBN 978-4-569-82202-0.
- ''The Adventure of a Boy and a Girl'' / 少年と少女の冒険 (included in the ''World Guide'')
- ''Twiright Prank'' (included in the ''World Guide'')
- ''Her Reason'' / 彼女の理由 (included in ''Epic of Evil: The Daughter of Evil Fanbook'')

== List of theatrical plays ==
The Evillious Chronicles multimedia series has been adapted into several musical and theatrical stage productions in Japan.

=== Lust Arc ===
Two theater companies, Brioche Theatre Company and Tsukinekoza Theatre Company decided to create the play "The Madness of Duke Venomania", which was performed between 4 March 2017 and 5 March 2017. The play was performed at the Camellia Hall in Tokyo.

=== Gluttony Arc ===
The stage adaptation of "Evil Food Eater Conchita -Can I Eat This?-" was produced independently by Brioche Theatre Company, featuring returning guest appearances from Tsukinekoza members like Ryusuke Onodera, and was performed at the Camellia Hall in Tokyo between 8 December 2018 and 9 December 2018.

=== Pride Arc ===
The first commercial adaptation was "The Daughter of Evil —Alluring Gemini—" in 2010, which was produced by AG-ONE and performed by the theater troupe X-QUEST at the Tokyo Metropolitan Theatre. Asami Shimoda provided the voice for Len and Rin. In September 2011 under the title "The Daughter of Evil ~One for two~", the same cast redone the play at the Camellia Hall. Integrating plotlines from the tracks "The Daughter of Evil," "The Servant of Evil," "Regret Message," and "The Daughter of White," the musical made its return on 3 and 4 June 2017 at the Owl Spot in Tokyo, and the production was redone again in 2019 at the same venue with revised scenes and an updated musical score. The cast of the 2017 play included Reina Tanaka , Yamamoto Kazuomi, Fumika Suzuki, Yui Takano, Yukari Nakamura, Aika Tada, Kenta Kamakari, and Naoki Nokubo, whilst, the 2019 play, included Reina Tanaka again, Hoshina (an idol from the group HOOPERS), Tani Yoshiki, Tomotsune Yuki, Fukuchi Norimitsu, Tsukimiya Himena, Nishino Aya and Iwasaki Ryosuke. It was restaged again in October 2021 at the Sōgetsu Hall, expanding into a dual-lead production. The musical returned for a its latest appearance in March 2024 at the Kokumin Kyosai Coop Hall/Space Zero. Amongst the 2021 production were Karen Aizome, Ruka Mishina, Megumi Taniguchi, Sally Amaki, Momoka Onishi, Sayaka Sasaki, Kawase Shi, and Ayano Hamaura; while the notable performers from the 2024 production were Karen Aizome, Ruka Mishina again, Ayano Hamaura again, Maho Yamaguchi, Sally Amagi again and Yuka Kato.

=== Sloth Arc ===
The stage adaptation of "Gift from the Princess Who Brought Sleep～Träume sind Schäumewas～" produced independently by Brioche Theatre Company and was performed at the Shinseikan Studio in Tokyo between 15 February 2024 and 18 February 2024.

== Legacy ==
Cosplays of Venomania (Kamui Gakupo) and a cross-dressing version of Karchess Crim (Kaito) from the Lust arc

According to Mothy, he believes his series, specifically the arc surrounding "Daughter of Evil" is one of the reasons why people have the perception that Rin and Len are twin siblings. The "Daughter of Evil" novel from the series was the very first novel which was based on a Vocaloid piece, pioneering the creation of the "Vocaloid novels" genre. Evillious enters Project SEKAI, and mothy created new post-master of the heavenly yard material for the collaboration. The songs "Daughter of Evil" and "Servant of Evil" were given a mention on the TV program "Matsuko's Unknown World", in the episode which aired on 3 January 2025 as works that introduced singer Ado to Vocaloid culture. She also confirmed such event in a separate interview done by Famitsu, where she specified she also interacted with the fandom related to the song and the song itself when she was a first grader. In October 2023, at the Hatsune Miku Symphony 2023, "Symphony of Evil: A Special Feature Commemorating the 15th Anniversary of the Evil Series" was performed; This symphony is an orchestral medley of songs from the series, specifically the Seven Deadly Sins arc.

== See also ==
- Torture Tower Doesn't Sleep (Another multimedia franchise created by mothy, connected to Evillious Chronicles)
