= Khumi =

Khumi may refer to:

- Khumi people of the Chin and Arakan States of Burma and the Chittagong Hill Tracts of Bangladesh
- Khumi language proper, or Khumi Chin, a Kuki-Chin-Mizo language of Burma and Bangladesh
  - Eastern Khumi or Khami language of Chin State, Burma
- Khumi Awa language or Mro-Khimi of the Chin and Arakan States of Burma
- Miu-Khumi tribe of the Chin and Arakan States of Burma

== See also ==
- Kumi (disambiguation)
