= Gumi =

Gumi or GUMI may refer to:

- Gumi, Iran, a village in South Khorasan Province, Iran
- Gumi, Nepal, a village development committee in Surkhet District, Bheri Zone, Nepal
- Gumi, South Korea, a city in Gyeongsangbuk-do, South Korea
  - Gumi University, a university in the city of the same name
- Gumi or Elaeagnus multiflora, a species of shrub or small tree native to China, Korea and Japan
- Megumi Hinata, a Japanese singer and songwriter sometimes credited as GUMI
- Tsugumi Aritomo, a Japanese entertainer working under the stage name Gumi since 2022
- Gumi (組), the term for a yakuza group larger than a family (一家) but smaller than an association (会)
- Gumi, the name of the Megpoid mascot from the Vocaloid franchise
- Gumi (chattering lory), a chattering lory owned by former Capcom sound designer Hideaki Utsumi that has become famous through Internet memes

== See also ==
- Kumi (disambiguation)
