= Kumi =

Kumi may refer to:

- Kumi (name), a Japanese given name
- Ernest Kumi (1984–2025), Ghanaian politician
- Kumi District, a district in eastern Uganda
- Kumi Town, a town in eastern Uganda
  - Kumi University
- Kumi Kumi, an illegal liquor brewed in Kenya
- Kumi Lizard, a reptile that allegedly once lived in New Zealand
- Kumi odori, a form of Ryukyuan dance
- KUMI 415, a prison gang in the San Francisco Bay Area
- KUMI (FM), a defunct radio station (89.9 FM) formerly licensed to serve Ramona, California, U.S.
- KWPL-LD, a television station in Santa Fe, New Mexico, U.S., which held the call sign KUMI-LD in 2016

== See also ==
- Kumis, a fermented dairy product traditionally made from mare milk or donkey milk
- Gumi (disambiguation)
- Khumi (disambiguation)
