= Arlene Banas =

American actress

Arlene Banas is an American film, television, stage, and voice actress. In the animation world, she is known for her role as Carly Witwicky on The Transformers. Her stage roles include the female lead in the comedy Double Act (1991).

Early in her career, Banas appeared for 10 years as one of the Mighty Carson Art Players on The Tonight Show Starring Johnny Carson. She appeared on daytime soap operas including All My Children on ABC and Search for Tomorrow on CBS. She was a former Miss Chicago.

== Roles ==
- The Psychic (1968)–Alice Morgan
- Cutter (1972 TV movie)—Arlene French
- The Nurse Killer (1975 TV movie)—Christina
- The Washington Affair (1977)—Virginia Hawley, the alcoholic wife of a Washington bureaucrat played by Tom Selleck
- This Is the Life (TV series)—Audrey (ep: "Independence and '76", 1980)
- Rodeo Girl (1980 TV movie)—Joyce
- Eight Is Enough (TV series)—Connie Langston (ep.: "If the Glass Slipper Fits", 1981)
- The Transformers (TV series)—Carly Witwicky (recurring, 1985–1986)
- Dynasty—Receptionist (ep.: "The Man", 1985)
- Help Wanted: Kids (1986 TV movie)—Lady with Clipboard
- The Colbys (TV series)—Sharon (recurring, 1985–1986)
- Falcon Crest (TV series)—unknown (ep.: "Flesh and Blood", 1986)
- Second Serve (1986)-New Jersey woman reporter
- Our House (NBC TV series)—unknown (ep.: "Different Habits", 1986)
- Megazone 23 Part II (1987 OAV)—Dump (original English dub)
- Sledge Hammer! (TV series)—unknown (ep.: "To Live and Die on TV", 1986)
- Beauty and the Beast—Worker #3 (ep.: "Once Upon a Time", 1987)
- She's the Sheriff—Louise (ep.: "New Year's Eve", 1988)
- Freddy's Nightmares (TV series)—Dana's Mom (ep.: "Safe Sex", 1989)
- Double Your Pleasure (1989 TV movie)—unknown
- Rock Hudson (1990 TV biography)—Host
- Pizza Man (1991)—Marilyn Quayle
- Tekkaman Blade (1994 TV series)—unknown
- Phantom Quest Corp. (1995 OAV)—Suimei
- It's Like, You Know... (TV series)—Waitress (ep.: "The Long Goodbye", 1999)
- Gate Keepers (2001 TV series)—Additional Voices
- The Cookie Thief (2008)—Fiji Lady
