= Megazone 23 =

Japanese OVA series

- Cover to the NA/R1 Blu-Ray release from AnimeEigo for the entire OVA series. The cover shows the Garland mech.

メガゾーン23 (Megazōn Tsū Surī)
- Genre: Action, cyberpunk, mecha
- Created by: Noboru Ishiguro; Shinji Aramaki (Part III)
- Anime film

Megazone 23
- Directed by: Noboru Ishiguro
- Produced by: Toru Miura
- Written by: Hiroyuki Hoshiyama
- Music by: Shirō Sagisu
- Studio: Artland; Artmic
- Licensed by: NA: Streamline Pictures; ADV Films; AnimEigo
- Released: March 9, 1985
- Runtime: 80 minutes
- Anime film

Megazone 23 – Part II
- Directed by: Ichiro Itano
- Produced by: Toru Miura
- Written by: Hiroyuki Hoshiyama
- Music by: Shirō Sagisu
- Studio: Artland; Artmic
- Licensed by: NA: ADV Films; AnimEigo
- Released: May 30, 1986
- Runtime: 80 minutes
- Original video animation

Megazone 23 – Part III
- Directed by: Shinji Aramaki; Kenichi Yatagai
- Produced by: Toru Miura; Isamu Senda
- Written by: Emu Arii
- Music by: Keishi Urata
- Studio: AIC; Artmic
- Licensed by: NA: ADV Films; AnimEigo; UK: Manga Entertainment
- Released: September 28, 1989 – December 22, 1989
- Runtime: 50 minutes (each)
- Episodes: 2 (Note: Part III was released as a single 100-minute film in some international versions.)
- icon

Megazone 23 (Japanese: メガゾーン23, Hepburn: Megazōn Tsū Surī) is a Japanese animated mecha cyberpunk film series created by Noboru Ishiguro, written by Hiroyuki Hoshiyama and Emu Arii, and directed by Ishiguro, Ichiro Itano, Kenichi Yatagai, and Shinji Aramaki. The three-part theatrical anime movie and original video animation (OVA) series debuted in 1985. It was originally titled Omega Zone 23 (オメガゾーン23, Omega Zōn Tsū Surī) but the title was changed just before release.

The story follows Shougo Yahagi, a delinquent motorcyclist whose possession of a government prototype bike leads him to discover the truth about the city. Released on the VHS, Betamax, Laserdisc and VHD formats, the first part was a major commercial success in Japan upon release in 1985. It was also adapted into Robotech: The Movie (1986) in North America. The film's concept of a simulated reality has drawn comparisons to later films including Dark City (1998), The Matrix (1999) and Existenz (1999). It also inspired the video game 13 Sentinels: Aegis Rim (2019).

== Plot ==
Megazone 23's story is set in the far future of the human race, after, in the early 24th century, various environmental issues rendered Earth uninhabitable, forcing humanity to leave in several massive colony ships, the titular Megazones. The story itself follows the population of Megazone Two Three, based on 1985's Tokyo, Japan, where the population has forgotten their status as space travellers.

=== Part I and II ===
The first two parts occur roughly 500 years after humanity left Earth, as the government attempt to hack into the civic computer, Bahamut, for their city, in order to use the city's benevolent artificial intelligence, known as Eve, to influence the people to help them in a near-endless war against the Dezalg, advanced humans from a rival Megazone.

Thrown into this is Shogo Yahagi, after he is given ownership of a strange experimental bike by an old friend of his. Over the course of the story, he discovers how false his world is, and eventually makes contact with the EVE Program, who enlists him to assist humanity in any way he can. However, before he can do anything meaningful, the city's government become focused on the destruction of the Dezalg, and decide to terminate Shogo and Eve, who has fled into cyberspace. In the end, Eve manages to save Shogo and his friends, sending them in Bahamut's system core to Earth as the battling ships are destroyed by an automated lunar defense system called Adam, ending the conflict, at the price of an unknown number of people on both ships.

=== Part III ===
The third part occurs several centuries after this, with a hacker named Eiji Takanaka, who is scouted by a rebel group working against the teachings of a mysterious spiritual leader known as Bishop Won Dai. Sion, a high-ranking member of the rebel group, who work under the aegis of Orange Amusements, begins scouting Eiji, while also investigating a strange program called Project Heaven that the E=X Bureau, Won Dai's elite staff, are preparing. Sion manages to confront Eiji as Orange attempt to stop whatever Project Heaven is, and, badly wounded, instructs Eiji to go to the lowest point in the city, finding the real, centuries-old, EVE Tokimatsuri, who was left in suspended animation, meant to be awoken by Shogo Yahagi. She takes him to Bahamut, meeting the AI version of EVE from the previous two parts, while Sion manages to stop Orange from making the same mistake as several centuries before, using it to broadcast the E=X's master plan. In the end, Eiji and EVE confront Won Dai, and he is slain, revealing he is actually Shogo Yahagi as he dies. EVE heads to the ADAM moonbase to shut down and destroy it, while also taking out the city's computer, finally beginning the final part of the plan enacted around a millennium before, while Eiji heads off to meet with his girlfriend Ryo to begin his life anew.

== Cast ==
=== Part I ===
Part I cast
| Role | Japanese | English | |
| Role | Japanese | Streamline Pictures (1995) | ADV Films/Industrial Smoke & Mirrors (2004) |
|---|---|---|---|
| Shougo Yahagi | Masato Kubota | Bob Bergen | Vic Mignogna |
| Yui Takanaka | Maria Kawamura | Barbara Goodson | Allison Keith |
| B.D. | Kaneto Shiozawa | Gregory Snegoff | Andy McAvin |
| EVE | Kumi Miyasato | Iona Morris | Monica Rial |
| Mai Yumekano | Mayumi Shou | Lia Sargent | Sasha Paysinger |
| Tomomi Murashita | Mina Tominaga | Edie Mirman | Hilary Haag |
| Coco | Hitoshi Takagi | Mike Reynolds | John Swasey |
| Hiroki "Morley" Mori | Yuuji Mitsuya | Kerrigan Mahan | Kurt Stoll |
| Shigeru "Chombo" Tomota | Katsumi Toriumi | Kirk Thornton | Mark Laskowski |
| Producer | Kazuyuki Sogabe | Jeff Winkless | Mike MacRae |
| Senior officer | Daisuke Gouri | Russel Case | Dan Mackey |
| Nakao | Ikuya Sawaki | Steve Kramer | Mike Vance |
| Director General | Hisashi Katsuta | Tom Wyner | Mike Kleinhenz |
| Reporter | Hiromi Yokoi | Rebecca Forstadt | Tiffany Grant |
| Staff Officer 1 | Ken Yamaguchi | David Povall | Jason Douglas |
| Staff Officer 2 | Kōichi Hashimoto | Simon Prescott | Kevin Charles |
| Sergeant | Yoshio Kawai | David Zed | James Reed Faulkner |
| Prime Minister | Kousuke Tomita | | |
| Communications officers | Nobuo Tobita | David Povall; Jeff Winkless; Simon Prescott | Matt Culpepper; Stuart Krohn |
| Woman in BD's bed | Maya Okamoto | | Kelly Manison |
| Navigator | Ichirou Itano | Steve Kramer | Stuart Krohn |
| Eigen Yumekanou | Kiyoshi Kobayashi | Michael Forest | John Tyson |

=== Part II ===
Part II cast
| Role | Japanese | English | |
| Role | Japanese | International edition (1987) | ADV Films/ Industrial Smoke & Mirrors (2004) |
|---|---|---|---|
| Shougo Yahagi | Kazuki Yao | Johnny Winters | Vic Mignogna |
| Shougo Yahagi | Kazuki Yao | Kerrigan Mahan | Vic Mignogna |
| Yui Takanaka | Maria Kawamura | Suzy | Allison Keith |
| Yui Takanaka | Maria Kawamura | Barbara Goodson | Allison Keith |
| B.D. | Kaneto Shiozawa | Michael McConnohie | Andy McAvin |
| EVE | Kumi Miyasato | Diane Michelle | Monica Rial |
| Lightning | Shigeru Chiba | Tom Wyner | Jason Douglas |
| Lt. Yuuichirou Shiratori | Show Hayami | Lt. Richard Armstrong | John Gremillion |
| Lt. Yuuichirou Shiratori | Show Hayami | Gregory Snegoff | John Gremillion |
| Cindy | Akari Hibino | Melora Harte | Tiffany Grant |
| Rena | Yoshiko Sakakibara | Suzy London | Kelly Manison |
| Rakko | Tomohiro Nishimura | Rocky | Greg Ayres |
| Rakko | Tomohiro Nishimura | Bill Capizzi | Greg Ayres |
| Dump | Chika Sakamoto | Arlene Banas | Christine Auten |
| Garam | Kazuhiko Inoue | Gary | Chris Patton |
| Garam | Kazuhiko Inoue | Sam Fontana | Chris Patton |
| Guts | Kōzō Shioya | Jeff Winkless | George Manley |
| Jace | Issei Futamata | J.C. | Tad Hathaway |
| Jace | Issei Futamata | Jeff Winkless | Tad Hathaway |
| Eigen Yumekanou | Banjō Ginga | Richland | John Tyson |
| Eigen Yumekanou | Banjō Ginga | Michael Forest | John Tyson |
| Air Grane FX-101 Admiral | Kazuo Oka | Theodore Lehmann | Phil Ross |
| Nakao | Kōichi Hashimoto | Nichols | Mike Vance |
| Nakao | Kōichi Hashimoto | Steve Kramer | Mike Vance |
| Woodsman leader | Takurou Kitagawa | Tom Wyner | Gene Tognacci |

=== Part III ===
Part III cast
| Role | Japanese | English | |
| Role | Japanese | Manga Entertainment/ World Wide Group (1995) | ADV Films/ Industrial Smoke & Mirrors (2004) |
|---|---|---|---|
| Narrator | Yumi Tōma | Peter Marinker | Tiffany Grant |
| Eiji Takanaka | Takeshi Kusao | Michael McGhee | Jay Hickman |
| EVE | Saki Takaoka | Annemarie Lawless | Monica Rial |
| Ryou Narahara | Hiroko Kasahara | Larissa Murray | Jessica Boone |
| Dr. Jakob Halm | Matoko Ataka | Adam Matalon | Illich Guardiola |
| Dr. Shimuka Brody | Mika Doi | Laurel Lefkow | Shelley Calene-Black |
| Lisa | Maria Kawamura | Jana Carpenter | Anita Vasquez |
| Zion | Kōichi Yamadera | Stuart Milligan | Tommy Drake |
| Bud | Nozomu Sasaki | Walter Lewis | Spike Spencer |
| Lester | Kazuki Yao | Alan Marriott | Kevin Brown |
| Drakman | Osamu Saka | William Roberts | John Swasey |
| Miki | Yuriko Fuchizaki | Julia Brahms | Michelle Maulsby |
| Akira | Mitsuo Iwata | Martin McDougall | Kevin Corn |
| Edoval | Kiyoyuki Yanada | Peter Woodward | Victor Carsrud |
| Bishop Won Dai | Kōji Nakata | Robert Glenister | Chris Patton |
| Clark | Masato Kubota | | Ryan Worthington |
| Dominique | Megumi Hayashibara | | Tiffany Grant |

== Production ==
Megazone 23 was conceived as a 12-episode television series set to air on Fuji TV, but it was changed to a direct-to-video project after the sponsors withdrew their support mid-production. According to Noboru Ishiguro, the end result was a "compilation movie" of already produced episodes. Megazone was not conceived as a multi-part story. As such, the original release of "Part I" lacks the subtitle that has been added to subsequent re-releases.

Original mecha designs for the series were created by Shinji Aramaki, while character designs were made by Toshihiro Hirano and Haruhiko Mikimoto, who would provide Eve Tokimatsuri's character designer for all three parts. For "Part II", Yasuomi Umetsu was the character designer, and for "Part III", Hiroyuki Kitazume took over.

The original planned title was "Omega City 23", then "Vanity City" and "Omega Zone 23", but trademark issues compelled the producers to a title change. The number "23" was originally a reference to the 23 municipal wards of Tokyo. In the retroactive continuity established by Part III, the number refers to the 23rd man made city-ship, with Megazone 1 named "Big Apple". However, the title is pronounced "Megazone Two Three" as referenced by several reference books and anime magazines published during the release of the series, the Japanese Wikipedia entry, and even within the series itself in "Day of Liberation".

A 2017 ad on the Japanese crowdfunding platform Campfire listed that AIC is working on a remake and a new project in the series. Soon after, AIC announced that the project would be a remake of the series titled Megazone 23 SIN, and a sequel titled Megazone XI would also be in production with character designer Masahiko Komino. At AnimeJapan 2019, AIC announced that only Parts I and II of the original Megazone series would be remade in the reboot series. On March 25, 2023, AIC announced that development on the reboot series started under the codename "G-PROJECT" and that it is currently in its planning phase.

== Alternative versions ==
Footage from "Part I" was combined with Super Dimension Cavalry Southern Cross by Carl Macek to create Robotech: The Movie in 1986. The new cut reestablished Shogo's character as Mark Landry and included a new ending animated by Tatsunoko specifically for Robotech: The Movie.

== Releases ==
The first part was released on the VHS, Betamax, Laserdisc and VHD formats in 1985.

Megazone Part II International was released on laserdisc in Japan, which included an English-language voice cast that Carl Macek had orchestrated. The consequent adaptation rewrote Shogo as "Johnny Winters" and Yui as "Sue". This creates a continuity error, as the name that appears on her bike helmet remains unchanged. The International Edition also added a narration to the exclusive alternate footage from Robotech: The Movie; the retooled scene became an introduction to Part 2. It was not included in the out-of-print DVD Box Set, but was available as a bonus item to those who purchased all three installments individually. The International Edition was also released as a Region 2 DVD bundled with the Limited Edition of the PS3 game Megazone 23: Aoi Garland.

Macek's Streamline Pictures produced and released an unedited dubbed version of Part 1 to VHS in 1995, which was released to DVD in 1998 by Image Entertainment. Streamline also planned on releasing the other two parts, but was unable due to a dispute with distributor Orion Pictures. Manga Entertainment released a dubbed version of Part 3 in the United Kingdom.

In 2004, ADV Films released each installment of the series with a newly produced English dub and the original Japanese language track. The 2004 editions also contained extensive liner notes on the development of Megazone 23. ADV released a complete collection in 2007. With the closure of ADV in 2009, the series was out-of-print in the US. Megazone 23 was remastered onto Blu-ray in Japan, and released on November 27, 2015.

AnimEigo launched a Kickstarter campaign for the release of the series in August 2019, similar to Bubblegum Crisis one before, and released the Megazone 23 Omega Edition Blu-ray Box in March 2021. It includes the International Edition, Streamline, and ADV English dubs, with only the Manga English dub omitted.

== Reception and legacy ==
The first part was a major commercial success in Japan upon release in 1985, selling over 216,000 copies in Japan, mostly to video rental stores. At a price of ¥7,800, the first part grossed approximately ¥1.7 billion from video sales in Japan.

The anime received a positive English-language review from Australian magazine Hyper in 1996, calling it "Excellent" and rating it 8 out of 10. The reviewer said it "is one of the more original" sci-fi anime "to have hit these shores" and that, despite "a smaller budget", the art is "beautifully designed and finished". They said it is "a black and cynical look at mankind and technology" which makes it "perfect Cyberpunk fare".

=== Influence ===
Publisher ADV has compared and found many similarities between the Megazone 23 series and The Matrix (1999), but The Wachowskis have denied it was an influence during the development of the film series. Megazone 23 has also drawn comparisons to the films Dark City (1998) and Existenz (1999). It also heavily influenced the video game 13 Sentinels: Aegis Rim (2019).

=== Video games ===
Character and vehicles from Megazone 23 appear in Super Robot Wars D for the Game Boy Advance.

In 2007, a video game based on the series, entitled Megazone 23: Aoi Garland, was released in Japan for the PlayStation 3.
