= Kyoto University of Education =

Coordinates: 34°57′0″N 135°46′23″E

- 京都教育大学
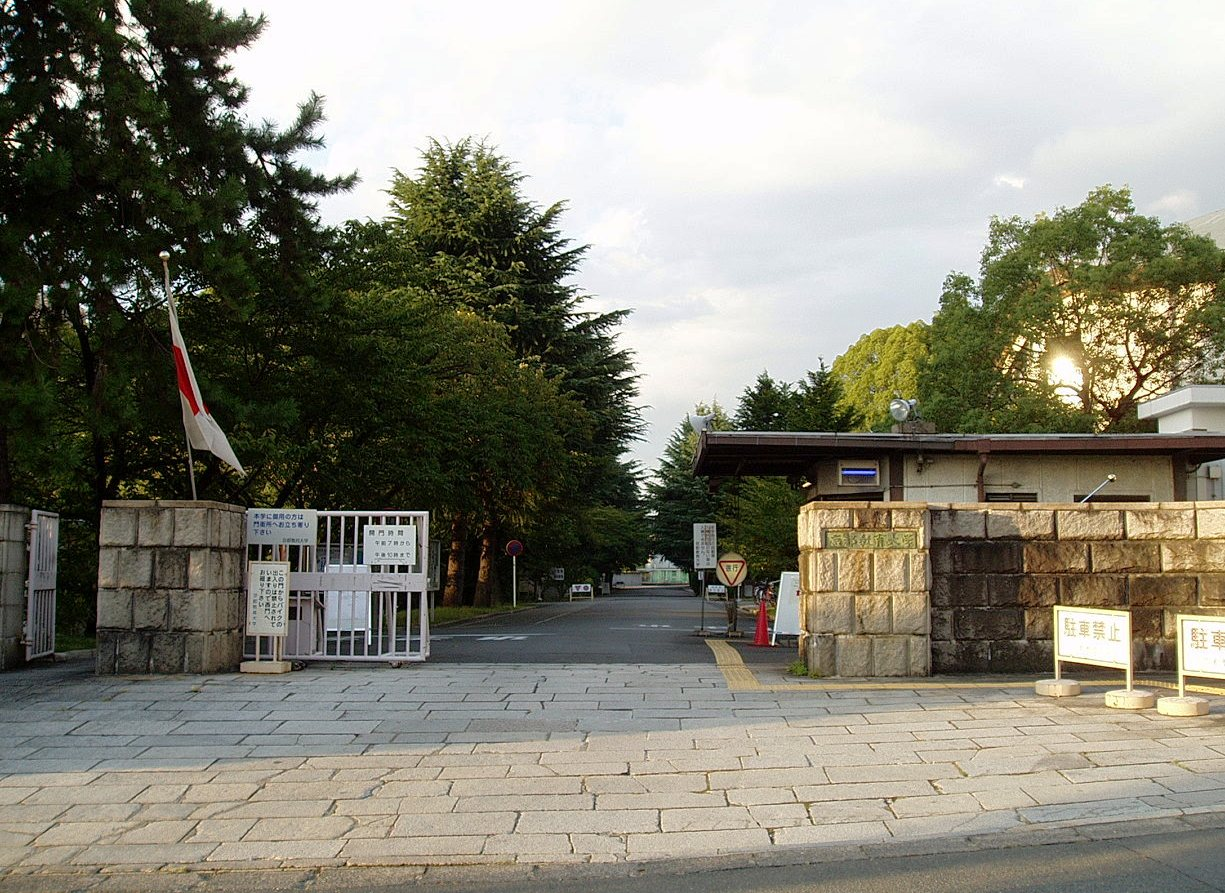
- The main gate
- Type: Public (National)
- Established: 1949
- Undergraduates: 1,696 (May 2011)
- Postgraduates: 368 (May 2011)
- Location: Kyoto, Kyoto, Japan
- Campus: Urban
- Website: www.kyokyo-u.ac.jp

The Kyoto University of Education (京都教育大学, Kyōto kyōiku daigaku) is a national university in Kyoto, Japan. The school's predecessor was founded in 1876, and it was chartered as a university in 1949.

== History ==
The Kyoto University of Education was established in 1949 from the merger of Kyōto shihan gakkō and Kyōto seinen shihan gakkō.

== Athletics ==
The university is a member of the Kansai Collegiate American Football League, where its team Grampus competes.

=== Controversy ===
In 2009, 6 students of the Kyoto University of Education were arrested for gang-raping a 19-year-old woman in a Kyoto bar. All 6 students were members of sports teams at the university, including the American football team. The university suspended the six students indefinitely at the end of March 2009. Mitsuyo Terada resigned as president due to the scandal and he was replaced by Kimiko Itō.

== Notable alumni ==
- Tetsunosuke Kushida, music composer
