= Megazone 23: Aoi Garland =

2007 video game

- Developer: Compile Heart
- Publisher: Compile Heart
- Platform: PlayStation 3
- Release: JP: September 13, 2007
- Genre: RPG
- Mode: Single player

Megazone 23: Aoi Garland (メガゾーン23 青いガーランド, Megazone 23: Blue Garland) is a Japanese video game based on the anime series Megazone 23. The game was released for the PlayStation 3 on September 13, 2007, in Japan by Compile Heart. The game is available in two different packages "Original" and "Over Seas Edition".

The game takes place 21 years after the end of Part 1 of Megazone 23 in an alternate continuity to part 2.

== Gameplay ==
The game is divided into three parts, which consist of Adventure, Cockpit and Battle. Depending on the choices made with various characters during conversations, different events may take place.

== Over Seas Edition ==
Over Seas Edition is a limited edition print by Compile Heart to be released along with its original copies of the game. This edition comes bundled with a game setting guidebook with full-color artwork and a DVD, "Megazone 23 INTERNATIONAL PART II" (Region 2) -- the full movie of Part II with the original English dub, using Harmony Gold voice actors, complete with the intro of Part I's alternate (non-canonical) ending with footage used in Robotech: The Movie and a narrated summary of the (canonical) events of Part I.
