= Kumi (name) =

- Gender: Unisex

Origin
- Meaning: Different meanings depending on the kanji used.

Other names
- Related names: Kumiko

Kumi (くみ, クミ) is a given name.

== Written forms in Japanese ==
Kumi can be written using different kanji characters and can mean:

- 組, "group, party, pair, band, class"

as a given name:

- 久美, "long time, beauty" (also read Hisami)
- 久実, "long time, fruit"
- 来未, "come, not yet"
- 来実, "come, fruit"
- 九美, "nine, beauty"
- 九海, "nine seas"

The given name can also be written in hiragana or katakana.

== People ==
People with the given name Kumi:

- Kumi (born 1976), vocalist of the Japanese band Love Psychedelico
- Kumi Araki (荒木 久美; born 1965), Japanese long-distance runner
- Kumi Koda (倖田 來未; born 1982), Japanese pop and neo soul singer
- Kumi Miyasato (宮里 久美; born 1969), Japanese former idol, singer and voice actress
- Kumi Mizuno (水野 久美; born 1937), Japanese actress
- Kumi Mori (毛利 久美; born 1985), Japanese team handball goalkeeper
- Kumi Naidoo (born 1965), South African human rights activist and head of Greenpeace
- Kumi Nakada (中田 久美; born 1965), former professional volleyball player
- Kumi Otoshi (大利 久美; born 1985), Japanese race walker
- Kumi Sakuma (佐久間 紅美; born 1976), Japanese voice actress
- Kimi Sasaki (佐々木 久美; born 1996), Japanese singer
- Kumi Sugai (菅井 汲; 1919–1996), Japanese painter and printmaker
- Kumi Taguchi (actress) (田口 久美), Japanese-American actress
- Kumi Taguchi (journalist) (田口 久美; born 1975), Australian television broadcaster and presenter
- Kumi Tanioka (谷岡 久美; born 1974), Japanese video game music composer
- Kumi Yagami (矢神 久美; born 1994), Japanese former idol of the idol group SKE48
- Kumi Yamada (山田 久美; born 1967), Japanese women's professional shogi player
- Kumi Yamashita (山下 工美; born 1968), Japanese artist
- Kumi Yokoyama (横山 久美; born 1993), Japanese football striker

== Fictional characters ==
with the given name Kumi

- Kumi, a ladybug in the cartoon series Beat Bugs
- Kumi, a fox Gacha pet in the Korean online video game Grand Chase
- Kumi, a character in the popular children's doll franchise Bratz
- Kumi Mashiba, a character in the manga and anime series Fighting Spirit
- Kumi Ōkubo, a character in the Japanese fighting game series Asuka 120% Burning Festival
- Kumi Hayami, a character in the magical girl anime series Magical Fairy Persia
- Kumi Kawamura, a character in the manga series Alien Nine
- Kumi Hirose, a character in the role-playing game Revelations: Persona
- Kumi Sugimoto, a character in the manga and anime series Captain Tsubasa
- Kumi Mashiba, a character in the anime series (Makunouchi Ippo's love interest) Hajime no Ippo
- Kazeumi Kumi (Bukubukuchagama), a character in the light novel, anime And manga series (Overlord)
- Kumi Kibashi, a character in Gal*Gun!

== See also ==
- Kumi (disambiguation)
