= Kimiko Suzuki =

Japanese architect (1929–1992)

- Born: 1929
- Died: 1992 (aged 62–63)
- Citizenship: Japanese
- Education: Japan's Women University
- Occupation: Architect
- Known for: The first graduate of Japan Women's University with a degree in the housing studies program.

Kimiko Suzuki (1929–1992) was a Japanese architect. She is the first graduate at Japan Women's University with a degree in the housing studies program.

== Life and work ==
When Suzuki graduated there was an economic downturn following World War II. Instead of starting her career at an architecture firm, she had her first job in a publishing company and was promised the same salary as a man. Suzuki was able to find a position in an architecture office after her marriage. She later became an independent architect and worked on projects that included residential designs, a kindergarten, and a medical clinic.

She designed the Susume Abe's residence in 1967. Abe is known as a critic of the Japanese education system. Suzuki died at 63 because of an illness. A small collection of her works can be found at International Archive of Women in Architecture at Newman Library, Virginia Tech.
