= Kimiko Itō (pedagogue) =

Japanese academic

- 位藤 紀美子

President of the Kyoto University of Education
- In office 1 October 2009 – 31 March 2016
- Preceded by: Mitsuyo Terada

Personal details
- Born: 1945 (age 80–81) Ehime Prefecture, Japan
- Occupation: Pedagogue
- Awards: Order of the Sacred Treasure (2021)

Academic background
- Education: Hiroshima University

Academic work
- Discipline: Language pedagogy
- Sub-discipline: Japanese language
- Institutions: Kyoto University of Education; Biwako-Gakuin University

Kimiko Itō (位藤 紀美子, Itō Kimiko; born 1945) is a Japanese pedagogue who specialises in language pedagogy for the Japanese language. Born in Ehime Prefecture, she spent over thirty-five years as part of the staff at Kyoto University of Education. After spending months as a professor at Biwako-Gakuin University, she returned to the Kyoto University of Education to become president after Mitsuyo Terada resigned as a result of a sexual violence scandal involving the university's students, serving from 2009 until 2016.

== Biography ==
Kimiko Itō was born in 1945 in Ehime Prefecture. She was educated at the Hiroshima University, graduating from the Faculty of Education in 1968. In 1970, she received her Master of Education at the Hiroshima University Graduate School of Education and returned to the Faculty of Education as an assistant. After she left the Graduate School's doctoral programme in 1972, she moved to the Kyoto University of Education, where she began teaching as a lecturer in 1973. She was promoted to assistant professor in 1976 and to professor in 1990, remaining at the university until March 2009. She later worked at Biwako-Gakuin University, where she became a professor at their Faculty of Education and Welfare in April 2009.

In September 2009, she was elected as the new president of the Kyoto University of Education, replacing sports scientist Mitsuyo Terada, who resigned as a result of a sexual violence scandal involving the university's students, and she took office starting on 1 October 2009. She stepped down from this position on 31 March 2016.

As an academic, she specialises in language pedagogy for the Japanese language.

She was awarded the Order of the Sacred Treasure in 2021.

As of 2021, she lived in Ōtsu, Shiga.
