= Debra Kimiko Nishida =

Geologist

Debra Kimiko Nishida was a geologist at Dome Petroleum and a member of the Canadian Energy Geoscience Association since 1980. Dome Petroleum Limited was a petroleum company that was active from 1950 until 1988, when it was purchased by Amoco, which is a chain of gas stations that has been operating in the United States since 1998.

== Publications and contributions ==
Nishidas' most recent record of employment in the CEGA database was with Encana in 2002, which was a Canadian petroleum company that was active from 2002 until 2020. The company moved from Canada to Denver in 2019 and rebranded its name to Ovintiv.

The AAPG Rocky Mountain Section Meeting, held in September 2005, included Nishida on the organizing committee for a field trip to Jonah Field in Wyoming. This field trip was organized together with Brandy Butler and Randi Martinsen. This event was sponsored by the EnCana Oil & Gas (USA). This field trip was part of the geological field trips program at this AAPG Rocky Mountain Section Meeting.

Nishida has made several publications throughout her career in Geology. Her published works include:

- A Famennian Stromatoporoid Patch Reef in the Wabamun Group, West-Central Alberta, Canada. Debra K. Nishida CSPG Special Publications
- Stromatoporoid-Algal-Facies Hydrocarbon Traps in Upper Devonian (Famennian) Wabamun Group, North-Central Alberta, Canada. Debra K. Nishida, J. W. Murray, C.W. Stearn AAPG Bulletin
- Jonah Field, Sublette County, Wyoming: Where has it been and where is it going? Dean P. Dubois, Debra K. Nishida, Aaron J. Fisher, Nancy J. House Rocky Mountain Association of Geologists
- Facies Proportion Curves Establish a Stratigraphic Framework for the Lance Formation, Jonah Field, Wyoming. Barbara Luneau, Dean DuBois, and Debra Nishida (2004). AAPG Search and Discovery, abstract 90030.

== Research and contributions ==
"A Famennian Stromatoporoid Patch Reef in the Wabamun Group, West-Central Alberta, Canada" was a publication that was funded by Dome Petroleum. Debra studied the Devonian (Famennian) Wabamun Group environment in Normandville, Alberta.

The Normandville field was discovered while drilling the area for oil, and subsequent drilling led to the discovery of the Wabamun oil reserves in the region.

Nishida conducted studies of the Stromatoporoid in the area and found that higher wells within the reef were oil producing, and lower wells within the reef were water-wet. It was found that the fauna that make up the reef patch are survivors of the Frasnian-Famennian crisis that occurred over 372 million years ago and caused the mass extinction of 50% of all species.

The reef that Nishida was studying was significant as it indicated that other Famennian patch reefs may exist and be potential new targets for oil drilling. She conducted biostratigraphic studies of the area, showing that the stromatoporoid reefs are different, slightly younger in age, than the Crossfield member of the Wabamun.

Debra Nishida's work in geology, especially her research on the patch reefs and hydrocarbon traps in the Wabamun Group, contributed valuable insights to the petroleum industry and our understanding of ancient ecosystems.

Nishida conducted a study on the Lance Formation in the Jonah Field of Wyoming in 2004, in collaboration with Barbara Luneau and Dean DuBois. In this research, more than 3,000 feet of heterogeneous fluvial sediments were studied. These include channel, crevasse splay, and floodplain sediments. Since each sand body was different from another in the field, the correlations among wells could not be established using normal approaches. The study used statistical methods to study patterns in how different types of rocks were ditributed underground. This helped them compare geological layers across the feild and better understand how different parts of the gas and oil reservoirs might be connected.

== Work with the American Association of Petroleum Geologists ==
Nishida has assisted the American Association of Petroleum Geologists (AAPG) in accomplishing their goals and mission by serving on several committees. From 2001 to 2003, Nishida was a member of the AAPG Committee on Conventions. The Committee on Conventions is tasked with "planning, coordinating and conducting AAPG annual conventions and AAPG international conferences." The committee on conventions also make recommendations to the AAPG executive on the locations, and timing of annual meetings and international conferences. Nishida also served on the International Regions Committee from 2003 to 2004 and again from 2008 to 2009. The AAPG International Regions Committee's mission is to represent the AAPG as a global organization, making recommendations to the executive, and the AAPG House of Delegates on how to enhance the AAPG international membership and international services. The International Regions Committee also provides a forum between the AAPG international regions, AAPG committees, and US sections. Nishida also served as a member on the Imperial Barrel Award Committee since 2012.

Nishida also previously served as president of the AAPG Canada International Region.

== Awards ==
Nishida was the Canadian Energy Geoscience Association recipient of the Volunteer Tracks Award in 2001
