= Kumiko Tanaka-Ishii =

Kumiko Tanaka-Ishii is a computational linguist and a professor in Research Center for Advanced Science and Technology at the University of Tokyo, Japan. She is the author of Semiotics of Programming, an award-winning book semiotically analyzing computer programs along three axes: models of signs, kinds of signs, and systems of signs.

== Personal ==
Tanaka-Ishii received her doctorate from the University of Tokyo in 1997. In 1995, before completing her PhD, she was a visiting researcher at Laboratoire d'Informatique pour la Mécanique et les Sciences de l'Ingénieur (LIMSI) at the National Center for Scientific Research (CNRS) in Paris, where she worked on semantic proximity matrices for the Japanese language. In 2010 she was awarded both the Suntory Prize for Social Sciences and Humanities and the Okawa Publications Prize for her book, Semiotics of Programming. The book has been critically and favorably reviewed in Linguistic & Philosophical Investigations, Cognitive Technology Journal, and Semiotica.

== Publications ==
- Tanaka-Ishii, Kumiko (2021). Statistical Universals of Language: Mathematical Chance vs. Human Choice. Springer. ISBN 9783030593766.
- Kimura, Daisuke; Tanaka-Ishii, Kumiko (2014). "Study on Constants of Natural Language Texts". Journal of Natural Language Processing. 21 (4): 877–895. doi:10.5715/jnlp.21.877DOI is for English translation, which appeared 3 years after original article.
- MacKenzie, I. Scott; Tanaka-Ishii, Kumiko, eds. (2007). Text Entry Systems Mobility, Accessibility, Universality. Amsterdam: Boston. ISBN 978-0123735911.
- Tanaka-Ishii, Kumiko (2010). Semiotics of Programming. New York: Cambridge University Press. ISBN 9780521736275.

== Awards and recognition ==
- Suntory Prize for Social Sciences and Humanities
- Okawa Publications Prize
- 2011 Best Journal Paper Award, Association for Natural Language Processing: "A Study on Constants of Natural Language Texts"
