= Kumi Lizard =

The Kumi Lizard is a purported reptile, possibly a giant monitor lizard, which allegedly once lived in New Zealand.

In New Zealand Mysteries, author Robyn Gosset refers to a sighting of a Kumi in 1898 by a Maori bushman. Its length was estimated at 1.5 metres. In the first edition of the book, Gosset refers to several more accounts of the lizard which are absent from the second edition. These include an account from captain James Cook, who was told by Maori in Queen Charlotte Sound that huge, arboreal lizards were present in the surrounding bushland, and that they were greatly feared, as well as a sighting from 1875 of a large lizard washed up in a flooded Hokianga river and the discovery of bones possibly from the animal that same year.

More recent reports both come from 1898, one describing a large reptile seen near Gisborne, New Zealand, the other a huge creature akin to a monitor lizard which advanced toward a bushman in Mount Arowhana before retreating into a Rata tree. Although the animal itself was not spotted again, photographs of its footprints were taken.

== See also ==
- Taniwha
