= Gumi, Nepal =

Mehelkuna, Nepal मेहेलकुना
- Village development committee
- Location in Nepal
- Coordinates: 28.50°N 81.86°E
- Country: Nepal
- Zone: Bheri Zone
- District: Surkhet District

Population (1991)
  - Total: 5,683
- Time zone: UTC+5:45 (Nepal Time)

Mehelkuna is a village development committee in Surkhet District in the Bheri Zone of mid-western Nepal. At the time of the 1991 Nepal census it had a population of 5683 people living in 965 individual households.
