= Kumiko (bar) =

- Interactive map of Kumiko

Restaurant information
- Established: 2018
- Chef: Julia Momosé
- Food type: Japanese
- Location: 630 West Lake Street, Chicago, Illinois, 60661, United States
- Coordinates: 41.8859°N 87.6441°W
- Website: Official website

Kumiko is a Japanese dining bar (ダイニングバー) in the West Loop, Chicago.

In 2024, Kumiko was ranked tenth among North America's 50 Best Bars.

It won the award for Outstanding Bar at the 2025 James Beard Awards.

Kumiko has consistently been mentioned in the Michelin Guide as a Best Japanese Restaurant in Chicago

== Location ==
Kumiko is located at 630 West Lake Street in Chicago's West Loop neighborhood.

== History ==
Kumiko opened in 2018 under the direction of bartender and restaurateur Julia Momosé. The establishment is named after kumiko, a traditional Japanese woodworking technique involving intricate latticework assembled without nails, which also inspired the bar's interior design.

Originally focused primarily on cocktails, Kumiko expanded its culinary program over time, evolving into a dining bar emphasizing the pairing of food and beverages. In the mid-2020s, Momosé assumed the role of executive chef, further incorporating Japanese culinary traditions into the menu.

== Cuisine and menu ==
Kumiko offers both an à la carte menu and a seasonal tasting menu. The cuisine blends Japanese techniques with contemporary influences, featuring dishes such as Japanese potato salad, chicken karaage, milk toast, and variations on Japanese curry. The tasting menu changes regularly and reflects elements of kaiseki-style dining.

The beverage program emphasizes Japanese whisky, shochu, sake, and carefully prepared cocktails, including highballs and omakase-style drink pairings tailored to individual guests.

== Recognition ==
In addition to its James Beard Award and ranking among North America's 50 Best Bars, Kumiko has received international recognition. In 2025, it was named World's Best Bar at the Spirited Awards. Coverage of the award described Kumiko as a leader in contemporary cocktail culture, highlighting its hospitality, attention to detail, and integration of food and drink.
