= Vocaloid novels =

Literary genre

Vocaloid novels are prose works based on, adapted from, or otherwise inspired by songs created using Vocaloid and related singing-synthesizer software. The term is commonly used for Japanese novels that expand the narratives, characters, settings, or themes of Vocaloid songs into longer-form fiction. Many such works are associated with individual songs, song series, albums, or multimedia franchises. In Japan the consensus is that this kind of literature is "girl's literature".

== History ==
Commercial publication of Vocaloid novels became prominent in Japan during the early 2010s. The first novel of its kind was The Daughter of Evil: Clôture of Yellow, from the multimedia franchise Evillious Chronicles made by mothy, published by PHP Institute in August 2010. The Daughter of Evil and The Servant of Evil, which had originally been produced using the Vocaloid voicebanks Kagamine Rin and Kagamine Len, were the direct source for the novel. National Diet Library's International Library of Children's Literature highlighted how The Daughter of Evil: Clôture of Yellow was an embodied the idea of the overall genre.

As time went on new additional novels were categorized under the label, such as Kagerou Daze -in a daze- (released on 30 May 2012), Confession Rehearsal (1 February 2014), Mozaik Role —high & melancholy— (31 May 2014) and Nisoku Hokou (13 February 2015).

Back in 2013, the news outlet MANTAWEB stated that the genre was becoming increasingly popular. In 2014, ITMedia made similar remarks, adding that it was increasingly becoming an established genre. In 2020 Real Sound noted a second wave of the phenomenon.

== Genre characteristics ==
The Japan Society of Publishing Studies subsequently discussed Vocaloid novels as part of the diversification of Japanese "girls' fiction". Its 2017 report also describes the genre as novels based on Vocaloid songs and connects them with the changing forms of contemporary young-adult fiction. A Meiji University study specifically describes Kagerou Daze as a Vocaloid novel originating from songs produced using Vocaloid and notes its subsequent development into manga and anime as proof of the multimedia characteristic of the genre. The presence of Vocaloid characters is not strictly necessary in the genre, the connection to the source music is more important. Another unique characteristic of this genre is dark, exaggerated worlds, exaggerated emotions, anguish, grotesque elements, and so-called “chūnibyō/otaku”-style settings.
