= Miu-Khumi tribe =

Tribe of Mizo people

The Miu-Khumi people are one of the Chin tribes, native to Paletwa sub-division in the Chin State, and Akyab District in Arakan State of Myanmar.

== Variations ==
The Mara and Lusei tribes called them Matu, Arakanese and Mogh called them Kha-mi or Kha-mui. They called themselves Kumi, pronounced as Khumi. British writers used Mru or Mro for Miu. Miu are also known as Myo. Mizo people called them Miria. The Miu and Khumi tribes mixed with each other, and are now considered a single tribe.

== Demography ==
Total population of Miu-Khumi is 20,682 in 1901, of which 13,300 are pure Khumi.
