= Kumi Miyasato =

Japanese pop singer and voice actor (born 1969)

Kumi Miyasato 宮里久美
- Born: Miyasato Kumi 宮里久美; 1 October 1969 (age 56); Sagamihara, Japan
- Origin: Kanagawa Prefecture; Japan
- Genres: Pop
- Occupations: Singer, Voice actor
- Years active: 1984–1990
- Label: Victor Records

Kumi Miyasato (Japanese: 宮里久美, Hepburn: Miyasato Kumi) is a former Japanese idol, singer and voice actress who was active in the mid-to-late 1980s.

== Early life ==
Miyasato was born on October 1, 1969, in Sagamihara, Kanagawa Prefecture, the oldest child to a younger sister (by one year) and a younger brother (by three years). She showed interest in music from a young age, during her Junior High School she said one of her favorite school subjects was music education, she had dreamed to become a singer (and alternatively a kindergarten teacher), and she idolized Momoe Yamaguchi.

== Career ==
In 1984, she participated in a talent scout competition set up by Horipro and was one of the winners in the Tokyo Preliminary Tournament. She initially entered Horipro as a model, however she quickly showed interest in the Megazone 23 OVA project and decided to audition for the role of Tokimatsuri EVE. Her management and OVA producers were impressed by her singing abilities so much she passed the audition and received the role for EVE. Much of EVE's choreography (choreographed by Toru Miura) was video-taped by Kumi herself performing it, and the animators using the video as a reference. On February 5, 1985, she debuted as a singer with the single Senakagoshi ni Sentimental as a tie-in song to the Megazone 23 OVA that would release the month later starring herself. The release put her in line with the likes of other singer-seiyuu idols such as Mari Ijima. In October of that year, she released her first album Hitomi de Whispering (alternatively titled I Only Have Eyes For You).
