= Kumiko Nishioka =

Japanese mathematician

Kumiko Nishioka (西岡 久美子, Nishioka Kumiko, born 1954) is a Japanese mathematician at Keio University. She specializes in transcendental numbers, and is known for her research related to the theory of Mahler functions and Painlevé transcendents. In 1996 she published the first comprehensive text on transcendence of Mahler functions, Mahler Functions and Transcendence, extending and generalizing Mahler's method. Her husband Keiji Nishioka is also a mathematician, and a coauthor.
