= Sugar (trio) =

Japanese idol trio

- Sugar in 1982. From left to right: Kumiko Nagasawa, Miki Kasamatsu, and Kimiko Tokumoto.

Background information
- Also known as: シュガー
- Genres: J-Pop
- Years active: 1981–1987
- Labels: For Life; Sound Scale
- Past members: Miki Kasamatsu; Kumiko Nagasawa; Kimiko Tokumoto

Sugar (Japanese: シュガー) were a Japanese idol trio formed in 1981 by Miki Kasamatsu, Kumiko Nagasawa, and Kimiko Mohri. Originally formed as a band with all three members playing instruments, the group slowly shifted away from use of their instruments an becoming a vocal group by the latter half of their career. They attracted attention with their debut single "Wedding Bell," which charted at No. 2 on the Oricon charts.

== History ==
Kumiko Nagasawa and Kimiko Mohri were junior high classmates at Yokohama City Terao Junior High School and previously formed the band Karinto (かりんとう) at Kanagawa Prefectural Tsurumi High School, where Mohri attended. The duo also participated in the 14th Yamaha Popular Song Contest in 1977 before joining the band Cutie Panchos when it was formed in December 1978.

After Cutie Panchos lost the Popcon Grand Prix in 1980, the pair left the band and created Sugar with Miki Kasamatsu, who had met them after, in 1981. They named themselves Sugar as it was the opposite of salt as well as to show their "sweet voices." On November 21, 1981, they released their debut single, "Wedding Bell" on For Life Music. That same year, they released their debut album, Sugar Dream.

In 1982, they participated in the 33rd Kōhaku Uta Gassen with the Red Group. In 1987, the group disbanded.

== Members ==
=== Miki Kasamatsu ===
Miki Kasamatsu (born July 15, 1960) attended Kanagawa Prefectural Tsurumi High School before graduating at Nihon University Tsurugaoka High School. She was the keyboardist of the band. Kasamatsu is now a freelance composer, creating songs for video games and anime.

=== Kumiko Nagasawa ===
Kumiko Nagasawa (born July 15, 1960) was the guitarist of the group. After the disbandment of the band, she began working as a designer at Being Inc. She restarted her music career as a solo musician and now also leads a band called Kumi's Band since 2015, which includes members of Cutie Panchos.

Nagasawa also runs the Sugar Project, which aims to protect dogs.

=== Kimiko Tokumoto ===
Kimiko Tokumoto (née Mohri, September 29, 1960 – April 7, 1990) was the leader and bassist of the group.

On April 6, 1990, Tokumoto felt labor pains and went to the doctor with her sister, Mamoru Mohri, as her husband was abroad on a business trip. When they got there, the heartbeat of the child could no longer be confirmed and was she told that she suffered from stillbirth. They decided to stay at the hospital overnight and leave the next day, but during their stay, her sister noticed that Tokumoto was not breathing and was taken immediately by another paramedic. Tokumoto died while being transferred, with the cause being unknown.

== Discography ==
Sugar discography
- Studio albums: 4
- Compilation albums: 3
- Singles: 11

=== Studio albums ===
| Year | Title | Label |
|---|---|---|
| 1981 | Sugar Dream | For Life Music |
| 1982 | Coffee Break | For Life Music |
| 1983 | Sugar Bean | For Life Music |
| 1985 | 29:00 AM | For Life Music |
| June 1987 | Station Nari | Sound Scale |

=== Compilation albums ===
| Year | Title | Label |
|---|---|---|
| 1983 | Faces | For Life Music |
| 1987 | Sugar | For Life Music |
| 2004 | Golden Best | For Life Music |
| 1989 | U.S.A. | Sound Scale |

=== Singles ===
| Year | A-Side | B-Side | Album | Label |
|---|---|---|---|---|
| 1981 | "Wedding Bell" (ウエディング・ベル) | "Shinsen Bishō On'na" (新鮮微笑女) | Sugar Dream | For Life Music |
| 1982 | "Abanchūru wa Rukkusu-shidai" (アバンチュールはルックスしだい) | "Shin'nyū Shain to Torabayu (A.M.9 To P.M.5)" (新入社員ととらばーゆ（A.M.9 to P.M.5）) | Non-album single | For Life Music |
| 1982 | "Watashi ￮ ni ho Rika Hito" (私○にほリカ人) | "An non Sutorīto" (an non ストリート) | Non-album single | For Life Music |
| 1982 | "Misty Night" | "Uwakina Benkyō Gāru" (浮気な勉強ガール) | Coffee Break | For Life Music |
| 1982 | "Wedding Well II" (ウエディング・ベル II) | "Abanchūru wa Rukkusu-shidai II" (アバンチュールはルックスしだい II) | Non-album single | For Life Music |
| 1983 | "Kisu ga Ippai" (キスがいっぱい) | "Haru Hana-zakari" (春・花ざかり) | Sugar Bean | For Life Music |
| 1983 | "Chū Bura Rabu" (中ブラ・ラブ) | "Chū Bura Rabu (Kareoke)" (中ブラ・ラブ (カラオケ)) | Non-album single | For Life Music |
| 1983 | "Tamago" (タマゴ) | "Imagination Express <Yume Kyūkō>" (IMAGINATION EXPRESS＜夢急行＞) | Non-album single | For Life Music |
| 1983 | "Circus Game" | "Suimasen My Love" (スイマセン My love) | Non-album single | For Life Music |
| 1985 | "Koi wa Masukarēdo" (恋はマスカレード) | "Midnight Call" | Non-album single | For Life Music |
| 1985 | "Naito Porisu" (ナイト・ポリス) | "Goin' Man" | 29:00 AM | For Life Music |
