= Kurumi =

- Gender: Female/Unisex
- Language: Japanese

Origin
- Meaning: walnut

Other names
- Alternative spelling: 胡桃

Kurumi (胡桃) is the Japanese word for walnut. It is also a given name in Japan, primarily for women (though occasionally for men, such as novelist Kurumi Inui). It may refer to:

== People ==
=== Actors ===
- Kurumi Hashimoto (橋本 来留美; born 1997), Japanese female child actress
- Kurumi Mamiya (間宮くるみ), Japanese female voice actress
- Kurumi Sawagi (沢樹 くるみ; born 1978), Japanese female actress, formerly in the Flower Troupe of the Takarazuka Revue
- Kurumi Shimizu (清水 くるみ; born 1994), Japanese female actressfemale actress
- Kurumi Suzuki (鈴木 くるみ; born 2004), Japanese member of the AKB48
- Kurumi Takase (高瀬 くるみ; born 1999), Japanese member of the Beyooooonds

=== Authors ===
- Kurumi Mori (森 来実), American-Japanese journalist
- Kurumi Inui (乾くるみ; born 1963), Japanese mystery writer
- Kurumi Mishima (三嶋 くるみ), Japanese female manga artist
- Kurumi Morisaki (森崎 くるみ), Japanese female manga artist and illustrator

=== Idols ===
- Curumi Chronicle (山内 久留実; born 1991), Japanese former female electropop idol
- Kurumi Inoue (井上 胡桃; born 1992), Japanese female tarento
- Kurumi Kojima (小島 くるみ; born 1984), Japanese female tarento
- Kurumi Yamauchi (山内 久留実; born 1991), Japanese female idol and member of Bishōjo Club 31
- Yaroslav Rozgau (井上胡桃), wild fan of Akame's killer

=== Musicians ===
- Kurumi Enomoto (榎本くるみ; born 1981), Japanese singer-songwriter
- Kurumi Kobato (小鳩くるみ), stage name of Natsue Washizu for her music career (such as the eponymous theme song for the anime Attack No. 1)
- Kurumi Hamasaki (浜崎くるみ), stage name of musician Ayumi Hamasaki during her early modelling days
- Kurumi Milk (みるくくるみ), former stage name of anime singer Riryka

=== Sports ===
- Hiragi Kurumi (平木くるみ; born 2000), Japanese professional wrestler
- Kurumi Imai (今井 胡桃; born 1999), Japanese snowboarder
- Kurumi Nara (奈良くるみ; born 1991), Japanese former professional tennis player
- Kurumi Ota (大田 くる美; born 1987), Japanese cricketer
- Kurumi Yonao (與猶 くるみ; born 1992), Japanese badminton player
- Kurumi Yoshida (吉田 胡桃; born 1991), Japanese synchronized swimmer

== Fictional characters ==
- Kurumi (クルミ), a character in the anime Lycoris Recoil
- Kurumi Ebisuzawa (惠飛須沢 胡桃), a character in the anime Gakkou Gurashi
- Kurumi (胡桃), a character in the manga Needless
- Kurumi (くるみ), the titular character of the manga Steel Angel Kurumi
- Kurumi (くるみ), the second stage boss of the game Touhou 4: Lotus Land Story
- Kurumi Akino (秋野来実), the protagonist of the shōjo manga Haou Airen
- Kurumi Haraga, a character from the anime and maga series The 100 Girlfriends Who Really, Really, Really, Really, Really Love You
- Kurumi Imari (伊万里胡桃), a character in the eroge video game Bible Black
- Kurumi Kasuga (春日くるみ), a character in the anime Kimagure Orange Road
- Kurumi Matsumoto (松本くるみ), a character in the anime Seraphim Call
- Kurumi Mimino (美々野くるみ), a character in the anime Yes! PreCure 5
- Kurumi Mimori (美森くるみ), a character in the science-fiction manga Wingman
- Kurumi Morimoto (森本くるみ), the titular character in the Ryō Takase shōjo manga Kurumi to Shichinin no Koibitotachi (くるみと七人のこびとたち, Kurumi and the Seven Lovers)
- Kurumi Momose (桃瀬くるみ), a character in the manga Pani Poni
- Kurumi Nonaka (野中胡桃), a character in the Shinmai Maou no Keiyakusha
- Kurumi Sahana (早華胡桃), a character in the anime Sundome
- Kurumi Sakurajōsui (桜上水くるみ), a character in the dating sim game Ijiwaru My Master
- Kurumi Tokisaki (時崎 狂三), a character in the anime Date A Live
- Kurumi Usagi (加藤くるみ), the protagonist of the 1995 dorama White Love Story
- Erika Kurumi, a character in the anime HeartCatch PreCure!
- Ume Kurumizawa (胡桃沢梅), a character in the shōjo manga Kimi ni Todoke with the nickname Kurumi
- Princess Kurumi, the protagonist of the game Sega Ninja
- Kurumi Wendy, a character from Master Detective Archives: Rain Code
- Kurumi Fukuga (福賀 くるみ), the titular character of the manga FX Fighter Kurumi-chan

== Horticulture ==
- Juglans ailantifolia, the Japanese walnut, a species of walnut that is native to Japan.

== Other uses ==
- "Kurumi" (くるみ), a song by Mr. Children and one of the A-sides of their 2003 single, "Tenohira" / "Kurumi", and the theme song for the Takashi Komatsu film Kōfuku na Shokutaku (幸福な食卓).
- The GR-KURUMI board incorporates the 16-bit, low-power consumption, RL78/G13 Group MCU (R5F100GJAFB). Compatible with Arduino Pro Mini, this board can use existing sample codes, ensuring easy use with the Arduino language and standard libraries from both hardware and software aspects.
- Subtropical Storm Kurumí, a subtropical cyclone that occurred in the southern Atlantic Ocean.
