= Kumiko (woodworking) =

Japanese woodworking technique

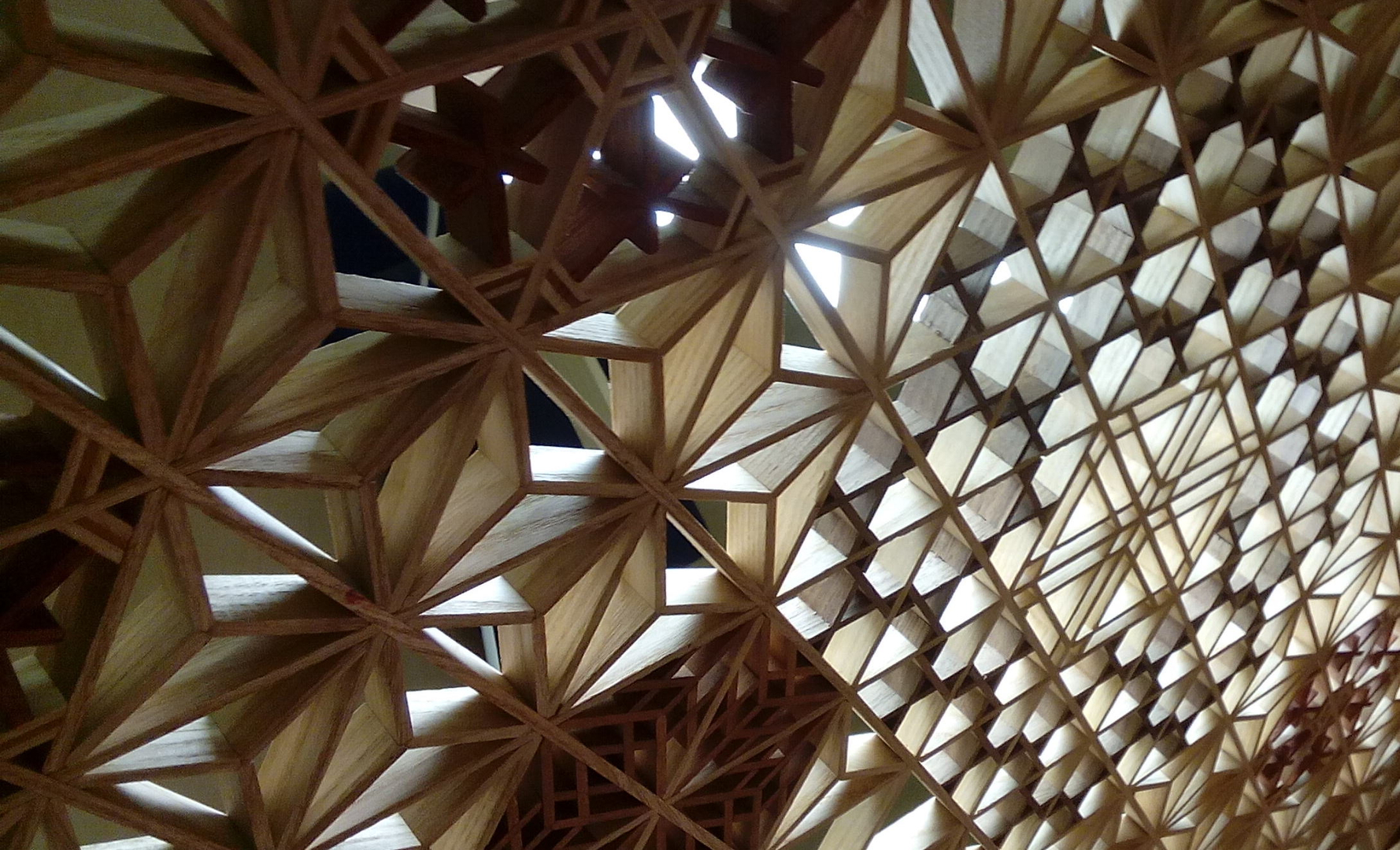
A complex kumiko panel

Kumiko (Japanese: 組子) is a Japanese technique of assembling wooden pieces without the use of nails.

== Method ==
Thinly-slit wooden pieces are grooved, punched, and mortised, and then fitted individually using a plane, saw, chisel, and other tools to make fine-adjustments. The technique was developed in Japan in the Asuka Era (600–700 AD). Kumiko panels slot together and remain in place through pressure alone, and that pressure is achieved through meticulously calculating, cutting, and arranging interweaving joints. The end-result is a complex pattern that is used primarily in the creation of shoji doors and screens. Traditionally, the wood of choice was the hinoki cypress.

=== Patterns ===
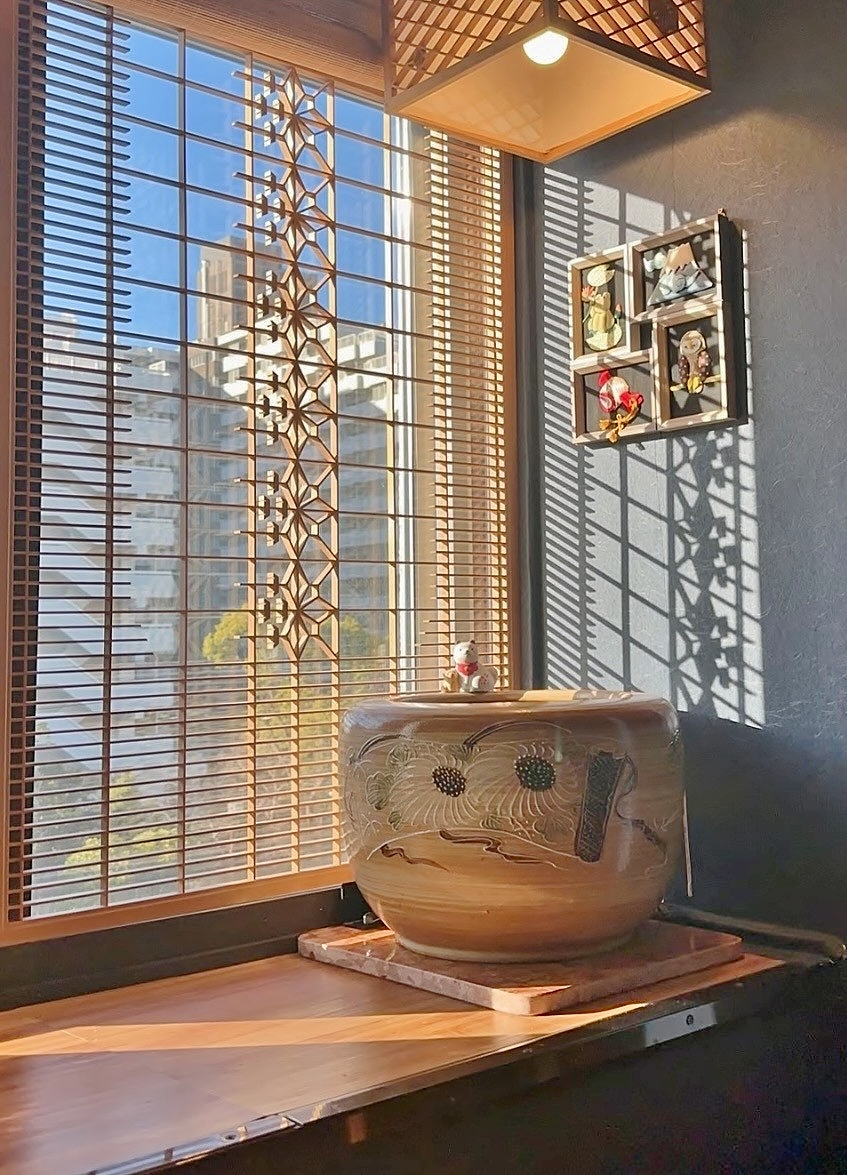
Kumiko wooden lattice casting light and shadow in a Japanese interior

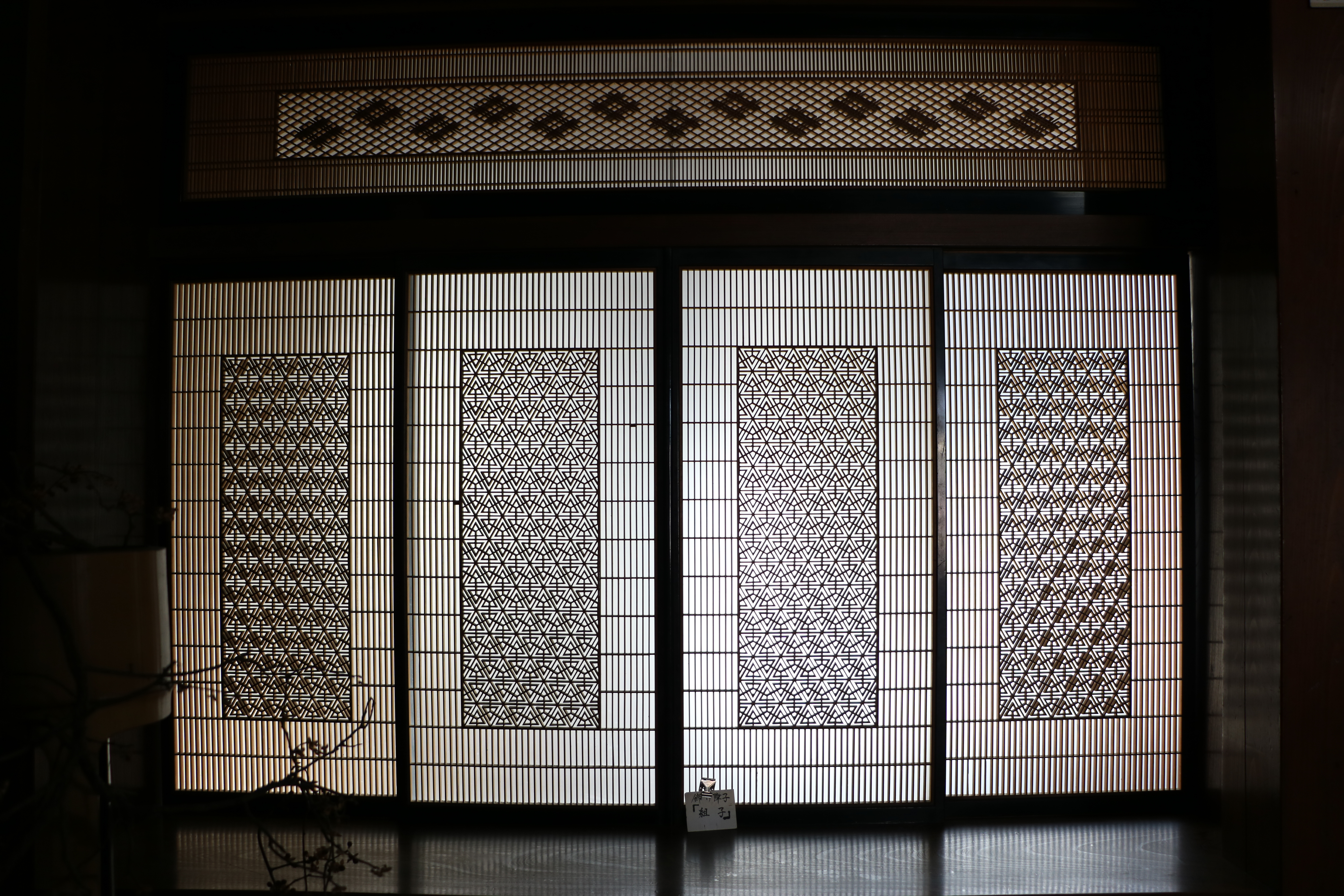
Kumiko panels from c. 1921

The designs for kumiko-pieces are not chosen randomly. Many of the nearly 200 patterns used today have been around since the Edo era (1603–1868). Each design has a meaning or mimicks a pattern in nature that is thought to be a good omen. The patterns are designed to look good, but also to distribute light and wind in a calming and beautiful way.

Traditionally, kumiko panels are made with hand tools only, though modern techniques exist, such as with a table saw, a sharp chisel, and some handmade guides. Some designs can be made with plywood, while others need to be made with hard or soft wood.

== See also ==
- Shoji § Frame
