= List of Macross episodes =

List of Macross episodes may refer to any of the following lists of Macross episodes:

- List of The Super Dimension Fortress Macross episodes
- List of Macross Plus episodes
- List of Macross 7 episodes
- List of Macross Frontier episodes
- List of Macross Zero episodes
- List of Macross Delta episodes
