= List of Macross Delta episodes =

This is a list of episodes for the Macross Delta anime series (2016).

The series used twelve musical themes: two openings and ten endings. Episodes 2–12 and 14 used the opening theme "Ichido Dake no Koi Nara" (一度だけの恋なら, lit. If I Love Only Once) by Walküre while the ending themes are "Ikenai Borderline" (いけないボーダーライン, lit. Forbidden Borderline), "Rune ga Pikatto Hikarittara" (ルンがピカッと光ったら, lit. When the Rune Sparkles), "Axia ~ Daisuki de Daikirai ~" (AXIA〜ダイスキでダイキライ〜, lit. 'Axia ~ I Love, I Hate'), "Giraffe Blues", and "Hametsu no Junjō" (破滅の純情, lit. Ruin of Pure Heart) by Walküre. From episodes 15–25, the opening theme is "Zettai Reido Θ Novatick" (絶対零度θノヴァティック, lit. Absolute Zero Theta Novatick) by Walküre while the ending themes are "Hametsu no Junjō" (破滅の純情, lit. Ruin of Pure Heart), "God Bless You", "Love! Thunder Grow", "Kaze wa Yokoku Naku Fuku" (風は予告なく吹く, lit. The Wind Blows Without Notice) by Walküre, and "Zettai Reido Θ Novatick" (絶対零度θノヴァティック, lit. Do You Remember Love? ~Orch2067~) by Mina Kubota. For episode 26, the ending theme is "Zettai Reido θ Novatick" (絶対零度θノヴァティック, lit. Absolute Zero Theta Novatick) by Walküre.

== Episodes ==
Episodes are named as "Missions". A typical episode title consists of a Japanese word written in kanji or hiragana, followed by an English word romanized in katakana.

No.	Title	Original release date
1	"Battlefield Prologue"; Transliteration: "Senjō no Purorōgu" (Japanese: 戦場のプロローグ)	April 3, 2016
In Shahal City on the planet Al Shahal, Hayate Immelman discovers a stowaway named Freyja Wion in the shipping docks. Freyja ran away from an arranged marriage and to audition for the idol group Walküre on the planet Ragna, but Hayate informs her that she is on the wrong planet. When a Vár outbreak suddenly causes Zentradi soldiers to go rogue and attack the city, Walküre and Delta Flight scramble to contain the threat, but are later on met by the Aerial Knights in a fierce dogfight. During the battle, Freyja sings along with Walküre and assists with suppressing the Vár while Hayate commandeers an abandoned Valkyrie and uses it to protect Freyja. Note: An advanced preview of this episode aired as Mission 0.89 on December 31, 2015.
2	"Resolute Audition"; Transliteration: "Kakugo no Ōdishon" (Japanese: 覚悟のオーディション)	April 10, 2016
Having arrived on planet Ragna with Hayate, Freyja receives special permission to enter the final auditions for Walküre. Meanwhile, Hayate is recruited by Delta Flight due to his skills in the previous battle; he is hesitant since he doesn't like fighting or following orders, but agrees so that he can have the chance to fly again. Freyja is told that she failed her audition, and on a train one of the passengers appears to contract the Vár infection. Freyja uses her song to calm the infected passenger, which is revealed to be a ruse to test her singing under pressure. Having passed, Freyja becomes an official member of Walküre.
3	"Whirlwind Dogfight"; Transliteration: "Senpū Doggufaito" (Japanese: 旋風 ドッグファイト)	April 17, 2016
Hayate is to be trained for Delta Flight by Mirage, but skips his lessons. She challenges him to a mock battle, where he must score a hit on her before the time limit or be expelled from the unit. Meanwhile, Freyja is unable to find the proper motivation to sing. In order to encourage her, the Walküre members have Freyja watch Hayate struggling against Mirage's superior piloting. Freyja begins to sing with purpose, which seemingly also gives Hayate the motivation he needs to score a hit on Mirage. Mirage is shocked, but Hayate promises to attend her training sessions.
4	"A Shocking Debut Stage"; Transliteration: "Shōgeki Debyū Sutēji" (Japanese: 衝撃 デビューステージ)	April 24, 2016
Freyja is to debut as a member of Walküre at a concert on planet Randall. Everything goes well until the Aerial Knights strike during a mass Vár outbreak among the New UN Spacy (NUNS) forces. Mikumo and Freyja begin singing in unison to stop the outbreak, and the other Walküre observe how Freyja's song seems to amplify Mikumo's, managing to suppress the Vár outbreak on their own. Meanwhile, the Aerial Knights reveal their identity, that their army has seized planet Voldor, and the Kingdom of Windermere declares war against the New Unified Government.
5	"Moonlight Dancing"; Transliteration: "Gekkō Danshingu" (Japanese: 月光 ダンシング)	May 1, 2016
Following the Windermere Kingdom's declaration of war on the New United Government, Delta Flight and Walküre are given new orders to defend Ragna from upcoming attacks. When rumors of Freyja being a Windermerean spy surface, she and Hayate take a joyride in his Siegfried unit to clear their heads.
6	"Decision Overload"; Transliteration: "Ketsudan Ōbārōdo" (Japanese: 決断 オーバーロード)	May 8, 2016
The Aether is sortied to counter another Vár Syndrome infection on a NUNS squadron. Hayate and Mirage initially try to disable the infected pilots rather than killing them. But when Walküre are endangered and Mirage becomes outnumbered and disabled, Hayate has to cross a line to defend them.
7	"Behind Enemy Lines"; Transliteration: "Sen'nyū Enemī Rain" (Japanese: 潜入 エネミーライン)	May 15, 2016
Walküre and the Delta Flight perform a covert mission to planet Voldor to learn more about the enemy's plans. They explore ancient ruins built by the Protoculture civilization, where they discover the truth behind the proliferation of Vár Syndrome outbreaks.
8	"Escape Resonance"; Transliteration: "Dasshutsu Rezonansu" (Japanese: 脱出 レゾナンス)	May 22, 2016
Hayate, Freyja, and Mirage are trapped by the Aerial Knights while Messer and the rest of Walküre make a last-ditch effort to rescue them. During their escape, Walküre and the Delta Flight confront the Knights once more, and Hayate and Freyja face an infected NUNS ace pilot for the sake of returning him to his children.
9	"Uncontrolled on the Edge"; Transliteration: "Genkai Ankontorōru" (Japanese: 限界 アンコントロール)	May 29, 2016
On Ragna, Hayate is revealed to have fold receptors in his body, which resonate with Freyja and make him immune to the Vár Syndrome. Hayate and Mirage confront Messer over his Vár Syndrome infection, before accidentally discovering a song recorded by Kaname. As the duo attempt to help Messer, their closeness brings a lingering feeling of anxiety to Freyja. The Aerial Knights engage Delta Flight as a diversion to scan submerged Protoculture ruins on Ragna.
10	"Axia Flash"; Transliteration: "Senkō no Akushia" (Japanese: 閃光のAXIA)	June 5, 2016
Due to his infection, Messer is reassigned, but not before he expresses his gratitude to Kaname at the Jellyfish Festival. Realizing that the Windermereans have only attacked planets with ruins, Walküre and Delta Flight go to the last such planet, Al Shahal, and singers from both sides try to gain control of the ruins. Delta Flight are losing a battle against the Aerial Knights when Messer returns to save Kaname and fight Keith.
11	"Jellyfish Reminiscence"; Transliteration: "Tsuioku Jerīfisshu" (Japanese: 追憶 ジェリーフィッシュ)	June 12, 2016
Walküre and Delta Flight pay their respects to the fallen Messer, while Mikumo, Freyja and Heinz cope with the visions they received in the battle. Arad and Kaname determine that if Windemere gains control of the ruins on Ragna and Al Shahal, all eight billion inhabitants of the Brísingr Cluster will be vulnerable to Vár Syndrome. Aged Grammier VI assumes command of Windemere's military and launches an ancient ship of the Protoculture civilization for a full-scale assault.
12	"King of the Wind"; Transliteration: "Kingu obu za Uindo" (Japanese: キング・オブ・ザ・ウインド)	June 19, 2016
Al Shahal quickly falls to Windermere, and remaining forces gather on Ragna. Mirage is given command of Delta Flight. NUNS command prepares to destroy Ragna's Protoculture ruins to prevent them from falling into enemy hands, though this could devastate the planet. This action is delayed while Chaos launches the Macross Elysion to commence Operation Einherjar (オペレーション・エインヘリャル, Operēshon Einheryaru) and confront the Windermere forces before Heinz has time to recover.
13	"Passionate Diving"; Transliteration: "Jōnetsu Daibingu" (Japanese: 情熱 ダイビング)	June 26, 2016
The Macross Elysion defolds at Al Shahal just as the Sigur Berrentz is commencing a fold to Ragna, and fires a single salvo which damages the Windermere sound wave system. The Berrentz arrives before the NUNS defence fleet at Ragna, and a dimensional bomb is detonated as it takes position over the ruins. A structure rises in place of the ruins and begins to merge with the ship, amplifying Heinz's song and rapidly spreading the Vár Syndrome. Elysion arrives and protects the island spaceship which is evacuating Ragna's civilians. Freyja risks her life so her song will reach Hayate, allowing him to defeat the White Knight and also overpowering Heinz so that the Elysion can fire its main gun at the Berrentz. The Chaos and NUNS forces retreat, while Grammier dies and Roid takes command.
14	"Embracing Adrift"; Transliteration: "Hyōryū Enbureishingu" (Japanese: 漂流 エンブレイシング)	July 3, 2016
With the entire Brísingr Cluster under Windermerean control, the Macross Elysion struggles to support Ragna's refugees on the damaged and undersupplied Island spaceship. While Hayate and Mirage work to restore power under a gravity failure, Walküre sing to calm the civilians.
15	"Parting Resolution"; Transliteration: "Ketsubetsu Rezoryūshon" (Japanese: 決別 レゾリューション)	July 10, 2016
The Windermere attack force return to their home planet for Heinz's coronation. Declaring themselves the Starwind Sector, they broadcast evidence of the NUNS using dimensional weapons. Influenced by the will of the previous king, Roid announces that as the rightful heirs to Protoculture, they will expand throughout the galaxy to destroy oppressive Earthlings and their allies, establishing a galactic empire. Heinz's singing causes all of the Protoculture ruins in the Brísingr Cluster to transform, amplifying the Vár Syndrome. A NUNS fleet is destroyed on approach.
16	"Hesitating Birthday"; Transliteration: "Tamerai Bāsudei" (Japanese: ためらい バースデイ)	July 17, 2016
Aboard the Island, Makina and Chuck plan a surprise party for Freyja's 15th birthday. Hayate and Mirage go shopping for a present while Makina, Reina, and Chuck spy on them. On the night of the party, Freyja gives a speech about her childhood on Windermere and what she did to become a member of Walküre before Hayate arrives with his gift to her.
17	"Scatter on Stage"; Transliteration: "Kakusan Onsutēji" (Japanese: 拡散 オンステージ)	July 24, 2016
Walküre broadcasts a special live concert to distribute a virus in the Galaxy Network while also raising funds through online purchases to resupply Chaos. Freyja begins to show her feelings for Hayate, while others are concerned of Mikumo's performance change. Hayate learns that his father, Wright Immelmann, dropped a dimensional weapon on Windemere 7 years ago.
18	"Sense Emergence"; Transliteration: "Kankaku Emājensu" (Japanese: 感覚 エマージェンス)	July 31, 2016
Delta Flight and Walküre arrive on planet Voldor to investigate the Protoculture ruins, but the Aerial Knights arrive for their own experiment. Freyja and Hayate are captured by Kassim, who questions Windermere's ambitions for galactic conquest and releases them. Mikumo begins to regain her memories and starts singing, activating the ruins and triggering a battle between Delta Flight and the Aerial Knights. A singing battle causes the ruins to overload across the Brísingr Cluster, with Mikumo overpowering Heinz and causing the Voldor ruins to explode.
19	"Eternal Songs"; Transliteration: "Etānaru Songusu"	August 7, 2016
Hayate, Mikumo and Heinz are all unconscious after the destruction of the ruins, which liberated Voldor from the Vár Syndrome and Windermere control. Arms dealer Berger Stone makes a delivery to Chaos and, despite also working with Windermere, discusses his theories. He mentions the events occurred of The Super Dimension Fortress Macross, Macross Plus, Macross 7, and Macross Frontier, suggesting that the Protoculture designed humans to use music as a weapon, and that Mikumo is an artificial being created by the enigmatic Lady M to harness this power. Mirage expresses her feelings to Hayate, who awakens.
20	"Impulse Experiment"; Transliteration: "Shōdō Ekusuperimento" (Japanese: 衝動 エクスペリメント)	August 14, 2016
An experiment aims to measure the effects of Freyja's singing on Hayate's body, but she is unable to sing due to concern for his wellbeing. They each offer to resign for the other's sake, but Mirage lectures them both to not give up their dreams. Kaname, Makina and Reina infiltrate a high-security medical ship to learn what happened to Mikumo; the others are caught and detained while Kaname finds her. On Windermere, Keith doubts Roid's intentions and asks twins Theo and Xao Jussila for a favor.
21	"Yearning Secret"; Transliteration: "Setsubō Shīkuretto" (Japanese: 切望 シークレット)	August 21, 2016
The Kingdom of Windermere transmits delta waves through Heinz's song to Al Shahal, putting 85% of the planet's population into a comatose state. While in prison, Kaname, Makina, and Reina reminisce on Walküre's formation and first meeting Mikumo. Mikumo recovers, and reveals that she was implanted with fold receptors when she was created, three years ago. Meanwhile, Keith discovers that Heinz is suffering from premature aging and Roid reveals that he murdered King Grammier VI.
22	"Extreme Bravery"; Transliteration: "Kyokugen Bureibu" (Japanese: 極限 ブレイブ)	August 28, 2016
Since Mikumo can destroy the ruins without harming their planets, Chaos decides to bring an end to the war while they believe Heinz is too weak to sing. The Macross Elysion makes a diversionary attack while Walküre and Delta Flight seek to destroy the song amplifier that controls the ruins. Although the Aerial Knights engage them, Hayate, Mirage, Arad, and the members of Walküre slip past the dimensional barrier to Windermere. Kassim follows and burns the last of his energies in a desperate effort to stop them.
23	"Scarred Requiem"; Transliteration: "Zankon Rekuiemu" (Japanese: 残痕 レクイエム)	September 4, 2016
Following the crash of their shuttle, Mikumo, Makina, and Reina hide in the forest to evade detection by Windermerean forces. Freyja leads Hayate and Mirage to her village while Arad and Kaname enter an abandoned NUNS garrison. Mikumo is captured by Roid, who calls her the Star Singer. Hayate, Freyja, and Mirage are cornered by the Aerial Knights, who confront Hayate over Wright's apparent crimes and Freyja over her betrayal. They are brought to the site of the dimensional explosion and then to Wright's plane, restored in the castle as a constant reminder.
24	"Fatal Judgment"; Transliteration: "Zetsumei Jajjimento" (Japanese: 絶命 ジャッジメント)	September 11, 2016
Hayate, Freyja, and Mirage are sentenced to execution at a summary trial before King Heinz. He was moved by the warmth of her singing, but Freyja found an emptiness in his. Roid brings Mikumo to the sealed Sanctum; he sees her as the reincarnation of the Star Singer, created with something which had been stolen from the Sanctum seven years ago. Berger brings Arad, Kaname, Makina, and Reina to Wright's plane, which they use to interrupt the execution outside. They resume their mission to destroy the Protoculture ruins. Makina is shot by a sniper while protecting Freyja, and Walküre's continued singing opens a fold point for Chaos reinforcements. However, Roid awakens Mikumo's power, which further expands the Protoculture structure and forces Chaos to withdraw. Freyja shows signs of aging.
25	"Star Singer"; Transliteration: "Hoshi no Utaite" (Japanese: 星の歌い手)	September 18, 2016
Wright's flight recorder reveals that he deviated from his mission to destroy the Protoculture ruins at the Windermere capital city, dropping the bomb elsewhere to minimize casualties. Berger indicates that Wright also retrieved the genetic sample which allowed Mikumo to be created, and that her Song of the Stars links people via delta waves. Roid says that the new Star Temple on Ragna will amplify Mikumo's song across the galaxy. A NUNS fleet approaches the Brísingr Cluster with dimensional weapons, putting pressure on both Chaos and Windermere to secure Ragna. Freyja hides her aging, and realizes that Wright introduced her to Earth music. Heinz commands Mikumo to sing, causing the NUNS fleet to detonate their weapons, annihilating themselves.
26	"Eternal Walküre"; Transliteration: "Eien no Warukyūre" (Japanese: 永遠のワルキューレ)	September 25, 2016
Being directly responsible for taking the lives of the NUNS fleet, Heinz considers negotiating for peace. Heinz orders Mikumo to sing the Song of the Stars, sending delta waves throughout the Brísingr Cluster, and revealing Roid's true objective to unite the galaxy's humanoids in a hive mind, allowing the Windermereans to exceed their short lifespans. Heinz and Freyja resist the spell through their fold receptors, and the feelings between Hayate, Freyja and Mirage enable Chaos and the Aerial Knights to break free. The combined power of Walküre releases Mikumo from Roid's control and both factions break through the Star Temple. As Mikumo is rescued, Keith ends the conflict by fatally injuring Roid while both are consumed in the destruction of the Star Temple. In the aftermath of the battle, Heinz orders the remaining Windermerean forces to retreat as the Starwind Sector falls.

== Films ==
No.	Title	Original release date
1	"Macross Delta: Passionate Walküre"; Transliteration: "Gekijō-ban Makurosu Deruta Gekijō no Warukyūre" (Japanese: 劇場版マクロス のワルキューレ)	February 9, 2018
A compilation of the events of the anime series.
2	"Macross Delta: Zettai Live!!!!!!"; Transliteration: "Gekijōban Makurosu Deruta Zettai LIVE!!!!!!" (Japanese: 劇場版マクロスΔ 絶対LIVE!!!!!!)	October 8, 2021
In the aftermath of the conflict between NUNS and Windermere, Heinz decides to negotiate a peace treaty. To celebrate the occasion, Walküre and the Aerial Knights team up to conduct a performance at Windermere. After the concert, they visit Freyja's village and celebrate at night. Underneath the apple tree, Hayate takes the opportunity to confess his feelings for Freyja. However, the Macross Astrea from the Heimdall group suddenly warps in over the village and begins attacking the Windermerean forces. With their own songstress, Siren, Heimdall quickly overwhelms the defenders. Delta Flight and Walküre are barely able to escape thanks to the timely arrival of Macross Gigasion, captained by Mirage's grandfather Maximilian Jenius. It's revealed that Heimdall is led by a rogue NUNS officer named Ian Cromwell, who declares war on the UN and Lady M who he feels is holding humanity back by suppressing AI, cloning, and Protoculture research. Delta Flight realizes that Siren is actually an biomechanical AI similar to Sharon Apple and withdraws to regroup and figure out a counter to it. However, Heimdall tracks them down and attacks until Freyja uses her singing to disrupt them, giving the NUNS forces time to escape but using up much of her life force. Freyja is forced off the mission while Maximilian leads a NUNS attack against Heimdall on Windermere. However, when the battle starts, Cromwell uses Siren to open a Super Fold Gate to expose the long lost Megaroad-01, intent on destroying Lady M. Despite being close to death, Freyja decides to continues singing, powering up Hayate and Delta Flight as well as shutting down Siren. Hayate breaches Macross Astrea's defenses, allowing the NUNS fleet to destroy Macross Astrea and kill Cromwell. Hayate is able to escape with Siren's core and thanks to Freyja's singing, Siren's core is able to mature into a baby girl resembling Freyja. However, Freyja herself is left near death from the strain of her singing. Hayate and Freyja spend their last moments together as she dies in his arms. Afterwards, Hayate decides to raise the child created from Siren as his own.
