= Super Dimension Cavalry Southern Cross =

Japanese anime television series

- Promotional art showing Jeanne Fránçaix's ATAC-01-SCA Spartas mecha (left) and Seifriet Weiße's red Zor Bioroid (right).
- 超時空騎団サザンクロス
- Genre: Adventure, mecha, military science fiction
- Developed by: Jinzō Toriumi
- Directed by: Yasuo Hasegawa (chief)
- Music by: Ken Satō; Yuji Dan
- Opening theme: "Hoshi no Déjà Vu" (Note: In Japanese: 星のデジャ・ブー (lit. "Déjà Vu of the Stars")) by Yoko Katori
- Ending theme: "Yakusoku" (Note: In Japanese: 約束 (lit. "Promise")) by Yoko Katori
- Country of origin: Japan
- Original language: Japanese
- No. of episodes: 23

Production
- Executive producer: Kenji Yoshida
- Producers: Masanori Nakano; Akira Inoue
- Production companies: Tatsunoko Production; Mainichi Broadcasting System

Original release
- Network: JNN (MBS, TBS)
- Release: April 15 – September 30, 1984

Related
- Super Dimension; Robotech

Super Dimension Cavalry Southern Cross (Japanese: 超時空騎団サザンクロス, Hepburn: Chōjikū Kidan Sazan Kurosu) is a Japanese science fiction mecha anime TV series released in 1984, as the third of the Super Dimension series. It was adapted as "The Masters Saga" or the "Second Generation" of the American TV series Robotech.

== Plot ==
In the year 2120, humanity has left the Solar System and started the colonization of other planets. One of the farthest colonies is located on the terraformed planet Glorie. The powerful army of the Southern Cross protects the colonists there from any unknown dangers. However, unbeknownst to the humans, Glorie is also the ancestral home of the Zor, a highly advanced race of nomadic humanoid aliens who have returned to reclaim their world.

=== Characters ===
==== Main characters ====
Jeanne Françaix (ジャンヌ・フランセーズ, Jannu Furansēzu) (Michie Tomizawa): At 17 years of age, Jeanne finds herself the leader of the 15th Squad in the Southern Cross' Alpha Tactics Armored Corps (ATAC). A native from the planet Liberté, Jeanne has a tendency to follow her heart and act rashly. Her superiors consider her to be an embarrassment to the army because they feel that she does not take her duty seriously. Her frequent disregard for protocol, orders, and regulations continually lands her in solitary confinement, often placed there by Lt. Lana Isavia. Fortunately she always manages to be let out when needed. Jeanne develops a romantic interest in Seifriet Weiße, but his reaction is one of puzzlement and disdain. Most of the series revolves around Jeanne's escapades with the 15th Squad, and her increasingly personal war with the invading Zor.

In Robotech, her name was changed to Dana Sterling.

Marie Angel (マリー・アンジェル, Marī Anjeru) (Kumiko Mizukura): Nicknamed the "Cosmo Amazon", Marie represents the model soldier. She was once the leader of a biker gang and has also an aptitude for machines. Despite her tough exterior, she still feels intensely, and begins a rocky relationship with the womanizer Charles Des Étoiles. As a capable leader, Marie is often the one to snap Jeanne out of her periodic episodes of shock or indecision, usually with a slap to the face. Marie leads her own unit within the Tactics Armored Space Corps (TASC), in which she is also an ace pilot.

Lana Isavia (ラーナ・イザビア, Rāna Izabia) (Mika Doi): The third central woman of the Southern Cross. At 19, Lana is the youngest military police officer on Glorie, and one of the highest-ranking. Like Marie, she is quite different from Jeanne, taking her duties very seriously and allowing no compromises regarding protocol and regulations. Her rivalry with Jeanne can be viewed as a subtle game of "cat and mouse". In the beginning of the series, Lana appears to be colder and less personable than Marie. But as the story progresses, it is revealed that she is an even bigger romantic than Jeanne. Her military training eventually conflicts with her passionate emotions, and she is forced to choose between her duty to the Southern Cross and her friendship with the 15th Squad.

==== Other characters ====
Bowie Emerson (ボウイ・エマーソン, Bōi Emāson) (Arihiro Hase): Bowie is a private first class assigned to the 15th Squad at the age of 16. Due to his father's influence, he was pressured to join the military even though he is a pacifist more interested in composing music rather than fighting.

In Robotech, his name was changed to Bowie Grant.

Andrzej Sławski (アンジェイ・スラウスキー, Anjei Surausukī) (Yūichi Meguro): He is the dutiful sergeant of the 15th Squad, occasionally acting as leader in the absence of a superior officer. He has served longer than anyone else in the 15th Squad, but his conventional mindset is sometimes at odds with his new commanding officer, Jeanne Fránçaix. In Robotech, his name was changed to Angelo Dante.

Louis Ducasse (ルーイ・デュカス, Rūi Dyukasu) (Issei Futamata): He is the resident mechanics expert and in-house genius. A quiet individual until a mecha-related issue comes up. His expertise comes in use when assessing and analyzing the Bioroid threat. In Robotech, his name was changed to Louis "Louie" Nichols.

Charles Des Étoiles (シャルル・ドゥ・エトワード, Sharuru Du Etowādo) (from the most famous French Parisians subway station on the top of Champs Elysées (Charles de Gaulle l'Étoile)) (Bin Shimada): At the age of 23, Charles was the former commander of the 15th Squad until a romantic indiscretion had him demoted to private. Charles is a constant womanizer who eventually falls in love with Marie. In Robotech, his named was changed to Sean Phillips.

Seifriet Weiße (サイフリート・ヴァイス, Saifurīto Vaisu) (Yoshikazu Hirano): He is a human pilot who was captured and brainwashed by the Zor, and later becomes an informant for them. Initially, Seifreit pilots a red Zor Bioroid, and he is nearly unstoppable in battle against Jeanne and her ATAC squadron. He is recaptured by Lana, and his memories are examined for clues into the Zor. His human mind begins to conflict with his Zor brainwashing, and he is nearly driven insane. Instead of breaking down mentally, he decides to take revenge on the Zor for their violation of his mind. In Robotech, his name is changed to Zor Prime (a clone of the original Zor, Protoculture Scientist from the Macross saga).

Lt. Dennis Brown (デニス・ブラウン, Denisu Buraun) (Kouji Totani): He is a lieutenant in the Tactics Armored Space Corps (TASC). Lana is impressed with Brown's sense of integrity, optimism, and duty. His name is unchanged for Robotech.

Claude Leon (クロード・レオン, Kurōdo Reon) (Daisuke Gōri): The supreme general of the Southern Cross. A megalomaniac determined on wiping out the Zor at any cost, he begins to take extreme measures to ensure victory. His policies are heavily criticized by General Emerson. In Robotech, he is called "Supreme Commander Leonard".

Rolf Emerson (ロルフ・エマーソン, Rorufu Emāson) (Makoto Terada): Father of Bowie Emerson, and part-time guardian of Jeanne. He is the primary critic of General Leon, but stops short of disobeying orders. His tactical maneuvers during battles in the war with the Zor are seen as innovative and ingenious. His name is unchanged for Robotech.

Dess (デス, Desu), Dera (デラ, Dera) and Demi (デミ, Demi) (Hirotaka Suzuoki): the leaders of the Zor. In Robotech, they are not individually named but referred to as "The Robotech Masters" or "The Triumvirate".

Musica (ムジカ, Mujika), Musiere (ムジエ, Mujie), Muselle (ムゼル, Muzeru) (Noriko Hidaka): The triplet sirens whose music inspires the Zor people. Musica begins doubting her people's ways and, after meeting Bowie, escapes the mother ship and defects to Glorie. She and Bowie quickly fall in love, and then flee into the woods to escape capture by Lana. In Robotech, they are called Musica (no change), Allegra, and Octavia.

=== Background ===
The world of Glorie was founded by the human race in an effort to find new worlds for humanity because the Earth had become uninhabitable as a result of a catastrophic nuclear holocaust. Relay stations have been established at Mars and Jupiter, and as a result the planet "Liberté" located in the Proxima solar system was colonized. The next planet, Glorie, was discovered in the Epsilon Eridani system. Similar in planetary scale and atmospheric conditions to Earth, Glorie still had an unexpectedly harsh natural environment. The planet has an elliptical orbit around the sun, with a cycle of 73 years. Sixty percent of the planet's surface area is land, and in the winter, fifty percent of that land is covered with glaciers. Originally the planetary temperatures in winter averaged between −5 and −30 °C (23 and −22 °F). Thanks to extensive military terraforming, Glorie was successfully turned into a suitable planet for terrestrial life.

The government of Glorie is independent from that of Liberté but is an ally to that planet. In the year 2120 (when this story takes place), Glorie is now a self-sufficient planet in terms of food and resources.

=== Southern Cross Army ===
The military organization (referred to as the Southern Cross Army) is under the jurisdiction of its prime minister. The units are divided among the Surface (land/sea) Forces and the Aerospace Forces.

The Surface Forces consist of:

- A.T.A.C. - the Alpha Tactics Armored Corps,
- C.D.U. - the Cities Defense Unit, and
- T.C. - the Tactics Corps and its specialized subdivisions:
  - RE.P. - the Reconnoitering Party,
  - CO.S. - the Cold Squad,
  - DE.S. - the Desert Squad,
  - MO.S. - the Mountains Squad,
  - FO.S. - the Forest Squad,
  - MA.S. - the Marsh Squad, and
  - NA.D. - the Navy Division.

The Aerospace Forces consist of:

- T.A.F. - the Tactics Air Force,
- T.S.C. - the Tactics Space Corps,
- C.D.F.C. - the Cities Defense Flying Corps, and
- T.A.S.C. - the Tactics Armored Space Corps.

There are also security forces and the Glorie Military Police (G.M.P.), which are independent but still directly affiliated with Supreme General Headquarters. Headquarters are located in every major city.

Each unit has a specialized robotic vehicle for combat campaigns. Among them are:

- ATAC-01-SCA Spartas: A one-man transformable hit-and-run vehicle used exclusively by the Alpha Tactics Armored Corps (A.T.A.C.). Each Spartas has the ability to transform into 3 modes: Sniping Clapper (a high-speed hovercraft), Walker Cannon (a GERWALK-like artillery emplacement which actually cannot walk but can make rocket-assisted jumps), and Battle Sniper (a humanoid robot form). Models differ depending on the rank of the individual and are upgraded throughout the conflict. By the time that the Auroran is introduced, the Spartas has been remodeled for effective space combat.
- TASC-01-SCF Logan: The Logan is a transformable aerial assault mecha used exclusively by the Tactics Armored Space Corps (T.A.S.C.). The mecha has two modes: Flying Cat (fighter) mode for high-speed aerial combat and Flying Walker (humanoid) mode which is suited for near ground assaults. The fighter has the ability to cover great distances but performs poorly in space and is consistently outfought by Bioroids in all early engagements of the war.
- TASC-02-SCF Auroran: The Auroran was a late development during the war, that was constructed to replace the Logan. It has the capability to transform into three different modes: Crusader (fighter), Cross Fighter (heavy combat helicopter), and Cosmo Sniper (humanoid). Though the new Cosmo Sniper mode was specifically designed to deal with the Zor Bioroid threat, the Auroran proves only moderately successful, since its debut coincides closely with an improved model of bioroid.
- TAF Sylphide: The Sylphide is a fighter used by the Tactics Air Force. This fighter can also be distinguished by a center tail as well as vertical surfaces mounted in the middle of each wing. The weaponry of the Sylphide includes two guns in the fuselage, two guns mounted on a ventral pod and four missile hardpoints (two on the outside of either lower engine nacelle).
- GMP Garm: The Southern Cross Glorie Military Police uses this mecha fielded exclusively for it. The unit is capable of identifying personnel and recording evidence in investigations. Its systems have access to the military legal code to assist in determining if the law has been broken.
- TC Salamander: The Tactics Corps uses the Salamander robot as their main combat robot for high-mobility heavy-weapons support. The arms have reinforced armor to assist in parrying attacks. There is a thruster in the rear to assist the mecha in leaping.

=== Personal armor ===
Every soldier of the Southern Cross Army is issued a personal combat suit known as an "arming doublet". The suit not only acts as protective armor but also improves combat performance. Each suit is equipped to serve different functions and can be altered depending on the mission requirements and needs of each division and rank. All suits are personally tailored for the physique of the individual, resulting in high mobility. Some variants of the arming doublet also have the ability to serve as self-sealed spacesuits.

=== Zor ===
The Zor (ゾル, Zoru) are a race who serve as the antagonists for the Southern Cross Army. The Zor were the former inhabitants of the planet Glorie, but they had to evacuate due to an apocalyptic war. Their advances in biotechnology surpass that of humanity, and the weapons they employ called "Bioroids" serve as a formidable enemy to the units of the Southern Cross. They operate in groups of three. Each member is responsible for one of three functions: information, decision and action. As a whole, they present a powerful threat, but if one member is lost to the group, then they lose their stability and become unable to function. Characteristically, the Zor are human in appearance, tall and slender with violet eyes, silvery hair and pale skin.

The Zor have a symbiotic relationship with a flower native to Glorie referred to as the Protozor, which, like them, exist in trinities.

=== Bioroids ===
Like the troops of the Southern Cross, the Zor rely on large humanoid mecha to spearhead military operations. The Zor mecha, called "bioroids", are considerably more advanced than their Southern Cross counterparts, based on a symbiotic interface that conveys the thoughts of the operator directly to the mecha. Because of this interface, Bioroids are effectively "alive", with the pilots acting as their "brains"; this increases the response promptness and makes their movements much more agile that those of the Southern Cross mecha. At the same time, there appears to be no pain-receptor feedback to the pilot, as bioroids are unaffected by direct hits unless the cockpit itself is damaged.

In addition to mentally centered control, bioroids have access to an array of weapons, including both advanced projectile and sustained-beam weapons held in one hand. Typical engagements also find the bioroids riding anti-gravity hovercraft equipped with their own strafing weapons, and it appears that the hovercraft can be summoned to their riders remotely.

Since the Zor are not a race suited for combat, they abduct personnel from the armies of the Southern Cross and Liberté forces, brainwash them, and use them as "biohuman" pilots for the bioroids. Southern Cross troops adapt slowly to the tactical imbalance they have versus bioroid forces but become ensnared as they start to gain ground in combat by the psychological deterrent of knowing that they are fighting their own kind. Even late in the war, Southern Cross troops demonstrate conflicting emotions over advances in weaponry, knowing that increases in their own kill rates paradoxically still mean greater death for humanity as a whole.

During the time of the conflict, many variations of the Bioroid are implemented by the Zor in order to adapt to the ever-changing battle conditions experienced on the field. The final version of the Bioroid embodies the Zor's own triplet model of operation, with each triple set representing thought, action, and reaction.

== Episode list ==
Original Japanese Air Date	Southern Cross Episode	Robotech: The Masters Saga Episode
—	—	37. Dana's Story
April 15, 1984	1. Prisoner (プリズナー, Purizunā)	38. False Start
April 22, 1984	2. Makeup (メイクアップ, Meikuappu)	39. Southern Cross
April 29, 1984	3. Star Angel (スターエンゼル, Sutā Enzeru)	40. Volunteers
May 6, 1984	4. Half Moon (ハーフム－ン, Hāfu Mūn)	41. Half Moon
May 13, 1984	5. Trouble City (トラブルシティ, Toraburu Shitī)	42. Danger Zone
May 20, 1984	6. Prelude (プレリュード, Pureryūdo)	43. Prelude to Battle
May 27, 1984	7. Labyrinth (ラビリンス, Rabirinsu)	44. The Trap
June 10, 1984	8. Metal Fire (メタルファイア, Metaru Faia)	45. Metal Fire
June 17, 1984	9. Star Dust (スターダスト, Sutā Dasuto)	46. Star Dust
June 24, 1984	10. Outsider (アウトサイダー, Autosaidā)	47. Outsiders
July 1, 1984	11. Déjà Vu (デジャブー, Deja Bū)	48. Deja Vu
July 8, 1984	12. Lost Memory (ロストメモリー, Rosuto Memorī)	49. A New Recruit
July 15, 1984	13. Triple Mirror (トリプルミラー, Toripuru Mirā)	50. Triumvirate
July 22, 1984	14. Iron Lady (アイアンレディー, Aian Redī)	51. Clone Chamber
July 29, 1984	15. Love Story (ラブストーリー, Rabu Sutōrī)	52. Love Song
August 5, 1984	16. Hunter Killer (ハンターキラー, Hantā Kirā)	53. The Hunters
August 19, 1984	17. Bio Psycher (バイオサイカー, Baio Saikā)	54. Mind Games
August 26, 1984	18. Wonderland (ワンダーランド, Wandārando)	55. Dana in Wonderland
September 2, 1984	19. Crisis (クライシス, Kuraishisu)	56. Crisis Point
September 9, 1984	20. Daydream (デイドリーム, Deidorīmu)	57. Daydreamer
September 16, 1984	21. Nightmare (ナイトメア, Naitomea)	58. The Final Nightmare
September 23, 1984	22. Catastrophe (カタストロフ, Katasutorofu)	59. The Invid Connection
September 30, 1984	23. Genesis (ジェネシス, Jeneshisu)	60. Catastrophe

NOTE: "Dana's Story" was not a straight adaptation of a Japanese episode, but rather a clip show cobbled together from Macross and Southern Cross episodes which established Dana Sterling (Jeanne) as the daughter of the Macross characters Max and Miriya (Milia), a connection between Macross and Southern Cross that was a creation of Robotech producers Harmony Gold and was not present in the original Japanese. It served also to bring the total number of Robotech episodes to 85.

== Production ==
The show was the third mecha anime series released under the Super Dimension moniker by the sponsor Big West in 1984. This science fiction series followed two other series created by Studio Nue with Artland: Super Dimension Fortress Macross (1982–1983), sponsored by Big West and animated by Tatsunoko Production, and Super Dimension Century Orguss (1983–1984), sponsored by Big West and animated by Tokyo Movie Shinsha.

Unlike the previous two series, Southern Cross was created and produced almost entirely by Tatsunoko Production, with mechanical designs by its sister studio Ammonite. The series lasted for 23 episodes. The three titles share some of the same creators, and Macross is referenced by character cameos and inside references by the latter two series. However, the basic stories are unrelated.

=== Home video ===
The series was released on DVD in North America by ADV Films under license from Harmony Gold USA, who owns all international rights to Southern Cross.

=== Staff ===
- Producer: Masanori Nakano
- Executive Producer: Kenji Yoshida
- Chief Director: Yasuo Hasegawa
- Script: Masanori Hama
- Original Character Designer: Tomonori Kogawa
- Sub-Character Designer: Hiroyuki Kitazume
- Anime Character Designer: Tomonori Kogawa (credited as Miyo Sonoda)
- Mecha Designers: Studio Ammonite (design group) (Hiroshi Ogawa, Hirotoshi Ōkura, and Takashi Ono.)
- Chief Animation Director: Yutaka Arai
- Series Composition: Jinzō Toriumi
- Planning: Akira Inoue, Yoshimasa Ōnishi
- Music: Ken Satō, Yūji Dan

== Reception ==
Southern Cross was the least successful installment of the Super Dimension brand, and wrapped at episode 23. The toy sponsor, Popy, pulled out of its sponsorship before the series premiered which did not help selling it as lack of merchandise was often detrimental to such mecha franchises.

Anime News Network wrote: "It's lightweight, but fun and perhaps a bit better aged than its siblings in either the Super Dimensional or the Robotech universes." THEM Anime Reviews gave a rating of three out of five to Robotech: The Masters Saga and called it "a relatively enjoyable show" and "somewhat inferior" to the previous part of the series.

== Notes ==
Preceded by Super Dimension Century Orguss	Super Dimension series Super Dimension Cavalry Southern Cross	Succeeded by None
