= Super Dimension =

Super Dimension may refer to:

- The Super Dimension Trilogy, or Chōjikū Series (超時空シリーズ), the name of a science fiction mecha anime TV show trilogy referencing the term Hyperspace. It was produced in Japan during the early 1980s, financed by Big West Advertising, composed of the following unrelated shows:
  - Super Dimension Fortress Macross, a 1982 Japanese anime television series by Big West Advertising and Tatsunoko Production. Later the series was spun off as its own media franchise.
  - Super Dimension Century Orguss, a 1983 Japanese anime television series by Big West Advertising and Tokyo Movie Shinsha
  - Super Dimension Cavalry Southern Cross, a 1984 Japanese anime television series by Big West Advertising and Tatsunoko Production
- The Super Dimension Fortress Macross: Do You Remember Love?, a 1984 Japanese anime film based on The Super Dimension Fortress Macross by Big West Advertising and Tatsunoko Production
- The Super Dimension Fortress Macross: Flash Back 2012, a 1987 Japanese original video animation by Big West Advertising and Tatsunoko Production
- Super Dimensional Fortress Macross II: Lovers Again, a 1992–1993 Japanese original video animation, film, and manga sequel to The Super Dimension Fortress Macross series by AIC and Oniro

In video games:

- The Super Dimension Fortress Macross, a 1985 Japanese game for the Nintendo Famicom
- Super Dimension Fortress Macross: Scrambled Valkyrie, a 1993 Japanese 2D shooting game for the Super Famicom
- The Super Dimension Fortress Macross: Do You Remember Love?, a 1997 2D shooting game for the Sega Saturn
- The Super Dimension Fortress Macross, a 2003 Japanese 3D shooting game for the PlayStation 2
