= Mika Doi =

Japanese voice actress

- 土井 美加
- Born: Mika Itō; August 4, 1956 (age 70); Sendai, Miyagi, Japan
- Occupations: Actress; voice actress; narrator
- Years active: 1976-present

Mika Doi (土井 美加, Doi Mika; born August 4, 1956) is a Japanese actress, voice actress, and narrator who was born in Sendai.

== Filmography ==
=== Television animation ===
- Tokimeki Tonight (1982-1983) (Mieru) (ep 10, 24)
- Magical Princess Minky Momo (1982) (Mama)
- The Super Dimension Fortress Macross (1982) (Misa Hayase)
- Aura Battler Dunbine (1983) (Mabel Frozen)
- Genesis Climber Mospeada (1983) (Houquet et Rose)
- Magical Angel Creamy Mami (1983) (Natsume Morisawa)
- Heavy Metal L-Gaim (1984) (Full Flat)
- The Super Dimension Cavalry Southern Cross (1984) (Lana Isavia)
- Moomin (1990) (Too-Ticky)
- Yu Yu Hakusho (1992) (Woman)
- Sailor Moon (1993) (Queen Serenity)
- Fushigi Yuugi (1995) (Subaru)
- Neon Genesis Evangelion (1995) (Naoko Akagi)
- Wedding Peach (1995) (Raindevila)
- Rurouni Kenshin (1996) (Takani Megumi)
- Boys Over Flowers (1997) (Kaede Domyoji)
- Cowboy Bebop (1998) (Alisa)
- Crest of the Stars (1999) (Empress Ramaj)
- Ojamajo Doremi (1999) (Majo Tourbillon)
- Dual! Parallel Trouble Adventure (1999) (Ayuko Rara)
- One Piece (1999) (Koby)
- Daa! Daa! Daa! (2000) (Rui Yaboshi)
- Saikano (2002) (Shuuji's Mother)
- Air Master (2003) (Kaori Sakiyama)
- Futari wa Pretty Cure Splash Star (2006) (Saori Hyuga)
- Himawari! (2006) (Yatsugashira)
- Ouran High School Host Club (2006) (Kotoko Fujioka)
- Tokyo Ghoul (2014) (Kie Muramatsu)
- A Certain Magical Index III (2018) (Oyafune Monaka)
- Malevolent Spirits: Mononogatari (2023) (Tsumabiki)
- Kawagoe Boys Sing (2023) (Arisa Hibiki)
- Uzumaki (2024) (Yukie Saito)

Unknown date

- Agatha Christie's Great Detectives Poirot and Marple (Mary Purichādo)
- Canvas 2 ~Niji Iro no Sketch~ (Shizuka Misaki)
- Combat Mecha Xabungle (Gautsu Gamu)
- Legend of Heavenly Sphere Shurato (Trailō, the Trailokyavijaya Wisdom Queen)
- Hello! Lady Lynn (Misuzu Midorigawa)
- Hime-chan's Ribbon (Erika's Mother)
- Kiddy Grade (Eclipse)
- Kochikame (Reiko Katherine Akimoto)
- Mushishi (Narrator, Nui)
- Yu-Gi-Oh! 5D's (Ancient Fairy Dragon)

=== Original video animation ===
- Magical Angel Creamy Mami (1985) (Natsume Morisawa)
- Megazone 23 (1985) (Muller)
- Appleseed (1988) (Fleia)
- Angel Cop (1989) (Yō "Angel" Mikawa)
- Super Mario: Fire Brigade (1989) (Kaoru)
- Ys I: Ancient Books of Ys (1989) (Sarah)
- Devil Hunter Yohko (1990) (Principal)
- Iczer Reborn (1990) (Fiber)
- Mermaid's Forest (1991) (Towa)
- RG Veda (1991) (Kuyou)
- Idol Defense Force Hummingbird (1993) (Hazuki Toreishi)
- Neon Genesis Evangelion: Death & Rebirth (1997) (Naoko Akagi)
- Rurouni Kenshin: Reflection (2001) (Takani Megumi)

=== Theatrical animation ===
- Macross: Do You Remember Love? (1984) (Misa Hayase)
- The Super Dimension Fortress Macross (1987) (Misa Hayase)
- Kiki's Delivery Service (1989) (Ket's Mother)

=== Video games ===
- Shin Megami Tensei: Persona 2 – Innocent Sin (1999) (Junko Kurosu)
- Kingdom Hearts (2002) (Daisy Duck, Alice)
- Kingdom Hearts II (2005) (Daisy Duck)
- Kingdom Hearts II: Final Mix+ (2007) (Daisy Duck) (archived footage)
- Tales of Graces (2010) (Fodra Queen)
- Kinect Disneyland Adventures (2011) (Daisy Duck, Alice)
- Kingdom Hearts HD 2.5 Remix (2014) (Alice) (Re:Coded Cinematics)

=== Tokusatsu ===
- Choujin Sentai Jetman (xxxx) (Fortune-telling Jigen)

=== Dubbing roles ===
==== Live-action ====
- Julia Roberts
  - Flatliners (Rachel Manus)
  - Sleeping with the Enemy (Laura Williams Burney/Sara Waters)
  - Hook (Tinker Bell)
  - Stepmom (Isabel Kelly)
  - Erin Brockovich (Erin Brockovich)
  - The Mexican (Samantha Barzel)
  - Confessions of a Dangerous Mind (Patricia Watson)
  - Duplicity (Claire Stenwick)
  - Mother's Day (Miranda Collins)
- 24 (Teri Bauer (Leslie Hope))
- About a Boy (Christine (Sharon Small))
- Above the Law (1993 TV Asahi edition) (Sara Toscani (Sharon Stone))
- Alpha Dog (Olivia Mazursky (Sharon Stone))
- Apollo 13 (1999 NTV edition) (Marilyn Gerlach Lovell (Kathleen Quinlan))
- Bad Boys (Therese Burnett (Theresa Randle))
- Bad Boys for Life (Theresa Burnett (Theresa Randle))
- Beverly Hills Cop II (1990 Fuji TV edition) (Karla Fry (Brigitte Nielsen))
- BH90210 (Gabrielle Carteris/Andrea Zuckerman)
- The Big Lebowski (VHS/DVD edition) (Maude Lebowski (Julianne Moore))
- Born on the Fourth of July (VHS edition) (Donna (Kyra Sedgwick))
- Breaking and Entering (Amira Simić (Juliette Binoche))
- Bride of Chucky (Tiffany Valentine (Jennifer Tilly))
- Broadchurch (Detective Sergeant Ellie Miller (Olivia Colman))
- Broken Trail (Nola Johns (Greta Scacchi))
- The Burning (1985 Fuji TV edition) (Sally (Carrick Glenn))
- The Butler (2016 BS Japan edition) (Nancy Reagan (Jane Fonda))
- Child's Play (Karen Barclay (Catherine Hicks))
- Commando (Cindy (Rae Dawn Chong))
- Consenting Adults (Kay Otis (Rebecca Miller))
- Crash (Dr. Helen Remington (Holly Hunter))
- The Cure (2014 Star Channel edition) (The Girl (Edna Purviance))
- Cyborg (VHS edition) (Pearl Prophet (Dayle Haddon))
- Dance with Me (Ruby Sinclair (Vanessa Williams))
- Days of Thunder (Dr. Claire Lewicki (Nicole Kidman))
- Dead Again (Margaret Strauss / Grace (Emma Thompson))
- Doc Hollywood (Lou (Julie Warner))
- The Fan (Jewel Stern (Ellen Barkin))
- Flash Gordon (1992 TV Asahi edition) (Dale Arden (Melody Anderson))
- Forrest Gump (Mrs. Gump (Sally Field))
- Game of Death (Ann Morris (Colleen Camp))
- Game of Thrones (Catelyn Stark (Michelle Fairley))
- The Glenn Miller Story (2000 TV Tokyo edition) (Helen Burger Miller (June Allyson))
- The Greatest American Hero (Rhonda Blake (Faye Grant))
- Guilty as Sin (Jennifer Haines (Rebecca De Mornay))
- Halloween H20: 20 Years Later (Keri Tate / Laurie Strode (Jamie Lee Curtis))
- The Hard Way (Susan (Annabella Sciorra))
- Harlem Nights (Dominique La Rue (Jasmine Guy))
- Indiana Jones and the Kingdom of the Crystal Skull (Marion Ravenwood (Karen Allen))
- Jacob's Ladder (1993 NTV edition) (Jezebel Pipkin (Elizabeth Peña))
- Jennifer 8 (Helena Robertson (Uma Thurman))
- Kindergarten Cop (Joyce Palmieri / Rachel Myatt Crisp (Penelope Ann Miller))
- Legion (Melanie Bird (Jean Smart))
- Miss Peregrine's Home for Peculiar Children (Dr. Nancy Golan (Allison Janney))
- My Big Fat Greek Life (Aunt Voula (Andrea Martin))
- Nemesis (Julian (Deborah Shelton))
- Night of the Living Dead (1990) (Barbara (Patricia Tallman))
- Night of the Living Dead (1968) (2022 Blu-Ray edition) (Helen Cooper (Marilyn Eastman))
- Nothing but Trouble (Diane Lightson (Demi Moore))
- Pinocchio (Sofia (Lorraine Bracco))
- The Punisher (Sam Leary (Nancy Everhard))
- Raiders of the Lost Ark (1993 and 2012 DVD edition) (Marion Ravenwood (Karen Allen))
- Riding in Cars with Boys (Mrs. Teresa Donofrio (Lorraine Bracco))
- The Rink (2014 Star Channel edition) (The Girl (Edna Purviance))
- The Running Man (1989 Fuji TV edition) (Amber Méndez (María Conchita Alonso))
- Saw series (Jill Tuck (Betsy Russell))
- Scarface (1989 TV Asahi edition) (Gina (Mary Elizabeth Mastrantonio))
- Seed of Chucky (Netflix edition) (Tiffany Valentine (Jennifer Tilly))
- Sense and Sensibility (Elinor Dashwood (Emma Thompson))
- Six Feet Under (Ruth Fisher (Frances Conroy))
- Sleepless in Seattle (Annie Reed (Meg Ryan))
- Sommersby (Laurel Sommersby (Jodie Foster))
- Stand by Me (Gordie Lachance (Wil Wheaton))
- Universal Soldier (Veronica Roberts (Ally Walker))
- We Don't Belong Here (Nancy Green (Catherine Keener))
- Working Girl (Tess McGill (Melanie Griffith))

==== Animation ====
- Alice in Wonderland (Alice) [1984–2005 dubbing]
- Alvin and the Chipmunks (Jeanette Miller)
- A Bug's Life (Princess Atta)
- List of Japanese voice actors dubbing Disney characters|Classic short films (Chip), Daisy Duck and Minnie Mouse (Old edition)
- List of Japanese voice actors dubbing Disney characters|Classic short films (Chip), Daisy Duck (New edition)
- Curious George (Professor Wiseman)
- How the Grinch Stole Christmas (Cindy Lou Who)
- Ice Age: Continental Drift (Granny)
- Ice Age: Collision Course (Granny)
- The Land Before Time (Cera, Ducky) (instead of Rica Matsumoto and Satomi Kōrogi)
- Looney Tunes (Tweety Bird, Melissa Duck)
- Peter Pan (1953 film) (Wendy Darling)
- The Little Engine That Could (Missy/Jill)
- Song of the South (Johnny)
- The Many Adventures of Winnie the Pooh (Christopher Robin) [1984 dubbing]
- The Rechid Family (Mrs. Rechid)
- The Sword in the Stone (Arthur)
- Teenage Mutant Ninja Turtles (1987 TV series) (April O'Neil)
