= Super Dimension Century Orguss =

Japanese science fiction anime series

- Official Blu-Ray cover by Discotek.
- 超時空世紀オーガス
- Genre: Mecha, Military sci-fi, isekai
- Created by: Studio Nue
- Directed by: Noboru Ishiguro (chief); Yasuyoshi Mikamoto (chief)
- Series composition: Ken'ichi Matsuzaki
- Character designer: Haruhiko Mikimoto
- Music by: Kentarō Haneda
- Country of origin: Japan
- Original language: Japanese
- No. of episodes: 35

Production
- Producer: Toshitsugu Mukaitsubo
- Production company: Mainichi Broadcasting System; Tokyo Movie Shinsha

Original release
- Networks: JNN (MBS, TBS)
- Release: July 3, 1983 – April 8, 1984

Related
- Original video animation

Orguss 02
- Directed by: Fumihiko Takayama
- Produced by: Akira Inokuchi; Hirotake Kanda; Masato Terada; Yuka Ohnishi
- Written by: Hiroshi Yamaguchi; Mayori Sekijima; Yuji Kishino
- Music by: Torsten Rasch; Hikashu
- Studio: J.C. Staff
- Licensed by: NA: Manga Entertainment
- Released: December 5, 1993 – April 25, 1995
- Episodes: 6

Super Dimension Century Orguss (Japanese: 超時空世紀オーガス, Hepburn: Chōjikū Seiki Ōgasu) is an anime science fiction series produced by Tokyo Movie Shinsha. It inspired an OVA sequel series called Orguss 02. Orguss was the second part of the Super Dimension trilogy from Big West, preceded by The Super Dimension Fortress Macross and followed by The Super Dimension Cavalry Southern Cross..

Of the Orguss' 35 episodes, only 17 were available in English. They were available in dub-only format in the early 1990s on video tape from U.S. Renditions, before the majority of the company's shows (excluding Orguss) were bought up by Manga Entertainment. Manga Entertainment released Orguss 02 on both video tape and DVD.

On April 16, 2007, ImaginAsian announced that they would broadcast Super Dimension Century Orguss on ImaginAsian TV, and would thereafter give the series its first complete North American DVD release. The first 17 episodes would also have the old U.S. Renditions dub, but due to lack of sales, the program was discontinued. Discotek Media has since licensed the series for a DVD re-release in 2015. Discotek released Orguss on DVD on September 29, 2015, including the dub episodes. On September 28, 2021, Discotek released the complete 35-episode TV series on Blu-ray in North America. In August 2024, TMS started to release the series on their official Youtube Channel.

== Basic synopsis ==
The Orguss.

The year is 2062, and the world is at war. The two superpowers clash over the space elevator. Far more dangerous than atomic, biological, or chemical weapons are dimensional weapons, such as the Space/Time Oscillation Bomb. Despite the tremendous power of this bomb, it must be armed on-site by a team of engineers.

Desperately, the Freedom Space Corps launch an offensive to plant a Space/Time Oscillation Bomb and destroy the space elevator. During this attack, the engineers are forced to abort the mission and destroy the bomb before it can be properly armed. Enraged at the decision to abort and feeling that his comrades have died in vain, brash fighter pilot Kei Katsuragi haphazardly arms the bomb with severe repercussions.

A dimensional explosion transports Kei and his Bronco II variable fighter to a severely damaged future. There he is pursued for unknown reasons by the militaristic Chilam and aided by the Emaan, nomadic traders. Both sides have some unknown interest in Kei, referring to as a Tokuiten (特異点; lit. "singularity point"). Originally translated by US Renditions as "Differentiated Idioblast", it is more properly translated as "Singularity". In the ImaginAsian version, it has been translated as an "Idiosyncratic Point". After Kei's Bronco II is damaged during a fight the Emaan modify it into the Orguss, the eponymous mecha from the series, which was later adopted and mass-produced as the Orguss II.

== Characters ==
=== Crew of the Glomar ===
The main cast of Orguss. From left to right: Leeg, Shaya Thoov, Mimsy Larz, Kei Katsuragi, Slay, Maaie, Lieea and Mome. Jabby can be seen behind them.

Kei Katsuragi (桂木 桂, Katsuragi Kei)
Voiced by: Shō Hayami (Japanese); Tom Fahn (English)
Second Lieutenant of the Freedom Space Corps. Age 20. He was assigned a mission to escort and provide cover to a group of engineers who were arming the Space/Time Oscillation Bomb in order to destroy the Space Elevator. When circumstances force the mission to abort, Kei decides to properly arm the Space/Time Oscillation Bomb himself. This results in Kei being transported 20 years into the future, where he is found by a group of tradesfolk from Emaan, believing him to be the Singularity. Aside from being a formidable pilot, Kei is also a womanizer, having several different girlfriends which he dates alternately before he met the Emaans, in which he begins a new romantic relationship with Mimsy. Even in his relationship with Mimsy, Kei still tends to flirt with any other woman that catches his eye.
Mimsy Larz (ミムジィ・ラース, Mimujii Rāsu)
Voiced by: Run Sasaki/Kumi Sakuma (Super Robot Wars series) (Japanese); Melissa Fahn (English)
A 16-year-old Emaan girl. In the Glomar, she serves as the Vice-Captain and provides battle info and tactics. Her interest in Kei is, at first, because he is the Singularity. This means that she has been given orders by her family to return him to the Emaan country. As the series progresses, she begins to develop romantic feelings for Kei, even though she is engaged to Slay. Mimsy also acts as Kei's guide in learning the culture of the Emaans. Her family, along with Shaya's family, runs the Emaan country.
Shaya Thoov (シャイア・トーブ, Shaia Tōbu)
Voiced by: Kumiko Takizawa (Japanese); Dorothy Elias-Fahn (English)
Captain of the Glomar, she is also the head supervisor in the ship's marketing business as well as the Chief Operator of the Glomar's controls. Upon discovering Kei as a Singularity by Jabby, she is given orders to deliver Kei to the Emaan homeland as soon as possible. Shaya follows faithfully the Emaan customs and culture. Among those customs are dressing and taking baths even with men present and never being shy about it, which gives Kei an uncomfortable position of being a pervert when he and Shaya are together. This is because of the Emaan's biological nature. Emaan women lose their fertility at age 18, at which point they are no longer courted by Emaan men and are considered no longer as 'females'. Her family, along with Mimsy's family, runs the Emaan country.
Mome (モーム, Mōmu)
Voiced by: Sanae Miyuki (Japanese); Lucy Vargas (Eps. 1-9), Patty Spellman (Eps. 10-17) (English)
An android in the appearance of a little girl whom Kei bought from a small village. Her primary program is to faithfully serve the person who bought her, which in this case, was Kei. She is from the Mu race, a civilization known for its advanced machinery. Having a sophisticated AI, Mome possesses a variety of skills from cooking to nursing to repairing the Orguss with ease. Despite being an android, Mome is capable of expressing emotion and openly expresses her love for Kei and dreaming to be his wife.
Jabby (ジャビー, Jabī)
Voiced by: Banjō Ginga (Japanese); Steven Blum (English)
A dragon-like talking creature of the Glomar crew who came from an alternate Earth. Jabby appears having brown skin, large hind legs, long arms with three fingers, a tail, and a long neck. Jabby's tail is capable of detecting any dimensional activity nearby and thus allows him to sense Kei as a Singularity. It was him that proposed the name "Orguss" on Kei's newly built unit, named after the war god of his world.
Slay (スレイ, Surei)
Voiced by: Kōichi Hashimoto (Japanese); Bill Kestin (English)
Mimsy's fiancé. Slay serves as the secondary operator of the Glomar whenever Shaya takes a break or if the ship is not on auto-pilot. Slay highly dislikes Kei, blaming him for all the trouble and loss of the Glomar's crewmembers from the Chilam because of his status as a Tokuiten. Slay also dislikes Kei for forming a romantic relationship with Mimsy, making them rivals for her affections.
Maaie & Lieea (マーイ & リーア, Māi & Rīa)
Voiced by: Kiyomi Hanasaki (Maaie), Chika Sakamoto (Lieea) (Japanese); Debra Jean Rogers (Mai), Patricia Vega (Lieea) (English)
Twin sisters and the only members of the Glomar crew who are fighter pilots, aside from Kei. They control the Drifant-type ships M.Lover Maaie and Lieea respectively.
Gorv (ゴーヴ, Gōvu)
Voiced by: Kōichi Kitamura (Japanese); Dan Lorge (English)
The oldest member of the Glomar crew. His primary role in the ship is to negotiate with customers, persuading them to purchase whatever items the Glomar is selling. When asking for the name of Kei's newly built unit, he proposed the name 'Gamon'. He forms a close relationship with Kei.
Leeg (リーグ, Rīgu)
Voiced by: Takao Ōyama (Japanese); Adam Sholder (English)
Chief Engineer of the Glomar who oversaw the building of the Orguss. Like Slay, Leeg blames Kei for the Chiram's attempt to pursure the Glomar and the death of some of its crewmembers. However, upon learning of Kei's role as a Singularity, he accepts him as part of the crew.
Papty (パプティ, Paputi)
Voiced by: Yumi Takada (Japanese); Martie Miles (English)
Papty is a mother of two Emaan children and is often seen raising them. Her husband is killed in the first Chiram attack on the Glomar. When she is not raising her children, she works by providing maintenance and repairs to the Orguss and the Glomar. In one episode, she is seen putting her two children to sleep while simultaneously firing the Glomar's Machine Guns against enemy units.
Taii (大尉; lit. "Captain")
Voiced by: Yūsaku Yara (Japanese); Marvin Byrkett (English)
A Mu fighting robot. Taii's remains were recovered and later rebuilt by Mome. Taii has a personality of an old veteran soldier and strictly observes the combat tactics in his programming, which makes him a nuisance to most of the crew. Taii is equipped with multiple missiles in his chest that gives him enough firepower to destroy a Chiram unit.

=== The Chirams ===
Captain Roberto (ロベルト, Roberuto)
Voiced by: Takkō Ishimori (Japanese); Gary Dubin (English)
Captain of the Chiram Army. Upon learning of the Singularity's appearance, he begins his campaign to capture Kei, but fails due to Kei's ability as a pilot and his Orguss. Roberto's repeated failures result with the Chiram assigning someone else to capture Kei, and putting his rank in jeopardy. This drives Roberto to capture Kei by any means necessary.
Henry Staiger (ヘンリー・スタイガー, Henrī Sutaigā)
Voiced by: Kazuo Hayashi (Japanese); Steven Blum (English)
Lieutenant of the Chiram Army and Roberto's right-hand man.
Athena Henderson (アテナ・ヘンダーソン, Atena Hendāson)
Voiced by: Masako Katsuki (Japanese); Mimi Woods (English)
Ace pilot of the Chiram and Kei's rival in combat. Age 20. Her skills as a fighter pilot equally match those of Kei's thanks to her intensive training from her mentor, Orson D. Verne. She has made it her personal goal to defeat Kei and deliver him to the Chiram. Unbeknownest to her, Kei is actually her biological father and Tina is her biological mother.
Orson D. Verne (オルソン・D・ヴェルヌ, Oruson Dī Verunu)
Voiced by: Hirotaka Suzuoki/Kenyū Horiuchi (Super Robot Wars series) (Japanese); Victor Garcia (English)
Kei's best friend and Wingman in the Freedom Space Corps. He and Kei were together during the mission to destroy the Space Elevator. Like Kei, Orson was sent to the future. Upon his arrival, he met Tina and promised her that he will find Kei. Orson then joined the Chiram army and was assigned to pursue the Singularity, which he did not know was Kei himself. It is revealed that Orson is the second Singularity and that he and Kei are needed to restore the different worlds back to their former state. He also trained Athena in becoming the Chiram's ace pilot. This character's name was created as a tribute to actor/director Orson Welles and science fiction writer Jules Verne.
Jeffrey Wright (ジェフリー・ホワイト, Jefurī Howaito)
Voiced by: Yasuo Muramatsu (Japanese); Steven Blum (English)
Leader of the Chiram. Determined to save his people, he ordered his army to hunt down and capture the Singularity. He also ordered his engineers to develop a device as an alternative to the Singularity should his army fail. Jeffrey's goal is to restore the Chiram world and its people back to its former state, even at the expense of the other worlds and its inhabitants. This not only puts the Chiram at war with the Emaans, but also with the Mu race.

=== Other characters ===
Tina Henderson (ティナ・ヘンダーソン, Tina Hendāson)
Voiced by: Rihoko Yoshida (Japanese); Mimi Woods (English)
Kei's girlfriend before the explosion of the Space/Time Oscillation Bomb. Tina was pregnant with Kei's child before Kei was sent to the future. Fifteen years later after the Space/Time Oscillation Bomb exploded, a terminally ill Tina is met by Orson, who promises her he will find Kei. She dies before Kei's reappearance five years later.
Maneesha Thoov (マニーシャ・トーブ, Manīsha Tōbu)
Voiced by: Miyuki Ichijo
Shaia's twin sister. She is a member of the Thoov family that runs the Emaan country and orders the capture of Kei to restore the Emaan world by any means necessary, even if it means destroying the Glomar and its crew.
Jeanne (ジャンヌ, Jannu)
Voiced by: Rumiko Ukai (Japanese); Emma Jackson (English)
Leader of a rebel group aiding the Glomar Crew. Jeanne's home country, which is a dominant female society, was under the oppression of its ruler, Queen Marie, and requested the Glomar crew for aid. After Jeanne's country is freed from Marie's control, she provided sanctuary to the Glomar crew from their pursuers. It was Jeanne's appearance that gave clues to Kei about the different worlds of Earth being merged as one. Jeanne is loosely based on the national hero of France, Joan d'Arc while Queen Marie is loosely based on Marie Antoinette.

== Production ==
- Original Story: Studio Nue
- Direction: Noburo Ishiguro and Yasuyoshi Mikamoto
- Character Design: Haruhiko Mikimoto
- Mechanical Design: Kazutaka Miyatake
- Art Direction: Yoshiyuki Yamamoto
- Director of Photography: Masahide Ueda
- Music: Kentaro Haneda and Casey Rankin
- Opening/Ending Theme: "Hyōryū" (漂流, Sky Hurricane) / "The Heart is Gypsy" (心はジプシー)
- Lyricist: Miura Kousuke
- Composer / Arranger / Singer: Casey Rankin
- Music Direction: Seiji Suzuki
- Producer: Toshitsuga Mukaitsubo
- Executive Producers: Yutaka Fujioka and Yoshimasa Onishi

== Episode list ==
No.	Title	Original air date
1	"Space-Time Destruction" "Jikū Hakai" (時空破壊!!)	July 3, 1983
2	"Lonely Wolf" "Ronrī・Urufu" (ロンリー・ウルフ)	July 10, 1983
3	"Pretty Machine" "Puriti・Mashin" (プリティ・マシン)	July 17, 1983
4	"Caravan" "Kyaraban" (キャラバン)	July 24, 1983
5	"Lovers" "Ravāzu" (ラヴァーズ)	July 31, 1983
6	"Vanishing Point" "Banishingu・Pointo" (バニシング・ポイント)	August 7, 1983
7	"I Love You" "Ai・Rabu・Yū" (アイ・ラブ・ユー)	August 14, 1983
8	"Runaway" "Rannauei" (ランナウェイ)	August 21, 1983
9	"Revolution" "Reboryūshon" (レボリューション)	August 28, 1983
10	"Barbarians" "Bābarian"&nbsp(バーバリアン)	September 4, 1983
11	"Dummy" "Damī" (ダミー)	September 11, 1983
12	"Chiram Girl" "Chiramu・Gāru" (チラム・ガール)	September 18, 1983
13	"Caspian Crater" "Casupi・Kurētā" (カスピ・クレーター)	October 2, 1983
14	"Operation D" "Operēshon・D" (オペレーション・D)	October 9, 1983
15	"The Idioblast" "Tokui-Ten!!" (特異点!!)	October 16, 1983
16	"The Factory" "Mai・Fakutorī" (マイ・ファクトリー)	November 6, 1983
17	"Seventeen" "Sebentīn" (セブンティーン)	November 13, 1983
18	"Sisters" "Shisutāzu" (シスターズ)	November 20, 1983
19	"Time Slip" "Taimu・Surippu" (タイム・スリップ)	December 4, 1983
20	"Broken Through" "Burōken・Surū"&nbsp(ブロークン・スルー)	December 11, 1983
21	"Father" "Fāzā" (ファーザー)	December 18, 1983
22	"Reside or Decide" "Disaido" (ディサイド)	December 25, 1983
23	"Destroyer" "Desutoroiyā" (デストロイヤー)	January 8, 1984
24	"Mu" "Mū" (ムー)	January 15, 1984
25	"Chiram Soldier" "Chiramu・Sorujā" (チラム・ソルジャー)	January 22, 1984
26	"Breakdown" "Bureiki・Daun" (ブレイク・ダウン)	January 29, 1984
27	"Message" "Messēji" (メッセージ)	February 12, 1984
28	"Come Back Lover" "Kamubakku・Ravā" (カムバック・ラヴァー)	February 19, 1984
29	"Choice" "Choisu" (チョイス)	February 26, 1984
30	"Outsider" "Autosaidā" (アウトサイダー)	March 4, 1984
31	"Children" "Chirudoren" (チルドレン)	March 11, 1984
Kei and Mimsey meet and unto one another give visceral exchange; knowing well what is there, what they have, is something that cannot last. What follows is Kei's, Orson's, and Athena's hard sought realization and acceptance after the fact.
32	"Lost World" "Rosuto・Wārudo" (ロスト・ワールド)	March 18, 1984
33	"Last Charge" "Rasuto・Chāji" (ラスト・チャージ)	March 25, 1984
34	"Battlefield" "Senjō" (戦場)	April 1, 1984
35	"Space-Time Creation" "Jiku Sōzō" (時空創造)	April 8, 1984
With the help of the Chiram-Eram Alliance, friends, families, lovers, and those lost, Kei and Orson manage to do what it is fate demands them to. 'Fate' also plays a cruel trick as the last obstacle awaiting; no one could meet better than they themselves.

== Orguss 02 ==
Orguss 02 (オーガス 02, Ōgasu Zero Tsū) is a 6-episode anime OVA released in 1993 as a sequel to the Orguss TV series. It was released on DVD in the US and UK by Manga Entertainment.

Taking place 200 years after the story of Orguss, the OVA deals with an early industrial society finding advanced mecha weapons called Armors (referred to in Manga's translation as "Decimators") and how they are now used as tools of war. The story focuses on the question of why these mecha are present in this world, where they came from and the history surrounding them.

=== Main characters ===
Lean (リーン, Riin)
Voiced by: Shinichiro Ohta (Japanese); Stephen Apostolina (English)
Nataluma (ナタルマ, Nataruma)
Voiced by: Naoko Nakamura (Japanese); Heidi Lenhart (English)
Mannings (マニング, Maningu)
Voiced by: Kōichi Yamadera (Japanese); John Snyder (English)

=== Decimators ===
Lioh (Raiō)
Verifer (Berifā)
Orguss II (オーガスII, Ōgasu Tsū)

== OVA episode list ==
No.	Title	Original air date
1	"Fool's Luck"	December 5, 1993
A brief introduction into the lives of civilian salvagers: Lean and Zain, forcing into (Lieutenant Manning) militant confrontation between Zafran and Revillia.
2	"Where Angels fear to tread"	February 21, 1994
3	"Fugitives"	June 23, 1994
4	"Searcher"	September 24, 1994
5	"Destroyer"	January 21, 1995
6	"Those Who Wish For Tomorrow"	January 21, 1995
Moving now into the contemporary and after two hundred years of waiting circumstance and situation finally arrives for time to be corrected.

== Video games ==
A shoot 'em up game based on the original TV series was released in 1984 for the Sega SG-1000 game console in Japan and Europe.

This series is also included in the PlayStation 2 game Super Robot Wars Z released in 2008. In this game the plot of Orguss plays a central role, as it is the detonation of the Space-Time Oscillation Bomb (an event dubbed "Break the World") that unites the heroes, villains, and locales from the various anime featured in the game. Kei and Athena return in the game's sequel, Z2.

The dimensional phenomena stemming from the Space-Time Oscillation Bomb were eventually resolved in the final game of Z series, using three "Singularities" (Kei, Orson, and Xine, an original character that was also present at the detonation of the Space-Time Oscillation Bomb). This resulted in the various dimensions returning to their proper places. Kei also got the honor of saying the last voiced line of the Super Robot War Z series: "This will end everything,...! And, it is the beginning of multiple new worlds!!"

This series also appears in the 2010 videogame Another Century's Episode: R for the PlayStation 3.

== Macross cameo ==
A mecha from the Orguss series can be seen fighting alongside other Macross Destroids in front of the bridge of the SDF-1 Macross in the last episode of Television version of The Super Dimension Fortress Macross. The mecha in question was Kei's Orguss which was shown holding a shield and a rifle in the other arm for a moment before being shattered by incoming enemy fire.

In episode 2 of Orguss, several Macross characters make appearances. Minmay, Shammy, and Vanessa are shown at 15:16 as the main character recalls past girlfriends. Misa Hayase briefly appears on the monitor of the alien fighter as it turns on at 20:28 among other images of apparent static. The image of Misa on the monitor is shown to not be wearing clothes.

In episode 18, there is a storage crate on the Guruma merchant ship marked "Valkyrie VF-1J".

In episode 34, the SDF-1 in attack mode appears in a battle scene at the space elevator.

Preceded by Super Dimension Fortress Macross	Super Dimension series Super Dimension Century Orguss	Succeeded by Super Dimension Cavalry Southern Cross
