= Super Dimension Fortress Macross =

Science fiction anime series

- Cover of the Region 1 DVD release by Harmony Gold USA and ADV Films featuring main characters Lynn Minmay, Misa Hayase and Hikaru Ichijyo.
- 超時空要塞マクロス
- Genre: Military sci-fi; Mecha; Romance
- Created by: Studio Nue; Artland (cooperation)
- Developed by: Kenichi Matsuzaki
- Directed by: Noboru Ishiguro
- Voices of: Arihiro Hase; Mari Iijima; Mika Doi
- Music by: Kentarō Haneda
- Opening theme: "Macross"; by Makoto Fujiwara
- Ending theme: "Runner"; by Makoto Fujiwara (#1–35); and Mari Iijima (#36)
- Country of origin: Japan
- Original language: Japanese
- No. of episodes: 36 (list of episodes)

Production
- Producers: Akira Inoue; Hiroshi Iwata
- Editors: Masami Tashiro; Sachiko Miki
- Production companies: Mainichi Broadcasting System; Tatsunoko Production; Anime Friend

Original release
- Network: JNN (MBS, TBS)
- Release: October 3, 1982 – June 26, 1983

Related
Further information
Manga
Macross: The First
Written by	Haruhiko Mikimoto
Published by	Kadokawa Shoten
Magazine	Macross Ace (2009–2011); Newtype Ace (2011–2013); ComicWalker (2013–2014)
Original run	January 26, 2009 – April 29, 2014 (indefinite hiatus)
Volumes	6
Related franchises
Macross; Super Dimension; Robotech

U.N. Spacy Roundel

Super Dimension Fortress Macross (Japanese: 超時空要塞マクロス, Hepburn: Chōjikū Yōsai Makurosu) is a Japanese science fiction anime television series produced by Tatsunoko Production. It is the first part of the Super Dimension trilogy and the Macross franchise. The series aired in Japan from October 1982 to June 1983. According to Shōji Kawamori, it depicts "a love triangle against the backdrop of great battles" during the first human-alien war.

Macross features mechanical designs by Kazutaka Miyatake and Shoji Kawamori (both of Studio Nue) and character designs by Haruhiko Mikimoto of Artland. Macross also created one of the first anime idols Lynn Minmay, turning her voice actress Mari Iijima into an instant celebrity, and launching her musical career. Most of its animation (with edited content, story changes and revised dialogue) was adapted in the United States for the first saga of Robotech.

== Plot ==
In 1999, a city-sized alien spacecraft crashes in South Ataria Island on Earth. Over the course of 10 years the military organization U.N. Spacy reverse-engineers its technology and rebuilds the spacecraft, naming it the SDF-1 Macross. In 2009 at the launch ceremony of the Macross, a young civilian pilot, Hikaru Ichijyo, comes to visit the Macross upon U.N. Spacy pilot Roy Focker's request. During the launch ceremony, a space war fleet from an alien race of humanoid giants arrives in the Solar System and identifies the Macross as a former battleship used by their enemies, the Supervision Army. As the aliens, known as the Zentradi, approach the Macross, the original systems override the crew's commands and fire its main cannon, wiping out the advance alien scouts and starting a war. While Hikaru takes the new VF-1 Valkyrie on a test flight, the aliens retaliate. He then encounters Lynn Minmay and rescues her from the aliens. The Macross crew attempts to use the experimental "Fold System" (faster-than-light drives) to escape to the Moon's orbit, but instead it accidentally takes the Macross and South Ataria Island to the edge of the solar system. The people from the Macross salvage everything they can, including the city surrounding the ship and its civilians (who have survived in special safety shelters, which were transported along intact), and attach two aircraft carriers to the ship. Since the fold systems have vanished after the jump, the Macross is forced to make its way back to Earth by conventional power.

The Zentradi suspect the humans might be their creators, the Protoculture. Under the command of Britai Kridanik and Exsedol Folmo, they plot ways to understand them. Fearful of their old combat directives of not interfering with Protoculture, the Zentradi perform attacks to test their theories about the people on board the Macross, and even have their Zentradi soldiers "micloned" (miniaturized) to learn more about their culture. The Zentradi capture several Macross personnel, including Officer Misa Hayase and Hikaru, to study. Boddole Zer, Supreme Commander of the Zentradi, is puzzled over things such as relationships amongst males and females. He confirms that the Miclones "are" Protoculture during a demonstrated kiss between Hayase and Hikaru. After escaping, Hikaru and the others report their findings to their superiors, who have trouble accepting the reasons behind the Zentradi attacks as well as the huge forces the aliens possess.

After much difficulty returning to Earth, the UN Spacy refuses to allow the Macross and the civilian passengers to return to land. Minmay's cousin, Lynn Kaifun, decides to join the Macross to see his parents and also look after Minmay. Because of Kaifun's relationship and constant contact with Minmay, the pair eventually enter a romantic relationship. After deliberation, the UN Spacy orders the Macross to leave Earth as a means to get the Zentradi away from them. During these events, a female Zentradi ace fighter pilot, Milia Fallyna, is micloned and attempts to assassinate Maximilian Jenius, an ace UN Spacy pilot. Attempting to kill him during a knife duel, Milia is defeated and falls in love with Max, and the two are subsequently married. Their wedding aboard the Macross is broadcast to the Zentradi as a message that aliens and humans can co-exist. Since the Zentradi's exposure to culture and to Lynn Minmay's songs, some of them become eager to join the humans. Believing the "miclone contamination" is becoming a threat to all Zentradi forces, Boddole Zer orders his entire army to exterminate the human race and all those Zentradi previously exposed to human culture. Because Britai Kridanik was "contaminated" as well, he works with the humans to defeat the main Zentradi forces.

The resulting battle culminates in the large scale devastation of Earth, but the people of the SDF-1 survive. After Boddole Zer is killed and his armada defeated, the surviving humans and their Zentradi allies begin rebuilding Earth.

Two years after the end of the first Space War, the transition into the Human ways becomes difficult to some Zentradi who cannot stand the idea of a pacified life. Quamzin Kravshera constantly incites conflicts towards the civilians. He repairs a damaged Zentradi warship to return to his old ways and attacks the new Macross City built around the SDF-1. Moments before the final Zentradi attack, Misa Hayase tells Hikaru Ichijyo of her feelings for him and her decision to leave to space in a colonization mission to preserve human culture across the galaxy. Lynn Minmay, who was left by Kaifun and now loves Hikaru, does not want him to leave to join the fight. However, Hikaru still goes to defend the city anyway. Eventually Quamzin is killed. After a long emotional conflict Hikaru finally decides to be with Misa and join the colonization mission, but the two remain good friends with Minmay in the end.

== Production ==
The series title uses the name of the main spacecraft (which is usually shortened to Macross as it is Earth's first Super Dimension Fortress). The original name for the Macross project was Battle City Megaload (or Battle City Megaroad, as the Japanese transliteration to either ⟨l⟩ or ⟨r⟩ gives the title a double meaning in reference to the story line: Megaload, referring to the spacecraft containing an entire city of people; and Megaroad, referring to the long journey through space back to Earth). However, the director of Big West, one of the later sponsors of the project, was a fan of Shakespeare and wanted the series and the spacecraft to be named Macbeth (Makubesu (マクベス)). A compromise was made with the title Macross (Makurosu (マクロス)) due to its similar pronunciation to Macbeth in Japanese and because it still contained connotations to the original title. The word Macross also comes from a wordplay combination of the prefix "macro" in reference to its massive size (though when compared with the alien ships in the series, it is only a relatively small capital ship) and the distance they must cross.

"Super Dimension Fortress" prefix ("Chō Jikū Yōsai") is a wordplay on an intermediary working title for the series, which was originally "Super Dreadnought Fortress Macross" ("Chō Dokyū Yōsai Makurosu").

Originally proposed in 1980 and greatly inspired by Mobile Suit Gundam (1979–1980), the show created by Studio Nue (from an original concept by newcomer member Shoji Kawamori) was initially sponsored by a group called the "Wiz" (Uizu) Corporation that was prepared to fund a 48-episode run. "Wiz" wanted to produce the Sci-Fi show as an outer space comedy, but this clashed with Studio Nue's original idea of a more serious and epic "space opera" storyline. The resulting animosity between both companies made the initial pre-production of the series very difficult and full of delays.

However, by 1981 Wiz had gone out of business and the "Megaload/Megaroad" (Macross) project seemed to be in permanent hiatus. Studio Nue bought the rights of the show from "Wiz" and searched for a sponsor with no avail. Big West, an advertising agency looking to branch out into animation sponsorship, approached Studio Nue about the project and agreed to sponsor it. Big West insisted on a leaner budget, not convinced that the show would pan out as profitable and pared the episode count to 27 episodes (meaning the show would have ended with the battle against Boddole Zer's fleet). Even then, Big West found that the show was going to run more expensive than it had bargained for, and to secure more money, entered into a partnership with animation studio Tatsunoko Production which included international distribution (what would culminate in the creation of the "Robotech" adaptation a few years later).

When Macross was first put in production, the anime was going to end with a total of 24 episodes. However, when the show debuted on 3 October 1982 (with only three episodes made so far), its stunning success among Japanese television audiences convinced Big West to approve an extension to 36 episodes, allowing the staff to end with the "two years after" story arc.

Animation work was contracted out to a number of sub-contracting studios, including Artland (Haruhiko Mikimoto's employer), the nascent AIC and Gainax studios, as well as the Tatsunoko-supplied AnimeFriend and Star Pro.

There were plans for a splashy ending to the series that would have shown major characters Misa Hayase and Hikaru Ichijo blasting off in the colonization ship SDF-2 Megaroad-01, but the sequence was scrapped due to lack of time and budget. However, due to fan demand this sequence was later used in the Macross Flashback 2012 OVA released in 1987.

Super Dimension Fortress Macross was produced as the first of the three Super Dimension mecha anime television series in Japan. It was followed by Super Dimension Century Orguss (1983) and Super Dimension Cavalry Southern Cross (1984). These shows were related in name only.

== Media ==
=== Anime ===
In 1984, Harmony Gold USA licensed the first Macross series from Tatsunoko and planned to dub the series on home video. In 1985, Harmony Gold, without permission from Studio Nue or Big West, edited and rewrote the series with The Super Dimension Cavalry Southern Cross and Genesis Climber Mospeada, collectively releasing them as Robotech, to syndicate on weekday television and to promote a Revell model line. Robotech's credits listed only the English adaptation's production crew and two Tatsunoko producers. No mention of the creators is shown in the credits. In 1999, Harmony Gold asserted it had exclusive rights to the "distribution of the Macross television series and the right to create and authorize the sale of merchandise based on such series" outside Japan, and began sending cease-and-desist letters to import toy dealers, temporarily barring Macross-related merchandise from North America.

The merchandise has since been imported again by the same toy dealers in direct sales.

In 2000, Big West and Studio Nue took Tatsunoko Production to the Tokyo District Court over who had the rights to the first Macross series, due to Harmony Gold's attempt to bar Japanese Macross merchandise in North America the previous year. During production, Big West entered into a partnership with Tatsunoko to assist in the production of the series in a deal where it acquired the license to distribute the show worldwide (i.e., outside Japan), as well as earning some royalties to the merchandise. Tatsunoko then sub-licensed Macross to Harmony Gold USA in 1984. In 2002, the Tokyo District Court ruled that Big West/Studio Nue is the sole owner of the original character and mecha designs for the first series, while that same court ruled in 2003 that Tatsunoko owned the production rights to the first series.

In 2001 the series was sub-licensed in North America by AnimEigo, who restored the series and released it unedited on DVD with Japanese audio and English subtitles. At first a limited edition pre-order boxset across nine discs was released on 21 December 2001. Preorders were available on AnimEigo's web store. Three smaller boxsets, each comprising three discs, were released from 10 September 2002. Finally, AnimEigo released nine individual volumes. In 2003 Madman Entertainment released a six-disc PAL format version of this edition entitled Macross Ultimate Collection.

In the summer of 2005, ADV Films announced that it would be releasing an English dub of Macross on 10 January 2006. This is the first uncut, unedited English dub for Super Dimension Fortress Macross, and featured Mari Iijima returning to reprise the role of Lynn Minmay. This version was released by Hulu for online streaming in the United States in February 2010 and was removed in February 2013.

On April 8, 2021, Harmony Gold and Big West reached an agreement to allow Big West to release Macross globally, but the original series remains unreleased.

=== Manga ===
Four manga adaptations of the TV series by different artists were serialized in 1982. A new manga adaptation called Super Dimension Fortress Macross: The First (超時空要塞マクロス THE FIRST, Choujikuu Yousai Macross the First) began releasing in Japan in 2009. It is a comic format alternate telling of the events in The Super Dimension Fortress Macross (with modern character and mecha designs) that was serialized in the Macross Ace manga magazine until its cancellation, being moved to Newtype Ace manga magazine until its cancellation, then to ComicWalker online magazine, and then to Cygames Psychomi online magazine. It was collected into six volumes. The artist for the new manga series is Haruhiko Mikimoto, who was the character designer for the original Macross.

=== Video games ===
A game based on the TV series called The Super Dimension Fortress Macross was released for the Japanese Nintendo Family Computer console in 1985 by video game company Namco.

Years later Bandai released The Super Dimension Fortress Macross 3D shooting game in October 2003 in Japan for the Sony PlayStation 2 console. This game had levels based in both the TV series and its movie adaptation.

More recently, a new 3D shooting game called Macross Ace Frontier included several elements from the original series. It was developed by Artdink for the Sony PSP and was released in 2008.

== Reception and legacy ==
In the Anime Encyclopedia, authors Jonathan Clements and Helen McCarthy called the series "One of the three unassailable pillars of anime sci-fi, pioneering the tripartite winning formula of songs, battling robot-planes and tense relationships."

Super Dimension Fortress Macross was the basis for two different animated franchises, Macross in Japan and Robotech in North America. In Japan, Super Dimension Fortress Macross spawned an animated film adaptation, Macross: Do You Remember Love? (1984), and a number of sequels, including Macross Plus (1994), Macross 7 (1994), Macross Frontier (2007) and Macross Delta (2015). In North America, Super Dimension Fortress Macross was adapted into the first saga of the Robotech television series (1985–1986), called The Macross Saga, which spawned the Robotech franchise. Robotech was influential in the Western world, helping to introduce the anime medium to North America. In 1996, Hyper magazine reviewed The Macross Saga, rating it 10 out of 10.

Macross popularized the concept of transforming mecha, which can transform between a standard vehicle (such as a fighter plane or transport truck) and a fighting mecha robot. Shōji Kawamori introduced the concept with Diaclone in 1980 and then popularized it with Macross. Kawamori then went on to design transforming mecha for Transformers (1986). The transforming mecha concept became popular in the mid-1980s, with Macross: Do You Remember Love? and Zeta Gundam (1985) in Japan, and with Robotech and Transformers in the West. Transformers went on to influence the Hollywood movie industry.

In contrast to earlier mecha anime which focused on combatants, Macross portrayed a mecha conflict from the perspective of non-combatant civilians, such as the fictional singer Lynn Minmay. She went on to become the first virtual idol. Voiced by Mari Iijima, Minmay was the first fictional idol singer to garner major real-world success, with the theme song "Do You Remember Love?" (from the film Macross: Do You Remember Love?) reaching number seven on the Oricon music charts in Japan. This was later further explored in Macross Plus with the virtual idol Sharon Apple, an artificial intelligence (AI) computer program who takes the form of an intergalactic pop star, and in Macross 7 with the virtual band Fire Bomber who became a commercial success and spawned multiple CDs released in Japan. Macross set the template for later virtual idols in the early 21st century, such as Hatsune Miku and Kizuna AI.

Another innovative character concept in Macross was the role of Misa Hayase, who was one of the main commanders of the Macross battleship. She was the boss and commanding officer of the fighter pilot protagonist Hikaru Ichijyo, and later his love interest. This was a scenario Kawamori came up with which he had not seen in any Hollywood movies before. A similar scenario, however, later appeared in the Hollywood movie Top Gun (1986). According to Kawamori, "Many people pointed out that later films like Top Gun copied that idea and setting, as well as including the combination of many songs and fighters too."

For the video game Devil May Cry 4, motion and voice actor Reuben Langdon was told to be cockier than his younger persona, albeit more mature. Despite the staff's concerns for the difficulties of such a portrayal, Langdon had no issues after choosing Roy Focker from The Super Dimension Fortress Macross as his character model and noting he had almost the same age as Dante during the production of the game.

First	Super Dimension series Super Dimension Fortress Macross	Succeeded by Super Dimension Century Orguss
