= List of Super Dimension Fortress Macross episodes =

Cover of the ADV Macross Box Set

Super Dimension Fortress Macross is an anime series created by Studio Nue. The series ran from October 3, 1982, to June 26, 1983, over 36 episodes. In 2000 the series was licensed by AnimEigo, who restored the series and released it on DVD with Japanese audio and English subtitles. At first a limited edition pre-order boxset was released on December 21, 2001. Three smaller boxsets, each comprising three discs, were released from September 10, 2002. Finally, Animeigo released 9 individual volumes.

The series was then licensed by ADV, who re-released the series with an English dub alongside the original Japanese audio and English subtitles. The seven individual volumes were released between January 10, 2006, and December 19, 2006, and a complete collection followed on October 21, 2008.

In Japan, a boxset containing the entire series created from HD remastered video was released as "The Super Dimension Fortress Macross Memorial Box" on February 22, 2008. The Series uses two pieces of music as opening and ending themes. The opening theme "Macross" and the ending theme "Runner" were both performed by Makoto Fujiwara. Episode 36 used a version of "Runner" performed by Mari Iijima.

== Episodes ==
No.	Title	Directed by	Written by	Original release date
1	"Booby Trap"; Transliteration: "Būbī Torappu" (Japanese: ブービー·トラップ)	Fumihiko Takayama	Kenichi Matsuzaki	October 3, 1982
The story begins in 1999: a giant alien spacecraft crash-lands on South Atalia Island. Humanity proceeds to attempt to rebuild this marvel, but political conflicts centered around the Macross - coupled with proposals for a one-world government - result in a global war. After 10 years, the 'Unification Wars' are finally over, the new United Nations government is in power, with the UN Spacy as their military arm. It's 2009: The work on the Macross is now complete. On the day of launching ceremony, its main cannon fires on its own, destroying an alien spacecraft in orbit. This automatic action marks the beginning of the war between the humans and Zentradi, a race of humanoid warriors of gigantic size.
2	"Countdown"; Transliteration: "Kaunto Daun" (Japanese: カウント·ダウン)	Fumihiko Takayama; Yoshizo Tsuda	Kenichi Matsuzaki	October 10, 1982
Air racer and stunt pilot Hikaru Ichijo and his 'senpai' (elder) Major Roy Focker attempt a daring rescue mission when South Atalia Island is invaded and bombarded by Zentradi forces. Hikaru has his first encounter with Lynn Minmay, a young waitress, as Zentradi mecha begin raiding the city. Meanwhile, Captain Bruno J. Global, Lieutenant Misa Hayase, Bridge Operator Claudia LaSalle, and the crew of the Macross attempt to launch the ship for the first time.
3	"Space Fold"; Transliteration: "Supēsu Fōrudo" (Japanese: スペース·フォールド)	Shoichi Yasumura	Kenichi Matsuzaki	October 17, 1982
With Hikaru still reeling from the horrors he's witnessed first-hand from both sides, events take a turn for the worse when the space folding system of the Macross (a faster-than-light travel technology) teleports it and the city on South Atalia Island to the edge of the Solar System and in front of Pluto.
4	"Lynn Minmay"; Transliteration: "Rin Minmei" (Japanese: リン·ミンメイ)	Fumihiko Takayama	Noboru Ishiguro	October 31, 1982
With the fold systems now vanished, Captain Global and his crew come to a realization that the Macross must make a long journey back to Earth. The civilians from South Atalia Island - along with their shops and homes - are brought onto the ship. Meanwhile, Hikaru and Minmay are trapped within the confines of the Macross. Hikaru learns much about Minmay and begins a new friendship with her.
5	"Transformation"; Transliteration: "Toransu Fōmēshon" (Japanese: トランス·フォーメーション)	Shoichi Yasumura	Sukehiro Tomita	November 7, 1982
Zentradi commander Britai Kridanik and his archivist, Exsedol Folmo, begin suspecting that the humans (or 'miclones') are the long-lost 'Protoculture' and send attack waves to test their theory. During a Zentradi attack, Global orders the Macross to "reconfigure" itself to combat mode in order to fend them off. However, the move proves disastrous for the unsuspecting civilians and infrastructure. Roy and Minmay convince Hikaru to join the UN Spacy fleet on the Macross so he could continue flying.
6	"Daedalus Attack"; Transliteration: "Daidarosu Atakku" (Japanese: ダイダロス·アタック)	Fumihiko Takayama	Sukehiro Tomita	November 14, 1982
Using a defensive anomaly left behind after the disappearance of the fold systems, and the rings of Saturn to hide the Macross, Misa and Claudia devise a new attack strategy against the Zentradi.
7	"Bye Bye Mars"; Transliteration: "Baibai Marusu" (Japanese: バイバイ·マルス)	Shoichi Yasumura	Kenichi Matsuzaki	November 21, 1982
After a few months of fighting, the Macross arrives at Mars. Detecting an abandoned base on the planet's surface, the crew land the ship to gather much needed supplies. Quamzin Kravshera, a brilliant but unstable Zentradi commander, attacks the Macross. Meanwhile, Misa requests permission to investigate an emergency signal from within the base.
8	"Longest Birthday"; Transliteration: "Rongesuto Bāsudē" (Japanese: ロンゲスト·バースデー)	Man Ende	Kenichi Matsuzaki	November 28, 1982
As Minmay celebrates her birthday, Hikaru begins to wonder about his relationship with Minmay. Hikaru is promoted and has Maximillian Jenius and Hayao Kakizaki assigned as his wingmen. Quamzin mounts another strike against the Macross whilst Hikaru wonders if he'll celebrate Minmay's birthday in time.
9	"Miss Macross"; Transliteration: "Misu Makurosu" (Japanese: ミス·マクロス)	Hiroyuki Yamaga	Sukehiro Tomita	December 5, 1982
A TV station is launched on the Macross, and to celebrate, the first ever 'Miss Macross' beauty pageant takes place. Minmay enters, but by doing so she ends up missing dinner with Hikaru on the same night. A Zentradi spy ship approaches the Macross and with Max and Kakizaki on leave, Hikaru intercepts it alone.
10	"Blind Game"; Transliteration: "Buraindo Gēmu" (Japanese: ブラインド·ゲーム)	Hiroshi Yoshida	Kenichi Matsuzaki	December 12, 1982
Rori, Konda and Warera - three Zentradi spies who mounted the spy plane in the previous episode - report to Britai and Exsedol on their findings. The Earth refuses to aid the Macross after contact is made for the first time in months. Meanwhile, Quamzin disobeys orders and attacks the Macross radar array, forcing the crew of the ship to send a recon plane to guide them away from the Zentradi.
11	"First Contact"; Transliteration: "Fāsuto Kontakuto" (Japanese: ファースト·コンタクト)	Fumihiko Takayama	Sukehiro Tomita	December 19, 1982
After being captured by the Zentradi, Misa, Hikaru and Kakizaki are 'interviewed' on human culture by Britai, Exsedol, and Supreme Commander of all Zentradi forces, Golg Boddole Zer - marking the first verbal encounter between the two races. They discover that the Zentradi have no sense of culture and fear intimacy between men and women. Max, having been separated from the others, formulates a plan to rescue them. Meanwhile, Minmay begins a singing career on the Macross.
12	"Big Escape"; Transliteration: "Biggu Esukēpu" (Japanese: ビッグ·エスケープ)	Katsuhito Akiyama	Sukehiro Tomita	December 26, 1982
As the four miclone prisoners attempt to make their escape, a fearsome female Zentradi pilot, Milia Fallyna, attempts to approach the Macross on her Queadluun-Rau powered armor to help sneak aboard the three Zentradi spies - now micronized to human size.
13	"Blue Wind"; Transliteration: "Burū Uindo" (Japanese: ブルー·ウインド)	Hiroshi Tanaka	Kenichi Matsuzaki	January 9, 1983
With Earth only two days away by full speed, Global decides to ram the Macross through a Zentradi blockade. Meanwhile, Rori, Konda and Warera begin to explore human culture up close in micronized form.
14	"Global Report"; Transliteration: "Gurōbaru Repōto" (Japanese: グローバル·レポート)	Noboru Ishiguro	Noboru Ishiguro	January 16, 1983
In this clip show, Global recounts the events of the story up to this point.
15	"Chinatown"; Transliteration: "Chaina Taun" (Japanese: チャイナ·タウン)	Fumihiko Takayama	Kenichi Matsuzaki	January 23, 1983
Whilst Misa and Global travel to the Alaskan headquarters of the new UN, Hikaru escorts Minmay to Japan so that she could visit her parents. Lynn Kaifun, a relative of Minmay, joins the Macross to see his parents and protect Minmay.
16	"Kung Fu Dandy"; Transliteration: "Kanfū Dandi" (Japanese: カンフー·ダンディ)	Shoichi Yasumura	Hiroshi Ōnogi	January 30, 1983
The crew of the Macross are informed to not let anyone, including civilians, leave the ship, so as to keep the truth of the Zentradi's existence from causing widespread panic. The civilians within the Macross become increasingly unruly and violent toward the military personnel and crew members. Meanwhile, Quamzin returns, breaking orders and attacking the Macross while it sits in the Atlantic ocean.
17	"Phantasm"; Transliteration: "Fantazumu" (Japanese: ファンタズム)	Noboru Ishiguro	Noboru Ishiguro	February 13, 1983
A special clip episode where following a severe injury sustained in the previous episode, an incapacitated Hikaru lies in a hospital bed inside the Macross, dreaming about the previous events and his developing relationship with Misa and his ill-fated friendship with Minmay.
18	"Pine (pineapple) Salad"; Transliteration: "Pain Sarada" (Japanese: パイン·サラダ)	Fumihiko Takayama	Hiroyuki Hoshiyama	February 20, 1983
With Hikaru still recovering, Roy has Max and Kakizaki assigned to his Skull Squadron as his wingmen. Milia attacks the Macross with her Queadluun-Rau squadron, however, she has a personal vendetta against an ace human pilot that Quamzin believes she can't defeat.
19	"Burst Point"; Transliteration: "Bāsuto Pointo" (Japanese: バースト·ポイント)	Katsuhito Akiyama	Sukehiro Tomita	February 27, 1983
Still feeling the effects of a tragic loss from the previous battle, Hikaru is assigned a new Valkyrie fighter. Global wants to test out a barrier defense system against a new attack by Quamzin. But for the Ontario region where the battle takes place, this could end in disaster. And in the female Zentradi fleet, Milia approaches her commander, Moruk Laplamiz, to gain permission to be micronized so she could infiltrate the Macross.
20	"Paradise Lost"; Transliteration: "Paradaisu Rosuto" (Japanese: パラダイス·ロスト)	Hiroshi Yoshida	Kenichi Matsuzaki	March 6, 1983
After the catastrophic events in the previous encounter with the Zentradi, the UN orders the Macross to leave Earth in order to give the UN Spacy more time to formulate a defense plan against the aliens. Returning once more to Britai's ship, the macronized Zentradi spies bring back 'samples' of culture to their dumbfounded comrades.
21	"Micro Cosmos"; Transliteration: "Mikuro Kosumosu" (Japanese: ミクロ·コスモス)	Tatsuya Katsuhara	Hiroshi Ōnogi	March 13, 1983
Milia is now aboard the Macross as a spy and marvels at human culture. The premiere of Minmay's film Shao Pai Long (Little White Dragon) takes place. A Zentradi attack prompts another transformation to combat mode, and Hikaru and Misa end up being trapped within the walls of the ship, where they end up learning more about each other. Milia continues to search for the miclone pilot who defeated her.
22	"Love Concert"; Transliteration: "Rabu Konsāto" (Japanese: ラブ·コンサート)	Katsuhito Akiyama	Hiroyuki Hoshiyama	March 20, 1983
Zentradi soldiers - having experienced and enjoyed some elements of human culture brought back by the three spies - attempt to defect to the Macross. A Daedalus Attack on Britai's ship allows them to pour through. During a concert by Minmay, a confusing three-way battle ensues inside the ship, with Zentradi refugees against Quamzin's forces, and the unwitting UN Spacy on the other side.
23	"Drop Out"; Transliteration: "Doroppu Auto" (Japanese: ドロップ·アウト)	Shoichi Yasumura	Hiroshi Ōnogi	March 27, 1983
The battle within the city comes to a close, with the surviving Zentradi defectors coming to terms with the destruction they caused. Along with Rori, Konda and Warera, the defectors are all given asylum within the Macross. Misa prepares to travel back to Earth to the UN Headquarters, whilst Hikaru begins to further contemplate his feelings for her.
24	"Good-bye Girl"; Transliteration: "Gubbai Gāru" (Japanese: グッバイ·ガール)	Fumihiko Takayama	Sukehiro Tomita	April 3, 1983
Max has a chance encounter with Milia in a video game arcade, and proceeds to defeating her a second time during a game. They arrange to have a date in the park later, where Milia secretly plans to destroy him. Misa is escorted back to Earth by Hikaru, so that she could meet her father.
25	"Virgin Road"; Transliteration: "Bājin Rōdo" (Japanese: バージン·ロード)	Hiroshi Yoshida	Sukehiro Tomita	April 10, 1983
Max encounters Milia in the park and a knife fight between them ensues when she reveals that she is a Zentradi. Max defeats her for the third time, sparing her life, and the two fall in love. Milia decides to join the Macross and their immediate marriage marks the first union between a human and Zentradi, causing celebrations everywhere along Macross City. Boddole Zer, on the other hand, doesn't like the idea and plans to fix the 'contamination' that is human culture once and for all.
26	"Messenger"; Transliteration: "Messenjā" (Japanese: メッセンジャー)	Katsuhito Akiyama	Kenichi Matsuzaki	April 17, 1983
In a surprising turn of events, Exsedol Folmo is micronized and attempts to seek peace negotiations with the people of the Macross. During the negotiations, Exsedol reveals that the defection of the Zentradi soldiers could be related to a new cultural awakening caused by Minmay's songs. Hikaru begins to long for Misa, who is still on Earth, trying to convince her father and the UN that the two races may have a chance of co-existing peacefully.
27	"Love Flows By"; Transliteration: "Ai wa Nagareru" (Japanese: 愛は流れる)	Noboru Ishiguro; Tatsuya Katsuhara	Kenichi Matsuzaki	April 24, 1983
An epic battle for the Earth takes place when Boddole Zer's main fleet of over 4,000,000 warships fold above Earth's atmosphere. Using the power of culture from Lynn Minmay's singing, the Macross, along with its allied Zentradi fleet, attempts a daring last stand to Boddole Zer's forces. Heroes will die, a world may fall, but will love prevail?
28	"My Album"; Transliteration: "Mai Arubamu" (Japanese: マイ·アルバム)	Fumihiko Takayama	Hiroyuki Hoshiyama	May 1, 1983
Two years have passed after the final battle with Boddole Zer. The Macross is now a relic of the conflict known as Space War I, and sits in a large lake in barren Alaska. Earth is still a desolate wasteland, and small towns and forests are located miles around Macross City. The allied Zentradi fleets, along with the citizens from the Macross, maintain a nervous peace. The work to rebuild Earth by both sides is in full swing. Hikaru looks back on the times spent with Roy Focker for advice on what do about his feelings for both Misa and Minmay.
29	"Lonely Song"; Transliteration: "Ronrī Songu" (Japanese: ロンリー·ソング)	Shoichi Yasumura	Sukehiro Tomita	May 8, 1983
As some of the giant Zentradi begin to rebel over their new way of life with the humans, Minmay's fame begins to slip away. Wandering around from tour to tour of the local towns, Minmay contemplates at what could have been a serious relationship with the now distant Hikaru.
30	"Viva Maria"; Transliteration: "Biba Maria" (Japanese: ビバ·マリア)	Tatsuya Katsuhara	Hiroshi Ōnogi	May 15, 1983
Max, Milia, and their baby daughter, Komilia Maria, play a crucial role in the capture of a Zentradi satellite factory - the source of the overtechnology of which the aliens rely on.
31	"Satan's Dolls"; Transliteration: "Satan Dōru" (Japanese: サタン·ドール)	Katsuhito Akiyama	Sukehiro Tomita	May 22, 1983
Exsedol and Global gather the crew of the Macross to reveal the origin of the nomadic Zentradi at last. Meanwhile, Quamzin's forces attempt to steal a macronization chamber.
32	"Broken Heart"; Transliteration: "Burōkun Hāto" (Japanese: ブロークン·ハート)	Hiroshi Yoshida	Hiroshi Ōnogi	May 29, 1983
Quamzin kidnaps Minmay and Kaifun, and holds them for ransom. Hikaru and his squadron prepare a rescue mission.
33	"Rainy Night"; Transliteration: "Reinī Naito" (Japanese: レイニー·ナイト)	Tatsuya Katsuhara	Hiroyuki Hoshiyama	June 5, 1983
As Misa begins to realize she may be losing Hikaru to Minmay, Claudia helps her friend by recounting her early experiences with Roy Focker.
34	"Private Time"; Transliteration: "Puraibēto Taimu" (Japanese: プライベート·タイム)	Katsuhito Akiyama	Hiroshi Ōnogi	June 12, 1983
The love triangle between Hikaru, Misa and Minmay intensifies when he decides to skip out on a picnic with the commander, so he could have lunch with the pop idol instead. Giant Zentradi rebellions begin heating up, making matters worse for the humans.
35	"Romanesque"; Transliteration: "Romanesuku" (Japanese: ロマネスク)	Fumihiko Takayama	Sukehiro Tomita	June 19, 1983
It's Christmas Time, and Minmay's life begins to spiral into depression forcing her to seek Hikaru, which further isolates Misa. Quamzin's forces attack Onogi City on Christmas Eve to capture a reaction (Nuclear power) engine power condenser. Max and Milia's squadron is ambushed as they intercept, and Milia faces Laplamiz during the showdown.
36	"Farewell To Tenderness"; Transliteration: "Yasashisa Sayonara" (Japanese: やさしさサヨナラ)	Shoichi Yasumura	Shōji Kawamori	June 26, 1983
Global informs Misa that the SDF-2, the successor to the Macross, is nearly ready to begin colonizing the galaxy - with her as the captain of the mission. Now that the reaction engine is built into his craft, Quamzin, Laplamiz, and their henchmen attack Macross City with missiles and waves of mecha. Hikaru, Misa and Minmay's love triangle reaches its climax, as Hikaru must decide whether he will go with the pop idol who brushed him aside and now desperately needs him, or the military commander who loves him deeply, but may leave him forever by the line of duty.
