= List of animated television series of 2009 =

A list of animated television series first aired in 2009.

Animated television series first aired in 2009
Title	Seasons	Episodes	Country	Year	Original channel	Technique
Abby's Flying Fairy School	4	26	United States	2009–12	PBS Kids	CGI
The Adventures of Digger and Friends	1	5	United States	2009	Fox Sports	CGI
The Adventures of Water Wally	1	9	Singapore	2009	Okto	Flash
Ahmed & Salim	2	13	Israel	2009–10	Bip	Flash
The Amazing Spiez!	2	52	France; Canada	2009–12	TF1/Canal J Teletoon; Télétoon	Traditional (2009–10); Flash (2010–12)
Angel's Friends	2	104	Italy	2009–10	Italia 1	Flash
Angelina Ballerina: The Next Steps	4	40	United Kingdom; United States	2009–10	Nick Jr. PBS Kids	CGI
Annoying Orange	18	855	United States	2009–present	YouTube	Syncro-Vox/Live action Flash
Ape Escape	1	38	United States	2009	Nicktoons Network	Flash
Archer	14	145	United States	2009–23	FX (2009–16); FXX (2017–23)	Flash
Ariol	2	118	Canada; France	2009–17	TF1; Piwi+	Flash
Arròs covat	3	36	Spain	2009–12	El 33	Flash
B.F.F.: Best Friends Forever	1	78	France	2009	France 3	Flash
Ballybraddan	1	20	Ireland	2009	RTÉ	Flash
Beached Az	2	21	Australia	2009–10	ABC2	Flash
Ben & Holly's Little Kingdom	2	104	United Kingdom	2009–13	Five; Nick Jr.	Flash
Big Green Rabbit	1	13	United States	2009–11	PBS Kids	Flash/Live action
Bob & Doug	2	15	Canada	2009–11	Global	Flash
Boo & Me	2	26	Malaysia	2009–11	KidsCo	Flash
Bruno the Great	1	18	Italy	2009	Disney XD	Flash
Bugwatch	1	26	Spain	2009	Clan	CGI
Bun & Bunee	1	52	South Africa	2009–11	SABC 3	CGI
Bunny Maloney	1	52	France; Ireland	2009	Canal+ Canal+ Family; Game One; Kabillion	CGI
Cajou	1	52	France	2009	Playhouse Disney	Flash
Casper's Scare School	2	52	United States; France; India	2009–12	Cartoon Network; TF1	CGI
Celebs	1	15	Israel	2009	yes stars Israeli	Flash
Chorr Police	3	41	India	2009–12	Disney XD	Flash/Traditional
Chumballs	1	26	France	2009	France 5	Traditional
Clang Invasion	1	26	Canada; Singapore; Hong Kong	2009–10	YTV	Flash
Clara in Foodland	2	26	Brazil; Mexico; Chile	2009–11	Discovery Kids	CGI/Flash
CJ the DJ	1	52	Australia; Malaysia; France	2009–10	ABC3	Flash
The Cleveland Show	4	88	United States	2009–13	Fox	Flash (2009–10); Traditional (2010–13)
Colorful Rainbow	1	9	Israel	2009	Hop! Channel	Flash
Culture Quest with Mister Otter	1	52	France	2009	France 3	CGI
Dennis the Menace and Gnasher	2	104	United Kingdom; Australia	2009–13	CBBC; Nine Network	Traditional (series 1); Flash (series 2)
Dinosaur Baby Holy Heroes	3	156	China	2009–11	China Central Television	Traditional
Dinosaur Train	5	100	United States; Canada; Singapore	2009–21	PBS Kids	CGI
dirtgirlworld	1	52	Canada; Australia	2009–11	ABC Kids; CBC Television	CGI; Synchro-Vox/Live action
DJ & the Fro	1	12	United States	2009	MTV	Flash
Dogga Doop	1	52	Thailand	2009	Channel 3	CGI
Doggy Day School	2	52	Brazil; Canada	2009–11	Nickelodeon; APTN; TVOKids; Knowledge Network; SCN	Flash
The Electric Company	3	52	United States	2009–11	PBS Kids Go!	Flash/Traditional/Stop motion/Live-action
Experimento Wayapolis	1	13	Chile	2009	TVN	Flash/Live-action
Fanboy & Chum Chum	2	52	United States	2009–12	Nickelodeon	CGI
Fanthomas	2	16	Norway	2009		Flash
Figaro Pho	1	26	Australia	2009	ABC	CGI
Fishtronaut	2	104	Brazil; Canada	2009–15	Discovery Kids	Flash (season 1) Toon Boom (season 2)
Fraochy Bay	5	60	United Kingdom	2009–15	BBC Alba	Flash
Fruity Robo	4		China	2009–present		CGI
Fun with Claude	1	52	United Kingdom; Germany	2009–11	Playhouse Disney; KI.KA	Flash
G.I. Joe: Resolute	1	11	United States	2009	Adult Swim Video	Traditional
Garage Club	1	26	France	2009	France 4 Nickelodeon	CGI
Garth and Bev	1	26	Ireland; Canada	2009	RTÉ Two; CBeebies (United Kingdom)	Flash
Gaston	1	78	France	2009	France 3	
Gawayn	2	104	France; Italy (season 1); Canada (season 2)	2009–13	France 3 and Rai 3 (season 1); Canal+ Family; Gulli (season 2)	Flash
Geronimo Stilton	3	78	Italy; France	2009–17	Rai 2 Rai Gulp; M6 (seasons 1–2); France 5 (season 3)	Traditional
Gladiators	1	26	Italy	2009	Rai Due	Traditional
Glenn Martin, DDS	2	40	United States; Canada	2009–11	Nick at Nite	Stop motion
Globul-X	1	13	France	2009		CGI
Go! Calf	1	52	China	2009		Traditional
Go for Speed	1	64	China	2009	CCTV	Traditional
The Goode Family	1	13	United States	2009	ABC	Traditional
Green Saver	1	26	South Korea	2009–10	SBS	
Guess with Jess	2	52	United Kingdom; Canada	2009–13	CBeebies; Treehouse TV	CGI
Hakremboys	1	15	Israel	2009–10	Nickelodeon	Flash/Live action
Have a Laugh!		60	United States	2009–12	Disney Channel	Traditional
Hero Kids	1	26	Spain	2009–10	La 2	Traditional
A Horinha dos Kidz		28	Portugal	2009	ZON Kids	Flash
Hot Wheels Battle Force 5	2	52	United States; Canada	2009–11	Teletoon; Cartoon Network	CGI
Humf	1	78	United Kingdom	2009	Nick Jr.	Flash
Huntik: Secrets & Seekers	2	52	Italy	2009–11	Rai Due	Traditional
I.N.K. Invisible Network of Kids	1	26	France	2009–10	France 3	Flash
Igam Ogam	2	52	United Kingdom; Germany; Ireland (season 2)	2009–13	Channel 5 S4C; ZDF	Stop motion
Iljimae The Animation	1	26	South Korea	2009	SBS	Traditional
Iron Man: Armored Adventures	2	52	France; India; United States; Luxembourg; Isle of Man (season 1)	2009–12	France 2 France 4 Nicktoons	CGI
Jimmy Two-Shoes	2	52	Canada	2009–11	Teletoon; Jetix/Disney XD	Toon Boom (season 1); Flash (season 2)
Jungle Junction	2	45	United States; United Kingdom	2009–12	Disney Channel (season 1); Disney Junior (season 2)	CGI
Kabouter Wesley	1	37	Belgium	2009–10	Één	Flash
Keloğlan Masalları	7	89	Turkey	2009–20	TRT Çocuk	CGI
Kiara e os Luminitos	1	13	Brazil	2009	TV Rá-Tim-Bum	Flash
Kim	1	26	Italy	2009	Rai Due	Traditional
Kung Fu Dino Posse	1	40	Canada; South Korea; Singapore; Germany	2009–10	KBS1	Traditional
League of Super Evil	3	52	Canada	2009–12	YTV	CGI
Lelik i Barbariki	1	15	Russia	2009	Destkiy	Flash
Leon	1	52	France, Germany	2009–10	France 3, Super RTL	CGI
Léonard	1	78	France	2009	Canal J	CGI
Li'l Vinnie's Art		21	United States, Israel	2009	BabyFirstTV	Flash
Little Krishna		13	India	2009	Nickelodeon; Discovery Kids; Sun TV; Pogo TV	CGI
Little Nick	2	104	France	2009–11	M6	CGI
Little Princess School	5	15	Brazil	2009	TV Rá-Tim-Bum	Flash
Little Wizard Tao	2	52	South Korea; China	2009–13	KBS2 (season 1); KBS1 (season 2)	CGI
Lou!	1	52	France	2009–10	M6	Traditional
Lu and Bun		55	Vietnam	2009	HTV7	CGI
Ludovic	1	26	Canada, Germany, Netherlands	2009	KI.KA	Stop Motion
Lulu's Islands	1	52	France	2009	TF1	Flash
Maiquan & Keke			China	2009	CCTV	
Manon	1	52	Canada; France	2009	TiJi; Télévision de Radio-Canada	CGI
Masha and the Bear	7	169	Russia	2009–present	Russia-1	CGI
Mat Kacau	1	26	Malaysia	2009	Astro Ceria	Flash
MetaJets	1	40	South Korea; Canada	2009	Teletoon	Traditional
Mia's Secret	2	52	Israel	2009–10	Nickelodeon	Flash
Mickey's Farm	5	143	Canada	2009–13	The Pet Network	Flash/Live action
Mini Wakfu	1	27	France	2009	France 3	
Monk Little Dog	1	52	France; South Korea	2009–10	Canal+ EBS	CGI
Mouss & Boubidi	1	52	France; Canada	2009–11	France 3 (2009–11); France Ô (2011); Télévision de Radio-Canada	Flash
Mr. Baby	1	48	France	2009–10	France 3	Flash/Toon Boom Harmony
Mult lichnosti	4	48	Russia	2009–13	Channel One	CGI
My Giant Friend	1	52	France; South Korea	2009–10	France 3	CGI
Nan & Lil	4	300	Qatar	2009	Baraem	CGI
Nelly & Caesar	2	52	Canada; France	2009	Playhouse Disney; TFO; TVOKids; Knowledge Network	CGI
Noddy in Toyland	1	52	Ireland; United Kingdom	2009	Five	CGI
Noonbory and the Super Seven	1	26	Canada; South Korea	2009–12	Knowledge Network; Access TV; BBC Kids; SCN; EBS	CGI
Olivia	2	40	United Kingdom; United States; Ireland	2009–15	Nickelodeon; Nick Jr. Channel; Five	CGI
OOglies	3	46	United Kingdom	2009–15	CBBC	Stop motion
Outer Space Astronauts	1	5	United States	2009	Syfy	CGI/Live action
OVNI	2	104	France	2009–12	Canal+ Family	Flash
PangPond the Hero Begins	1	26	Thailand	2009	Channel 3	CGI
O Papel das Histórias	1	13	Brazil	2009	TV Rá-Tim-Bum	Flash
Pearlie	1	26	Canada; Australia	2009–11	YTV; Network Ten	Flash
Pipi, Pupu and Rosemary	2	104	Italy	2009	Rai Tre, Rai Yoyo	Flash
Pixel Pinkie	2	52	Australia	2009	Nine Network	Flash
The Podcats	3	78	France	2009	France 3	CGI
Poppets Town	1	26	Canada; Spain; Japan	2009–11	Knowledge Network and TVOKids (Canada); Playhouse Disney and Disney Channel (Spain); Disney Channel, Disney Junior and TVQ Kyushu Broadcasting (Japan)	Flash
Popzilla	1	12	United States	2009	MTV	Flash
Portuguesitos Esporte Clube	2	26	Brazil	2009–10	TV Rá-Tim-Bum	Flash
Producing Parker	2	26	Canada; Philippines	2009–11	TVTropolis (2009–10); Global (2009); Bite (2010–13)	Flash
PsicoVip	1	26	Italy	2009	Rai Due	CGI
Quarto do Jobi	1	26	Brazil	2009–10	TV Rá-Tim-Bum	Flash
Quíromon	1	20	Chile	2009	etc... TV	Flash
Rocket Jo	1	52	France	2009	France 3	CGI
RollBots	1	26	Canada	2009	YTV; Radio-Canada	CGI
Rolling Stars	1	26	South Korea	2009	KBS2	
Ronny the Raccoon	1	26	Israel	2009	Hop! Channel	Flash
Roy	4	52	Ireland	2009–15	CBBC	Flash/Live action
Rubi	4	579	China	2009–15		CGI
Rudolf	1	52	Germany, France	2009	KI.KA	Flash/Traditional
Saari	1	52	Spain	2009	TV3	Flash
Sally Bollywood: Super Detective	2	104	France; Australia	2009–13	France 3 Seven Network (season 1); 7two (season 2)	Flash
The Samsonadzes	1	18	Georgia	2009–10	Imedi TV	CGI
The Sandpixies	3	39	Germany	2009–17	KI.KA	
Sandra the Fairytale Detective	1	52	Spain (Galicia); India; Belgium	2009–10	Clan	Flash
Sit Down, Shut Up	1	13	United States	2009	Fox	Traditional
Special Agent Oso	2	60	United States	2009–12	Disney Channel	CGI
Spliced	1	26	Canada	2009–10	Teletoon	Flash
Stoked	2	52	Canada	2009–13	Teletoon	Flash
The Super Hero Squad Show	2	52	United States	2009–11	Cartoon Network	Traditional
Super Inggo at ang Super Tropa	1	14	Philippines	2009–10	ABS-CBN	Traditional
Taratabong	1	52	Italy	2009	Rai Tre	CGI
Ted Sieger's Molly Monster	2	52	Germany; Sweden; Switzerland	2009–11	KI.KA	Flash
Timmy Time	3	80	United Kingdom	2009–12	CBeebies	Stop-motion
Titan Maximum	1	9	United States	2009	Adult Swim	Stop motion
Traçando Arte	3	39	Brazil	2009–14	TV Rá-Tim-Bum	CGI
The Twisted Whiskers Show	1	52	United States; Canada; Ireland; India	2009–10	The Hub; Teletoon	CGI
Wachendó	1	12	Colombia	2009	Caracol Televisión	Traditional
Waybuloo	3	150	United Kingdom; Canada	2009–12	CBeebies; Treehouse TV	CGI
What's Your News?		52	Australia; Canada; United Kingdom	2009–10	Kids' CBC	CGI/Live action
Whiz Kid	1	25	Israel	2009	Hop! Channel	Flash
Wibbly Pig	1	26	United Kingdom; Canada	2009–10	CBeebies	Flash
Wolverine and the X-Men	1	26	United States	2009	Nicktoons	Traditional
The WotWots	2	78	New Zealand	2009–11	TVNZ 2 Kidzone 24; ABC Kids	CGI/Live action
YooHoo & Friends	3	65	South Korea	2009–15	KBS2 (2009); KBS1 (2013–15)	Flash
Zigby	1	52	Australia; Canada; Singapore	2009–11	ABC Kids; Treehouse TV	CGI

Anime television series first aired in 2009
Title	Episodes	Country	Year	Original Channel	Technique
07-Ghost	25	Japan	2009		Traditional
11eyes	12	Japan	2009	Chiba TV	Traditional
Akikan!	12	Japan	2009		Traditional
Anyamaru Tantei Kiruminzuu	50	Japan	2009–10	TXN	Traditional
Aoi Bungaku	12	Japan	2009		Traditional
Astro Fighter Sunred 2	26	Japan	2009–10		Traditional
Asura Cryin'	13	Japan	2009		Traditional
Asura Cryin' 2	13	Japan	2009		Traditional
Bakemonogatari	15	Japan	2009–10		Traditional
Bakugan Battle Brawlers: New Vestroia	52	Japan	2009–10	Teletoon	Traditional
Basquash!	26	Japan	2009		Traditional
Beyblade: Metal Fusion	51	Japan	2009–10		Traditional
Birdy the Mighty: Decode 02	12	Japan	2009		Traditional
Canaan	13	Japan	2009		Traditional
A Certain Scientific Railgun	24	Japan	2009–10		Traditional
Cheburashka Arere?	26	Japan	2009–10		
Chi's Sweet Home: Chi's New Address	104	Japan	2009		Traditional
Chrome Shelled Regios	24	Japan	2009		Traditional
La Corda d'Oro: Secondo Passo	2	Japan	2009		Traditional
Corpse Princess: Kuro	12	Japan	2009		Traditional
Cross Game	50	Japan	2009–10		Traditional
Darker than Black: Gemini of the Meteor	12	Japan	2009		Traditional
Dragon Ball Z Kai	97	Japan	2009–11		Traditional
Eagle Talon The Countdown	11	Japan	2009		Flash
Eden of the East	11	Japan	2009		Traditional
Element Hunters	39	Japan; South Korea	2009–10		Traditional
Erin	50	Japan	2009		Traditional
Fairy Tail	175	Japan	2009–13		Traditional
First Love Limited	12	Japan	2009		Traditional
Fresh Pretty Cure!	50	Japan	2009–10		Traditional
Fullmetal Alchemist: Brotherhood	64	Japan	2009–10		Traditional
GA Geijutsuka Art Design Class	12	Japan	2009		Traditional
Genji Monogatari Sennenki	11	Japan	2009		Traditional
The Girl Who Leapt Through Space	26	Japan	2009		Traditional
Gokujō!! Mecha Mote Iinchō	51	Japan	2009–10		
Guin Saga	26	Japan	2009		Traditional
Hajime no Ippo: New Challenger	26	Japan	2009		Traditional
Hanasakeru Seishōnen	39	Japan	2009–10		Traditional
Haruka Nogizaka's Secret: Purezza	12	Japan	2009		Traditional
Hayate the Combat Butler!!	25	Japan	2009		Traditional
Heaven's Lost Property	13	Japan	2009		Traditional
Higepiyo	39	Japan	2009–10		Traditional
Hipira	12	Japan	2009		
Inuyasha: The Final Act	26	Japan	2009–10		Traditional
Jewelpet	52	Japan	2009–10		Traditional
Juden Chan	12	Japan	2009		Traditional
K-On!	13	Japan	2009		Traditional
Kaidan Restaurant	23	Japan	2009–10		Traditional
Kämpfer	12	Japan	2009		Traditional
Kanamemo	13	Japan	2009		Traditional
Kiddy Girl-and	24	Japan	2009–10		Traditional
Kimi ni Todoke	25	Japan	2009–10		Traditional
Kobato	24	Japan	2009–10		Traditional
Kon'nichiwa Anne: Before Green Gables	39	Japan	2009		Traditional
Kurokami: The Animation	23	Japan	2009		Traditional
Kuruneko	100	Japan	2009–11		
Mainichi Kaasan	142	Japan	2009–12		
Maria Holic	12	Japan	2009		Traditional
Maria-sama ga Miteru	13	Japan	2009		Traditional
Marie & Gali	40	Japan	2009–10		
Mazinger Edition Z: The Impact!	26	Japan	2009		Traditional
The Melancholy of Haruhi Suzumiya Season 2	14	Japan	2009		Traditional
Minami-ke: Okaeri	13	Japan	2009		Traditional
Miracle Train: Ōedo-sen e Yōkoso	13	Japan	2009		Traditional
Modern Magic Made Simple	12	Japan	2009		Traditional
Natsu no Arashi!	13	Japan	2009		Traditional
Natsu no Arashi! Akinai-chū	13	Japan	2009		Traditional
Natsume's Book of Friends Continued	13	Japan	2009	TV Tokyo	Traditional
Needless	24	Japan	2009		Traditional
Nyan Koi!	12	Japan	2009		Traditional
Pandora Hearts	25	Japan	2009		Traditional
Phantom ~Requiem for the Phantom~	26	Japan	2009		Traditional
Princess Lover!	12	Japan	2009		Traditional
Queen's Blade: The Exiled Virgin	12	Japan	2009		Traditional
Queen's Blade 2: The Evil Eye	12	Japan	2009		Traditional
Rideback	12	Japan	2009		Traditional
Ristorante Paradiso	11	Japan	2009		Traditional
Romance of the Three Kingdoms	52	Japan; China	2009	CCTV-8	Traditional
The Sacred Blacksmith	12	Japan	2009		Traditional
Saki	25	Japan	2009		Traditional
Samurai Harem: Asu no Yoichi	12	Japan	2009		Traditional
Sengoku Basara: Samurai Kings	12	Japan	2009		Traditional
Shangri-La	24	Japan	2009		Traditional
Shin Koihime Musō	12	Japan	2009		Traditional
Shinkyoku Sōkai Polyphonica Crimson S	12	Japan	2009		Traditional
Shugo Chara! Party!	25	Japan	2009–10		Traditional
Slap-up Party: Arad Senki	26	Japan	2009		Traditional
Slayers Evolution-R	13	Japan	2009		Traditional
Sora no Manimani	12	Japan	2009		Traditional
Sora o Miageru Shōjo no Hitomi ni Utsuru Sekai	9	Japan	2009		Traditional
Sōten Kōro	26	Japan	2009		Traditional
Spice and Wolf II	12	Japan	2009		Traditional
Spicy Boy	42	Japan	2009–19	Cartoon Network	Flash
Stitch! ~The Mischievous Alien's Great Adventure~	29	Japan	2009–10		Traditional
Student Council's Discretion	12	Japan	2009		Traditional
Sugarbunnies: Fleur	26	Japan	2009		Traditional
Sweet Blue Flowers	11	Japan	2009		Traditional
Taishō Baseball Girls	12	Japan	2009		Traditional
Tamagotchi!	143	Japan	2009–12	TXN	Traditional
Tatakau Shisho: The Book of Bantorra	27	Japan	2009–10		Traditional
Tayutama: Kiss on my Deity	12	Japan	2009		Traditional
Tears to Tiara	26	Japan	2009		Traditional
Tegami Bachi	25	Japan	2009–10		Traditional
Tokyo Magnitude 8.0	11	Japan	2009		Traditional
The Tower of Druaga: The Sword of Uruk	12	Japan	2009		Traditional
Umi Monogatari	12	Japan	2009		Traditional
Umineko When They Cry	26	Japan	2009		Traditional
Valkyria Chronicles	26	Japan	2009		Traditional
Viper's Creed	12	Japan	2009		Traditional
Warai no Show Gakkou	20	Japan	2009–10	NHK E	
Weiß Survive	16	Japan	2009		Traditional
Weiß Survive R	12	Japan	2009–10		Traditional
Welcome to Irabu's Office	11	Japan	2009		Traditional
Whispered Words	13	Japan	2009		Traditional
White Album	26	Japan	2009		Traditional
Winter Sonata	26	Japan; South Korea	2009–10		Traditional
Yumeiro Patissiere	50	Japan	2009–10		Traditional
Zan Sayonara, Zetsubou-Sensei	13	Japan	2009		Traditional

== See also ==
- List of animated feature films of 2009
- List of Japanese animation television series of 2009
