= List of Sora no Manimani episodes =

The cover of the first Japanese DVD compilation, released by Sony Pictures on September 2, 2009

Sora no Manimani is an anime television series produced by Studio Comet, and based on the manga series by Mami Kashiwabara. The episodes are directed and written by Shinji Takamatsu, and features character designs by Hajime Watanabe who based the designs on Kashiwabara's original concept. The story focuses on Saku Ōyagi, a quiet bookworm who moves back to his old town and meets his childhood friend Mihoshi Akeno, though Saku initially does not want to even see her. After they manage to repair their friendship, Saku joins the astronomy club that Mihoshi is a member of.

Twelve episodes were produced which aired in Japan from July 7 to September 22, 2009, on AT-X. Six DVD compilation volumes were released by Sony Pictures Entertainment between September 2, 2009, and January 20, 2010. Two pieces of theme music are used for the episodes; one opening theme and one ending theme. The opening theme is "Super Noisy Nova" by Sphere, and the ending theme is "Hoshikuzu no Surround" (星屑のサラウンド, Hoshikuzu no Saraundo) by CooRie.

== Episode list ==
No.	Title	Original release date
1	"Welcome to the Astronomy Club!"; Transliteration: "Tenmonbu e Yōkoso!" (Japanese: 天文部へようこそ!)	July 7, 2009
After having moved away several years earlier, Saku Ōyagi returns to his hometown to begin his high school life. Saku has always enjoyed simply staying home and reading books, but his childhood friend Mihoshi Akeno used to forcibly take him outside to take part in various activities. On their last day together, Mihoshi fell out of a tree, causing Saku to go to the hospital with a broken arm, and since then Saku has never wanted to see Mihoshi again. However on his first day at high school, he meets Mihoshi as she is trying to recruit members into the astronomy club. Saku attempts to avoid her as well he can, but after Saku realizes that the reason Mihoshi did not see him off years ago was because she too was in the hospital, Saku makes up with Mihoshi, and joins the astronomy club.
2	"First Star"; Transliteration: "Fāsuto Sutā" (Japanese: ファーストスター)	July 14, 2009
No one besides Saku has joined the astronomy club, so recruiting tactics are still going on. Hime Makita from Saku's class is annoyed that Mihoshi and other astronomy members come to their class so often when she would rather spend some time alone with Saku. Hime met him on the bus to take the entrance exam of the school they now attend, and was thrilled to see they were put in the same class. After Hime finds out that Saku and Mihoshi are not dating, Hime joins the astronomy club, which finally becomes officially recognized. Another day, the astronomy club members go stargazing far from the city's lights.
3	"Planetarium"; Transliteration: "Puranetariumu" (Japanese: プラネタリウム)	July 21, 2009
Mihoshi has been bothering Saku too much lately so he takes a break from the club and goes to the library where he meets the student council president Fumie Kotozuka by chance. After talking with her, Saku realizes Mihoshi is merely expressing her feelings honestly like she always has and Saku agrees to accompany her with stargazing. However, the rainy season begins causing Mihoshi to get very depressed over the cloudy skies. With Saku's suggestion, the astronomy club goes to the planetarium and are shown the summer constellations. After the rain ends, Mihoshi wants the club to go on a summer stargazing camp.
4	"Until Daybreak"; Transliteration: "Yoake Made" (Japanese: 夜明けまで)	July 28, 2009
The president of the astronomy club organizes the stargazing camp, but before they go, Hime becomes agitated that Mihoshi is all over Saku, and she yells out asking what she thinks of him. Mihoshi replies that she loves him, but follows it up saying that she loves everyone else too. After they arrive near a lake in northern Japan, they find the literature club also came for a camp, and while they get to stay in a large resort-type building, the astronomy club members are left to stay in a run down place. Mihoshi cleans it up and the members take a nap so as to wake up at night for stargazing. Saku and Hime are still concerned about what happened earlier, but they later clear it up between each other. The astronomy club spends the entire night stargazing and watch the sunrise.
5	"The Star of Words"; Transliteration: "Kotoba no Hoshi" (Japanese: 言葉の星)	August 4, 2009
Fumie finds the astronomy club members sleeping in the same room after they collapsed from exhaustion the previous night, and she forbids them from taking part in club activities for one night. The next day, three guys hit on Hime and two literature club members, and Fumie tries to interfere at first, but when Saku goes to help, he trips and falls into the guy's fist. Mihoshi and Hime manage to take care of the three guys, and Saku is taken inside and cared for, though he only has a small cut. While the other astronomy club members are taking a bath, Fumie talks with Saku about the astronomy club's activities and they decide to invite the literature club members the next night to show them what the astronomy club does at night. Hime takes care of pointing out several constellations and the Milky Way, and everyone enjoys the night of stargazing.
6	"Pleased to Meet You"; Transliteration: "Yoroshiku" (Japanese: よろしく)	August 11, 2009
The new semester starts and on the bus to school Saku notices a tall man also getting off at the school. During the welcome back ceremony, the man that Saku saw earlier is introduced as a new teacher named Nozomu Sōma who is in charge of Saku's class and world history. Mihoshi calls him "Sō-nii" in front of everyone and rumors abound as to what their relationship is. Later, Sōma becomes the astronomy club's adviser and he explains to the others how Mihoshi's father was his professor at college and also the club adviser for their astronomy club. Sōma wants the club to do a planetarium for the upcoming cultural festival and they get in the top three in a popularity contest in exhibits, the club will get more funding. Saku becomes annoyed at Mihoshi's and Sōma's relationship and is approached by Fumie to help with the literature club.
7	"The Moon and Sweet Osmanthus"; Transliteration: "Tsuki to Kinmokusei" (Japanese: 月とキンモクセイ)	August 18, 2009
Despite initially going to refuse, Saku ends up agreeing to help the literature club. Mihoshi acts cheerful without him there, but is still troubled by his absence. Meanwhile, the astronomy club has their hands full with making the planetarium. Mihoshi suddenly hugs Saku one day after school and rumors spread after some athletic club members see them together with Sōma. Fumie becomes concerned that Saku has been helping the literature club too much and that he may be concerned about the rumors regarding him, Mihoshi and Sōma. Hime gives Saku a journal she compiled about the planetarium's construction. Saku feels re-energized about the astronomy club and goes back to help.
8	"Illuminated Ground"; Transliteration: "Irumineito Guraundo" (Japanese: イルミネイトグラウンド)	August 25, 2009
The cultural festival begins, though initially no one is coming to see the planetarium. After Haruko from the city planetarium arrives, she helps to bring in the people and the planetarium is well received by viewers for the rest of the day. Mihoshi thanks Saku for everything he has done for the club and is thankful that she has not caused him any trouble while he was helping the literature club. After the festival, the club members are distraught at the thought of dismantling the planetarium, but eventually take it down. The astronomy club was not able to win any prizes for the festival and thus still do not have enough money to even buy a telescope. Sayo takes the club to her family's Buddhist temple and perform a small moon festival. The astronomy club receives a video letter from the president of the astronomy club of Nogishiro High School in the same prefecture as Sōei High School inviting the club to the Autumn Stargazing Conference of the Prefectural High School Astronomy Network.
9	"High School Astronomy Network"; Transliteration: "Kōkō Tenmon Nettowāku" (Japanese: 高校天文ネットワーク)	September 1, 2009
Mihoshi and the other members are excited about the Autumn Stargazing Conference, and are surprised at the size of Nogishiro High School along with the number of members in their astronomy club. After the sun sets, everyone splits into groups and the process is explained by Nogishiro's astronomy club president Ayumi Ōmi; each group is free to stargaze until the moon sets, upon which each group will begin counting visible stars in a patch of sky to measure the overall brightness of the sky. Ayumi asks Saku to help on patrol around the school and they come across Hime and a second-year named Musa after she overreacts and thought he was trying to assault her. Afterwards, everyone goes back to the roof now that the moon has set, and Ayumi confesses to Saku that her astronomy club actually only has nine members in it and mostly everyone else is from other clubs. Takeyasu Roma does a narration of the autumn sky myth which everyone loves. Ayumi later confronts Roma and reminds him that they were once members of the same astronomy club at Goshima Science Museum.
10	"Together"; Transliteration: "Issho ni" (Japanese: いっしょに)	September 8, 2009
After overhearing Mihoshi and Sōma about plans together on the weekend, Saku, Hime and Edogawa follow them around town to find out what is going on, and initially they are out on a date. They eventually follow them to the grave site of Mihoshi's father who died in a car accident and everyone pays their respects. Saku, Hime and Edogawa feel awkward around Mihoshi after this. Fumie tries to give Saku a bookmark souvenir from her school trip to Hokkaido, but her glasses are broken after Saku protects her from a stray baseball. Saku offers to walk her home, and on the way they run into two members of the literature club who take her the rest of the way. Saku gets Fumie's help to set up a shooting star viewing event at school for Mihoshi, who is overcome with emotion over it.
11	"That's Like White Snow"; Transliteration: "Sore wa Shiroi Yuki no Yō ni" (Japanese: それは白い雪のように)	September 15, 2009
Saku's astronomy club participates in a winter stargazing camp with the girl from Takami Girls' School, who also participated in the Autumn Stargazing Conference. Saku, Edogawa and especially Hime do not dress warm enough, and while Saku and Edogawa brought more warmer clothes, Hime cannot dress in layers with the extra clothes she brought. After spending the first day freezing, Hime goes out at night to go to a local convenience store, but it is already closed by the time she gets there and a blizzard is blowing in. Hime tries to get back to the cabin, but quickly gets lost. The others notice she is gone, and also suspect Mihoshi went out to search for her. With Hime close to freezing to death, Mihoshi finds her and the two wait out the blizzard in a small snow cave. They find they were not far from the cabin and while they are scolded for what they did, everyone is relieved to have them back safely.
12	"Starry Sky Loop"; Transliteration: "Hoshizora Rūpu" (Japanese: 星空ループ)	September 22, 2009
The astronomy club members wake up late the next morning and first spend some time warming up in the outdoor baths. Ayumi Ōmi notices Roma stressing over studying for university entrance exams, and takes him to buy a study book and then have dinner at a fancy restaurant. The astronomy club members wait until the moon sets on the third night and spend their final night in the mountains stargazing and taking photos. The members use some eyepieces Mihoshi brought to find Saturn, which is an entrancing sight for everyone. The following spring, Mihoshi has succeeded as club president after Roma graduated and entered into university with Ayumi. Everyone puts in more effort this year for recruiting members, since they are now one member short, and are again in danger of getting disbanded.
