= List of Yumeiro Patissiere episodes =

The cover of the first DVD compilation released by Studio Pierrot featuring Team Ichigo and their Sweets Spirits: Ichigo (center), Vanilla (top left), Kashino, Chocolat (both top right), Café, Hanabusa (both bottom left), Caramel and Andō (both bottom right).

Yumeiro Patissiere is a Japanese anime television series based the manga of the same name written and illustrated by Natsumi Matsumoto. The series is produced by Studio Pierrot and directed by Ko Suzuki. It focuses on 14-year-old Ichigo Amano who dreams of becoming a pastry chef. She attends St. Marie Academy to follow her grandmother's footsteps while meeting the sweet spirits and some boys.

Two pieces of theme music have been used for the series thus far. The opening music piece is "Yume ni Ēru! Patishiēru" (夢にエール！パティシエール♪, Yell for the Dream! Patissiere) by Mayumi Gojō, and the ending theme is "Ichigo no Mirakurūru" (いちごのミラクルール, Ichigo's Miracle) by Yukina Sugihara. The CD single for the two was released by the Columbia Music Entertainment on January 20, 2010, in a regular and limited edition. The limited edition comes with extra charms and costs ¥1,365, but is otherwise the same as the regular edition, which costs ¥1,050. A soundtrack for the series was released on April 21, 2010, titled Yumeiro Patissiere: Sparkling Music (夢色パティシエール きらきら☆ミュージック, Yumeiro Patishiēru: Kira-kira Myūjikku).

Yumeiro Patissiere was available for streaming with English subtitles on Crunchyroll. This season contains 50 episodes with a second season premiering October 3, 2010, under the name Yumeiro Patisserie SP Professional. The first DVD volume for the anime was released March 3, 2010.

== Yumeiro Patissiere ==
No.	Title	Original air date
1	"I'm Going to Be a Pâtissière!"; Transliteration: "Atashi, Patishiēru ni Naru!" (Japanese: あたし、パティシエールになる！)	October 4, 2009
Ichigo Amano, a middle school student without particular talent, meets a pâtissier named Henri Lucas. Realizing that she has incredible palate at a Sweets Festival, Lucas asks her to enroll at a baking school called St. Marie Academy.
2	"The Legendary Sweets Spirits?"; Transliteration: "Densetsu no Suītsu Seirei (Supirittsu)?" (Japanese: 伝説のスイーツ精霊(スピリッツ)？)	October 11, 2009
Ichigo transfers to St. Marie Academy and is overwhelmed by the school. She encounters three boys known as Sweets Princes on the way to class, with each one of them being a talented pâtissier. Ichigo is then placed in Group A with them despite being a beginner, leading to jealousy and surprise among her other classmates.
3	"The Rose Sweets Prince"; Transliteration: "Bara no Suītsu Ōji" (Japanese: バラのスイーツ王子)	October 18, 2009
Ichigo has a hard time with the extreme course load at St. Marie's Academy and starts to get homesick. She is cheered up by Hanabusa, one of the boys in her group.
4	"I Hate These Stupid Cakes!"; Transliteration: "Kēki Nanka Daikirai da!" (Japanese: ケーキなんか大嫌いだ！)	October 25, 2009
There is a special salon at St. Marie Academy managed by the High School student council called Salon de Marie. Ichigo would give anything to work there, but because she's in middle school, her chances are slim. Andō asks her to come with him to his family's Japanese confectionery to help get her mind off things. She finds out that the eldest out of Andō's four younger siblings, Ichita, dislikes cakes, so she decides to find out why.
5	"Angel? Devil? Spirits??"; Transliteration: "Tenshi? Akuma? Supirittsu??" (Japanese: 天使？悪魔？精霊？？)	November 1, 2009
Kashino is extremely skilled with chocolate. With a chocolate test coming up, Ichigo decides to make a chocolate cake that will blow him away.
6	"Birthday Party at Chirping Preschool"; Transliteration: "Piyopiyo Yōchien no Otanjōkai" (Japanese: ぴよぴよ幼稚園のお誕生会)	November 8, 2009
Ichigo finds all three of the Sweets Princes also have accompanying Sweets Spirits. On a trip to a local preschool, Ichigo meets a little girl named Ringo who seems to be having trouble making friends, and promises her that she will make a cake that helps her to make friends with everyone else in the class.
7	"Friendship Birthday Cake"; Transliteration: "Nakayoshi Tanjōbi (Bāsudē) Kēki" (Japanese: 仲良し誕生日(バースデー)ケーキ)	November 15, 2009
Group B stole the cake Ichigo designed to get her embarrassed because she is with the Sweets Princes. With little time to spare, Group A must design a new cake to be presented to Ringo for her birthday.
8	"The Genius, the Archrival, and the Natural?"; Transliteration: "Tensai to Tenteki to Tennen?" (Japanese: 天才と天敵と天然？)	November 22, 2009
Ichigo's roommate and friend, Rumi, goes home and leaves her alone. Group B invited her to gather walnuts and she is intentionally misled by them. Fortunately, the High School student council president, Mari Tennouji, rescues Ichigo. Later, Ichigo learns about the Cake Grand Prix, a competition held at St. Marie's Academy where winners get to go to Paris to study. Ichigo and the rest of Group A decide to team up for the competition, but a girl named Miya shows up and claims that she will be the one to work with Group A, leading a showdown between her and Ichigo.
9	"The Fated Pudding Showdown!!"; Transliteration: "Unmei no Purin Taiketsu!!" (Japanese: 運命のプリン対決！！)	November 29, 2009
With the help of Caramel and Vanilla, Ichigo stays up all night the night before her showdown with the Heiress to practice making pudding. She ends up winning due to a few factors and finds out that Mari Tennōji also has a Sweets Spirit named Honey. Group A is upset at Ichigo's attitude towards her win, and when Vanilla tries to explain, Ichigo does not listen. Vanilla gets upset and claims that she will no longer be her partner.
10	"Strawberry Tart of Memories"; Transliteration: "Omoide no Ichigo Taruto" (Japanese: 思いでのイチゴタルト)	December 6, 2009
Regretting her previous actions, Ichigo returns home without telling anyone. Her family greets her happily, not having known that Ichigo ran away because she told them that she was on an early Winter break. However, Ichigo quickly tells them the truth after her mom hangs up the phone and tells them her plans to transfer from St. Marie's Academy. The next day, Ichigo and her family visit her deceased grandmother's patisserie, now run by her uncle. She and her sister help their uncle make sweets. After discovering that Vanilla followed her and remembering the happiness her grandmother's sweets brought her, Ichigo decides to return to St. Marie. As her uncle gives her grandmother's recipe notebook, Ichigo returns to the Sweets Princes who are waiting for her to apologize for what they said to her.
11	"The Princes' Madeleine of Friendship"; Transliteration: "Ōji-tachi no Yūjō Madorēnu" (Japanese: 王子達の友情マドレーヌ)	December 13, 2009
The Sweets Princes tells Ichigo about how they first met, got their Sweets Spirits, and became friends over each other's madeleine.
12	"The Seven Year Merry Christmas"; Transliteration: "Shichi-nenme no Merī Kurisumasu" (Japanese: 七年目のメリークリスマス)	December 20, 2009
At St. Marie's annual Christmas cake charity event, Ichigo encounters a depressed customer. When Team Ichigo hears his story about his lost love seven years prior, they decide to wish him a Merry Christmas.
13	"Happy Sweets Dream"; Transliteration: "Happī Suītsu Dorīmu" (Japanese: ハッピー・スイーツ・ドリーム)	December 27, 2009
As her friends return home for New Year's break, Ichigo stays behind at school to practice. When Vanilla asks her to visit the Sweets Kingdom, she agrees happily. While Vanilla and the rest of the court Sweets Spirits prepare for their annual New Year's Festival, Ichigo encounters a group of bandits who are known as The Jerks.
14	"The Cake Grand Prix Begins!"; Transliteration: "Kaimaku! Kēki Guran Puri" (Japanese: 開幕！ケーキグランプリ)	January 10, 2010
The Sweets Princes give Ichigo a crash course to help her through the preliminary section of the Cake Grand Prix. Due to the fact that too many middle school teams entered this year, they find out at the beginning of the exam that there is a new individual section. If Ichigo fails, the whole of Group A will fail.
15	"Rose Water of Memories"; Transliteration: "Omoide no Rōzu Wōtā" (Japanese: 想い出のローズウォーター)	January 17, 2010
In the first round of the Cake Grand Prix, Group A faces a group of third-year schoolboys and a girl who have their sweets featured in Salon de Marie. Ichigo, Kashino, and Andō easily can come up with their pound cakes. When Hanabusa cannot seem to get his rose water pound cake to come out, he gets frustrated and runs away, but Ichigo follows him. Because she is a girl, Hanabusa explains to her that the rose water was a gift from his deceased father and how important it was to him.
16	"Sweet Rose Memory"; Transliteration: "Suīto Rōzu Memorī" (Japanese: スイートローズメモリー)	January 24, 2010
Hanabusa decides to abandon his rose water pound cake and throws the bottle into a pond angrily, but Ichigo jumps in after it. After noticing that the pond water left a smell on Ichigo and Kashino, who jumped in after her, Hanabusa has an idea for his cake. The next day at the Cake Grand Prix match, Team Ichigo shows the audience that they had to change the recipes so that they would match Hanabusa's rose water cake. Because Team Ichigo made cakes that all accented one another instead of overpowering each other, Team Ichigo wins the match. During a teatime celebrating their win, Kashino and Andō get jealous of Hanabusa kissing Ichigo, but she dismisses it as "nothing more than a greeting".
17	"Pâtissière Showdown"; Transliteration: "Patishiēru Taiketsu" (Japanese: パティシエール対決)	January 31, 2010
One of Ichigo's classmates, Hayami, plans to exclude her from the Sweets Princes' group due to her lack of skills. Things go wrong as Ichigo finds out that Hayami was originally in Group C, but dropped to Group F after her sickness and fever during the final exam. Even worse, Hayami is currently planning to quit St. Marie's Academy.
18	"The Bitter Circumstance of the Kashino Household"; Transliteration: "Kashino ke no Bitā na Jijō" (Japanese: 樫野家のビターな事情)	February 7, 2010
Ichigo falls down the stairs and is taken to the local hospital by the Sweets Princes, except Kashino who does not seem to want to go into the building. She notices that all the doctors are named Kashino at the hospital and the group finds out that Kashino's family owns the hospital. When Kashino's sister shows up tells that Kashino is kidnapped, Team Ichigo and the Sweets Spirits must find him.
19	"Happy Valentine"; Transliteration: "Happī Barentain" (Japanese: ハッピー・バレンタイン)	February 14, 2010
Ichigo goes shopping with Rumi for Valentine's chocolate when they run into the Heiress, who challenged Ichigo to a chocolate-making duel that will occur on Valentine's Day at the party sponsored by the Heiress' father. During the party, they end up having a tie and Ichigo danced with the Sweets Princes.
20	"A Powerful Foe!? The Transfer Student from Paris"; Transliteration: "Kyōteki!? Pari kara no Tenkōsei" (Japanese: 強敵！？パリからの転校生)	February 21, 2010
Team Ichigo faces only first-year group in the quarterfinals of the middle school round of the Cake Grand Prix, whose leader, Lemon, is a transfer student from the original campus in Paris.
21	"Friendship Maccha Gâteau Chocolat"; Transliteration: "Yūjō no Maccha Gatō Shokora" (Japanese: 友情の抹茶ガトーショコラ)	February 28, 2010
The rematch for Team Ichigo and Lemon's quarterfinal match is scheduled with the theme being friendship, but Andō ran away. Ichigo, Kashino, and Hanabusa follow him home to make him change his mind about quitting St. Marie's Academy.
22	"The Promised Perfect Sweets"; Transliteration: "Yakusoku no Zeppin Suītsu" (Japanese: 約束の絶品スイーツ)	March 7, 2010
Vanilla knocks over Ichigo's alarm clock, causing her to oversleep and trip down the stairs. The dorm mistress gives her baumkuchen she made as Ichigo skipped breakfast. When she sees the dorm mistress arguing with her husband who is also the head of the boys' dorm, she decides to meddle.
23	"Strawberry Illusion?"; Transliteration: "Ichigo Iryūjon?" (Japanese: いちご・イリュージョン？)	March 14, 2010
Ichita wants to watch circus group from France who is coming to perform near Andō's home. Team Ichigo goes to see the circus' performance, where Ichita spots a blonde girl performing. After the show, Ichigo and Ichita get separated from the group and meets Amelie, the blonde girl Ichita previously spotted named. Ichita gives Amelie some cookies and invites them to her mobile home to pay for the delicious cookies. When they arrived at their mobile house, Amelie's mother offered them to eat curry and spinach salad, which does not impress Amelie and Ichita. Ichigo makes a dessert containing both spinach and carrot, only for neither Ichita nor Ameli to enjoy it. Back at the academy, Ichigo works hard to make a spinach and carrot cake, but cannot get it right without Andō's help. After Ichita approves the taste as he tries it, they rush to get it to Amelie, who is moving with the circus.
24	"The Chocolate Cake of Love Battle!"; Transliteration: "Ai no Choko Kēki Taiketsu!" (Japanese: 愛のチョコケーキ対決！)	March 21, 2010
Teams participating in the semi-finals of the Cake Grand Prix are required to make a chocolate cake using the theme of love. Faching Team Koshiro, Team Ichigo bets that if they lose, Kashino has to join their team. The usual, confident chocolatier, Kashino, dislikes the theme and leaves the decision of the cake type to make one for his teammates. When they decide on a Sacher Torte, Ichigo pulls an all-nighter to think of a design for the cake which creates love.
25	"Goodbye, Kashino"; Transliteration: "Sayonara Kashino" (Japanese: さよなら樫野)	March 28, 2010
Team Ichigo and Team Koshiro advanced to Semi-Finals, with the former being confident because the battle is based on chocolate. Both teams are about to start when Ichigo finds out that she showed her design to the opposing team and they are using a similar design. The judges know that one team has cheated by the talk they are having during the competition. Although Team Ichigo knows this, they do not know whose design it really was or who stole the design.
26	"Nightmare of the Heiress Empire!"; Transliteration: "Ojō Teikoku no Akumu!" (Japanese: オジョー帝国の悪夢！)	April 4, 2010
Team Ichigo has lost to Team Koshiro and Kashino must join the latter. Kashino is participating in Team Koshiro's practicals without reluctance, but Hanabusa and Andō believe that he will return, leaving a hesitant Ichigo without choice but to continue practicing for their next match in the tournament's third place playoff.
27	"Surprise Sweets"; Transliteration: "Sapuraizu Suītsu" (Japanese: サプライズスイーツ)	April 11, 2010
An examiner arrives from the Sweets Kingdom and tells the Sweet Spirits that they have not sent enough Sweets Cards to the Queen, thus they must take a supplementary exam. The examiner told them the spirits are not allowed to return to the human world unless they pass. Meanwhile, Chocolat feels lonely when she sees that the other spirits being close to their partners and leaves for the Sweets Kingdom without telling Kashino.
28	"Ichigo, Natsume, and the Princes"; Transliteration: "Ichigo to Natsume to Ōjisama" (Japanese: イチゴとなつめと王子さま)	April 18, 2010
Team Ichigo decides to split up to train individually for the weekend. Ichigo decides to go to her uncle's shop, but returns home for the weekend first when she finds her parents upset over the fact that Natsume is thinking of giving up piano. Ichigo tries to cheer her up with the same strawberry tart that her grandmother made for her when she was young. The Sweets Princes show up after their plans all fall through and make a special cake for Natsume as well.
29	"The Mille Crêpe of Bonds"; Transliteration: "Kizuna no Miru Kurēpu" (Japanese: 絆のミルクレープ)	April 25, 2010
After Team Ichigo is caught slacking in class, their teacher, Ameya-sensei, suggests them not to think about the competition until the day-off. She makes the whole class do the most basic lessons until the day of the competition, making Team Ichigo wonder if there is a point.
30	"Miracle Cheesecake"; Transliteration: "Mirakuru Chīzukēki" (Japanese: ミラクルチーズケーキ)	May 2, 2010
Team Ichigo goes to a ranch to study on the ingredients that were used to make a cheesecake. At the same time, Caramel is having trouble writing a report to the Sweets Kingdom. While playing with the farm animals, Caramel is chased by a calf and gets lost. The Vanilla, Chocolat and Café chase after Caramel.
31	"The Princess and The Heiress"; Transliteration: "Hime to Ojō" (Japanese: 姫とオジョー)	May 9, 2010
The theme for the first round of the main tournament of the Cake Grand Prix is "elegance" and Team Ichigo is up against Team Tachibana, a group of girls known as the "Country Girls" for only using organic and non-artificial ingredients. Team Ichigo decides to base their cake on the Heian period because it was an era which exemplifies the idea of elegance and win because Team Tachibana's creation falls apart. Meanwhile, Team Tennōji competes with Team Koshiro, with the latter losing the battle.
32	"Tropical Paradise!"; Transliteration: "Toropikaru Paradaisu!" (Japanese: トロピカル・パラダイス！)	May 16, 2010
Team Ichigo goes to a local sweets festival to research for the next round of the Cake Grand Prix. Ichigo runs off looking at all sweets as the boys are left to chase after her. While waiting with Kashino, Ichigo meets a girl named Natsuki, who offers to take them to one of the local shops. The shop serves fresh fruit sweets, which later turns out to be the theme for the Grand Prix. Team Ichigo is up against Team Natsuki, the same girls who served them fruit at the sweets festival.
33	"Strawberry Panic!"; Transliteration: "Sutoroberī Panikku!" (Japanese: ストロベリー・パニック！)	May 23, 2010
Worried after trying Team Natsuki's sweets, Kashino tells Ichigo to calm down and just make sweets that impress people. Ichigo, Kashino, Vanilla, and Chocolat are walking around the school's fruit garden and come upon white strawberries, which gives Ichigo an idea that allows them to beat Team Natsuki to go to the finals by a point.
34	"The Strongest Pair in History!"; Transliteration: "Shijō Saikyō no Konbi!" (Japanese: 史上最強のコンビ！)	May 30, 2010
Marron comes from the Sweets Kingdom to find a partner. The Sweets Spirits show her to the Heiress' classroom as they think Marron and Miya are similar. Marron is not impressed so she tries to force the Sweets Princes into the job, only for all of them to reject. She sees Tennōji and almost asks her, but sees Tennōji already has Honey. When Marron almost leaves to Paris from the cooking room oven, Miya barges in all of a sudden. Marron becomes interested in her and they become partners.
35	"Welcome, Henri-sensei"; Transliteration: "Yōkoso, Anri-sensei" (Japanese: ようこそ、アンリ先生)	June 6, 2010
Ichigo is surprised to hear that Henri coming back, but loses concentration in class and cancels practice troubling Kashino. The Sweets Princes cheer her up by eating the cake she made. Henri later reveals that he is one of the judges for the final round of the Cake Grand Prix.
36	"Night Before The Finals!"; Transliteration: "Kessen Zenya!" (Japanese: 決戦前夜！)	June 13, 2010
Team Ichigo is told that the theme for the finals will not be revealed until the actual day, so they begin training using high school textbooks to combat Team Tennouji's high level cakes. Upon being told by Tennōji that Ichigo will never catch up to her in the time she has before the finals, Ichigo tries to figure out what she means by that. After a conversation with Natsume, Ichigo decides to train herself in the basics as she lacks experience with them. Team Ichigo's sweets spirits decide to bake sweets to cheer up their partners.
37	"Unwavering Feelings"; Transliteration: "Yuzurenai Omoi" (Japanese: ゆずれない想い)	June 20, 2010
Each team has a day to come up something before making the actual piece on the dream-themed second day final. Team Ichigo initially had trouble deciding what to make, but soon came up with an idea. While Ichigo is thinking up what to put in her Petite Gateaux, she runs into Tennōji. Hearing Ichigo's story about her first meeting with Henri and about her grandmother, Tennōji reveals her past and her relationship with Henri and makes her battle declaration.
38	"The Closed Path"; Transliteration: "Tozasareta Michi" (Japanese: 閉ざされた道)	June 27, 2010
With the final showdown of the grand prix coming, Kashino is responsible for the toughest job on the team and passes out. Team Tennōji ends up winning the Grand Prix by one point, but Henri announces that because Team Ichigo did perfectly, they are also being invited to go to Paris for the World Grand Prix.
39	"The Vanished Recipe"; Transliteration: "Kieta Reshipi" (Japanese: 消えたレシピ)	July 4, 2010
Team Ichigo returns to their respective homes in order to prepare for the World Cake Grand Prix in Paris, but Kashino's family, who is against him becoming a patissier, rejects to sign the form. Meanwhile, Ichigo is also having trouble with her father who is stubborn about her not going to Paris. The old dirty spoon that Ichigo was given to when she went to the Sweets Kingdom shines, and Ichigo and Vanilla uses it to unlock her grandmother's notebook to read the recipes she made, only to find out that the strawberry tart recipe has been completely erased.
40	"Bonjour! Paris"; Transliteration: "Bonjūru! Pari" (Japanese: ボンジュール！パリ)	July 11, 2010
Traveling around Paris, Ichigo gets lost on the subway and meets Ricardo, an international student from Italy who is a representative of the team from the main branch. When she meets up with Kashino and the others, the Sweets Princes got envious as Ricardo flirts with her. At the Cake Grand Prix welcoming party, Team Ichigo discovers that Lemon is a member of Ricardo's Team, while the sweets spirits have to do an obstacle course to determine the drawings for the matches. The Heiress returns as Team Ichigo and Team Ricardo will face each other in the final.
41	"The Fourth Sweets Prince?"; Transliteration: "Yō-nin-me no Suītsu Ōji?" (Japanese: 4人目のスイーツ王子？)	July 18, 2010
The judges have announced the next food wagon-themed match, but Team Ichigo is in trouble as their oven breaks. Hearing the explosion, the landlady gives them a heavy-duty vacuum cleaner and tells the story about her gelateria she shut down three years ago. Furthermore, while preparing for the match, Team Ichigo decides to make gelato for the competition and meets Ricardo in town. As the three Sweets Princes continue to give Ricardo that jealous look, he announces that Ichigo will become his girlfriend if his team wins the match.
42	"Gelato of Happiness"; Transliteration: "Shiawase no Jerāto" (Japanese: 幸せのジェラート)	July 25, 2010
Team Ichigo go to their landlady's gelateria to practice making gelato. She tells that the group will never win the competition if they do not come up with a unique flavor for their gelato, which Team Ichigo eventually did by thinking for four flavors. On the day of the competition, Team Ichigo beat Team Ricardo's doughnuts by one point while the other teams advance the semi-finals.
43	"Underneath the Orange Tree"; Transliteration: "Oranju no Ki no Shita de" (Japanese: オランジュの木の下で)	August 1, 2010
Team Ichigo decides to split into two groups and go to separate patisserie to train. Ichigo and Kashino go to a small three-star pâtisserie owned by Mr. Blanc, while Hanabusa and Andō go to a four-star hotel with a three-star patisserie. Hanabusa and Andō got into the kitchen quickly to make some sweets, but Ichigo and Kashino have to do menial tasks such as wiping the windows and gathering some ingredients. Upon witnessing Ichigo dancing under the orange tree, Blanc invites them to the kitchen, only to have them wash dishes. Despite the existence of an orange tree in Patisserie Blanc, there are no sweets that use oranges on the menu. This leaves Ichigo worried until she and Kashino decide to make tarte à l'orange to show their gratitude to Blanc on the last day of training. Blanc is surprised when he tastes it and begins to make orange sweets in his patisserie again.
44	"Chocolate Princess"; Transliteration: "Chokorēto Purinsesu" (Japanese: チョコレート・プリンセス)	August 8, 2010
Team Ichigo and Team Koshiro are invited to a ball on Mont Saint-Michel by an anonymous letter with the St. Marie Academy emblem on it. Henri's secretary appears and comes them to the ballroom in the Saint-Michel castle that happens to be the venue for the semi-finals, the theme of which is a dress made of chocolate. Team Ichigo decides to make a dress by basing the design with the fairytale Cinderella. Kashino, Hanabusa and Andō decide to make Ichigo the model, as they did not have the time to choose another. The ball starts and Ichigo is taken out by Henri, who says that he was afraid that Ichigo would be crushed.
45	"Bon Bon Chocolat de Tour"; Transliteration: "Bon Bon Chokora de Tsuā" (Japanese: ボンボンショコラ・デ・ツアー)	August 15, 2010
Team Ichigo and Koshiro were led around Europe by Henri-sensei's secretary. By the time they got to the last destination in Germany, Henri announced that the rematch of semi-finals would happen in the Swan Castle. Heiress claimed that if her team won, Kashino needs to marry her on the spot. Team Ichigo decided to use Ichigo's ideas from their tour around Europe and the chocolates bought by Kashino during their tour from various countries. Team Ichigo won and advances to the finals because Team Koshiro only used ingredients from Chateau Seika as the former team used ingredients from their tour around Europe.
46	"Grandma's Recipe"; Transliteration: "Obachan no Reshipi" (Japanese: お婆ちゃんのレシピ)	August 22, 2010
Back in Paris to prepare for the finals, Ichigo finds some scrumptious strawberries in the market and wishes she had her grandmother's strawberry tart recipe that vanished from her recipe book. Kashino finds another vanished recipe in a book he checked out from the library, in which the Sweets Spirits discover traces of magic dust they used. Going to Sweets Kingdom, Ichigo searches for the old woman Spirit who gave her the spoon, because she thinks she might be her grandmother's spirit.
47	"The Paris Found in the Backyard"; Transliteration: "Uraniwa de Mitsuketa Pari" (Japanese: 裏庭で見つけたパリ)	September 5, 2010
Ichigo begins intensive training to create her own original Strawberry Tart recipe but has trouble with it. When Kashino tastes, he points out that the problem is with the strawberries and she realizes that she needs special strawberries with a unique taste like the ones her grandmother used. However, the strawberries are not available anymore, so Ichigo decides to use Heiress' help to look for them. Returning to Japan using the Sweets Kingdom toy train, Ichigo samples the Heiress' top-quality strawberries, only to still struggle find one to suit her tart. She returns to her grandmother's garden and finds the special patch of soil the latter used. Upon finding a few of her grandmother's strawberries, Marron tells her that those were called fraises de bois.
48	"It Can't Be, Henri-sensei!"; Transliteration: "Uso Desho! Henri-sensei" (Japanese: ウソでしょ！アンリ先生)	September 12, 2010
With Team Tennōji losing the semi-finals, Team Ichigo is left wondering what to make of it. Watching the DVD of the match recorded by Chateau Seika at Team François' request, this leaves them to be perplexed upon seeing Mari giving a completely sloppy performance. As Lemon tells the Sweets Princes about Team François' superior skills, Mari reveals what happened before semi-finals. Henri-sensei appears and reveals his true colors while sneering at Mari for her feelings towards him. Henri states that romance is not necessary in accomplishing as a top patissiere, even going as far to look down on Ichigo's skills for the first time. Ichigo declares to Henri that they will beat Team François. Ichigo returns to Paris and starts to practice for the finals with her team.
49	"The Finals at The Palace of Versailles!"; Transliteration: "Kessen! Berusaiyu Kyuuden" (Japanese: 決戦！ベルサイユ宮殿)	September 19, 2010
During the World Cake Grand Prix finals, Team Ichigo and François clash in a three-hour team battle with two subjects and themes: an entremet made of chocolate and plated desserts which combines hot and cold sensation. As the match ended in a draw, the judges decides to make another match on the same day using batter as the subject which is an individual match. Andō clashes with Katie, Hanabusa matches against Isabella, Kashino battles against Dominique and the team leaders battles each other.
50	"Strawberry Tart of Dreams"; Transliteration: "Yume no Ichigo Taruto" (Japanese: 夢のいちごタルト)	September 26, 2010
Another rematch is decided with the next battle ending in a draw as well; each team has to choose one representative. Despite her protests, Ichigo chosen as the representative of her team with François being chosen as the representative. François made her specialty, Dijonaise au Chocolate as expected. Through Ichigo's strawberry tart, which Vanilla named as Sourire de l'Ange, Team Ichigo attained victory. Ichigo discovers that Henri is playing the bad guy part to push her determination to surprise her grandmother's tart. Holding hands together at the end, Ichigo and Kashino confess and promise to progress during Professional.
OVA	"Heart-Racing Tropical Island!"; Transliteration: "Mune Kyun Toropikaru Airando!" (Japanese: 胸キュントロピカルアイランド！)	July 30, 2010; October 2, 2010 (DVD)

== Yumeiro Patissiere Professional ==
No. overall	No. in season	Title	Original air date
51	1	"Team Ichigo Breaks Up!"; Transliteration: "Kaisan! Chīmu Ichigo" (Japanese: 解散！チームいちご)	October 3, 2010
Two years after returning to Japan from studying abroad in Paris, Ichigo discovers at Saint Marie's Academy that none of her teammates are around. In Salon de Marie, Ichigo meets Johnny McBeal, the final member of her team. While praying to the Queen Sweets Spirit statue, Ichigo meets Mari who reveals that she is living in New York working on Henri's new "project". Ichigo receives a letter from Henri, telling her to meet him at a location to discuss something. When she goes to the meeting place, she finds that Johnny, Kashino, and Lemon all got the same letter. Henri tells them he wants them to run sweets shops on the main street of his new project, "Marie's Garden" named after his grandmother.
52	2	"Johnny and Maize"; Transliteration: "Jonī to Meizu" (Japanese: ジョニーとメイズ)	October 10, 2010
Before Team Ichigo starts to work, Johnny's Sweets Spirit, Maize, freaks out on them due to etiquette. Kashino, Lemon, and Ichigo also discover that Koshiro and Johnny are cousins. Henri announces that the first shops on street one are going to open within a few weeks, and the owners are from different countries allowing different types of sweets to surface. Much to their surprise, the Japanese sweets shop is managed by Andō with Kana and her friends being waitresses. The shops will be ranked on popularity and sales, with the least well-received shop scheduled to be closed and a new shop will replace it. The four teams decide to host a contest to decide on the group leader.
53	3	"New Team Ichigo?"; Transliteration: "Shin Chīmu Ichigo?" (Japanese: 新チームいちご？)	October 17, 2010
Kashino still does not understand that Johnny might steal Ichigo away from him. When the sweets shop is facing bankruptcy, Lemon and Johnny want to get funds from Miya, to which Kashino disagreed. As they enter Andō's shop, Manager Sully turns up and told him that Andō needs to close it if he does not get enough sales.
54	4	"Chance Loss and Disposal Loss"; Transliteration: "Chansu Rosu to Haiki Rosu" (Japanese: チャンスロスと廃棄ロス)	October 24, 2010
With Andō's shop on the verge of closure, he catches a fever which leaves Caramel worried about him. Waking up upon collapsing, Andō finds all his friends and his grandfather come to visit him. Johnny, Kashino, and his grandfather scold him and point out his mistakes for pushing himself to hard and try to so everything alone. Caramel also gives out her advice to Andō that he has to rely on other people more.
55	5	"The Spirits Expedition to the Unexplored!"; Transliteration: "Supirittsu de Hikyō Tanken!" (Japanese: スピリッツで秘境探険！)	October 31, 2010
The Sweets Spirits receive a letter from Andy back in the Sweets Kingdom asking for their help with a project. Team Ichigo go to the Sweets Kingdom with the Sweets Spirits for a break and to help the Jerks.
56	6	"Lost In the Baum Forest"; Transliteration: "Baumu no Mori de Mayotte" (Japanese: バウムの森で迷って)	November 7, 2010
Team Ichigo passes easily through the Powder Desert and Milky Lake until they lost in the Baum Forest. With garbage around, Master of the Forest believes that Kasshi and the Jerks have done it, leaving them in a cell. Team Ichigo needs to think of a way to save her friends and find the culprit before the Jerks have to take the exam.
57	7	"The Treasure Found On The Journey"; Transliteration: "Tabi de Kitsu keta Takaramono" (Japanese: 旅で見つけた宝物)	November 14, 2010
While all patissiers are learning about Egg Home, the Jerks hope for their sweets to be the best during the patisserie exams.
58	8	"Lonely Heart"; Transliteration: "Ronrī Hāto" (Japanese: ロンリー・ハート)	November 21, 2010
Ichigo and the others are called by Henri to go to New York to help Mari with her shop, as her business is doing poorly. When they arrive they end up meeting Rick and he tells them the problem, but before they can help Mari suggests that they go sightseeing.
59	9	"Step Up"; Transliteration: "Suteppu Appu" (Japanese: ステップ・アップ)	November 28, 2010
In New York, Ichigo and her friends try to help Mari with Pâtisserie La Liberté's business. At the end of the episode, Henri calls and said if they did not pass a specific goal, Mari cannot keep the shop.
60	10	"My Sweet Home"; Transliteration: "Mai Suīto Hōmu" (Japanese: マイ・スイート・ホーム)	December 5, 2010
The business of Pâtisserie La Liberté has increased after Team Ichigo made the coupon plan. Hanabusa thought that they should change the concept of the store and the others ask Mari to take a day-off. At the end of the episode, Henri-sensei called and said they have passed their goal.
61	11	"Stormy Night"; Transliteration: "Arashi no Yoru" (Japanese: 嵐の夜)	December 12, 2010
Returning from New York, Miya and Johnny challenge Team Ichigo. If they lose, Kashino must marry Miya and Ichigo has to date Johnny until they get married. Hanabusa and Andou help them set up their shop and create some new sweets before pointing out Kashino's love towards Ichigo.
62	12	"Chilly Night"; Transliteration: "Tsumetai Yoru" (Japanese: 冷たい夜)	December 19, 2010
Team Ichigo opens their store as Miya and Johnny's shop called "Beautiful Night Castle" becomes a big hit.
63	13	"Holy Night"; Transliteration: "Hijiri naru Yoru" (Japanese: 聖なる夜)	December 26, 2010
Thanks to the help from their friends, Ichigo and the others are slowly catching up to Ōjō and Johnny despite the overwhelming difference of sales. A message is sent by Honey as Kashino's love for Ichigo is on the spotlight. On Christmas Eve, the battle will be decided by Christmas Cake. The battle results in a tie but Johnny admits that they actually lose. Walking on the frozen round, Kashino pushes Miya away, who falls on Johnny until Kashino and Ichigo kiss each other. After Ichigo receives a call from Henri, who has opened Marie's Garden in London, everyone goes to pursue their dreams.

== DVD volumes ==
The first season is released on DVD in Japan, with the first 13 volumes having been released in March 2010.

Yumeiro Patissiere DVD releases
Volume	Released	Discs	Episodes
1	March 3, 2010	1	1-3
2	April 7, 2010	1	4-6
3	May 8, 2010	1	7-10
4	June 3, 2010	1	11-14
5	July 7, 2010	1	15-18
6	August 4, 2010	1	19-22
7	August 29, 2010	1	23-26
8	October 6, 2010	1	27-30
9	November 3, 2010	1	31-34
10	December 3, 2010	1	35-38
11	January 7, 2011	1	39-42
12	February 3, 2011	1	43-46
13	TBA	1	47-50
