= List of The Podcats episodes =

The following is a list of episodes of the Okidoki Studio cartoon television series The Podcats, which premiered on September 7, 2009. The show aired on France 3, France Ô, TV3 and many more.

Seasons each have 26 episodes, bringing the total to 78 episodes.

== Episodes ==
=== Season 1: 2009–07 ===
1. Buzz
2. Emoticon
3. Manga
4. Backup
5. Bluetooth
6. Nac
7. Firewall
8. Bug
9. GPS
10. Bonus
11. Troll
12. Ping & lag
13. Boss
14. Overclocking
15. Lightsaber
16. Playback
17. Hub
18. Guitar Hero
19. Voice off
20. Sound effects
21. Tricks
22. Tank
23. Camper
24. Search engine
25. MP3 Downloads
26. Super power
27. Combo
28. Dragon
29. The chosen
30. Cheat code
31. Grimoire
32. Old sage
33. Paladin
34. Drop
35. Demo
36. Levels
37. Timer
38. Warpzone
39. Pilot
40. Mod
