= List of 07-Ghost episodes =

The episodes of 07-Ghost were created by Studio DEEN. Directed by Yoshihiro Takamoto, the anime premiered on Chiba TV on April 7, 2009. The series uses two pieces of theme music. "Aka no Kakera" by Yuuki Suzuki is the opening theme, while "Hitomi no Kotae" by Noria is the ending theme.

== Episode list ==
No.	Title	Original air date
1	"The Future of Painful Thoughts is" Transliteration: "Setsu naru Omoi no Yukusue wa" (Japanese: 切なる想いの行く末は)	April 7, 2009
Teito Klein is a young student at the Barsburg Military Academy in the same dorm with his best friend Mikage. They are getting ready for their graduation exam using their abilities, the Zaiphon. Teito sees a vision about a dark secret pertaining to his hidden past (which he is unable to remember) and attempts to assassinate Ayanami, the man who killed his father, but he is captured and sent to a cell. He plans to escape alone, however, when Mikage arrives at his cell to rescue him, he ends up escaping with the help of Mikage and manages to break free from the academy.
2	"Nostalgic Memories Accompany Pain"; Transliteration: "Natsukashiki Kioku wa Itami to Tomo ni" (Japanese: 懐かしき記憶は痛みと共に)	April 14, 2009
Three men are riding on hawkzile when Teito crashes into one of the men, Frau, and he is brought into the Church. Teito attempts to escape, only to be brought back into the church. The three men introduce themselves as Frau, Castor, and Labrador- all bishops of the Church, which lies in the 7th District of the Barsburg empire. They ask him his name, but say he does not need to when they see Teito is hesitant. Teito wonders why the bishops and sisters are all very kind to him. Teito wonders about the condition of Mikage, who had helped him escape from the Academy. Teito enters the Library, wishing to know more about his murky past and his connection to the Raggs Kingdom, but ends up finding one of Frau's porn magazines which Frau hid in the library. Instead, Castor tells him about the Raggs war. He decides to find out the truth about the Raggs Kingdom and his past. Meanwhile, back at the Academy, Mikage is questioned by Ayanami as to whether he helped Teito escape or not. When he refuses to answer, Ayanami gives him a choice: either to save his family, which he treasures, or to save Teito.
3	"My Innocent Child, Sleep Within The Light"; Transliteration: "Watashi no Mujaki na Kodomo, Hikari no Naka no Suimin" (Japanese: 私の無邪気な子供、光の中の睡眠)	April 21, 2009
Teito is about to leave the church when instead, he is brought to a place that seems to be the cafeteria by Frau. Though Teito begins to look for something else to eat when he sees that the meal of the day is Eye Stew. The sisters ask his name, but yet again, he hesitates. They say it's alright for him not to say his name. Later, Teito stumbles upon an old man who tells Teito he can grant his wish if he goes to the same spot at midnight. Teito decides to leave the Church and help Mikage. Teito then decides to run off by himself at night. Frau interrupts his thoughts, telling him that it might be his fate that he came to the Church. Frau and Teito fight using Zaiphon powers. During the fight, Teito reveals his name. The continue to fight, but Frau is too strong, gains the upper hand and punches Teito, making him fall unconscious. Castor realizes that Teito is a member of the Academy (as only those people have the ability to wield the Zaiphon). After waking up, Teito decides to go to the courtyard, where he sees the old man from before. Frau realizes that something is wrong. In the meantime, Mikage at the Academy is still unsure of which side to choose: either saving Teito or his family (namely his sister).
4	"To the Depths of the Earnest Prayer"; Transliteration: "Tada Hitasura naru Inori no Hate ni" (Japanese: ただひたすらなる祈りの果てに)	April 28, 2009
Teito talks with the old man, and tells him his wish to see Mikage. The old man places an odd symbol on Teito's neck while Teito has a vision that he saw Mikage, and runs toward him. The flower that Labrador gave him from before stops him, and he realizes that the Bishops are there in front of him. Frau begins to attack the old man, who turns out to be a "Kor". Frau brings out from his arm, a large scythe, and he is shocked that Teito can see it. The Bishops fight the man, and though Teito wants to help, Frau tells him he will only hurt the man's soul. Frau manages to release the Kor from the old man's soul and then gets rid of the symbol on Teito's chest. Teito asks Castor what a Kor is. Kor are creatures that tamper with men's desires- they grant the man's wish, but he or she is then put into a string of dark events in which the person is never satisfied with his or her wishes and eventually falls into darkness, becoming a host for the Kor. In the morning, Teito is greeted by the sisters, who want to do his laundry. Teito is running away, when he bumps into Frau, who throws his underwear up. Teito catches it, but falls into the fountain, where he meets Lazet, a mermaid. Back at the Academy, Mikage makes his final choice: he won't betray his best friend. An enraged Ayanami releases a surge of Zaiphon at Mikage.
5	"Hot Tears, Gently Fill His Heart..."; Transliteration: "Atsuki Namida, Yasashiku Kare no Kokoro o Mitashi..." (Japanese: 熱き涙、やさしく彼の心を満たし...)	May 5, 2009
The bishops wonder what Teito's wish was. Teito is still affected by the events from the previous episode and after offering to help out the sisters, wonders why everyone is so kind to him. Teito has a vision where he realizes that he is the heir to the Raggs Kingdom and The Eye of Mikhail. While walking to the gate of the Church, Teito is shocked to see Mikage walking towards him. Mikage decides to stay with Teito at the Church, and while they are talking in the garden, they are attacked by a Kor sent by Ayanami. Teito fights the Kor, but can not hurt it. Frau appears and cleanses the man's soul from the Kor. At night, Teito reveals to Mikage his connection with the Raggs Kingdom.
6	"The Path of Justice Leads to Light"; Transliteration: "Hikari ni Tsūzuru Tadashiki Michi wa" (Japanese: 光に通ずる正しき道は)	May 12, 2009
The Church has its annual bazaar, and Teito, Mikage, and the sisters visit the bishops' shops. Labrador has a candy flower shop which has always been popular, because it is healthy and delicious. Castor has a clothes shop, though the clothes were originally for his dolls. Frau has a meats shop. Teito and Mikage try out his meat, but don't find it very nice once they find out what it's made of. Teito feels like Mikage is hiding something from him. At the entrance of the Church, Mikage helps a girl who has the Kor marking. Before Mikage can take the girl to the bishops, the girl becomes a Kor and attacks him. Teito comes to Mikage's rescue, but when the Kor captures Mikage and is about to kill him, The Eye of Mikhail activates, blinding the Kor. Frau comes and defeats the Kor while Teito becomes unconscious. When Teito wakes up, he and Mikage talk while the bishops watch them.
7	"Does the Soul that was Devoured by the Wings, Dream of Its Beloved Child?"; Transliteration: "Tsubasa ni Kuwareta Tamashii wa Itoshii Waga Ko no Yume o Miru?" (Japanese: 翼に喰われた魂は愛しい我子の夢を見る?)	May 19, 2009
Mikage wonders whether or not he should leave the church, but is interrupted by Teito. As Teito and Mikage talk, Mikage is being watched by one of Castor's dolls. Mikage has a flashback of him and Teito when they were in the academy. Mikage notices a little boy watching him from behind a tree, but when he tries to talk to the boy, he runs off. The boy is caught stealing bread from a shop, but the bishops let him go. He tells Teito and Mikage his name is Tajio and tells them that his mom is dead and his dad went to go earn money. Meanwhile, the sisters put on a play for people who are visiting the church, but Tajio thinks its real and interrupts the play until Mikage comes to take him away. Tajio's dad comes to take him home, but the dad is revealed to be a Kor. Teito and Mikage run to save Tajio, and when Teito and Tajio are attacked, The Eye of Mikhail activates but then stops. Frau arrives and defeats the Kor, and Tajio and his dad go home.
8	"Half of His Soul Arouses a Sad Awakening"; Transliteration: "Hanbun dake no Tamashii ga Kanashiki Mezame o Yobiokosu" (Japanese: 半分だけの魂が悲しき目覚めを呼び起こす)	May 26, 2009
As Teito and Mikage talk, Labrador predicts that the "storm" will come very soon, and right now is the "calm". Mikage suddenly feels something inside of himself awaken, and as one last favor...asks Teito to kill him. Mikage begins to scream in pain. As his last words, Mikage tells Teito that he loves him and that he's always considered Teito to be just as important as his family. Ayanami possesses Mikage, releasing only one Kor wing. Teito and Mikage, who is possessed by Ayanami, fight, but Teito is injured and escapes with the help of one of Castor's doll. Meanwhile, at the main Church, Castor senses that his doll has lost signal and Frau senses that a half Kor has entered the church. He goes off to find Teito. Teito in the meanwhile, has been found by Ayanami, and Teito begs him to give Mikage back. Ayanami puts a restraining collar on Teito's neck. Teito attempts to commit suicide in order to save Mikage, only falling unconscious. A guardian appears, and there is a flash of light as Teito's eyes open, revealing his irises to be blood red. Ayanami looks down in surprise as Teito asks "Who are you to hurt my master?"
9	"The Color of His Soul Will Be Forever..."; Transliteration: "Tamashii no Iro wa Eien ni..." (Japanese: 魂の色は永遠に...)	June 2, 2009
Mikage, controlled by Ayanami, is still fighting Teito while Frau is on his way. Teito finally awakens with his eyes bloody-red and the Eye-of-Mikhail on his hand. The Collar on Teito's neck is close to bursting. Half out of control, Teito sends out multiple shots of Zaiphon damaging mass of the room. Ayanami uses a Binding-Zaiphon to strangle him and stop him, so he can't do much damage. Frau finally appears recognized by Ayanami as the God "Zehel", one of the Seven Ghosts. Frau cuts off the strangling Threads from Teito and tries to stop Ayanami. Frau uses his catch phrase, "May god be with you", revealing who he is to Teito. Ayanami and Frau have a little discussion. In a short period of time where the scythe is close to Mikage, Ayanami takes action and pushes the Scythe away. A short part of the Wing is cut off. Ayanami stops controlling Mikage, while Mikage's Wing starts to shatter. Feathers appear and Mikage is starts to vanish. Teito rushes to Mikage, but then Mikage vanishes. Frau then takes Teito to his dorm. Moments appear, where Teito and Mikage befriended and some things what happened. Frau visits Teito, and Teito notices a cute pet which is crawling close to him, which turns out to be the reincarnation of Mikage. Frau tries to remove Teito's collar but ends up making pact with him meaning Frau has become Teito's master.
10	"That is But One Form of Atonement"; Transliteration: "Sore wa Tada Hitotsu no Tsugunai" (Japanese: それはただひとつの償い)	June 9, 2009
Teito decides to leave the church believing he should not cause anyone any more trouble, on the way he meets Castor who asks him if he knows the shinigami Zehel. When Teito reveals he knows it was Frau, Castor puts him to sleep. As Castor gets ready to erase his memories, Frau interferes and says that if he is to erase his memory of seeing him as Zehel, then he will also forget Mikage's last smile. As he leaves, Frau's scythe goes out control and tries to attack an unconscious Teito, who awakens as the god Mikhail. Mikhail insulted then uses illusions to threaten Castor and Frau who can barely stand against Mikhail's power, Mikhail realising that they are the seven ghosts says that if they were normal humans then they would have died or passed out. Castor tells Frau that the collar on Teito's neck has three commands: Bind, Sleep and Pain. Frau puts Mikhail to sleep with the sleep command. Teito regains concisousness and is taken to a place showing Mikage's last words.
11	"Atonement for Loved Ones is..." Transliteration: "Itoshiki Mono e no Tsugunai wa..." (Japanese: 愛しき者への償いは...)	June 16, 2009
Teito, now staying in the church, wonders what he can do to atone for Mikage's death. Castor advises him to take the Bishops Exam. Teito decides to take it, and Castor says he must pass the written exam first: memorize 7700 chapters from 77 volumes of Barsburg Bible in half a month. It took Frau three years to memorize it, but when Teito takes a look at one of the books, he realizes he has read them before. Teito reveals he remembers most of it when Castor tests him. The second exam tests the person's ability to use Zaiphon techniques. Teito tries using it, but fails. Castor gives him a sort of pin that proves he is taking the Bishops Exam. When Teito doesn't progress with using a bascule, or staff, Castor gives Teito a Frau doll with incredible speed. After the doll acts like a pervert to the three sisters, Teito activates the staff and blows the doll up. After a talk with Labrador, Teito decides to learn and expose the truth of the world. While wandering in the hall, Teito sees a person looks like Mikage, but unfortunately is an examinee named Hakuren Oak. Hakuren sees the Bishops Exam Participant Clip on Teito's neck and declares Teito his rival.
12	"The Darkness Called "Pain" Treads Ever Closer..."; Transliteration: "Itami to Iu Na no Yami wa Hitahita to..." (Japanese: 痛みという名の闇はひたひたと...)	June 23, 2009
A man is seen making an agreement with a Kor, and being possessed by it. Then it switches to Teito and Hakuren who get into an argument, and both of them agree that if they weren't in a Church, they'd beat each other up. Then as Hakuren walks away, Mikage jumps from Teito's shoulder to Hakuren's head. Teito rushes after them and ends up watching Assistant Arch-Bishop Bastian demonstrating how to destroy a Kor without hurting the vessel. When its over, Teito runs into Frau, Castor, and Labrador. They encourage him in his studies, and Castor tells Teito that starting that night he's going to give Teito special training. Teito is finally moved from the guest room, into the dorms for the Bishop Candidates. It turns out that his roommate is Hakuren Oak. After cleaning his Bascule, Hakuren declares that they should practice with their Bascules. So they make their way to the training room where they're greeted by the gate keeper who turns out to be an ex-criminal. Suddenly, Aldo, the gate keeper, collapses. Teito and Hakuren take him to the infirmary, causing them to be late to class. The Bishop Candidates enter the training hall, where hundreds of Kor are trapped in a water barrier. Teito finally understands how to use his Bascules after some help from Hakuren and Assistant Arch-Bishop Bastian. He even accidentally blows up the training hall with his zaiphon.
13	"Down the Path of Light I See..."; Transliteration: "Hikari Aru Michi no Saki ni Miru Mono wa..." (Japanese: 光ある道の先に見るものは...)	June 30, 2009
Aldo, the criminal, is mysteriously murdered. Later that night Teito can't sleep so he goes for a walk. He ends up stopping by a picture of a woman holding a baby. Then he gets a flashback of a strange man holding him when he was a child. He then returns to his room. The next day Teito heads towards the library and ends up seeing a vision of his past again, causing him to fall out of his chair. He then is joined by Hakuren and Frau. Hakuren gives a book to Frau, which ends up being one of Frau's many porn stashes. The two instantly bond after that. Then Assistant Arch-Bishop Bastian comes and confiscates it after hitting Frau upside the head. They both leave after that. Later Teito is seen looking for Frau's room in order to return his broken Bascule. As he approaches it he overhears Frau and Castor talking about him. Frau senses someone at the door and opens it to reveal a shocked Teito. He apologizes to Frau, then runs off upset. He has another flashback about his life as a church orphan with "Father." Later he and Frau have a talk about the Eye of Mikhail, where Teito accuses Frau and the Church of wanting the power of The Eye. Frau in turn tells Teito that its up to him to decide whether or not to trust them. A mysterious figure is seen challenging Castor, by almost attacking him.
14	"A Reason to Fight Together... The Right to be Called Brothers in Arms"; Transliteration: "Issho ni Tatakau Riyū... Senyū to Yobareru Kenri" (Japanese: 一緒に戦う理由... 戦友と呼ばれる権利)	July 7, 2009
Castor, Labrador, and Frau talk about the mysterious figure who attacked Castor. That night Teito begins his special training with Castor and the "Frau" dolls. When Teito returns to his room, Hakuren inquires about what he was doing so late at night. As Teito changes, Hakuren notices the sklave tattoo on Teito's lower back. Then, Hakuren tells Teito the reason he wants to become a Bishop. One night during his training session, Castor gives him a professional-grade Bascules and tells him to try it out on the "Frau" dolls. He sends them flying and when he's done, Castor invites Hakuren to join them since he'd been watching the whole thing for a while. On the way back, both Hakuren and Teito are attacked by a shadow monster. They are saved by Frau. Both of them wake up back in Frau's room and Frau explains that what attacked them was a Wars. Teito declares that when he becomes strong enough to protect Hakuren, he wants to become his friend. Frau makes a vague comment about what the scythe is doing to him.
15	"That Day, I Was Certainly With Him"; Transliteration: "Sono Hi, Watashi wa Kare to Tashika ni Atta" (Japanese: その日、私は彼と確かにあった)	July 14, 2009
Teito states that he's putting his all into studying for the Bishop's Exam. Teito is to short to reach a book so Hakuren goes to help him, but Teito jumps up and reaches it before Hakuren, who says "Was that really necessary?" The two boys are approached by an unknown Bishop who gives Teito a Bishop's Pass and message from the owner of the pass, whose name was Fea Kruez. Castor attacks the strange man, who disappears in a cloud of black smoke, but not before saying that the Church isn't on Teito's side and to ask "That foolish Bishop" about it. So Teito confronts Labrador, Frau, and Castor. They tell him that its up to him to decide whether or not to trust them. Frau fights one of the Black Hawks, who disappears right before Church Guards come. They arrest Frau for holding a Warfeil weapon. Teito then goes to a room to clear his feelings. Then it is revealed the Fea Kruez is the one he calls "Father". Then Teito finally decides to trust all of them.
16	"Truth Lies in the Dark Abyss Where the Light Cannot Reach"; Transliteration: "Shinjitsu wa Hikari no Todokanu Yami no Soko ni" (Japanese: 真実は光の届かぬ闇の底に)	July 21, 2009
Labrador tells Castor and Teito that Fraus be given the death sentence. So Teito goes off in search of the prison that Frau is being kept in. Lazette ends up taking Teito deep under water where the prison is. Frau and Teito talk, and Frau refuses to breakout with Teito. Frau tells Teito that if he "Wants to put him at ease, then smile." He also dedicates a verse from their bible to him. Teito starts to swim away, then suddenly turns around and give Frau the funniest smile. It shocks Frau so much that he drops his apple. Teito then exits the waterway and Hakuren appears and gives him a towel. That night they both decide to investigate the tower where Frau was arrested.
17	"The Family With Wings of Darkness, Enshrouded in Misery, Flies Down"; Transliteration: "Yami no Tsubasa no Kenzoku wa, Fukō o Matoi, Maioriru" (Japanese: 闇の翼の眷属は、不幸を纏い、舞い降りる)	July 28, 2009
The boys are soon joined by Arch-Bishop Bastian, who tells them all about Frau's childhood. Then all of them leave, as the boys walk away Hakuren notices that their Bascules are tainted, which only happens when a Warsfeil touches them. They then realize that Bastian is the Warsfeil, so they rush after him. Meanwhile Bastian talks to Frau in his cell, then leaves. Teito and Hakuren successfully enter Bastian's room and find a secret passageway. At the end of the corridor is Bastian, who immediately attacks the boys, with the intent of killing Teito.
18	"The One Who Must be Forgiven Drowns in Darkness...The One Who Loves Him is Filled With Tears"; Transliteration: "Yurusazaru Mono Yami ni Obore ... Aisuru Mono wa Namida ni Nureru" (Japanese: 赦さざる者闇に溺れ...愛する者は涙に濡れる)	August 4, 2009
After Teitos knocked out, Hakuren continues to fight Bastian. Meanwhile Castor and Labrador decide to take action against the intruder. The inturder is Kuroyuri and Haruse from the Black Hawks. Labrador confronts and fights Haruse, who had stayed behind when Kuroyuri left to kill Frau. Hakuren was captured by a Wars and Teito is imprisoned in some kind of ball where a lot of Wars reside. Teito and the Eye of Mikhail begin to fight over control and while they do that some Wars enter Teitos body. Frau finally shows up and saves Teito and Hakuren. Kuroyuri goes to kill Frau, but ends up killing one of Castor's dolls instead. Castor overpowers Kuroyuri and uses his soul to talk to Ayanami.
19	"The One-Sided, Yet Never Dying Love Finds Itself..."; Transliteration: "Majiwaranu Ai, Saredo Kienu Ai no Yukusue wa..." (Japanese: まじわらぬ愛、されど消えぬ愛の行く末は...)	August 11, 2009
Castor uses Kuroyuri to speak with Ayanami. An explosion separates the two and Haruse catches Kuroyuri, while Labrador catches Castor. Then Kuroyuri and Haruse disappear. While participants in the exam of the church gather, the battle between the soldiers of the army and the protectors of the church continues. Bastian-sama gets a proper funeral to keep the truth under wraps and make life continue as normal. Meanwhile, Hakuren gets his up close and personal encounter with the Eye of Mikhail while he is taking care of Teito. After Teito wakes up, the darkness in his heart awakens the darkness that escaped into the Eye of Mikhail and Hakuren barely manages to grab Teito as the darkness engulfs them both...
20	"They Both Offer A Requiem"; Transliteration: "Futari de Sasageru Rekuiemu" (Japanese: ふたりで捧げるレクイエム)	August 18, 2009
After being captured by Ayanami, Teito and Hakuren escape the military air ship and get support from Frau. After an intense battle the Eye of Mikhail attempts to save Teitos life by separating itself from Teito and taking the Wars with it. After separation the Eye unleashes its full power to destroy the enemies threatening Teito, making it rain fire upon the enemy air ships. Frau decided to save Teito and leave the Eye of Mikhail to fall in enemy hands. After cheering Teito up for losing the Eye of Mikhail, the other bishops give Frau a plant. Because bishop Bastian fell into the darkness, he was not reborn as a human, instead he was reborn as a tree. Frau planted the tree in the garden of the church so Bastian would be with them for many years to come. Teito finally recognises Hakuren as his friend and prepares for the bishop exam. On their way to the exam Teito accidentally steps on a key token that one of the bishops dropped and broke it. Unfortunately for Teito, that same bishop, Lance, is their head examiner...
21	"Therefore, You Pass Through The Door Of The Defeated"; Transliteration: "Naze Yue ni, Nanji, Haisha no Tobira o Kuguru..." (Japanese: なぜゆえに、汝、敗者の扉をくぐる...)	August 25, 2009
The military found out about the Eye of Mikhail and its master, Teito, and decide to search for him. Teito finds out that his Zaiphon seems to have been drained since the leaving of the Eye of Mikhail. One of his friends gives Teito some of his energy to allow him to be able to continue. After the exam starts, all the aspirant bishops enter the first hall. This chamber uses the fear in peoples hearts to hold them down, after Teito gathers his resolve he manages to walk out as one of the first. The next challenge is to answer questions in several rooms using their Zaiphon while trying to stay alive. Halfway through the exam, Teito decides to help the old men to cross the rope bridge. Finally they reach the last challenge: the challenge states that only one of them can pass through the door of Victor and the other has to use the door of the Defeated. After fighting each other, the winner has to write his name on the wall before passing through the door of the Victor. After arguing about it, they both run off through the door of the Defeated, while writing "Damn You!" in place of the names. After passing, a voice inquires why they choose this door and Hakuren replies: "Nobody has been defeated and nobody has won" at which point Teito says: "I'm just here to be with my friend". Bishop Lance appears and tells them that their selfless solution made them pass.
22	"Led By The Light In The Water's Depth, He Spies Upon..."; Transliteration: "Minasoko no Hikari ni Michibikare, Nozokishi Mono wa..." (Japanese: 水底の光に導かれ、覗きしものは...)	September 1, 2009
After passing the first exam, Teito and Hakuren get to see the progress of others and how some fumble at the last challenge when their greedy nature makes them fail. Teito and Hakuren learn that the old guys they helped before were in fact Former Assistant Archbishops who tagged along to assess the progress of the participants. Meanwhile, the protectors of the church prepare for a dark threat as the military advances towards the church. Teito and Hakuren go to Lazet, the mermaid, as the Former Assistant Archbishops suggested and she takes them to an inner sanctuary where Teito gets to see his father and Father, the priest who raised him. He got told to never forget who he is, the Prince of Raggs Kingdom. Afterwards, they hurry back to the courtyard where bishop Lance is impatiently waiting for them. The second part of the exam is a challenge to face their inner daemons inside a room. They pass when they come out the other door. Hakuren starts off by defeating a gigantic Wars and Teito faces his biggest enemy: Ayanami in the flesh...
23	"Beyond The Heart's Darkness"; Transliteration: "Kokoro no Yami no Sono Saki ni" (Japanese: 心の闇のその先に)	September 8, 2009
The second exam resumes for the remaining trainees and comes in the worst form imaginable: the physical realisation of their deepest fears. When someone fails to overcome their fears, they fall through the bridge and fail. Teito gets to face his biggest enemy, Ayanami in the flesh. After charging blindly at Ayanami, Teito gets to see visions of the hurt and pain he caused Mikage and his family. Meanwhile, Hakuren finds his hated father on the ground with an unknown person in a black cape and weapon standing over him. Hakuren sees a vision of his father telling him he is no longer his son if he joins the church. The grim reaper tells Hakuren they should finish his father's pathetic, heartless life. The constant talking about Hakuren finally gets to Teito who is starting to blame himself for everything he has done to his best friend. When Ayanami charges at him, he is petrified and unable to move to dodge the attack and gets impaled by Ayanami's sword. Finally, the last trainees that haven't failed yet find the strength to face their fears. Hakuren saves his father and forgives him. Teito on the other hand is starting to go in shock. Some of the examiners worry for his life and urge bishop Lance to terminate the exam. It is then when Teito figures out that his real enemy is not Ayanami but himself, the part of him that is blaming himself for getting Mikage killed. When Teito is ready and attempts to leave the second examination, the rest of the church gets invaded by the imperial army. And when Teito opens the door to exit the examination room, he finds himself in a dark, underground corridor instead of the exit. After a few seconds someone walks from the darkness towards Teito and this time, it is the real Ayanami who is standing in front of him with a dark smile on his face...
24	"The Justice of Those Who Lack Love Is... Oh Heart That Is Stolen By Darkness, Forever..."; Transliteration: "Ai Naki Mono no Seigi wa Izuko ni... Yami ni Ubawareshi Kokoro yo, Eien ni..." (Japanese: 愛無き者の正義はいずこに...。闇に奪われし心よ、永遠に...)	September 15, 2009
Ayanami appears in front of Teito and Teito wonders if Ayanami is just an illusion like before. Ayanami mocks Teito for still relying on the Eye of Mikhail when it is not even there anymore. Ayanami uses his Zaiphon to bring Teito and himself to the center of the earth, where he threatens "it is the first and last world you shall ever see". Teito attacks Ayanami, who mocks him for being weak. Ayanami tells Teito to attack him for real, and Teito asks why he is here. In the hall, Frau is still waiting for Teito to exit the examination room and Hakuren runs up to him to tell him that imperial forces have stormed the church. Suddenly, Kuroyuri appears saying he wants to kill the gardener (Labrador) who killed Haruse. Bishop Lance gets into a fight with one of Ayanami's men. Meanwhile, Ayanami has Teito beaten to the ground and asks Teito if his memories of traveling with Fea Kreuz have returned yet and reveals he is aware that Kreuz would certainly leave something to him. Castor captures the man who was the spy in the church and asks why he became a puppet of the military. Labrador erases the memory of the spy, so he may start anew when one of Ayanami's men kills him. Ayanami's men attack Castor and Labrador and Labrador is thrown aback. Bishop Lance defeats the man who was attacking him. Kuroyuri throws dark energy at Frau and tells him to show his true form as Zehel. Ayanami, meanwhile, is trying to access Teito's memories but Fea Kreuz (Vetrag) is stopping him. Ayanami's arm gets torn off and Teito realizes that Father was one of the Seven Ghosts. Ayanami's arm regenerates and Teito knows he has to live for those who died for him. He throws another attack at Ayanami that gets deflected and Ayanami tells him that he hasn't changed at all. Frau keeps using his scythe to cut away at the darkness that Kuroyuri is emitting. It seems Kuroyuri is falling apart from the same thing that killed Haruse. However, the more Frau attacks, the darker Kuroyuri becomes. Teito and Ayanami continue fighting, with Ayanami remaining dominant and continuing to mock Teito for being weak, and Mikage gets hit by one of the attacks. Teito runs to catch the falling Mikage and realizes he has to remember what he is fighting for. Kuroyuri is pushed back by Frau's light, which he calls love. Frau tells Kuroyuri his justice is flawed and the black flowers Kuroyuri was holding fade away. Ayanami tells Teito to search his memories for the location of Pandora's Box, or the hostages in the church will die until Teito remembers.
25	"The Heart Is Led By The Truth On The Other Side..."; Transliteration: "Shinjitsu wa Ikue ni mo Tsuranaru Kokoro no Kanata ni..." (Japanese: 真実は幾重にも連なる心の彼方に...)	September 22, 2009
Teito uses the power of the Eye of Mikhail to summon Frau, Castor, Labrador, Lance, and the Black Hawks. He then sends them, himself, and Ayamani to a white place where they're surrounded by giant figures of the Seven Ghosts. Both groups start to battle each other in earnst. They become locked together in battle, until Ayamani splits the bonds. Then he and the rest of the Black Hawks disappear through a portal Kuroyuri summoned. Frau and the others disappear, too, leaving Teito alone with Mikage's spirit. They talk about how will Teito move on then Teito also leaves. Frau, Labrador, and Castor were all waiting for him as he exits the Bridge of Trials. They tell him that he passed the exam and is now an apprentence Bishop of Frau. Then they tell him that he and Frau are going to escape through a secret passage built for the Pope in case of emergency, Labrador explained that the secret passage has some twists and turns and they might get lost so Labrador summoned some flowers as their guide, then Frau and Teito said their farewells. Then Teito and Frau went inside the entrance on a Hawkzile. Teito bumps into Mikage's spirit, they talk briefly about what Teito will do. Teito declares his intentions of what he wants to do from now on, so they both said goodbye both of them where thinking they would meet again soon. So Frau and Teito got out of the secret entrance and escaped.
