= List of The Girl Who Leapt Through Space episodes =

This is a list of episodes for the Sunrise anime television series The Girl Who Leapt Through Space, often shortened to Sora Kake Girl. The episodes are directed by Masakazu Obara and produced by Sunrise and Bandai Visual. They are based on the original concept by the Sunrise animation staff. The anime began airing in Japan on the TV Tokyo television network on January 5, 2009.

== Episode list ==
No.	Title	Original release date
1	"Lone Noble Soul"; Transliteration: "Kokō no Tamashii" (Japanese: 孤高の魂)	January 5, 2009
Akiha's peaceful breakfast is interrupted when her sister Kazane tries to get Akiha to agree to an arranged marriage. With her younger sister Nami also making derisive remarks, Akiha and her robot servant and friend Imoko flee the house for the spaceport and school. Nami subsequently gives chase only to be stopped in her tracks by both her agoraphobia and lack of a student card. Akiha and Imoko are joined by two of Akiha's classmates who borrow an escape pod for Akiha so she has no need to return home. The escape pod encounters a gravity quake caused by the brain colony Leopard which Akiha and Imoko explore before meeting the eccentric AI face-to-face. Together with ICP officer Itsuki Kannagi who tries to arrest both Akiha and Leopard, they use their QT-Arms to prevent Leopard from crashing into Earth. At the end of the episode, Honoka Kawai shows up on Leopard and calls Akiha "The Girl Who Leapt Through Space".
2	"Envoy from the Next World"; Transliteration: "Ikai kara no Shisha" (Japanese: 異界からの使者)	January 12, 2009
After the commotion over the appearance of Leopard, Itsuki Kannagi is recalled by her superior while Akiha's classmate Julio rescues Akiha from floating in space. Back at home, Kazane apologizes to Akiha for trying to force her into marriage too soon. Honoka Kawai, the mysterious girl who was on Leopard, shows up as a student in Akiha's class and abducts Akiha after school. After using a machine to create their Q-TECTORs, Honoka and Akiha set off to an abandoned space factory in search of the Golden Orb to repair Leopard's antimatter cannons. Unfortunately, the two girls play right into the hands of Itsuki Kannagi and her partner Ul who have prepared an ambush. Itsuki defeats Honoka and surprises Akiha as she is preparing to take the parts Leopard needs, but the arrival of a huge robot that Honoka recognizes as a Nervalist automaton quickly endangers everyone.
3	"Golden Soul Shouts"; Transliteration: "Ōgon no Sōru Shautsu" (Japanese: 黄金のソウルシャウツ)	January 19, 2009
While Itsuki draws away its attention, Honoka injures the Nerval robot before helping Akiha flee with the Golden Orbs Leopard needs. The Golden Orbs now successfully installed, Leopard uses his Soul Shout to destroy the factory and the Nerval robot. The council in charge of the ICP determines that Itsuki has overstepped her authority and charges Bougainvillea and Mintao with Itsuki's capture. However, with the help of her supervisor Nina, Itsuki fakes her own death and goes undercover as a student at Akiha's school. After school, Honoka and Itsuki get into a serious fight, causing significant damage to the school property before Akiha stops them.
4	"Those Who Do Not Obey"; Transliteration: "Matsurowanu Monotachi" (Japanese: まつろはぬ者達)	January 26, 2009
Leopard steals more parts he needs by having Honoka and Akiha act as models. Itsuki is forewarned about Bou and Min who are assigned to investigate Akiha. Offended by the lack of recognition he gets online, Leopard uses Akiha's computer to send a threat to her school before telling Akiha to steal more parts during the school festival to fulfill the threat. Investigating the festival, Bou and Min are scared away by the sight of Itsuki who they think is a ghost. During the mission to steal the parts, Itsuki intercepts Akiha and handcuffs her. Leopard takes this as the ideal opportunity to phase away Akiha and Itsuki's Q-TECTORs as a prank. While Akiha and Itsuki are forced to declare a truce and escape undetected with Imoko's help, Honoka has already found and taken the part Leopard needs.
5	"Steel Maiden"; Transliteration: "Kōtetsu no Otome" (Japanese: 鋼鉄の乙女)	February 2, 2009
Honoka discovers that many more components are necessary -- one of which is on the moon. Akiha storms off the colony after getting into an argument with Leopard over his earlier prank. Kazane holds an emergency meeting with the other Shishido trustees regarding the bounty hunter and Ex-QT Aleida kidnapping the youngest Shishido daughter, the child genius Sakura, along with fighting another of the Shishidos, Takane. While Honoka unsuccessfully tries to get Akiha to come back, Min and Bou are again ordered to capture Itsuki. Itsuki and Ul break into Akiha's house and force Akiha to lead them to Leopard, playing right into the hands of Bou and Min, who ambush them in their QT-Arms, showcasing their ability to fight both together and separately. Leopard's timely arrival turns the tide of the battle as he releases Akiha's QT-Arms. After Bou and Min are sent packing, Honoka agrees to let Itsuki meet Leopard if she helps them retrieve the next part from the Moon.
6	"White Black Belt"; Transliteration: "Shiroki Kuroobi" (Japanese: 白き黒帯)	February 9, 2009
Akiha, Honoka, and Itsuki arrive at St. Artemis Correctional Facility on the Moon, where the Golden Orb Warmer Leopard needs is stored. While Kazane continues monitoring their progress, Akiha and her friends infiltrate St. Artemis. Ul mistakenly releases all the prisoners while disabling the security system, causing a riot that Bougainvillea and Mintao are sent to investigate. While Akiha is caught up in the prison riot, Itsuki and Honoka find that Sakura is being held deep within St. Artemis, after brief fighting with Sakura's robot bodyguard. A video feed showing Takane held prisoner by Aleida and a legion of brainwashed Nervalists prompts Akiha to rush to the rescue, with Honoka and Itsuki on her heels. Leopard arrives to retrieve the sought-after component, but plays right into Nerval's hands as Nerval reveals himself from where he was hiding on the Moon.
7	"Battle of the Gods"; Transliteration: "Kamigami no Tatakai" (Japanese: 神々の闘い)	February 16, 2009
As Nerval and Leopard face off, Aleida flees with Takane, with Akiha and her friends in pursuit in their QT-Arms. Bou and Min, who arrived to investigate the prison riot, are able to nearly capture Itsuki, but all three are frozen when Nerval releases a freezing attack on Leopard. Soon after, Akiha and Itsuki are frozen too. Kazane receives the control doll Morihime from the Shishido ruling council, which she uses to commandeer orbital mirrors to unfreeze Leopard, who is able to use his Soul Shout to defeat Nerval. Unfortunately, another brain colony named Xanthippe unexpectedly shows up and escapes with Nerval, who vows vengeance. After the battle, Kazane tells Akiha that it is her destiny to fight Nerval alongside Leopard.
8	"An Invitation to the Darkness"; Transliteration: "Kurayami e no Izanai" (Japanese: 暗闇へのいざない)	February 23, 2009
The Shishidos and Itsuki meet Leopard, but annoy him too much and get thrown out. Everyone decides to relax at a hot spring inside the colony, where Kazane explains that the Shishidos were involved in the original fight against Nerval many years ago, when the brain colonies were first created and Nerval attempted to enslave humanity. As they are resting, a crocodile-like creature living inside Leopard steals the Golden Orb's cooling system. Akiha, Honoka, and Itsuki are forced to search for a map to figure out where the cooling system was taken, and encounter a headless ghost knight in the library, which agrees to give them a map in return for a head. They track down the cooling system and recover it, while also encountering an octopus-like creature that fights the crocodile. In the meantime, Bou and Min are reprimanded for their failures and threatened with termination. Later, as they are walking around in civilian clothes, a giant saw cuts off part of the space habitat.
9	"Q-Speed Infinity"; Transliteration: "Kyū Soku Mugendai" (Japanese: Q速∞)	March 2, 2009
This episode takes place in an alternate reality in which the QT force is used for baseball, but has been mostly banned. Akiha is the mysterious masked pitcher while Honoka is her catcher. Itsuki is a former baseball player with QT powers who is recruited to stop the masked pitcher. Itsuki is afraid to use her QT powers, but still manages to stalemate Akiha at their initial encounter due to Akiha nearly collapsing from overuse of Magi-QT. Itsuki seeks out the baseball demon Leopard, and uses the QT powers she learns to win against Akiha, but collapses afterwards. However, it turns out that the chief of the baseball league was behind everything and wants to keep QT users banned, so Akiha unleashes all her power to defeat him.
10	"The Girl in the Box"; Transliteration: "Hakoiri no Musume" (Japanese: 箱入りの娘)	March 9, 2009
Itsuki rejoins the ICP with help from Nina. A mysterious box shows up that asks to be delivered to the head of the Shishido family, saying it has information about Enigma. Itsuki brings the box to Akiha at school, and they realize that there is a human inside. In the meantime, Honoka meets with the Shishido family elders, who turn out to be old friends of hers. The box is nearly destroyed after being mistaken for trash, but Akiha and Itsuki save it and take the box to the Shishido family home, where they discover that the person inside the box is a renegade Nervalist. Before the box-human is able to meet the head of the Shishido family, Aleida attacks and takes the box back. During the battle, when Aleida is briefly unmasked, Akiha realizes that Aleida is the person she has been seeing in her dreams.
11	"The Mirror Adherents"; Transliteration: "Kagami Shinja-tachi" (Japanese: 鏡信者たち)	March 16, 2009
After recovering, Akiha learns that there is a thief stealing Energizer Mirrors. Instead of going to school, Honoka and Akiha go to Leopard in order to set up a trap for the thief. One of the members of the Surre Academy Student Council, Tsutsuji Baba, is revealed to be a Nervalist agent, and is introduced by Aleida to the AI Benkei, who is the mirror thief. Kazane confronts Nami over her refusal to face her past, causing Nami to run away and eventually suffer a nervous breakdown. Itsuki is assigned by the ICP to track down Bou and Min, who they think are the mirror thieves, but are actually working to help bait the trap. Everything comes together when Itsuki catches up to Bou and Min and Bankei takes the bait laid by Leopard, while at the same time Aleida recruits Nami to Nerval's side.
12	"A Blank Large Image"; Transliteration: "Utsuro naru Kyozō" (Japanese: 虚ろなる巨像)	March 23, 2009
Benkei reveals that he and Leopard previously knew each other, then rams Leopard. After a brief fight, Benkei encases Leopard in an airtight box, requiring use of the Leopard Cannon to break out, while at the same time Kazane and the Shishido elders hijack the ICP's remote attack vessels for use against Benkei. However, Benkei absorbs Leopard's Soul Shout and fires back at Leopard, while Tsutsuji activates Nerval's Exclusive Control, taking over the Shishido family's systems. Immediately afterward, Xanthippe phases in with reinforcements and attacks Kirkwood. Furious, Leopard rams Benkei, plunging them both into Earth's atmosphere. Akiha attempts to stop Leopard's fall along with Honoka and Itsuki, but is hindered by Takane, now a Nervalist vassal due to her time in captivity on the Moon.
13	"The Abandoned Earth"; Transliteration: "Suterareta Daichi" (Japanese: 棄てられた大地)	March 30, 2009
Akiha has crash landed on Earth. After reuniting with Leopard, Honoka, and Itsuki, Akiha and her companions float down a river towards an old dome, but are watched by primitive tribesmen. The dome turns out to be the abandoned Kirkwood embassy to Earth, and Itsuki reveals she was born there. However, before they can explore further, they are captured by the tribesmen. As Honoka is about to be burnt at the stake, a giant ship appears, which the tribesmen call a devil and Itsuki recognizes as related to the Terra Abduction. The ship is aided by ghostly figures that look like Honoka, who she refers to as her sisters, and they enthrall the tribesmen. With the help of Sakura, who shows up to rescue them, they force the enemy to retreat. Trying to find a way off the Earth, they travel to an island, where they find an old man named Friedrich Otto Noblemain, who captures their ship with a QT rose.
14	"The Night The Flower Opens"; Transliteration: "Yoru Hiraku Hana" (Japanese: 夜ひらく花)	April 6, 2009
After Akiha and Itsuki prevent Honoka from strangling him, Friedrich is revealed to be the creator of all the brain colonies, but tells them he has no means of returning to space. Kirkwood is under the control of the Nervalists, and Aleida continues to persuade Nami to join the Nervalists, while Bou and Min join up with the Kirkwood refugees and are hired by Nina. Back on Earth, Itsuki learns that the structure behind that Terra Abduction incidents is an orbital elevator called the Pied Paper, and later everyone learns that Friedrich is responsible for taking Leopard's components, since he worried that Leopard would betray humanity. The Pied Piper attacks Friedrich's island but is repulsed by his QT roses. Tsutsuji and Benkei try to hijack Sakura's ship, but are stopped. Aleida takes Nami to a place where she says Nami will gain her rightful power, and calls Nami "the girl who leapt through space".
15	"Witch Horserider"; Transliteration: "Majo no Kikō" (Japanese: 魔女の騎行)	April 13, 2009
Akiha and her friends plan to get back into space by hijacking the orbital elevator, and Friedrich gives them miniature QT roses to guard against the mind control ability of Existence. The orbital elevator takes them into space, and as they look down on earth, Xanthippe appears with Nami and Aleida. As Xanthippe loads the new box humans from the Pied Piper, Aleida gives Nami a staff that will greatly increase Nami's power. Akiha tries to talk Nami out of it, but Nami lashes out at her and takes the staff anyway, using its powers to fight Akiha. Sakura start drilling through Xanthippe's hull, causing Xanthippe to unleash a reckless counterattack that hits the orbital elevator and interrupts the fighting. As Xanthippe, Aleida, and Nami escape, Aleida spots Sakura's ship with Leopard on it, and has Nami command Existence to attack Leopard mentally, traumatizing him.
16	"Disturbed Universe"; Transliteration: "Wadakamaru Uchū" (Japanese: わだかまる宇宙)	April 20, 2009
With Kirkwood is still under Nervalist control, Emilio and the Student Council escape from Surre Academy, hijack a ship, and go to meet with the refugees. In another area of the colony, Nami meets with Nerval, who has taken human form. Meanwhile, Akiha and her companions are now marooned near Jupiter, having been caught by the edge of Xanthippe's hyperjump due to Akiha chasing after Nami, and Ul estimates it will take them five years to get back. After an argument between Akiha, Honoka, and Itsuki over a variety of issues, Tsutsuji and Benkei again try to take over the ship, but are simply ignored. Leopard's colony is spotted orbiting Jupiter, having activated its emergency systems to escape and recover, and they install Leopard back in it. Just as they finish, a mysterious electrical storm envelops the colony.
17	"The Ring of Friendship"; Transliteration: "Tomodachi no Wa" (Japanese: 友達の輪)	April 27, 2009
Engulfed by the electrical storm, Leopard's colony begins falling towards Jupiter. Sakura's scarf and hat reveals itself as an alien named Yupitan, and suggests using the Benkei colony (which is still attacked to Leopard's colony as a result of their fight) to provide the additional acceleration needed to escape from Jupiter's gravity well. With help from Tsutsuji and the QT-Arms, the plan is successful, and they come across an abandoned space station. Yupitan tells them it was the old base of the Shishido family when they were fighting Nerval, and they discover that the energy stored there will allow them to hyperjump back to Kirkwood. However, Leopard refuses to hyperjump, so they get Benkei to do it instead. At the refugees, Bou and Min are assigned to help infiltrate Surre Academy, but they see Nami brutally force one of the students into a box and run away, leading the Nervalist forces to the refugees. As Nami leads an assault on them, Leopard and Benkei suddenly appear.
18	"The Revived God"; Transliteration: "Yomigaeru Kami" (Japanese: よみがえる神)	May 4, 2009
Seeing Leopard, Nami is stunned, and when Akiha races towards her, Nami commands the Nervalist forces to retreat. Seeing his chance, Benkei separates from Leopard, and steals two of Leopard's mirrors before escaping. Akiha, Honoka, and Itsuki meet with Elle and Emilio, who decide to transfer as many people as possible to Leopard's colony. Due to the Existence attack, Leopard is still unable to connect to his colony, so Akiha tries to cheer him up, but fails. With pressure from Elle and advice from Itsuki, they hold a party to cheer Leopard up. After the party, Leopard and Akiha share a private moment looking up at the Earth and the Moon, and have a heart-to-heart talk. Akiha shows Leopard that everyone is encouraging him, and Leopard is able to connect to his colony again just as Xanthippe attacks. He successfully fights her off with the Leopard cannon, but in the aftermath, Akiha is kidnapped by Aleida.
19	"A Closed Maze"; Transliteration: "Tojita Meikyū" (Japanese: 閉じた迷宮)	May 11, 2009
Hiding out inside a volcanic asteroid, Tsutsuji and Benkei are ambushed by Leopard, who takes back his mirrors. As everyone investigates Akiha's kidnapping, Leopard wants to chase after Nerval immediately, but the citizens are anxious about power failures. Nina orders Bou and Min to investigate the colony underground with Itsuki's guidance, and they soon find a hot spring. While relaxing in the hot spring, they are attacked by an octopus-like creature, which captures Bou and Min. Itsuki escapes and warns everyone to evacuate, but is captured herself until Kazane, newly arrived, rescues everyone. Akiha and Imoko find themselves inside Xanthippe, and attempt to escape, only to find that the colony contains row upon row of boxes, as elsewhere Nerval shows a factory responsible for creating the boxes to Nami. Xanthippe declares that humans are merely the component parts of brain colonies. Akiha tries to run, but the box humans report her, and she is captured and forced into a box.
20	"Silver Pursuit"; Transliteration: "Hakugin no Tsuiseki" (Japanese: 白銀の追跡)	May 18, 2009
Aboard Xanthippe, Akiha wakes up inside her box, with Imo-chan still trying to get her out and Leopard still searching for her. After Akiha's friends return from an unsuccessful search, they decide that Akiha must be in Kirkwood. However, Honoka collapses soon after, and reveals that her lifespan is nearly over. In the meantime, Kazane talks with Leopard, discussing how they can find Leopard's last three parts. When Benkei shows up to challenge Leopard again, Kazane successfully negotiates with Tsutsuji for the pair to retrieve the Proxima Crown for Leopard. The student council approaches Kazane, asking to be allowed to infiltrate Kirkwood, and Kazane links them up with Itsuki, while Honoka goes to talk to Professor Fon on Earth. Back at Kirkwood, Nami, Aleida, and Takane encounter a spybot from the UURE while stamping out the resistance, which attacks Nerval and steals information from him. They manage to destroy the spybot as it tries to escape, but Nami is stabbed by it and falls to the ground.
21	"A Tiny Bit of Courage"; Transliteration: "Chiisana Yūki" (Japanese: 小さな勇気)	May 25, 2009
Leopard arrives at the Innsmouth Reef. Though he still wants to retrieve Akiha before anything else, Kazane keeps him searching for the Sword, one of the last three parts he needs. Akiha, meanwhile, is still trapped in the box, but has figured out how to get food and drink and starts to grow accustomed to the box, causing Imo-chan to worry. Elsewhere, Nami wakes up in the Cafe Enigma and finds Nerval making food on an old-fashioned stove, and Aleida soon shows up to help. However, he angers Nami when he tells her that Akiha will soon come to the Cafe, and she storms out. Benkei and Tsutsuji successfully retrieve the Crown from the Sun, taking damage from the Sun's corona in the process. Imo-chan keeps trying to get Akiha out of the box, and finally succeeds by reminding Akiha of their memories together. They escape, but return to Kirkwood to find it and Xanthippe under missile attack by the UURE. Xanthippe deflects the missiles with Nerval's Exclusive Control, but is unable stop one of the missiles. To save everyone, Imo-chan takes control of their escape pod and rams the missile, causing it to explode.
22	"The Gloomy Journey"; Transliteration: "Kurai Tabiji" (Japanese: 冥(くら)い旅路)	June 1, 2009
Akiha is rescued by Itsuki, but the student council ship is pursued by Nervalists and forced to take shelter in Kirkwood. The UURE, which has taken over the Moon, is planning another attack. However, their plan is interrupted by Nerval, who appears and freezes the whole Moon. On Earth, Honoka gets Fon to come with her by hitting him with a bowling pin and kidnapping him. Akiha can't come to grips with Imo-chan being gone, but she, Itsuki and the student council find a box human factory and meet up with one of the Shishido elders. He leads them to a box human disposal factory, where they rescue people pretending to be dead and bring them to a hiding place inside Kirkwood. However, many of the rescued are deeply traumatized and long for their boxes. Xanthippe discovers and attacks them, and is about to prevent their escape when Benkei rams her. With prompting from Tsutsuji, Benkei further helps the rebels, along with Takane, who has broken Nerval's control. Benkei escapes with everyone on board and jumps to the Innsmouth Reef, where they see Leopard.
23	"Secret Sword, Shine"; Transliteration: "Hiken, Kagayaku" (Japanese: 秘剣, 輝く)	June 8, 2009
With Leopard connected to the Proxima Crown that Benkei found, the Shishido elders volunteer to search for the sword. Nerval instructs Xanthippe to destroy Leopard and Aleida to kidnap Akiha, while Takane is told to protect Akiha. Akiha is still in mourning for Imo-chan, and runs away when Itsuki tries to comfort her. She goes to Leopard's core to talk to him, but Leopard's inconsiderate words only make Akiha mad, just as Xanthippe appears. Aleida successfully breaks into Leopard, but Takane prevents her from kidnapping Akiha. Itsuki then rescues Akiha from box people, but they are attacked by the Existence. Bou and Min come across Honoka and Fon in space and bring them to Leopard, where Fon causes QT-roses to grow on Proxima Crown, disabling the Existence and freeing the box people. Finally, Sakura and the Shishido elders return with Leopard's Sword, which finally completes him. Both Honoka and Itsuki swear to protect Akiha, and Akiha makes her decision, activating the Sword with the golden gun and allowing Leopard to use it to disable Xanthippe. At the end of the episode, Imo-chan is revealed to be still alive... but with Nerval.
24	"Call of The End"; Transliteration: "Shūmatsu no Yobigoe" (Japanese: 終末の呼び声)	June 15, 2009
Xanthippe reveals that Nerval was the one who actually destroyed the missile that everyone thought Imo-chan had rammed, and that he transported Imo-chan to him. Akiha is determined to rescue Imo-chan, but Kazane stops her. Leopard exults over his competition, and begins a conversion with Dark Leopard, his alter ego. Dark Leopard questions why Leopard serves humans, and encourages him to rule humanity, reminding him of how he once ruled with fear and unbelievable power. Imo-chan, having awakened, explains to Nerval why she tried Akiha and how she loves Akiha. Nerval, in turn, explains to Nami and Imo-chan how he made a mistake 50 years ago, and is now trying to learn more about humans. After Nerval and Aleida confer, Nerval tries to get Benkei to help him again, but Tsutsuji refuses, causing Nerval to realize that he can never completely understand humans. Nami encourages him to become a devil emperor, but Nerval refuses and says that he only wishes for rational agreement between humans and colonies. Meanwhile, Akiha and friends are going to rescue Nami, disobeying Kazane's orders, when Benkei appears to attack Leopard. However, Leopard has been taken over by Dark Leopard, and retaliates viciously. Jumping to Kirkwood, Leopard declares himself the absolute ruler of humanity, and begins destroying everything nearby. As Akiha and her friends try to reach Leopard's core, Nerval arrives to help stop Leopard.
25	"Fading Gods"; Transliteration: "Tasogareru Kamigami" (Japanese: 黄昏(たそが)れる神々)	June 22, 2009
Nerval explains to Imo-chan that this is Leopard's true appearance, as Imo-chan wonders which side she should be on. The refugees begin evacuating Leopard, as Leopard and Nerval fight. After an exchange of fire, Nerval is heavily damage. Akiha leaves to try to rescue Imo-chan, but Nerval flees, and Akiha and Nami meet near Cafe Enigma. Nami declares that she will kill all her sisters and attacks Akiha while also calling the Existence. Aleida arrives and challenges Nami, but Nami attacks her, bringing down Itsuki and Honoka as well. As Nami prepares to kill the, Akiha uses the golden gun to shoot Nami, causing a huge Anti-QT explosion. The Existence switch to protecting Akiha, and Aleida, now returned to being Kagura, reveals that Akiha is the true Girl who Leaps Through Space. Akiha returns to Kirkwood, where Kagura explains more about the Girl who Leaps Through Space, and tells Akiha that her destiny is to end the brain colony wars. They decide that their mission now is to destroy Leopard. Nerval explains to Imo-chan that his objectives are simply to achieve perfect order, with enough space to live, where humans will be fulfilled, and that things just went wrong along the way. Nami and Leopard join forces, and Nami appears before the heroes as the spokesman for Leopard. Leopard fires a demonstration shot at the earth, and we see nice Leopard inside Dark Leopard, wondering where he is.
26	"The Universe At Your Feet"; Transliteration: "Ashimoto ni Uchū" (Japanese: あしもとに宇宙)	June 29, 2009
Kazane goes over the plan to stop Leopard, assigning Akiha and Honoka to the job of attacking the brain, with the help of the Existence. Kagura asks to be allowed to deal with Nami, because she sees much of herself in Nami. Kagura confronts Nami, and tries to talk Nami out of fighting, but fails and is forced to defeat Nami. As everyone helps with the attack on Leopard, Akiha, Honoka, and the Existence break into Leopard itself as Sakura and the Shishido elders prepare to disable Leopard's power supply and QT-Roses, but Leopard moves and prepares to fire the cannon. He also creates a hyperspace rupture that prevents Akiha from reaching his core. As Leopard is about to fire the cannon, Xanthippe arrives to prevent the shot, along with Benkei and Nerval. Leopard attacks all three of them as Kazane negotiates an alliance with Nerval. Working together, Benkei blocks the sun from reaching Leopard, depriving Leopard of the power he needs, and then rams into Leopard, knocking off the Crown. Meanwhile, Itsuki has picked up Imo-chan from Nerval and brought her to Akiha. Akiha and Imo-chan have a joyous reunion, and with Fon's information on how to remove the limiter on Akiha's QT-Arms, they are able to penetrate the hyperspace rupture. Elsewhere, Kagura has exhausted Nami and breaks her staff, leaving Nami collapsed on the ground. Akiha arrives at Leopard's core within the hyperspace rupture, and commands the Existence to attack. However, when the real Leopard appears to retake control, she orders them to stop, but it turns out to be a trick of Dark Leopard. Leopard teleports everyone except Akiha and Imo-chan away, but Akiha successfully brings back the real Leopard by kicking through Dark Leopard. Dark Leopard is transferred into Nerval's human body, and Nerval commands Leopard to fire on Nerval, and Leopard does so, destroying Dark Leopard. In the aftermath, we see that Nerval has survived, Kagura and Honoka are told that they need immediate medical attention, Akiha is missing but soon found by Leopard, Bou and Min beg Nina to let them stay in the department of mysteries, and Tsutsuji and Benkei set off on their own path, having found Nami floating in space.
