= List of Asura Cryin' episodes =

The following is the list of episodes from the anime series Asura Cryin'. The anime is produced by Seven Arcs and directed by Keizou Kusakawa. The anime first premiered on April 2, 2009, on AT-X. Two pieces of theme music are used for the first season of the anime. The opening theme is titled "Spiral" by Angela, and the ending theme is "Link", also by Angela. A second season aired on October 1, 2009, on AT-X. The opening theme of the second season is "Alternative" and the ending theme is "Kanata no delight" both sung by Angela. The first episode of the second season uses the episode number 14, in chronological order from the first season which ended with 13 episodes.

As of September 29, 2009, Crunchyroll media-distribution website has obtained license to begin simulcasting the Asura Cryin' 2 anime sequel series on September 30, 2009, at 7:00 p.m. PDT. The stream, however, is only accessible to crunchyroll subscribed members in United States, Canada, the United Kingdom, Australia, New Zealand, and Ireland. Normal members only get to view the streams a week later. Streaming for the first season has also been announced by Crunchyroll.

== Series overview ==
Season	Episodes	Originally released (Japan)	
Season	Episodes	First released	Last released
1	13	April 2, 2009	June 25, 2009
2	13	October 1, 2009	December 24, 2009

== Episodes ==
=== First season ===
No. overall	No. in season	Title	Original Air Date
1	1	"Mechanical Demon God (Asura Machina)"; Transliteration: "Kikou Majin (Asura Makīna)" (Japanese: 機巧魔神(アスラ·マキーナ))	April 2, 2009
Tomoharu Natsume survived a horrible plane crash but Misao Minakami, his close friend, did not and became a ghost that continued to be attached to him. Three years later, he moved out to a place rented by his brother to live on his own and attend Raku High since his mother remarried. On his first day in his new house, a mysterious girl called Shuri turns up and gives him a silver briefcase to look after on behalf of his brother who lives abroad. Soon after, Tomoharu and Misao's ghost are attacked by various factions who all seek the 'Asura Machina' and 'Extractor'.
2	2	"The Issue on the Destroyed Future"; Transliteration: "Mirai ni Horobiru to iu Koto" (Japanese: 未来に滅びるということ)	April 9, 2009
After the events of the previous evening Tomo and Misao learn about the Royal Dark Society from Shuri. Later he runs into Takatsuki while visiting his new landlord and learns that she was the one who broke into his house in search of the briefcase. However, soon her father arrives and things get awkward for Tomo when he realises that he was one of the people responsible for the destruction of his house. Tomo is then confronted by the First Student Council President, Saeki Reishirou, who was also one of the people who raided his home.
3	3	"The Stained Shadow of the Light of Science"; Transliteration: "Kagaku no Hikari ga Otosu Kage" (Japanese: 科学の光が落とす影)	April 16, 2009
Having been captured by Saeki, Takatsuki is put on trial and sentenced to death for her involvement with Tomo. Meanwhile, Tomo rushes to retrieve the Asura Machina and save her from the First Student Council. However, when he finds the trunk empty he must rely on Shuri's help to save the day.
4	4	"The Feelings of Losing your Destination"; Transliteration: "Ikiba wo Nakushita Omoi" (Japanese: 行き場を無くした想い)	April 23, 2009
The science club head to Lake Tobi to investigate reports of a mysterious creature terrorising the area. Unbeknownst to them two fellow students, Kurasawa Rikka (the Second Student Council President) and Mahiwa are also in the area searching for the creature. It soon emerges that the monster is in fact a familiar that was abandoned by Mahiwa and has gone berserk. Armed with this knowledge the science club set out to reunite the two and stop the creature's rampage.
5	5	"Intersecting Hearts and Bodies"; Transliteration: "Majiwariau Kokoro to Karada" (Japanese: 交わり合う心と身体)	April 30, 2009
Days before his midterm exams, Tomoharu finds a wet and bloodied Shuri collapsed in front of his residence. Held tightly in her hand is another silver trunk. Trying to avoid the suspicious gaze of his neighbors, Tomoharu takes Shuri inside. When she awakes, Shuri is a different person, calling herself Yukari. Looking for information, Tomoharu and Misao pay a visit to the old church Shuri was living at, only to find newspaper articles of the crash three years earlier. At the church, Tomoharu and Misao run into a surprisingly handsome young woman...
6	6	"Sacrifice of Darkness"; Transliteration: "Yami no Mukō ni Ukabu Nie" (Japanese: 闇の向こうに浮かぶ贄)	May 7, 2009
Shuri's memory is back, but Tomoharu is out with a cold. That doesn't stop former student council president and Kanto Student Union Guardian Dragoon Yo from coming after Shuri's stabilizer. Unable to hand over the stabilizer that will free a burial doll from its Asura Machina, Shuri and Kanade fight back. Armed with Shirogane's ability to cut through space, Yo is a formidable opponent. Trying to buy time until Tomoharu's recovery, Shuri holds Yo off. However, it seems the two share a personal history. Shuri arranges to trade the real stabilizer with Susugihara for something very important to her. However, with Tomo still too ill to use Kurogane there is no-one to fight her when the trade goes badly wrong and as such they are forced to flee.
7	7	"Dream that was Dispersed into the Cruel Sky"; Transliteration: "Mujō na Sora ni Chitta Yume" (Japanese: 無情な空に散った夢)	May 14, 2009
With the installation of the stabilizer, Misao becomes visible to everyone. Seeing the new Misao adapting well to life as an ordinary school girl, Tomoharu reflects on the past. At the same time, Yo and Shuri think back to the events leading up to the accident and the day their peaceful lives came to an end. Now that Kurogane has absorbed the stabiliser, people can see Misao, but Tomo is worried that she won't be able to hide her incorporeal nature from those around her. Meanwhile, Haruna and Susugihara explore a strange set of ruins in search of the Caster Machina. These recent events prompt the group to look back on the tragic plane crash which started them in motion, not only for Misao and Tomo, but for Shuri and Susugihara as well.
8	8	"Ruling Maiden of Calamity"; Transliteration: "Saiyaku no Ō no Suemusume" (Japanese: 災厄の王の末娘)	May 21, 2009
With a large creature mysteriously attacking demons, Takatsuki is forced by her family to move in with Tomo so that he can protect her. At the same time Shuri arrives with a young demon named Ania, who Tomo also has to protect. However, Ania is a 'Luck-Eater' and causes misfortune to befall Tomo and his friends. Things get even more complicated when it turns out that Ania's sister, Kristina maybe involved with the demon hunts.
9	9	"Unexisting Being, Forbidden Being"; Transliteration: "Sonzai Suru Hazu no Nai Kinki no Sonzai" (Japanese: 存在するはずのない禁忌の存在)	May 28, 2009
When an Asura Crying appears during Reishirou's attempt to stop the culprit behind the demon hunts he explains how Tomo is also in danger of becoming one and orders him to leave the matter alone. However, with Ania desperate to find out what has happened to her sister and Tomo sworn to protect her it isn't long before he is face to face with the Asura Crying.
10	10	"Connecting the Chains of Time"; Transliteration: "Toki no Kusari ni Tsunagarete" (Japanese: 刻の鎖につながれて)	June 4, 2009
With Ania kidnapped by Takaya Kagakagari Tomo, Shuri, Misao and Takatsuki race to save her. Meanwhile Ania learns that Kagakagari plans to sacrifice all the demons in the city in order to lift the curse of the Asura Machina. By the time Tomo and the others arrive the ceremony has already begun and they must work quickly in order to save both Ania and Takatsuki.
11	11	"The Ordinary and Extraordinary That is Here With Us"; Transliteration: "Tonari ni Itekureru Nichijō to Hinichijō" (Japanese: 隣にいてくれる日常と非日常)	June 11, 2009
The Second years are preparing for a class trip to Hawaii. Meanwhile, Tomo and Misao attend a party hosted by Reishirou in memory of the anniversary of Aine's death. The party also features a very unusual performance competition in which everyone from Rikka to Takatsuki takes part and which Tomo and Misao end up winning.
12	12	"Till the End of Time"; Transliteration: "Sekai ga Kareru made" (Japanese: 世界が枯れるまで)	June 18, 2009
While, Shuri and Reishirou are enjoying their Second Year trip to Hawaii, Tomo accidentally stumbles across a Plug-In for the Asura Machina. However, Kagakagari also wants the device and he attacks Tomo and the others in order to retrieve it. As such Tomo is forced to break his promise to Takatsuki and use Kurogane to fend him off.
13	13	"The Mark of the Accursed Sinner"; Transliteration: "Norowareta Zainin no Rakuin" (Japanese: 呪われた罪人の烙印)	June 25, 2009
Kagakagari has taken a plane full of people hostage and offers to exchange their lives for the Igniter. However, the exchange soon turns violent putting the lives of the hostages at risk. Tomo must then attempt a very dangerous plan using Kurogane in order to save everyone that he cares about, but Aine was sacrificed in order to safely land the plane due to depleting her energy. Tomo had found out the truth of using an Asura Machina. What will he be willing to do next?

=== Second season ===
No. overall	No. in season	Title	Original Air Date
14	1	"The Obliterated World and Remnants of Memories"; Transliteration: "shoumetsu no sekai to kioku no zangai" (Japanese: 消滅の世界と記憶の残骸)	October 1, 2009
While being forced to clean the school pool Tomo and the rest of the Science Club stumble across a cavern which leads them to the Rakuroa Ruins. Here Tomo sees a strange vision of an alternate world. However, before he can learn more the group is attacked by Castas Machina guarding the ruins and Touru has to show up to save them.
15	2	"The Burial Doll Consumed by The Demon"; Transliteration: "akuma ni kuwareta beriaru dōru" (Japanese: 悪魔に食われた副葬処女（べリアル·ドール）)	October 8, 2009
Tomo is growing increasingly concerned about Misao and asks Shuri and Touru to locate his brother, Naotaka. In exchange Tomo must persuade the reclusive Science Club president Tokiya Kagayaki to return to school. However, this is not as easy as it first sounds so Tomo takes Misao and Takatsuki along to help. Tomo also learns that Touru and Tokiya have a very tragic connection to Kurogane.
16	3	"Free and Restricted Choices"; Transliteration: "jiyū de fujiyū na sentakushi" (Japanese: 自由で不自由な選択肢)	October 15, 2009
Tomo, Takatsuki, Misao, An and Higuchi are all enjoying a working vacation at the beach but it isn't long before Tomo manages to upset Misao. Meanwhile, Shuri and Ania are investigating the ruins on a nearby island. However, it seems that Kagakagari and Kristina are also interested in them, as is Kyomu Satomi and the First Student Council.
17	4	"The Price of Calling the Name of the Living Sacrifice"; Transliteration: "ikenie no na wo yobu daishō" (Japanese: 生け贄の名を喚ぶ代償)	October 22, 2009
Tomo and the others are apparently saved by Tomo's brother, Naotaka, and then taken in by Kagakagari and Kristina. Kagakagari reveals that the ruins are the remnants of an Asura Machina testing ground and that they may contain a way to free Burial Dolls like Kotori and Misao. However, before they can retrieve the device Kyomu arrives and tries to use Ania as a hostage.
18	5	"The Painful Relationship Between Love and Magic Power"; Transliteration: "ai to maryoku no setsunai kankei" (Japanese: 愛と魔力のせつない関係)	October 29, 2009
Following a mishap with some industrial strength glue while practicing for the three-legged race, Tomo and Takatsuki end up stuck together for the rest of the day. As if protecting each other's modesty and organising sleeping arrangements weren't trouble enough, Takatsuki's family is currently under threat from a rival group of demons who are out to assassinate them.
19	6	"The Truth that I Dedicate to You"; Transliteration: "kimi ni sasagu shinjitsu" (Japanese: 君に捧ぐ真実)	November 5, 2009
After receiving a cryptic warning from his brother, Tomo and the others come under attack from a mysterious woman and are forced into a trap set by Hiwako Torishima. The group are then saved by a powerful Asura Machina and Tomo makes a series of shocking discoveries about his brother, Misao and the Asura Machina themselves.
20	7	"Moment of Destruction, Darkness of Annihilation"; Transliteration: "kaimetsu no toki shōmetsu no yami" (Japanese: カイメツの刻 ショウメツの闇)	November 12, 2009
Despite having been arrested by Haruna, along with Tomo and the others, Ania is kidnapped by Hiwako's masked henchwoman. Hiwako then offers to trade Ania for Tomo and the group decides it is the perfect opportunity to ambush her, with Susugihara's help. However, things go badly wrong when it is revealed that Hiwako, Touru and Tokiya have been working together behind the scenes and even the appearance of Naotaka is not enough to halt their plans.
21	8	"Future Without Memories"; Transliteration: "omoide no kieta mirai" (Japanese: 思い出の消えた未来)	November 19, 2009
Following Hagane's attack Tomo awakes to find himself all alone in the First World with no idea of how to get back. He soon encounters the 'Witch of Rakurowa High School', a strange Daughter and very strange versions of the people he knows. However, after a chance encounter with Tokiya's sister Aki he is reunited with Takatsuki. He also learns more about the Superstring Gravity Reactor accident that started everything.
22	9	"Adjoined Death and Peace"; Transliteration: "Tonari awase no shi to heiwa" (Japanese: 隣り合わせの死と平和)	November 26, 2009
Having been reunited with Ania, Tomo learns more about the effects that the Superstring Gravity Reactor accident is having on the First World and Ania's involvement with it. Later when a large group of Daughters attacks the school Aki and Ania are forced to use their demonic powers to protect those they care about and Tomo learns that in this world he has powers of his own.
23	10	"Remaining Life, Scattered Life"; Transliteration: "Nokoru inochi, chiru inochi" (Japanese: 残る命、散る命)	December 3, 2009
Tomo finally gets to meet with the real Naotaka and learns that there is a way to save the First World even without Hagane. However, the plan is extremely dangerous and there is no guarantee that both Tomo and Misao won't be killed in the process. In the end the plan is a success but unfortunately Takatsuki ends up getting hurt and there is nothing Tomo can do.
24	11	"My Feelings for You Destroy the World"; Transliteration: "Kimi he no omoi ga sekai wo kowasu" (Japanese: 君への思いが世界を壊す)	December 10, 2009
Now back in the Second World Tomo and the others discover that they have 10 days until Tokiya can set his plan in motion. Tomo also discovers that he has inadvertently entered a contract with Takatsuki and that they now have a Daughter, Persephone. As if that wasn't enough Tomo is then appointed as the new President of the Third Student Council. Unfortunately, there is no time to deal with all of these new events as Tokiya has a found a way to accelerate his plan and Tomo must once again try to save the world.
25	12	"Despair at the Diverging Past and Causality"; Transliteration: "Kago to inga to wakare no zetsubou" (Japanese: 過去と因果と別れの絶望)	December 17, 2009
Tokiya has managed to open the gate to the Third World and the Second World has begun to vanish at an alarming rate. As such Tomo and the others must gain access to the Central Vortex in order to confront Tokiya and save the world. However, with Tokiya in control of not only Hagane but Hisui, Bismuth and Rhodonite as well that may not be as easy as it sounds.
26	13	"The Cogwheel of Choice"; Transliteration: "Sentaku no haguruma" (Japanese: 選択の歯車)	December 24, 2009
Natsume Tomoharu and his friends go to save the world. Tokiya Kagayaki wants to keep the Igniter so he could have a third world that has Aki, his lover. After Tomoharu defeated Tokiya, the Igniter seems to respond to Tomoharu's wish and closed the gate to the third world. After that, Ania Fortuna told Tomoharu that she completed the Splitter. So then she asked if Himazasa and Misao Minakami wanted to become human again and they did. After that everything became normal and all demons became humans. Everything from the First world disappeared including the Asura Machinas. Ania and Vivian returned to their normal sizes.
