= Garage Club =

- Genre: Rock music, tween comedy
- Created by: Pascal Stervinou Eric Parizeau Pascal Valdès
- Developed by: Rodolphe de Carini, Agnès Slimovici
- Country of origin: France
- Original languages: English; French
- No. of seasons: 2nd season in development
- No. of episodes: 26

Production
- Running time: 7 minutes

Original release
- Network: France 4, Nickelodeon (France)
- Release: November 14, 2009 – present

Garage Club is a French animated television series that aired on Nickelodeon (France) since September 2009 and on France 4 since September 2011.

== Concept ==
An abandoned locale serves as the center stage for the adventures and soul-searching of a teen rock band. However, the neighbours, who have been driven around the bend by their music, devise all sorts of incredible schemes to keep them from rehearsing.

The series develops two aspects at the same time:

- a "sitcom" aspect, featuring the band members’ trials and tribulations as teenagers, as well as their arguments over music in general and their rehearsals in particular;
- a "cartoon" aspect, featuring the various ploys the neighbors concoct to prevent the band from playing.

Each episode systematically ends with the failure of the neighbours’ plan and the launch of a new rehearsal, with the band members totally unaware of what they managed to avoid.

== Season 1 ==
1. Love story
2. Never Spike without Nick
3. "We're splitting !"
4. Shock wave
5. Big in Japan
6. A very trendy concert
7. Rage against the fur
8. Zoomusicology
9. Killer face
10. Valentine's troubles
11. No logo
12. Edward Scissorvoice
13. Anatomical Mushrooms
14. Zombie rock
15. Mighty Edward
16. Dumb and drummer
17. Megalo rock
18. Bioband
19. Love at first sight
20. Game over
21. LOL
22. Drum sticks
23. Momo's tomtom
24. Fan fun fool
25. Apocalypsound
26. Punk food
