= Hop! Channel =

Israeli children's TV channel

Hop! Channel ערוץ הופ!
- Country: Israel
- Broadcast area: Nationwide
- Headquarters: Tel Aviv, Israel

Programming
- Language: Hebrew
- Picture format: 576i SDTV

Ownership
- Owner: Zebra TV Channels Ltd.
- Sister channels: Hop! Israeli Childhood; Luli TV (HOT); WIZ! (Yes); Boom Hop! (Romania, formerly)

History
- Launched: February 2000; 26 years ago

Links
- Website: hop.co.il

Hop! Channel (Hebrew: ערוץ הופ!, Arutz Hop!) is an Israeli children's television channel aimed entirely for preschool children. The channel caters for children between the ages of zero and seven years old, presenting programs specifically tailored for these age-groups respectively. It was launched in February 2000 in Israel; it broadcasts daily between 5:00 am (in the past: 06:00 am) and 11:00 pm (in the past: 8:00 pm), as a part of the base packages of cable company HOT and satellite company yes.

== History ==
Hop! Channel was launched in February 2000 in Israel by Alona Abt and Tamir Paul. The channel caters for children between the ages of 1-7 years old, presenting programs specifically tailored for this age-group. It is one of the first channels in the world that belong to preschool children, in contrast to many other Israeli kids channels like Arutz HaYeladim that caters for children between the ages of seven and fourteen years old, and has programs that do not fit preschool children. The slogan and the main song of the channel is "Hop! To grow up in good hands" (Hebrew: הופ! לגדול בידיים טובות); the main song sung by Ariel Zilber and later by the channel's presenters. Ever since the channel's launch in February 2000, it broadcasts from 6:00 am to 8:00 pm, which is 15 hours daily. Since they changed the time slot by then, the channel broadcasts from 5:00 am to 11:00 pm Tel-Aviv Israeli time, which is now 18 hours daily.

The channel's logo is a red, yellow, green and blue kite. Idents between programs show other characters as well: a bird, a mouse, a puppy, a cat and previously, a fly, a spider, a clock, and a penguin. Another character that has been identified with the channel in the past is a purple spacecraft called "Tralalit".

In 2002, the channel got the rights from production company Sesame Workshop to produce and broadcast an Israeli adaptation based on the Sesame Street series. Entitled "Rechov Sumsum" (רחוב סומסום), Hop! Channel started to produce the series in 2006, up until 2016. Four seasons of Rechov Sumsum, along with a spin-off series titled Hop! I Know (הופ! אני יודע), were produced.

In 2006, Romania, in partnership with Israel, launched Boom Hop! on Boom TV, a local version of the channel in Romanian. The channel was closed in 2012.

Programming includes shows such as Strawberry Shortcake: Berry in the Big City and S.M.A.S.H!.

== International defunct channels ==
Active date	Country
November 11, 2006–January 1, 2012	Romania
