= List of animated feature films of 2009 =

This is a list of animated feature films first released in 2009.

== List ==
Title	Country	Director	Production company	Animation technique	Type	Notes	Release date	Duration
9	United States; Luxembourg	Shane Acker	Relativity Media; LuxAnimation; Tim Burton Productions	Computer			September 9, 2009	79 minutes
Acadieman vs le CMA 2009	Canada	Dano LeBlanc		Traditional			2009	78 minutes
Afro Samurai: Resurrection	Japan; United States	Fuminori Kizaki; Jamie Simone	Gonzo	Traditional			January 25, 2009	100 minutes
Agent Macaw: Shaken & Stirred; El Agente 00-P2	Mexico	Andrés Couturier M	Ánima Estudios	Flash			February 13, 2009	97 minutes
Alice's Birthday; День рождения Алисы (Den' rozhdeniya Alisy)	Russia	Sergey Seryogin	Master-film	Traditional			February 12, 2009	90 minutes
Animal channel	Spain	Maite Ruiz de Austri		Traditional			March 25, 2009 (Anima Basauri Festival) (premiere)	75 minutes
Alvin and the Chipmunks: The Squeakquel	United States	Betty Thomas	Fox 2000 Pictures; Regency Enterprises; Bagdasarian Company; Dune Entertainment	Computer / Live action	Theatrical		December 23, 2009	88 minutes
Go! Anpanman: Dadandan and the Twin Stars それいけ!アンパンマン だだんだんとふたごの星	Japan	Jun Kawagoe	Anpanman Production Committee; TMS Entertainment	Traditional			July 4, 2009	51 minutes
Another Egg and Chicken Movie; Otra Película de Huevos y un Pollo	Mexico	Gabriel Riva Palacio Alatriste; Rodolfo Riva Palacio Alatriste	Huevocartoon Producciones; Cinépolis Producciones	Traditional			March 20, 2009	100 minutes
Aliens in the Attic	United States	John Schultz	Dune Entertainment; Regency Enterprises; Josephson Entertainment	Computer / Live action			July 31, 2009	86 minutes
Arthur and the Revenge of Maltazard; Arthur et la vengeance de Maltazard	France	Luc Besson	EuropaCorp; TF1 Films Production; Apipoulaï Prod; Avalanche Productions; Canal+	Computer			December 2, 2009 (France); March 22, 2011 (United States)	93 minutes
Astro Boy	United States	David Bowers	Imagi Animation Studios	Computer			October 8, 2009 (Hong Kong); October 10, 2009 (Japan); October 23, 2009 (United States)	94 minutes
Barbie and the Three Musketeers	United States	William Lau	Rainmaker Entertainment	Computer	Direct-to-video		September 15, 2009	81 minutes
Barbie Thumbelina	United States	Conrad Helten	Rainmaker Entertainment	Computer	Direct-to-video		March 17, 2009	75 minutes
Baton バトン	Japan; United States	Ryuhei Kitamura	Rockwell Eyes; Tsuburaya Productions	Traditional	Direct-to-video		April 28, 2009 (Yokohama)	60 minutes
Bionicle: The Legend Reborn	United States	Mark Baldo	Tinseltown Toons; Threshold Animation Studios; The Lego Group	Computer	Direct-to-video		September 15, 2009	71 minutes
Boogie; Boogie, el aceitoso	Argentina	Gustavo Cova	Illusion Studios; Proceso	Flash			October 22, 2009	82 minutes
Bye-Bye Bin Laden	United States	Scott Sublett	San Jose State University	Traditional			March 28, 2009 (South Beach International Animation Festival) (premiere); February 18, 2010 (Beloit International Film Festival)	73 minutes
A Christmas Carol	United States	Robert Zemeckis	Walt Disney Pictures; ImageMovers Digital	Computer			November 3, 2009 (London); November 6, 2009 (United States)	96 minutes
Cloudy with a Chance of Meatballs	United States	Phil Lord and Christopher Miller	Sony Pictures Animation	Computer			September 12, 2009 (Los Angeles); September 18, 2009 (United States)	90 minutes
Coraline	United States	Henry Selick	Laika; Pandemonium Films	Stop-motion			February 5, 2009 (premiered); February 6, 2009; May 8, 2009 (United Kingdom)	100 minutes
Detective Conan: The Raven Chaser	Japan	Yasuichiro Yamamoto	TMS Entertainment	Traditional			April 18, 2009	111 minutes
The Dolphin: Story of a Dreamer; El Delfin: La Historia de un Soñador	Peru; Germany; Italy	Eduardo Schuldt	Dolphin Films; Passworld Unipersonale; Dreamin' Dolphin Film	Computer			October 6, 2009 (Buenos Aires) (premiere); October 8, 2009	86 minutes
Doraemon: The New Record of Nobita: Spaceblazer 映画ドラえもん 新・のび太の宇宙開拓史 (Doraemon: Shin Nobita no Uchū Kaitakushi)	Japan	Shigeo Koshi	Shin-Ei Animation	Traditional			March 7, 2009	102 minutes
Ed, Edd n Eddy's Big Picture Show	Canada; United States	Danny Antonucci	a.k.a. Cartoon	Traditional		Made for T.V. movie, Series finale	November 8, 2009	89 minutes
Eden of The East Compilation: Air Communication 東のエデン 総集編 Air Communication (Higashi no Eden Sōshū-hen Air Communication)	Japan	Kenji Kamiyama	Production I.G	Traditional			September 26, 2009	125 minutes
Eden of the East the Movie I: The King of Eden 東のエデン 劇場版I The King of Eden (Higashi no Eden Gekijōban I: The King of Eden)	Japan	Kenji Kamiyama	Production I.G	Traditional			November 28, 2009	85 minutes
Eleanor's Secret; Kérity, la maison des contes	France	Dominique Monféry	Gaumont Alphanim; La Fabrique; Lanterna Magica	Traditional			October 22, 2009 (Rome Film Festival); December 16, 2009 (France); August 24, 2014 (United States)	80 minutes
Eureka Seven: Good Night, Sleep Tight, Young Lovers 交響詩篇エウレカセブン ポケットが虹でいっぱい (Kōkyō Shihen Eureka Seven: Pocket ga Niji de Ippai)	Japan	Tomoki Kyoda	Bones	Traditional			April 25, 2009	115 minutes
Evangelion: 2.0 You Can (Not) Advance ヱヴァンゲリヲン新劇場版: 破 (Evangerion Shin Gekijōban: Ha)	Japan	Hideaki Anno, Masayuki, Kazuya Tsurumaki	Studio Khara	Traditional			June 27, 2009	108 minutes
Fantastic Mr. Fox	United States	Wes Anderson	20th Century Fox Animation; Indian Paintbrush; Regency Enterprises; American Empirical Pictures; 3 Mills Studios	Stop motion			October 14, 2009 London Film Festival; November 13, 2009 (United States)	87 minutes
First Squad ファーストスクワッド (Fāsuto sukuwadd); Пе́рвый отря́д (Perviy otryad)	Japan; Russia	Yoshiharu Ashino	Studio 4°C; Molot Entertainment Film Company	Traditional			May 13, 2009 (Cannes); October 15, 2009 (Russia)	73 minutes
Fresh Pretty Cure the Movie: The Kingdom of Toys has Lots of Secrets!? フレッシュプリキュア！おもちゃの国は秘密がいっぱい！？ (Fresh Precure! Omocha no Kuni wa Himitsu ga Ippai!?)	Japan	Junji Shimizu	Toei Animation	Traditional			October 31, 2009	71 minutes
Friends Forever; Mullewapp – Das große Kinoabenteuer der Freunde	Germany; France; Italy	Tony Loeser, Jesper Møller	MotionWorks	Traditional			July 23, 2009	77 minutes 72 minutes (Germany)
Futurama: Into the Wild Green Yonder	United States	Peter Avanzino	The Curiosity Company; 20th Century Fox Television	Traditional	Direct-to-video		February 23, 2009 (United Kingdom); February 24, 2009 (United States)	89 minutes
Garfield's Pet Force	United States; South Korea	Mark A.Z. Dippé; Kyung Ho Lee	Paws, Inc. The Animation Picture Company; Davis Entertainment	Computer	Direct-to-video		June 16, 2009	78 minutes
Geng: The Adventure Begins; Geng: Pengembaraan Bermula	Malaysia	Nizam Razak	Les' Copaque Production	Computer			February 12, 2009	90 minutes
Gladiformers 2 Gladiformers 2	Brazil	Marco Alemar	Vídeo Brinquedo	Computer	Direct-to-video		July 17, 2009	68 minutes
Green Lantern: First Flight	United States	Lauren Montgomery	Warner Bros. Animation; Warner Premiere; DC Comics; Telecom Animation Film (Animation services)	Traditional	Direct-to-video		July 28, 2009	77 minutes
Gurren Lagann the Movie –The Lights in the Sky Are Stars- 天元突破グレンラガン 螺巌篇 (Tengen Toppa Gurren Lagann: Ragan-hen)	Japan	Hiroyuki Imaishi	Gainax	Traditional			April 25, 2009	126 minutes
G-Force	United States	Hoyt H. Yeatman Jr.	Walt Disney Pictures; Jerry Bruckheimer Films	Computer / Live action			July 24, 2009	90 minutes
Copernicus' Star; Gwiazda Kopernika	Poland	Zdzisław Kudła; Andrzej Orzechowski	Studio Filmów Rysunkowych	Traditional			October 9, 2009	90 minutes
Happily N'Ever After 2: Snow White—Another Bite @ the Apple	United States; Germany	Steven E. Gordon; Boyd Kirkland	Kickstart Productions; Berlin Animation Film	Computer	Direct-to-video		December 18, 2008 (Australia); March 24, 2009 (United States)	75 minutes
The Happy Cricket and the Giant Bugs; O Grilo Feliz e os Insetos Gigantes	Brazil	Walbercy Ribas; Rafael Ribas	Start Desenhos Animados	Computer			January 9, 2009	80 minutes
The Haunted World of El Superbeasto	United States	Rob Zombie	Starz Media; Film Roman	Traditional	Direct-to-video		September 22, 2009	77 minutes
Hero of the Rails	United Kingdom	Greg Tiernan	HIT Entertainment	Computer	Direct-to-video		September 8, 2009 (US DVD); October 12, 2009 (UK DVD)	60 minutes
Hidden Treasure of Wompkee Wood	United States	Michael DeVitto	Deos Animation; MarVista Entertainment; Wompkees	Computer	Direct-to-video		May 2009	54 minutes
Hulk Vs	United States	Frank Paur; Sam Liu	Marvel Animation; Madhouse	Traditional	Direct-to-video		January 27, 2009	82 minutes
Ice Age: Dawn of the Dinosaurs	United States	Carlos Saldanha; Michael Thurmeier	Blue Sky Studios	Computer			July 1, 2009	94 minutes
In the Attic or Who Has a Birthday Today? Na půdě aneb Kdo má dneska narozeniny?	Czech Republic; Japan; France; Slovakia	Jiří Barta	At Armz; Česká Televize; Continental Film; Eurocine Films; Eurociné; Krátký Film Praha; Universal Production Partners (UPP); Bio Illusion	Stop motion			March 5, 2009 (Czech Republic)	75 minutes
The In the Night Garden Movie: Search for Igglepiggle; La película El jardín de los sueños: Búsqueda de Igglepiggle	United Kingdom	Anne Wood	Ragdoll	Traditional / Live-action			July 18, 2009	66 minutes
Jasper: Journey to the End of the World; Jasper und das Limonadenkomplott	Germany	Eckart Fingberg; Kay Delventhal	Amuse Films; Toons'N'Tales	Computer			October 2, 2008 (Hamburg); August 13, 2009 (Germany)	80 minutes
Khan Kluay 2 ก้านกล้วย (Kan Kluai)	Thailand	Taweelap Srivuthivong	Kantana Animation	Computer			March 26, 2009	95 minutes
Killer Bean Forever	United States	Jeff Lew	Killer Bean Studios	Computer			2008 (Toronto Film Festival); July 14, 2009	85 minutes
The King of Milu Deer 麋鹿王	China	Guo Weijiao	Zhonke Weiwo Digital Technology	Computer			September 29, 2009	
King of Thorn いばらの王 (Ibara no Ō)	Japan	Kazuyoshi Katayama	Kadokawa Pictures	Traditional			October 2009 (Sitges International Film Festival of Cataluna); May 1, 2010 (Japan)	120 minutes
Lascars	France	Emmanuel Klotz, Albert Pereira-Lazaro	Millimages	Traditional			June 17, 2009	96 minutes
Last War of Heavenloids and Akutoloids 天上人とアクト人 最後の戦い (Tenjō-nin to Akuto-nin Saigo no Tatakai)	Japan	Yoshiji Kigami	Kyoto Animation	Traditional			April 18, 2009	83 minutes
Laura's Star and the Mysterious Dragon Nian; Lauras Stern und der geheimnisvolle Drache Nian	Germany	Piet De Rycker; Thilo Graf Rothkirch	Rothkirch Cartoon Film; Torus	Computer			September 20, 2009 (Hamburg); September 24, 2009 (Germany)	75 minutes
LeapFrog: Let's Go to School	United States	Bob Nesler	Chris D'Angelo Productions; LeapFrog; Lionsgate	Traditional	Direct-to-video		August 18, 2009	32 minutes
Little Bee; Abelhinhas	Brazil	Everton Rodrigues	Vídeo Brinquedo	Computer	Direct-to-video		2009	55 minutes
Luke and Lucy: The Texas Rangers; Suske en Wiske: De Texas-Rakkers	Belgium; Luxembourg; Netherlands	Mark Mertens; Wim Bien	Skyline Entertainment; CoBo Fonds; AVRO; Studio Vandersteen; Standaard Uitgeverij; Cotoon Studio; Flanders Audiovisual Fund (VAF); LuxAnimation	Computer			July 21, 2009 (Belgium); July 23, 2009 (Netherlands); November 5, 2010 (United States)	86 minutes
Macross Frontier The Movie: The False Songstress マクロスF 虚空歌姫～イツワリノウタヒメ～ (Gekijōban Macross F: Itsuwari no)	Japan	Shoji Kawamori	Satelight	Traditional			November 21, 2009	120 minutes
Mai Mai Miracle マイマイ新子と千年の魔法 (Maimai Shinko to sen-nen no mahō)	Japan	Sunao Katabuchi	Madhouse	Traditional			November 21, 2009	93 minutes
Mary and Max	Australia	Adam Elliot	Screen Australia; Melodrama Pictures; Film Victoria; SBS Television Australia; Adirondack Pictures	Stop motion			January 15, 2009 (Sundance Film Festival); April 9, 2009 (Australia)	90 minutes
Masha and the Magic Nut; Наша Маша и волшебный орех (Nasha Masha i Volshebnyy orekh)	Russia	Egor Konchalovskiy	Amedia; Gala-Film	Computer			December 10, 2009	72 minutes
McDull, Kung Fu Kindergarten 麥兜响噹噹	Hong Kong	Brian Tse	Bliss Pictures Ltd.	Traditional			July 24, 2009	80 minutes
Metropia	Sweden; Denmark; Norway	Tarik Saleh	Atmo Media Network; Zentropa Entertainments	Computer			September 2, 2009 (Venice Film Festival); November 27, 2009 (Sweden)	86 minutes
Monsters vs. Aliens	United States	Conrad Vernon; Rob Letterman	DreamWorks Animation	Computer			March 27, 2009	94 minutes
MovieComic 4: Girls and Boys; Cine Gibi 4: Meninas e Meninos	Brazil	José Márcio Nicolosi	Maurcio de Sousa Produções	Flash	Direct-to-video		October 2, 2009	73 minutes
My Dog Tulip	United States	Paul Fierlinger	Norman Twain Productions	Traditional			June 10, 2009 (Annecy)	83 minutes
My Little Pony: Twinkle Wish Adventure	United States	John Grusd	SD Entertainment; Hasbro Entertainment	Traditional	Direct-to-video		October 13, 2009	44 minutes
Naruto Shippūden The Movie: Inheritors of the Will of Fire 劇場版 NARUTO-ナルト- 疾風伝 火の意志を継ぐ者 (Gekijōban Naruto Shippūden Hi no Ishi wo Tsugumono)	Japan	Masahiko Murata	Studio Pierrot	Traditional			August 1, 2009	96 minutes
Night at the Museum: Battle of the Smithsonian	United States	Shawn Levy	20th Century Fox; Dune Entertainment; 1492 Pictures; 21 Laps Entertainment	Computer / Live action	Theatrical		May 22, 2009	105 minutes
Nikté	Mexico	Ricardo Arnaiz	Animex Producciones	Traditional			December 18, 2009	93 minutes
Oblivion Island: Haruka and the Magic Mirror ホッタラケの島 〜遥と魔法の鏡〜 (Hottarake no Shima: Haruka to Mahō no Kagami)	Japan	Shinsuke Sato	Production I.G; Polygon Pictures	Traditional			August 22, 2009	100 minutes
Olives Dream; Zeytinin Hayali	Turkey		Ella Animation & Productions	Traditional			September 20, 2009	85 minutes
One Piece Film: Strong World ワンピースフィルム ストロングワールド Wan Pīsu Firumu: Sutorongu Wārudo	Japan	Munehisa Sakai	Toei Animation	Traditional			December 12, 2009	115 minutes
Pettson & Findus IV – Forget-Abilities; Pettson & Findus – Glömligheter	Sweden	Jørgen Lerdam, Anders Sørensen	A. Film, Studio Baestarts	Traditional			March 13, 2009	70 minutes
Planet 51	Spain; United Kingdom; United States	Jorge Blanco	Ilion Animation Studios; HandMade Films International	Computer			November 14, 2009 (Westwood); November 20, 2009 (United States); November 27, 2009 (Spain); December 4, 2009 (United Kingdom)	91 minutes
Pleasant Goat and Big Big Wolf: The Super Snail Adventure	China			Traditional			January 16, 2009 (Mainland China); August 27, 2009 (Hong Kong)	85 minutes
Ploddy the Police Car Makes a Splash	Norway	Rasmus A. Sivertsen	Neofilm AS; Qvisten Animation	Computer			December 25, 2009 (Oslo); January 8, 2010	74 minutes
Pokémon: Arceus and the Jewel of Life 劇場版ポケットモンスター ダイヤモンド&パール アルセウス 超克の時空へ (Gekijōban Poketto Monsutā Daiyamondo ando Pāru: Aruseusu Chōkoku no Jikū e)	Japan; United States	Kunihiko Yuyama	OLM, Inc.	Traditional			July 18, 2009	94 minutes
Port of Return	Taiwan	Jung-Kuei Chang	Spring House Entertainment Tech	Traditional			October 12, 2009 (Pusan International Film Festival)	81 minutes
Pocoyo & the Space Circus; El Show de Pocoyó: Pocoyó y El Circo Especial	Spain	Andy Yekes	Zinkia Entertainment	Computer			2009	24 minutes
Pretty Cure All Stars DX: Everyone's Friends – the Collection of Miracles! プリキュアオールスターズDX みんなともだちっ☆奇跡の全員大集合！ (Precure All Stars DX: Minna Tomodachi— Kiseki no Zenin Daishūgō)	Japan	Takashi Otsuka	Toei Animation	Traditional			March 20, 2009	70 minutes
The Pink Panther 2	United States	Harald Zwart	Metro-Goldwyn-Mayer Pictures; Columbia Pictures; Robert Simonds Company	Traditional / Live action			February 6, 2009	92 minutes
The Princess and the Frog	United States	Ron Clements; John Musker	Walt Disney Animation Studios	Traditional		Return of hand-drawn animated Walt Disney film since 2004's Home on the Range	November 25, 2009 (Los Angeles premiere); December 11, 2009	97 minutes
Princess Lillifee; Prinzessin Lillifee	Germany	Ansgar Niebuhr; Alan Simpson; Zhi-Jian Xu	Beta Film; Caligari Film- und Fernsehproduktions; WunderWerk	Traditional			March 26, 2009	70 minutes
The Prodigy	United States	Robert D. Hanna	Prevalent Entertainment	Computer			July 7, 2009	77 minutes
Professor Layton and the Eternal Diva レイトン教授と永遠の歌姫 (Reiton-kyōju to Eien no Utahime)	Japan	Masakazu Hashimoto	P.A. Works; OLM	Traditional			December 19, 2009	100 minutes
Redline; REDLINE (Reddorain)	Japan	Takeshi Koike	Madhouse	Traditional			August 14, 2009 (Locarno); October 9, 2010 (Japan)	102 minutes
The Romantic	United States	Michael Heneghan	The Triumphant School of the Apocalyptic Love	Traditional			2009	95 minutes
Room and a Half; Полторы комнаты, или Сентиментальное путешествие на родину (Poltory komnaty, ili Sentimentalnoye puteshestviye na rodinu)	Russia	Andrey Khrzhanovsky	School-Studio SHAR	Traditional			January 23, 2009 (International Film Festival Rotterdam); April 9, 2009 (Russian)	130 minutes
Scooby-Doo! and the Samurai Sword	United States	Christopher Berkeley	Warner Premiere; Warner Bros. Animation	Traditional	Direct-to-video		April 7, 2009	74 minutes
The Secret of Kells aka Brendan and the Secret of Kells	Ireland; France; Belgium	Tomm Moore; Nora Twomey	Les Armateurs; Vivi Film; Cartoon Saloon; France 2 Cinéma	Traditional / Flash			January 30, 2009 (Gérardmer Film Festival); February 11, 2009 (France/Belgium); March 3, 2009 (Ireland)	75 minutes
Space Battleship Yamato: Resurrection 宇宙戦艦ヤマト 復活篇 (Uchū Senkan Yamato: Fukkatsu Hen)	Japan	Yoshinobu Nishizaki	Enagio	Traditional			December 12, 2009	135 minutes 123 minutes (Director's Cut)
Storm Rider Clash of the Evils	China	Dante Lam	Puzzle Animation Studio; Shanghai Media Group	Traditional / Computer			September 15, 2008 (Hong Kong); July 19, 2009 (China)	98 minutes
The Story of Mr. Sorry	South Korea	Kwak In-Keun; Il-hyun Kim; Eun Mi-lee; Lee Hae-young; Lee Hae-young; Ji-na Ryu	CJ Entertainment	Traditional			March 12, 2009	65 minutes
Summer Wars サマーウォーズ (Samā Wōzu)	Japan	Mamoru Hosoda	Madhouse	Traditional			August 1, 2009	114 minutes
The Sun; El Sol	Argentina	Ayar Blasco	Crudofilms	Flash			November 14, 2009 (Mar del Plata Film Festival); April 8, 2010 (Buenos Aires International Festival of Independent Cinema)	72 minutes
Superman/Batman: Public Enemies	United States	Sam Liu	Warner Bros. Animation; Warner Premiere; DC Entertainment; Lotto Animation (Animation services)	Traditional	Direct-to-video		September 29, 2009	67 minutes
Tales of Vesperia: The First Strike テイルズ オブ ヴェスペリア 〜The First Strike〜 (Teiruzu obu Vesuperia ~The First Strike~)	Japan	Kenta Kamei	Production I.G	Traditional			October 3, 2009	110 minutes
Technotise: Edit & I	Serbia	Aleksa Gajić	Yodi Movie Craftsman; Black White 'N' Green	Traditional		First Serbian animated feature	September 28, 2009	90 minutes
Tinker Bell and the Lost Treasure	United States	Klay Hall	Disneytoon Studios	Computer			June 5, 2009 (Japan); October 27, 2009; February 15, 2010 (Hindi)	82 minutes
Totally Spies! The Movie; Totally Spies! Le film	France	Pascal Jardin	Marathon Media; Studio 37; Mikado Film; Groupe Un	Traditional			July 22, 2009	144 minutes
A Town Called Panic; Panique au village	Belgium; Luxembourg	Stéphane Aubier; Vincent Patar	La Parti Productions; Coproduction Office; Beast Animation; Gébéka Films; Les Films du Grognon; Made in Productions; Mélusine Productions; RTBF	Stop motion			May 21, 2009 (Cannes); June 17, 2009 (Belgium); October 28, 2009 (France)	76 minutes
Transformers: Revenge of the Fallen	United States	Michael Bay	DreamWorks Pictures; Paramount Pictures; Di Bonaventura Pictures; Hasbro	Computer / Live action			June 24, 2009	149 minutes
The True History of Puss 'N Boots; La Véritable Histoire du chat botté	France; Belgium; Switzerland	Jérôme Deschamps; Pascal Hérold; Macha Makeïeff	France 3 Cinéma; Umedia uFilm; Nexus Factory; Nadeo; Saga-Productions; MK2 Productions	Computer			April 1, 2009 (France & Belgium); May 11, 2011 (United States)	81 minutes
Up	United States	Pete Docter	Pixar Animation Studios	Computer			May 13, 2009 (Cannes); May 29, 2009	96 minutes
VeggieTales: Abe and the Amazing Promise	United States	John Wahba	Big Idea Productions	Computer	Direct-to-video		February 10, 2009 (TV); February 10, 2009 (DVD)	52 minutes
VeggieTales: Minnesota Cuke and the Search for Noah's Umbrella	United States	Mike Nawrocki; John Wahba	Big Idea Productions	Computer	Direct-to-video		August 4, 2009	50 minutes
VeggieTales: Saint Nicholas: A Story of Joyful Giving	United States	Brian K. Roberts	Big Idea Productions	Computer	Direct-to-video		October 6, 2009	45 minutes
The Velveteen Rabbit	United States	Michael Landon Jr.	Feature Films for Families; Family1 Films; Believe Pictures	Traditional			February 27, 2009	97 minutes
The Watercolor	Turkey	Cihat Hazardağlı		Traditional			November 13, 2009	84 minutes
What's Up?: Balloon to the rescue Voando Em Busca de Aventuras!	Brazil	Everton Rodrigues	Vídeo Brinquedo	Computer	Direct-to-video		2009	45 minutes
Włatcy móch: Ćmoki, czopki i mondzioły	Poland	Bartosz Kędzierski					February 13, 2009	92 minutes
Winnetoons, the Legend of Silver Lake; WinneToons – Die Legende vom Schatz im Silbersee	Germany; Belgium	Gert Ludewig	ASL; DeFamilieJanssen; Europool; Toon City Animation	Traditional			April 16, 2009	80 minutes
Wishology	United States	Butch Hartman; Ken Bruce; Michelle Bryan; Gary Conrad	Nickelodeon Animation Studio; Frederator Studios; Billionfold Inc.	Traditional / Computer	Television film trilogy	9th television special of The Fairly OddParents and 15th to 20th episodes of its 6th season (95th to 100th episodes of the series)	May 1—3, 2009	135 minutes (45 minutes per part)
Wonder Woman	United States	Lauren Montgomery	Warner Premiere; DC Comics; Warner Bros. Animation	Traditional	Direct-to-video		March 3, 2009	73 minutes
Yona Yona Penguin よなよなペンギン	Japan; France	Rintaro	Madhouse; Dynamo Pictures; Def2shoot; Storm Lion; Denis Friedman Productions	Computer			December 23, 2009 (Japan); February 24, 2011 (United States)	85 minutes

== Highest-grossing films ==
The following is a list of the 11 highest-grossing animated feature films first released in 2009.

Highest-grossing animated films of 2009
Rank	Title	Studio	Worldwide gross
1	Ice Age: Dawn of the Dinosaurs	Fox / Blue Sky Studios	$886,686,817
2	Up	Walt Disney Pictures / Pixar	$735,099,082
3	Monsters vs. Aliens	Paramount / DreamWorks Animation	$381,509,870
4	A Christmas Carol	Walt Disney Pictures / ImageMovers Digital	$325,286,646
5	The Princess and the Frog	Walt Disney Pictures	$270,997,378
6	Cloudy with a Chance of Meatballs	Sony / Sony Pictures Animation	$243,006,126
7	Coraline	Laika / Pandemonium	$124,596,398
8	Planet 51	Sony / Ilion Animation Studios / HandMade Films	$105,647,102
9	Pokémon: Arceus and the Jewel of Life	OLM, Inc.	$50,673,078
10	One Piece Film: Strong World	Toei Animation	$49,199,136
11	9	Focus Features	$48,559,999

== See also ==
- List of animated television series of 2009
