= 2009 in animation =

2009 in animation is an overview of notable events, including notable awards, list of films released, television show debuts and endings, and notable deaths.

== Events ==
=== January ===
- January 11: Total Drama's second season series Total Drama Action premieres on Teletoon. Season/series later premiered on Cartoon Network in the US on June 11th.
- January 15: Adam Eliot's Mary and Max premieres.
- January 16: Pleasant Goat and Big Big Wolf: The Super Snail Adventure is released, the first film based on the Pleasant Goat and Big Big Wolf TV series.
- January 18: The first episode of Masha and the Bear is broadcast.
- January 25: The Simpsons episode "Lisa the Drama Queen" premieres on Fox, this was the last episode to be produced in Standard-definition. It was seen by over 5.7 million viewers that night.
- January 30: During the Gérardmer Film Festival Tomm Moore's The Secret of Kells premiers.

=== February ===
- February 2: Season 3 of Upin & Ipin premiered on TV9.
- February 5: Henry Selick's Coraline, based on Neil Gaiman's eponymous novel, is first released.
- February 6: Futurama: Into the Wild Green Yonder, based on the TV series Futurama, premieres at the New York Comic Con; it would later be generally released on August 30.
- February 12: Sergey Seryogin's Alice's Birthday is released.
- February 13: Toon Disney and Jetix relaunched as Disney XD.
- February 15: The Simpsons episode "Take My Life, Please" premieres on Fox, this was the first episode to be produced in High-definition. It was seen by over 6.7 million viewers that night.
- February 18: Phineas and Ferb concludes its first season on Disney XD with the premiere of the episode "Unfair Science Fair Redux (Another Story)".
- February 19: Season 2 of Phineas and Ferb begins on Disney XD with the premiere of half-hour special "The Lake Nose Monster".
- February 22: 81st Academy Awards:
  - WALL-E wins the Academy Award for Best Animated Feature.
  - La Maison en Petits Cubes by Kunio Kato wins the Academy Award for Best Animated Short.
- February 23: Eddie White's The Cat Piano premiers, which features narration by Nick Cave.

=== March ===
- March 3: Lauren Montgomery's Wonder Woman is released direct-to-DVD to positive reviews.
- March 5: Jiří Barta's Toys in the Attic is released.
- March 11: Season 13 of South Park begins on Comedy Central with the premiere of the episode "The Ring". It was seen by just over 3.4 million viewers that night.
- March 17: The Simpsons episode "In the Name of the Grandfather" is first broadcast, in which the family travels to Ireland.
- March 27: Conrad Vernon and Rob Letterman's Monsters vs. Aliens premieres in theaters. It is the first DreamWorks Animation film to be released in 3D.
- March 28: The Penguins of Madagascar made its official premiere on Nickelodeon with the episodes "Launchtime/Haunted Habitat". Its premiere brought in a total of 6.1 million viewers.
- March 29: The Family Guy episode "Not All Dogs Go to Heaven" premieres on Fox. This episode features Brian coming out about being an Atheist to the rest of the family and town. The episode was seen by over 8.1 million viewers that night.

=== April ===
- April 1: The first episode of The Amazing Spiez! is broadcast, though it had aired on March 15 on Disney Channel (Asia) before.
- April 7: The Scooby-Doo direct-to-video film Scooby-Doo! and the Samurai Sword releases on DVD.
- April 20: The first episode of Fishtronaut is broadcast.

=== May ===
- May 1–3: The Fairly OddParents trilogy film series Wishology airs on Nickelodeon. It received mixed to positive attention.
- May 3: The last 5 episodes of Foster's Home for Imaginary Friends air on Cartoon Network.
- May 10: The Simpsons episode "Four Great Women and a Manicure" premieres on Fox, guest starring Jodie Foster.
- May 13–24: Up and A Town Called Panic premiere at the 2009 Cannes Film Festival.
- May 17:
  - The Simpsons concludes its 20th season on Fox with the episode "Coming to Homerica". It was seen by over 5.8 million viewers that night.
  - Family Guy concludes its seventh season on Fox with the episode "Peter's Progress". It was seen by over 7.3 million viewers that night.
  - American Dad! concludes its fifth season on Fox with the episode "Stan's Night Out". It was seen by over 5.6 million viewers that night.
- May 29: Up releases in theaters in the United States, it was the first Pixar film to be released in 3D.
- May 31: After more than 10 years on the air, Jay Jay the Jet Plane is removed from the PBS Kids schedule.

=== June ===
- June 7-9: Disney Channel and Disney XD renew Phineas and Ferb for a third season.
- June 10: Paul Fierlinger's My Dog Tulip premieres.
- June 17: Cartoon Network suspends the original animated programs as they instead launch the live-action block "CN Real". The block was cancelled the following year as it is declared a "bad promotion" on the network dedicated to cartoons.

=== July ===
- July 1: Blue Sky Studios releases Ice Age: Dawn of the Dinosaurs, directed by Carlos Saldanha. This was 20th Century Studios' first film to be released in 3D.
- July 2: Andrei Khrzhanovsky's Room and a Half is released.
- July 21: Luke and Lucy: The Texas Rangers is released, the first CGI-animated feature film made in Belgium. It is also the first animated film based on the Belgian comics series Suske en Wiske, and the most expensive Flemish movie of the time.
- July 22: Totally Spies! The Movie premiers, the first film based on the eponymous TV series.
- July 23: The Marvelous Misadventures of Flapjack concludes its first season on Cartoon Network with the episode "Tee Hee Tummy Tums".
- July 30: Season 2 of The Marvelous Misadventures of Flapjack premieres on Cartoon Network with the episodes "Jar She Blows!/Behind the Curtain".

=== August ===
- August 13: Cartoon Network greenlights two new original shows for its lineup, Regular Show & Horrorbots (which later got renamed as Robotomy).
- August 31: The first episode of Kabouter Wesley is broadcast.

=== September ===
- September 3: 66th Venice International Film Festival: Tarik Saleh's Metropia premieres.
- September 7: The first episodes of Dinosaur Train and Wibbly Pig both aired.
- September 8: Season 2 of The Mr. Men Show premieres on Cartoon Network with the episodes "Picnics/Driving".
- September 9: Shane Acker's 9 premieres.
- September 12: Phil Lord and Christopher Miller's Cloudy with a Chance of Meatballs makes its premiere at the Mann Village Theater.
- September 13: King of the Hill's original series finale "To Sirloin with Love" premieres on Fox, it was seen by over 6 million viewers that night.
  - Despite this being the final episode of the show's original run, 4 remaining episodes aired in syndication the following year.
- September 15: The first episode of Geronimo Stilton airs.
- September 17: The first episode of Archer airs on FX.
- September 18: Cloudy with a Chance of Meatballs releases in theaters in the United States, it is Sony Pictures Animation's first film to officially be released in 3D.
- September 22: Rob Zombie releases The Haunted World of El Superbeasto, based on his comic book of the same name.
- September 25: Turner Broadcasting System announced that they have greenlit their first new series from Cartoon Network Studios Europe for Cartoon Network, it being The Amazing World of Gumball.
- September 27:
  - Season 21 of The Simpsons begins on Fox with the premiere of the episode "Homer the Whopper". It was seen by just over 8.3 million viewers that night.
  - The first episode of The Cleveland Show, a spin-off of Family Guy revolving around Cleveland Brown, premiered on Fox. The show's premiere was seen by just over 9.5 million viewers that night.
  - Season 8 of Family Guy begins on Fox with the premiere of the episode "Road to the Multiverse". It was seen by just over 10.1 million viewers that night.
  - Season 6 of American Dad! begins on Fox with the premiere of the episode "In Country...Club". It was seen by over 7.1 million viewers that night.
- September 28: Nickelodeon rebrands with a new logo. Nicktoons Network shortens its name to Nicktoons. Noggin and The N are replaced by the Nick Jr. Channel and TeenNick (channels based on the Nick Jr. and TEENick blocks, respectively).
- September 29: The King of Milu Deer is released, the first Chinese CGI-animated film.

=== October ===
- October 2: The first episode of Kung Fu Dino Posse airs.
- October 5: The first episode of Les Mistigris (Lulu's Islands) is broadcast.
- October 8: Chowder concludes its second season on Cartoon Network with the premiere of the episode "Tofu-Town Showdown".
- October 12: The first episode of Fanboy & Chum Chum is broadcast as a preview; it would later officially premiere on November 6.
- October 14: Wes Anderson's stop-motion film Fantastic Mr. Fox, based on Roald Dahl's eponymous children's book, premieres at the London Film Festival.
- October 15: The 3rd & final season of Chowder begins on Cartoon Network with the premiere of the episode "Hands on a Big Mixer".
- October 26:
  - The first episode of Have a Laugh! airs.
  - The first episode of Sally Bollywood airs.

=== November ===
- November 3: Robert Zemeckis' A Christmas Carol, starring Jim Carrey as Ebenezer Scrooge, premieres.
- November 6: SpongeBob SquarePants celebrates its 10th anniversary with a television special titled SpongeBob's Truth or Square that premiered on Nickelodeon to mixed and negative reviews.
- November 8: Ed, Edd n Eddy's Big Picture Show premieres on Cartoon Network, the movie serves as the series finale to the show.
- November 9:
  - Glenn Martin, DDS was moved to air late nights on Nick@Nite due to complaints from parents after regarding the show's adult content, sparking controversy when it aired evenings after SpongeBob SquarePants.
  - Season 4 of Johnny Test begins on Cartoon Network with the premiere of the episode "Johnny's New Baby Sisters".
- November 14: Jorge Blanco's Planet 51 premieres.
- November 18: South Park concludes its 13th season on Comedy Central with the episode "Pee". It was seen by over 2.8 million viewers that night. This was the final episode to premiere in the 2000s.
- Specific date unknown: The first episode of The Samsonadzes was broadcast.

=== December ===
- December 11: The Princess and the Frog is released, directed by Ron Clements and John Musker, the first Walt Disney Company production with an African-American lead character. This marks Disney's first theatrical hand-drawn animated feature since Home on the Range in 2004.
- December 30: Little Nemo, Quasi at the Quackadero, The Red Book and Scratch and Crow are added to the National Film Registry.

=== Specific date unknown ===
- Michael P. Heneghan's The Romantic is released.
- Pebbles commercials, animated by Rick Reinert, broadcast during commercial breaks. These were Reinert's latest works, his last was Cupcake Pebbles commercial in 2010, before quietly quit working for advertisements after Post got sued for plagiarism against Hulk Hogan.

== Awards ==
- Academy Award for Best Animated Feature: WALL-E
- Academy Award for Best Animated Short: La Maison en Petits Cubes
- Animation Kobe Feature Film Award: WALL-E
- Annecy International Animated Film Festival Cristal du long métrage: Coraline and Mary and Max
- Annie Award for Best Animated Feature: Up
- Asia Pacific Screen Award for Best Animated Feature Film: Mary and Max
- BAFTA Award for Best Animated Film: Up
- European Film Award for Best Animated Film: Mia and the Migoo
- Goya Award for Best Animated Film: Planet 51
- Japan Academy Prize for Animation of the Year: Summer Wars
- Japan Media Arts Festival Animation Grand Prize: Summer Wars
- Mainichi Film Awards - Animation Grand Award: Summer Wars

== Films released ==
- January 9 - The Happy Cricket and the Giant Bugs (Brazil)
- January 16 - Pleasant Goat and Big Big Wolf: The Super Snail Adventure (China)
- January 25 - Afro Samurai: Resurrection (United States and Japan)
- January 27 - Hulk Vs (United States)
- February 6 - Coraline (United States)
- February 10 - VeggieTales: Abe and the Amazing Promise (United States)
- February 12:
  - Alice's Birthday (Russia)
  - Geng: The Adventure Begins (Malaysia)
- February 13:
  - Agent Macaw: Shaken & Stirred (Mexico)
  - Włatcy móch: Ćmoki, czopki i mondzioły (Poland)
- February 24 - Futurama: Into the Wild Green Yonder (United States)
- February 27 - The Velveteen Rabbit (United States)
- March 3:
  - The Secret of Kells (Ireland, Belgium, and France)
  - Wonder Woman (United States)
- March 5 - In the Attic or Who Has a Birthday Today? (Czech Republic)
- March 7 - Doraemon: The New Record of Nobita: Spaceblazer (Japan)
- March 12 - The Story of Mr. Sorry (South Korea)
- March 13 - Pettson & Findus IV – Forget-Abilities (Sweden)
- March 17 - Barbie Thumbelina (United States)
- March 20:
  - Another Egg and Chicken Movie (Mexico)
  - Pretty Cure All Stars DX: Everyone's Friends – the Collection of Miracles! (Japan)
- March 24 - Happily N'Ever After 2: Snow White—Another Bite @ the Apple (United States)
- March 25 - Animal Channel (Spain)
- March 26:
  - Khan Kluay 2 (Thailand)
  - Princess Lillifee (Germany)
- March 27 - Monsters vs. Aliens (United States)
- March 28 - Bye-Bye Bin Laden (United States)
- April 1 - The True History of Puss 'N Boots (France, Belgium, and Switzerland)
- April 7 - Scooby-Doo! and the Samurai Sword (United States)
- April 9:
  - Mary and Max (Australia)
  - Room and a Half (Russia)
- April 16 - Winnetoons, the Legend of Silver Lake (Germany and Belgium)
- April 18:
  - Detective Conan: The Raven Chaser (Japan)
  - Last War of Heavenloids and Akutoloids (Japan)
- April 25:
  - Eureka Seven: Good Night, Sleep Tight, Young Lovers (Japan)
  - Gurren Lagann the Movie –The Lights in the Sky Are Stars- (Japan)
- April 28 - Baton (United States and Japan)
- May - Hidden Treasure of Wompkee Wood (United States)
- May 1 - Battle for Terra (United States)
- May 29 - Up (United States)
- June 10 - My Dog Tulip (United States)
- June 16 - Garfield's Pet Force (United States and South Korea)
- June 17:
  - Lascars (France)
  - A Town Called Panic (Belgium and Luxembourg)
- June 27 - Evangelion: 2.0 You Can (Not) Advance (Japan)
- July 1 - Ice Age: Dawn of the Dinosaurs (United States)
- July 7 - The Prodigy (United States)
- July 14 - Killer Bean Forever (United States)
- July 17 - Gladiformers 2 (Brazil)
- July 18 - Pokémon: Arceus and the Jewel of Life (United States and Japan)
- July 19 - Storm Rider Clash of the Evils (China)
- July 21 - Luke and Lucy: The Texas Rangers (Belgium, Luxembourg, and Netherlands)
- July 22 - Totally Spies! The Movie (France)
- July 23 - Friends Forever (Germany, France, and Italy)
- July 24 - McDull, Kung Fu Kindergarten (Hong Kong)
- July 28 - Green Lantern: First Flight (United States)
- August 1:
  - Naruto Shippūden The Movie: Inheritors of the Will of Fire (Japan)
  - Summer Wars (Japan)
- August 4 - VeggieTales: Minnesota Cuke and the Search for Noah's Umbrella (United States)
- August 13 - Jasper: Journey to the End of the World (Germany)
- August 14 - Redline (Japan)
- August 18 - LeapFrog: Let's Go to School (United States)
- August 22 - Oblivion Island: Haruka and the Magic Mirror (Japan)
- September 8 - Hero of the Rails (United Kingdom)
- September 9 - 9 (United States and Luxembourg)
- September 15:
  - Barbie and the Three Musketeers (United States)
  - Bionicle: The Legend Reborn (United States)
- September 18 - Cloudy with a Chance of Meatballs (United States)
- September 20 - Olives Dream (Turkey)
- September 22 - The Haunted World of El Superbeasto (United States)
- September 24 - Laura's Star and the Mysterious Dragon Nian (Germany)
- September 26 - Eden of The East Compilation: Air Communication (Japan)
- September 28 - Technotise: Edit & I (Serbia)
- September 29:
  - The King of Milu Deer (China)
  - Superman/Batman: Public Enemies (United States)
- October - King of Thorn (Japan)
- October 3 - Tales of Vesperia: The First Strike (Japan)
- October 6 - VeggieTales: Saint Nicholas: A Story of Joyful Giving (United States)
- October 8:
  - Astro Boy (United States and Hong Kong)
  - The Dolphin: Story of a Dreamer (Peru)
- October 9 - Copernicus' Star (Poland)
- October 12 - Port of Return (Taiwan)
- October 13 - Twinkle Wish Adventure (United States)
- October 15 - First Squad (Japan and Russia)
- October 22 - Boogie (Argentina)
- October 27 - Tinker Bell and the Lost Treasure (United States)
- October 30 - The Apple & the Worm (Denmark and Sweden)
- October 31 - Fresh Pretty Cure the Movie: The Kingdom of Toys has Lots of Secrets!? (Japan)
- November 6 - A Christmas Carol (United States)
- November 8 - Ed, Edd n Eddy's Big Picture Show (United States)
- November 13:
  - Fantastic Mr. Fox (United States)
  - The Watercolor (Turkey)
- November 14 - The Sun (Argentina)
- November 20 - Planet 51 (United States, United Kingdom, and Spain)
- November 21:
  - Macross Frontier The Movie: The False Songstress (Japan)
  - Mai Mai Miracle (Japan)
- November 27 - Metropia (Sweden, Denmark, and Norway)
- November 28 - Eden of the East the Movie I: The King of Eden (Japan)
- December 2 - Arthur and the Revenge of Maltazard (France)
- December 10 - Masha and the Magic Nut (Russia)
- December 11 - The Princess and the Frog (United States)
- December 12:
  - One Piece Film: Strong World (Japan)
  - Space Battleship Yamato: Resurrection (Japan)
- December 16 - Eleanor's Secret (France)
- December 19 - Professor Layton and the Eternal Diva (Japan)
- December 23 - Yona Yona Penguin (Japan and France)
- December 25 - Pelle Politibil går i vannet (Norway)
- Specific date unknown:
  - Little Bee (Brazil)
  - Pocoyo And The Space Circus (Spain)
  - The Romantic (United States)
  - What's Up?: Balloon to the Rescue (Brazil)

== Television series debuts ==
Date	Title	Channel	Year
January 3	Huntik: Secrets & Seekers	TheCW4Kids, Nicktoons, Rai	2009–2011
January 23	Wolverine and the X-Men	Nicktoons	2009
January 26	Olivia	Nick Jr., Channel 5	2009–2013
February 7	RollBots	TheCW4Kids	2009
February 13	Jimmy Two-Shoes	Disney XD, Teletoon	2009–2011
March 5	League of Super Evil	YTV	2009–2012
March 15	The Amazing Spiez!	TF1, Teletoon, Disney Channel Asia	2009–2012
April 4	Special Agent Oso	Playhouse Disney	2009–2012
April 6	Timmy Time	CBeebies	2009–2012
April 19	Sit Down, Shut Up	Fox	2009
April 20	Fishtronaut	Discovery Kids (Latin America)	2009–2015
April 24	Iron Man: Armored Adventures	Nicktoons, France 2, France 4	2009–2012
May 9	Pokémon: DP Galactic Battles	Cartoon Network	2009–2010
June 15	DJ & the Fro	MTV	2009
July 16	Stoked	Teletoon	2009–2013
August 17	Glenn Martin, DDS	Nick at Nite	2009–2011
August 29	Hot Wheels Battle Force 5	Cartoon Network, Teletoon	2009–2011
September 7	Dinosaur Train	PBS Kids	2009–2020
September 12	Angelina Ballerina: The Next Steps	PBS Kids	2009–2010
September 17	Archer	FX, FXX	2009–2023
September 19	Noonbory and the Super Seven	Cookie Jar TV, EBS	2009
September 19	Pearlie	YTV, Network Ten	2009–2011
September 27	The Cleveland Show	Fox	2009–2013
September 27	Popzilla	MTV	2009
September 27	Titan Maximum	Adult Swim	2009
October 5	Casper's Scare School	Cartoon Network	2009–2012
October 5	Jungle Junction	Playhouse Disney	2009–2012
October 12	Fanboy & Chum Chum	Nickelodeon	2009–2012
October 26	Have a Laugh!	Disney Channel	2009–2012
November 2	The Garfield Show	Cartoon Network	2009–2016
November 9	Guess with Jess	CBeebies	2009–2013

== Television series endings ==
Date	Title	Channel	Year	Notes
January 18	Viva Piñata	TheCW4Kids, YTV	2006–2009	Cancelled
January 23	Slacker Cats	ABC Family	2007–2009	Cancelled
January 24	Tak and the Power of Juju	Nickelodeon	2007–2009	Cancelled
January 25	The Drinky Crow Show	Adult Swim	2008–2009	Cancelled
January 27	Rick & Steve: The Happiest Gay Couple in All the World	Logo	2007–2009	Cancelled
February 28	Sushi Pack	CBS	2007–2009	Cancelled
March 1	Spaceballs: The Animated Series	G4	2008–2009	Cancelled
March 1	Wunderkind Little Amadeus	PBS Kids	2008–2009	Ended
March 30	The Replacements	Disney Channel	2006–2009	Ended
April 18	Yin Yang Yo!	Jetix, Disney XD	2006–2009	Ended
April 22	Toot & Puddle	Noggin	2008–2009	Ended
May 2	My Life as a Teenage Robot	Nicktoons Network	2003–2009	Ended
May 2	Pokémon: DP Battle Dimension	Cartoon Network	2008–2009	Ended
May 3	Foster's Home for Imaginary Friends	Cartoon Network	2004–2009	Ended
May 23	Transformers: Animated	Cartoon Network	2007–2009	Ended
June 28	Three Delivery	Nicktoons Network	2008–2009	Ended
June 29	World of Quest	Kids' WB	2008–2009	Ended
July 2	DJ and the Fro	MTV	2009	Ended
August 7	The Goode Family	ABC	2009	Ended
September 6	Animalia	PBS Kids Go!	2008–2009	Ended
September 18	Pinky Dinky Doo	Noggin	2005–2009	Ended
October 16	Popzilla	MTV	2009	Ended
October 19	The Mr. Men Show	Cartoon Network	2008–2009	Ended
November 8	Ed, Edd n Eddy	Cartoon Network	1999–2009	Ended
November 14	Can You Teach My Alligator Manners?	Playhouse Disney	2008–2009	Cancelled
November 18	The Spectacular Spider-Man	TheCW4Kids, Disney XD	2008–2009	Cancelled
November 21	Teenage Mutant Ninja Turtles	TheCW4Kids	2003–2009	Ended
November 21	Sit Down, Shut Up	Fox	2009	Cancelled
November 22	Titan Maximum	Adult Swim	2009	Cancelled
November 24	RollBots	TheCW4Kids	2009	Cancelled
November 29	Wolverine and the X-Men	Nicktoons	2009	Cancelled
December 12	Noonbory and the Super 7	Cookie Jar TV, EBS	2009	Cancelled
December 20	Random! Cartoons	Nicktoons Network	2008–2009	Cancelled
December 22	Little Einsteins	Playhouse Disney	2005–2009	Ended

== Television season premieres ==
Date	Title	Season	Channel
January 11	Total Drama	2	Teletoon (Note: Season later premiered in the US on Cartoon Network on June 11th.)
February 19	Phineas and Ferb	2	Disney XD (Note: Season premiered on Disney Channel on March 27th.)
February 25	Back at the Barnyard	2	Nickelodeon
March 11	South Park	13	Comedy Central
March 29	Aqua Teen Hunger Force	6	Adult Swim
July 6	The Fairly OddParents	7	Nickelodeon
July 19	SpongeBob SquarePants	7	Nickelodeon
July 30	The Marvelous Misadventures of Flapjack	2	Cartoon Network
September 11	Ben 10: Alien Force	3	Cartoon Network
September 27	American Dad!	6	Fox
September 27	Family Guy	8	Fox
September 27	The Simpsons	21	Fox
October 15	Chowder	3	Cartoon Network
November 9	Johnny Test (Note: Revived after initially ending on Kids' WB.)	4	Cartoon Network
December 13	Aqua Teen Hunger Force	7	Adult Swim

== Television season finales ==
Date	Title	Season	Channel
February 18	Phineas and Ferb	1	Disney XD (Note: Season concluded on Disney Channel on March 20th.)
February 24	Back at the Barnyard	1	Nickelodeon
March 27	Ben 10: Alien Force	2	Cartoon Network
May 17	American Dad!	5	Fox
May 17	Family Guy	7	Fox
May 17	The Simpsons	20	Fox
May 31	Aqua Teen Hunger Force	6	Adult Swim
July 19	SpongeBob SquarePants	5	Nickelodeon
July 23	The Marvelous Misadventures of Flapjack	1	Cartoon Network
August 12	The Fairly OddParents	6	Nickelodeon
August 30	Futurama	5	Comedy Central
October 8	Chowder	2	Cartoon Network
November 18	South Park	13	Comedy Central
December 6	Robot Chicken	4	Adult Swim

== Births ==
=== February ===
- February 22: Archie Yates, English child actor (voice of Sprout in Wolfboy and the Everything Factory, Kappa in Oni: Thunder God's Tale, Jojo Potato in the Amphibia episode "Newts in Tights").

=== June ===
- June 4: Antonio Raul Corbo, American child actor (voice of young SpongeBob SquarePants in The SpongeBob Movie: Sponge on the Run, continued voice of Oscar Peltzer in Summer Camp Island).

=== July ===
- July 18: Jahzir Bruno, American child actor (voice of Clyde McBride in season 6 of The Loud House and The Casagrandes episode "Phantom Freakout").

=== October ===
- October 8: Gordon Cormier, Canadian actor (voice of Luis in Team Zenko Go, Mitchell Peterson in Ready Jet Go! Space Camp).

=== November ===
- November 5: Trinity Bliss, American actress (voice of Rita Raspberry in Princess Power, Marzipan in Glisten and the Merry Mission).
- November 10: Christian Convery, American-Canadian child actor (voice of Fregley in Diary of a Wimpy Kid, Chase in PAW Patrol: The Mighty Movie).

== Deaths ==
=== January ===
- January 13: Patrick McGoohan, Irish-American actor, director, screenwriter and producer (voice of Billy Bones in Treasure Planet, Number Six in The Simpsons episode "The Computer Wore Menace Shoes"), dies at age 80.
- January 14: Ricardo Montalbán, Mexican actor (voice of Armando Guitierrez in Freakazoid!, Señor Senior Sr. in Kim Possible, the Head of Council in The Ant Bully, Gone Juan in The Spooktacular New Adventures of Casper, Vartkes in the Buzz Lightyear of Star Command episode "Lone Wolf", El Encantador in the Dora the Explorer episode "The Missing Piece", the Cow in the Family Guy episode "McStroke", General Juanito Pequeño in the American Dad! episode "Moon Over Isla Island"), dies at age 88.
- January 23: Hisayuki Toriumi, Japanese animator (Tatsunoko Production, Sunrise, Studio Pierrot), and film director and producer (Science Ninja Team Gatchaman), screenwriter and novelist, dies at age 67.
- January 27: John Updike, American novelist, poet, short-story writer, art critic and literary critic (voiced himself in The Simpsons episode "Insane Clown Poppy"), dies from lung cancer at age 76.

=== February ===
- February 4: Lux Interior, American singer (voice of Bird Brains Lead Singer in SpongeBob SquarePants, Rayo X, Tarzan Eightball and Goth Boy in Los Campeones de la Lucha Libre), dies from aortic dissection at age 62.
- February 5: Albert Barillé, Polish-French animator, screenwriter and film producer (Procidis, Once Upon a Time...), dies at age 88.
- February 7: Blossom Dearie, American jazz singer and pianist (Schoolhouse Rock!), dies at age 84.
- February 13: Johnny Hawksworth, English musician and composer (wrote the theme song for Roobarb), dies at age 85.

=== March ===
- March 10: Jack Grimes, American actor (voice of Jimmy Olsen in The New Adventures of Superman, Sparky and Chim-Chim in Speed Racer), dies at age 82.
- March 14: Millard Kaufman, American screenwriter (co-creator of Mr. Magoo), dies at age 92.
- March 16: Jack Lawrence, American songwriter (Walt Disney Animation Studios), dies at age 96.
- March 19: Paul Angelis, English actor (voice of George Harrison, Ringo Starr, and the Chief Blue Meanie in Yellow Submarine), dies at age 66.

=== April ===
- April 25: Bea Arthur, American actress and comedian (voice of Femputer in the Futurama episode "Amazon Women in the Mood"), dies from lung cancer at age 86.

=== May ===
- May 4: Dom DeLuise, American actor (voice of Jeremy in The Secret of NIMH, Tiger in An American Tail, Fagin in Oliver & Company, Itchy Itchiford in All Dogs Go to Heaven, Stanley in A Troll in Central Park, Koosalagoopagoop in Dexter's Laboratory), dies at age 75.
- May 6: Vincent Davis, Australian-American animator (Fred Wolf Films, Gallavants, The Wuzzles), storyboard artist (DIC Entertainment), character designer (The Mouse and His Child), lip sync artist (Camp Candy), sheet timer (Fluppy Dogs, DuckTales, DIC Entertainment, The Mask, Life with Louie, Warner Bros. Animation, Holly Hobbie & Friends), art director (The Real Ghostbusters), production designer (The Mouse and His Child), writer (Cow and Chicken, Grim & Evil), director (Fred Wolf Films, The Little Clowns of Happytown, DuckTales, Captain Planet and the Planeteers, Film Roman) and producer (Garfield and Friends, Cow and Chicken, I Am Weasel, Grim & Evil), dies at age 65.
- May 7: Linda Dangcil, American actress (voice of Carmen Alonso / Raya in Jem, Homeless Woman in the Static Shock episode "Frozen Out", additional voices in A Pup Named Scooby-Doo), dies from throat cancer at age 67.
- May 19: Wayne Allwine, American actor (voice of Mickey Mouse from 1977 to 2009), dies at age 62.
- May 21: Joan Alexander, American actress (voice of Lois Lane in Superman), dies at age 94.

=== June ===
- June 3:
  - David Carradine, American actor (voice of Mandrax in Captain Simian & the Space Monkeys, Chief Wulisso in An American Tail: The Treasure of Manhattan Island, Nava in Balto II: Wolf Quest, Mr. Snerz in Hair High, Clockwork in Danny Phantom, Lo Pei in the Jackie Chan Adventures episode "The Warrior Incarnate", Junichiro Hill in the King of the Hill episode "Returning Japanese"), dies from erotic asphyxiation at age 72.
  - Koko Taylor, American singer (voiced herself in the Arthur episode "Big Horns George"), dies from gastrointestinal bleeding at age 80.
- June 9: Dave Simons, American comic book artist, animator and storyboard artist (Marvel Productions, Spiral Zone, Teenage Mutant Ninja Turtles, DIC Entertainment, Conan the Adventurer, Captain Planet and the Planeteers, Universal Cartoon Studios, Gargoyles, X-Men, Street Fighter: the Animated Series, Extreme Ghostbusters, Men in Black: The Series, Courage the Cowardly Dog, Butt-Ugly Martians, The Zula Patrol, Maya & Miguel, Kappa Mikey), dies at age 54.
- June 20: Jaime Diaz, Argentine-born American animator (Warner Bros. Cartoons, Hanna-Barbera, Ruby-Spears Enterprises), director (Duckman, The Fairly OddParents, ChalkZone) and sheet timer (Klasky-Csupo, Jumanji, Dora the Explorer, Danger Rangers, American Dad!, Curious George), dies at age 72.
- June 23: Ed McMahon, American announcer, game show host, comedian, actor, singer and combat aviator (voice of Engineer's Henchman in the Bruno the Kid episode "Bullet Train", Governor #1, Eugene Oregon and Beaver #5 in the I Am Weasel episode "I Am Ambassador", Announcer in The Angry Beavers episode "I Dare You", Tug Boat Captain Hero in the Higglytown Heroes episode "Ship Ahoy!", himself in the Pinky and the Brain episode "The Pinky and the Brain Reunion Special", The Simpsons episode "Treehouse of Horror IX", the Family Guy episode "When You Wish Upon a Weinstein", and the Duck Dodgers episode "Back to the Academy"), dies at age 86.
- June 25:
  - Michael Jackson, American singer, songwriter and dancer (voice of Leon Kompowsky in The Simpsons episode "Stark Raving Dad"), dies from cardiac arrest at age 50.
  - Farrah Fawcett, American actress (voice of Faucet in The Brave Little Toaster Goes to Mars, herself in the Johnny Bravo episode "Johnny Meets Farrah Fawcett"), dies from anal cancer at age 62.
- June 28: Fred Travalena, American entertainer (voice of Bogey Orangutan in Shirt Tales, Julius Caesar in Histeria!, King Ethelred in Dragon's Lair, William Dalton in Lucky Luke, Fice/Gokin in Gallavants), dies at age 66.

=== July ===
- July 6: Alfons Figueras, Spanish animator and comics artist (MGM animation, RKO Radio Network, Hispano Graphic Films), dies at age 86.
- July 14: Dallas McKennon, American voice actor (voice of Inspector Willoughby and Buzz Buzzard in Woody Woodpecker, Gumby and other characters in Gumby, The Professor at the Zoo, Toughy the Bulldog, Pedro the Chihuahua and The Hyena in Lady and the Tramp, Diablo and Vernon in Sleeping Beauty, The Fox and one of the Penguins in Mary Poppins, Max in How the Grinch Stole Christmas, Archie Andrews, Hot Dog and Mr. Weatherbee in The Archie Show), dies at age 89.
- July 17: Walter Cronkite, American broadcast journalist (voice of Captain Neweyes in We're Back! A Dinosaur's Story, Benjamin Franklin in Liberty's Kids), dies from cerebrovascular disease at age 92.
- July 21:
  - Heinz Edelmann, German graphic designer, illustrator, animator, cartoonist and comics artist (Yellow Submarine), dies from heart disease at age 75.
  - Yoshinori Kanada, Japanese animator (Birth, worked for Hayao Miyazaki), dies from a heart attack at age 57.
- July 22: John Ryan, English comics artist and animator (Captain Pugwash), dies at age 88.

=== August ===
- August 15: Virginia Davis, American actress (portrayed Alice in Alice Comedies), dies at age 90.
- August 25: Ted Kennedy, American lawyer and politician (guest starred in the Fetch! with Ruff Ruffman episode "Mr. Ruffman Goes to Washington"), dies from brain cancer at age 77.

=== September ===
- September 2: Tibor Kristóf, Hungarian actor (dub voice of Grigori Rasputin in Anastasia, Cookie in Atlantis: The Lost Empire, Doc Hudson in Cars, Zeus in Hercules, Señor Senior Sr. in Kim Possible, Scar in The Lion King, Henry J. Waternoose in Monsters, Inc., Lex Luthor in Superman: The Animated Series, Shredder in Teenage Mutant Ninja Turtles, Slinky Dog in the Toy Story franchise), dies at age 67.
- September 11: Yoshito Usui, Japanese manga artist (creator of Crayon Shin-chan), dies in a mountain climbing accident at age 51.
- September 14:
  - Henry Gibson, American actor (voice of Wilbur in Charlotte's Web, Eleroo in The Wuzzles, Dr. Applecheek in Tom and Jerry: The Movie, Lord Pain in The Grim Adventures of Billy & Mandy), dies at age 73.
  - Patrick Swayze, American actor, dancer, choreographer, singer, songwriter and film producer (voice of Cash in The Fox and the Hound 2), dies from pancreatic cancer at age 57.
- September 24: Robert Sahakyants, Armenian animator and film director (The Lesson), dies at age 59.

=== October ===
- October 14: Lou Albano, Italian-American wrestler and actor (voice of Mario in The Super Mario Bros. Super Show!), dies from a heart attack at age 76.
- October 20:
  - Attila Dargay, Hungarian animator, film director and comics artist (Mattie the Goose-boy, Vuk, Szaffi), dies at age 82.
  - Sultan Pepper, American television writer (CatDog, The Angry Beavers, Crashbox), dies at age 47.
- October 22: Soupy Sales, American comedian, actor, radio/television personality and jazz aficionado (voice of the title character in the Donkey Kong segment of Saturday Supercade), dies from cancer at age 83.

=== November ===
- November 3: Carl Ballantine, American magician, comedian, and actor (voice of Al G. Swindler in Garfield and Friends, Lenny Luntz in Spider-Man episode "Sins of the Fathers Chapter 13: Goblin War", Huska in the Freakazoid! episode "Lawn Gnomes: Chapter IV – Fun in the Sun"), dies at age 92.

=== December ===
- December 16: Roy E. Disney, American businessman (The Walt Disney Company, voiced himself in the Mickey Mouse Works episode "Mickey's Mix Up"), dies from stomach cancer at age 79.
- December 20:
  - Arnold Stang, American actor (voice of the title character in Top Cat) dies at age 91.
  - Brittany Murphy, American actress and singer (voice of Luanne Platter in King of the Hill, Tank in Pepper Ann, Gloria in Happy Feet, Colleen O'Hallahan in the Futurama episode "The Beast with a Billion Backs"), dies at age 32.
- December 30: Dana Landsberg, American animator, writer and designer (Disney Television Animation), dies at age 45.

== See also ==
- 2009 in anime
