= 2009 in anime =

Events in 2009 in anime.

== Accolades ==
At the Mainichi Film Awards, Summer Wars won the Animation Film Award and Denshin-Bashira Elemi no Koi won the Ōfuji Noburō Award. Summer Wars also won the Japan Academy Prize for Animation of the Year. Internationally, The Sky Crawlers, Summer Wars and First Squad were nominated for the Asia Pacific Screen Award for Best Animated Feature Film.

== Releases ==
=== Films ===
A list of anime that debuted in theaters between January 1 and December 31, 2009.

Release date	Title	Studio	Director	Running time (minutes)	Alternate title	Ref
January 16	Pleasant Goat and Big Big Wolf: The Super Snail Adventure	Creative Power Entertaining	Choo Sung Pong James; William Kan; Chen Hui Yan; Tan Shujun	85	Yukaina yagi to ōkina ōkina ōkami: Maiagaru	
January 17	Soukou Kihei Votoms: Pailsen Files Movie	The Answer Studio	Ryousuke Takahashi	118	Sōkō kihei botomuzu pēruzen fairuzu gekijō-ban	
January 25	Afro Samurai: Resurrection	Gonzo	Fuminori Kizaki	100	Afuro samurai Resurrection	
January 31	Chocolate Underground the Movie	Production I.G; Trans Arts	Takayuki Hamana	87	Chokorēto andāguraundo ~ bokura no chiyokorēto sensō ~	
March 7	Doraemon: The Record of Nobita's Spaceblazer	Shin-Ei Animation	Kōzō Kusuba (chief); Shigeo Koshi	98	Eiga Doraemon shin nobita no uchū kaitakushi	
March 7	Keroro Gunso the Super Movie 4: Gekishin Dragon Warriors	Sunrise	Junichi Satō (chief); Susumu Yamaguchi	78	Chō gekijō-ban keroro gunsō gekishin doragon'uoriāzu de arimasu!	
March 14	Kara no Kyoukai Remix: Gate of Seventh Heaven	ufotable	Hikaru Kondo; Sae Yoshikawa; Yūichi Terao	61	Sora no kyōkai Remix - Gate of seventh hebun -	
March 20	Precure All Stars Movie DX: Minna Tomodachi☆Kiseki no Zenin Daishuugou!	Toei Animation	Takashi Otsuka	70	Eiga purikyua ōru sutāzu DX min'na tomodachi ~tsu☆ kiseki no zen'in dai shūgō!	
April 18	Detective Conan: The Raven Chaser	Tokyo Movie Shinsha	Yasuichiro Yamamoto	111	Meitantei konan shikkoku no cheisā	
April 18	Crayon Shin-chan: Roar! Kasukabe Animal Kingdom	Shin-Ei Animation	Akira Shigino	96	Kureyon shin-chan otakebe! Kasukabe yasei ōkoku	
April 18	Munto Movie	Kyoto Animation	Yoshiji Kigami	90	Tenjōbito to akutobito saigo no tatakai	
April 22	Gurren Lagann: The Lights in the Sky are Stars	Gainax	Hiroyuki Imaishi	125	Gekijō-ban tengan toppa guren ragan ragan-hen	
April 25	Eureka Seven: Pocketful of Rainbows	Bones; Kinema Citrus	Tomoki Kyoda (chief); Hiroshi Haraguchi	115	Kōkyōshihen eureka sebun poketto ga niji de ippai	
April 28	Baton	Titmouse	Ryuhei Kitamura	65	Baton	
May 9	Pattenlai! ~A Water Story of the Southern Islands~!	Mushi Production	Noboru Ishiguro	90	Pattenrai!! ~ Minami no shima no mizu monogatari ~	
May 13	First Squad: The Moment of Truth	Studio 4°C	Yoshiharu Ashino	73	Fāsuto sukuwaddo	
June 13	Musashi: The Dream of the Last Samurai	Production I.G	Mizuho Nishikubo	72	Miyamoto musashi ― futaken ni haseru yume ―	
July 11	The Asylum Session	CoMix Wave Films	Tact Aoki	65	Ajīru sesshon	
July 18	Pokémon: Arceus and the Jewel of Life	OLM	Kunihiko Yuyama	94	Poketto monsutā daiyamondo & pāru aruseusu chōkoku no jikūhe	
July 27	Evangelion: 2.0 You Can (Not) Advance	Khara	Hideaki Anno (chief); Kazuya Tsurumaki (Co-Director); Masayuki	112	Wevuangeriwon shin gekijō-ban: Yabu	
July 28	Cencoroll	Anime Innovation Tokyo; Aniplex	Atsuya Uki	26	Senkorōru	
August 1	Naruto Shippuden the Movie: The Will of Fire	Pierrot	Masahiko Murata	95	Naruto - shippuden hi no ishi o tsugu mono	
August 1	Summer Wars	Madhouse	Mamoru Hosoda	114	Samāu~ōzu	
August 8	The Garden of Sinners: A Study in Murder – Part 2	ufotable	Shinsuke Takizawa	121	Gekijō-ban sora no ryōiki the Garden of sinners dai 7-shō `satsujin sōsa (kōhen)'	
August 14	Redline	Madhouse	Takeshi Koike	102	Reddo rain	
August 15	Mai-Mai Miracle	Madhouse	Sunao Katabuchi	95	Mai mai shinko to Chitose no mahō	
August 22	Oblivion Island: Haruka and the Magic Mirror	Polygon Pictures; Production I.G	Akio Nishizawa	98	Hottarake no shima ~ Haruka to mahō no kagami ~	
August 22	Symphony in August	WAO World	Shinsuke Satō	112	8 Tsuki no shinfonī ― Shibuya 2002 ~ 2003	
September 12	Yona Yona Penguin	Madhouse	Rintarō	87	Yona yona pengin	
September 19	Duel Masters: Lunatic God Saga	Shogakukan-Shueisha Productions	Waruo Suzuki (chief); Keidai Hattori	71	Gekijō-ban deyueru masutāzu kokugatsu no shintei	
September 26	Eden of The East Compilation: Air Communication; Higashi no Eden Recap	Production I.G	Kenji Kamiyama	123	Higashi no eden sōshūhen Air komyunikēshon	
October 3	Tales of Vesperia: The First Strike	Production I.G	Kanta Kamei	110	Teiruzu obu vuesuperia	
October 9	King of Thorn	Sunrise	Kazuyoshi Katayama	110	Ibara no ō	
October 16	Tailenders	Picograph	Makoto Ōta; Masaru Kawahara; Mebae; Nao Sasaki	27	Teiruendāzu	
October 17	The Rebirth of Buddha	Group TAC	Takaaki Ishiyama	114	Budda saitan	
October 31	Fresh Pretty Cure!: The Kingdom of Toys has Lots of Secrets!?	Toei Animation	Junji Shimizu	70	Eiga furesshu purikyua! Omocha no kuni wa himitsu ga ippai!?	
November 21	Macross Frontier: The False Songstress	8bit; Satelight	Shōji Kawamori	119	Gekijō-ban makurosu efu kokū utahime ~ itsuwari nō tahime ~	
November 28	Eden of The East: The King of Eden	Production I.G	Kenji Kamiyama	82	Higashi no eden gekijō-ban I The King of eden	
December 12	One Piece Film: Strong World	Toei Animation	Munehisa Sakai	115	Wan pīsu firumu sutorongu wārudo	
December 12	Space Battleship Yamato Resurrection	Enagio	Takeshi Shirato; Yoshinobu Nishizaki	135	Uchū senkan yamato fukkatsu-hen	
December 19	Professor Layton and the Eternal Diva	OLM; P.A. Works	Masakazu Hashimoto	99	Reiton kyōju to eien no uta-hime	

=== Television series ===
A list of anime television series that debuted between January 1 and December 31, 2009.

First run start and end dates	Title	Episodes	Studio(s)	Director(s)	Alternate title	Ref
January 1 – March 26	Corpse Princess: Kuro	12	feel.; Gainax	Masahiko Murata	Shitai	
January 3 – March 28	Maria Watches Over Us Season 4	13	Studio Deen	Toshiyuki Kato	Maria-sama ga miteru 〜 4 th 〜	
January 4 – March 22	Maria Holic	12	Shaft	Akiyuki Shinbo; Yukihiro Miyamoto	Maria† horikku	
January 4 – March 29	Akikan!	12	Brain's Base	Yuji Himaki	Akikan!	
January 4 – March 29	White Album	13	Seven Arcs	Akira Yoshimura; Taizo Yoshida	Howaito arubamu	
January 5 – March 30	Minami-ke: Okaeri	13	asread.	Kei Oikawa	Minami ke okaeri	
January 6 – March 24	Viper's Creed	12	AIC Spirits; Digital Frontier	Shinji Aramaki (chief); Hiroyuki Kanbe	Vuaipāzu kurīdo	
January 6 – March 31	Natsume's Book of Friends Season 2	13	Sunrise	Takahiro Omori	Zoku natsume yūjinchō	
January 6 – June 30	The Girl Who Leapt Through Space	26	Brain's Base	Masakazu Obara	Uchū o kakeru shōjo	
January 7 – July 1	Hajime no Ippo: New Challenger	26	Madhouse	Jun Shishido	Hajime no ippo shin shirīzu	
January 9 – March 27	Samurai Harem	12	AIC	Rion Kujo	Asu no yoichi	
January 9 – March 27	The Tower of Druaga: The Sword of Uruk	12	Gonzo	Koichi Chigira	Doruāga no tō ~ the Sword of URUK ~	
January 9 – June 19	Kurokami: The Animation	23	Sunrise	Tsuneo Kobayashi	Kurokami The Animation	
January 10 – March 28	Birdy the Mighty: Decode (season 2)	12	A-1 Pictures	Kazuki Akane	Tetsuwan bādī DECODE: 02	
January 10 – June 27	Major S5	25	SynergySP	Riki Fukushima	Mejā	
January 10 – December 26	The Beast Player Erin	50	Production I.G; Trans Arts	Takayuki Hamana	Kemono no sōja erin	
January 11 – June 21	Koukaku no Regios	24	Zexcs	Itsuro Kawasaki	Kōkaku no regiosu	
January 11 – June 25	Examurai Sengoku	24	TMS Entertainment	Yoshio Takeuchi	Eguzamurai sengoku	
January 12 – March 30	Rideback	12	Madhouse	Atsushi Takahashi	Raidobakku	
January 12 – April 6	Slayers Evolution-R	13	J.C.Staff	Takashi Watanabe	Sureiyāzu eboryūshon - R	
January 14 – March 11	Sora o Miageru Shōjo no Hitomi ni Utsuru Sekai	9	Kyoto Animation	Yoshiji Kigami	Sora wo miageru shōjo no hitomi ni utsuru sekai	
January 16 – March 27	Genji Monogatari Sennenki	11	Tezuka Productions; TMS Entertainment	Osamu Dezaki	Genji monogatari Chitose Genji	
February 1 – January 30, 2010	Fresh PreCure!	50	Toei Animation	Junji Shimizu; Akifumi Zako	Furesshu purikyua!	
March 30 – September 24	Chi's New Address	104	Madhouse	Mitsuyuki Masuhara	Chīzu suīto hōmu atarashī o uchi	
March 30 – March 22, 2013	Cookin' Idol Ai! Mai! Main!	305	Studio Deen	Hiroshi Watanabe	Kukkin'aidoru ai! Mai! Main!	
March 31 – March 23, 2010	Marie & Gali	40	Toei Animation	Kōhei Kureta; Yukio Kaizawa	Marī & garī	
April 1 – March 25, 2012	Mainichi Kaasan	142	Dongwoo A&E; Gallop; TYO Animations	Mitsuru Hongo	Mainichi kāsan	
April 2 – June 18	Queen's Blade: The Exiled Virgin	12	Arms	Kinji Yoshimoto	Kuīnzu bureido rurō no senshi	
April 2 – June 18	Sengoku Basara: Samurai Kings	12	Production I.G	Itsuro Kawasaki	Sengoku basara	
April 2 – June 25	Asura Cryin'	13	Seven Arcs	Keizō Kusakawa	Asura kurain	
April 3 – June 26	K-On!	13	Kyoto Animation	Naoko Yamada	Ke ion!	
April 3 – September 25	Pandora Hearts	25	Xebec	Takao Kato	Pandora hātsu	
April 3 – September 25	Phantom: Requiem for the Phantom	26	Bee Train	Kōichi Mashimo	Phantom 〜Requiem for the Phantom〜	
April 3 – October 2	Basquash!	26	Satelight	Hidekazu Sato; Shin Itagaki	Basukasshu!	
April 3 – February 19, 2010	Higepiyo	39	Kinema Citrus	Atsushi Takeyama	Hi-ge piyo, higepiyo	
April 4 – September 19	Hayate the Combat Butler!!	25	J.C.Staff	Yoshiaki Iwasaki	Hayate no gotoku!!	
April 4 – September 26	Mazinger Edition Z: The Impact!	26	Bee Media; Code	Yasuhiro Imagawa	Z majingā; ma majingā shōgeki! Z-hen	
April 4 – September 26	Slap-up Party: Arad Senki	26	Gonzo	Lee Jin-Hyung; Takahiro Ikezoe	Arado senki ~ surappu-appu pātī ~	
April 4 – March 27, 2010	Gokujō!! Mecha Mote Iinchō	51	Shogakukan Music & Digital Entertainment	Harume Kosaka	Gokujō! ! Mecha mote iinchō	
April 5 – June 21	Shinkyoku Sōkai Polyphonica Crimson S	12	Diomedéa	Toshimasa Suzuki	Shinkyoku sōkai porifonika crimsonS	
April 5 – September 27	Guin Saga	26	Satelight	Atsushi Wakabayashi	Guin sāga	
April 5 – September 27	Valkyria Chronicles	26	A-1 Pictures	Yasutaka Yamamoto	Senjō no vuarukyuria	
April 5 – December 27	Kon'nichiwa Anne: Before Green Gables	39	Nippon Animation	Katsuyoshi Yatabe	Kon'nichiwa An ~ Before Green Gables	
April 5 – February 14, 2010	Hanasakeru Seishōnen	39	Pierrot	Chiaki Kon; Hajime Kamegaki	Hanasakeru seishōnen	
April 5 – March 28, 2010	Beyblade: Metal Fusion	51	Tatsunoko Production	Kunihisa Sugishima	Metarufaito beiburēdo	
April 5 – March 28, 2010	Cross Game	50	SynergySP	Osamu Sekita	Kurosu gēmu	
April 5 – March 28, 2010	Jewelpet	52	Studio Comet	Nanako Sasaki	Juerupetto	
April 5 – July 4, 2010	Fullmetal Alchemist: Brotherhood	64	Bones	Yasuhiro Irie	Hagane no renkinjutsushi: FULLMETAL ALCHEMIST	
April 5 – March 27, 2011	Dragon Ball Z Kai	97	Toei Animation	Yasuhiro Nowatari	Doragon bōru aratame	
April 6 – June 22	Tayutama: Kiss on my Deity	12	SILVER LINK.	Keitaro Motonaga	Tayutama - Kiss on my Deity -	
April 6 – June 29	Natsu no Arashi!	13	Shaft	Shin Ōnuma (Chief); Akiyuki Shinbo	Natsu no arashi	
April 6 – September 14	Shangri-La	24	Gonzo	Makoto Bessho	Shanguri ra	
April 6 – September 28	Saki	25	Gonzo; Picture Magic	Manabu Ono	Saki - Saki -	
April 6 – September 28	Tears to Tiara	26	White Fox	Tomoki Kobayashi	Tiāzu tou tiara	
April 7 – September 22	07-Ghost	25	Studio Deen	Yoshihiro Takamoto	Sebun gōsuto	
April 7 – September 29	Sugarbunnies: Fleur	26	Asahi Production	Hiroshi Kugimiya	Shugābanīzu furūru	
April 8 – September 30	Sōten Kōro	26	Madhouse	Toyoo Ashida (Chief); Tsuneo Tominaga	Kūro	
April 9 – June 25	Ristorante Paradiso	11	David Production	Mitsuko Kase	Risutorante paradīzo	
April 10 – June 19	Eden of The East	11	Production I.G	Kenji Kamiyama	Higashi no eden	
April 12 – June 28	First Love Limited	12	J.C.Staff	Yoshiki Yamakawa	Hatsukoi gentei.	
May 22 – September 11	The Melancholy of Haruhi Suzumiya	14	Kyoto Animation	Tatsuya Ishihara; Yutaka Yamamoto	Suzumiya haruhi no yūutsu	
June 6 – September 26	Weiß Survive	16	Studio Hibari	Iku Suzuki	Vuaisu savuaivu	
June 25 – September 10	Fight Ippatsu! Jūden-chan!!	12	Studio Hibari	Shinichiro Kimura	Faito ippatsu! Jūden-chan!!	
June 25 – September 17	Umi Monogatari	12	Zexcs	Yuu Kou; Junichi Sato	Umi monogatari ~ anata ga ite kureta koto ~	
July 2 – September 10	Sweet Blue Flowers	11	J.C.Staff	Ken'ichi Kasai	Aoi hana	
July 2 – December 24	Umineko When They Cry	26	Studio Deen	Chiaki Kon	Umineko no naku koro ni	
July 3 – September 25	Taishō Baseball Girls	12	J.C.Staff	Takashi Ikehata	Taishō yakyū musume.	
July 3 – December 11	Needless	24	Madhouse	Masayuki Sakoi	Nīdoresu	
July 3 – June 25, 2010	Bakemonogatari	15	Shaft	Akiyuki Shinbo; Tatsuya Oishi	Bakemonogatari	
July 4 – September 26	Canaan	13	P.A. Works	Masahiro Ando	CANAAN	
July 4 – March 27, 2010	Element Hunters	39	Heewon Entertainment; NHK Enterprises	Han Pyo Hong; Yoshiaki Okumura	Eremento hantā	
July 5 – September 27	(Zan) Sayonara, Zetsubou-Sensei	13	Shaft	Akiyuki Shinbo	Zan Sayonara zetsubō-sensei	
July 5 – June 26, 2010	Kuruneko	50	DAX Production	Akitaro Daichi	Kuruneko	
July 6 – September 21	Princess Lover!	12	GoHands	Hiromitsu Kanazawa	Purinsesu rabā!	
July 6 – September 28	Kanamemo	13	feel.	Shigehito Takayanagi	Kaname mo	
July 7 – September 22	GA Geijutsuka Art Design Class	12	AIC PLUS+	Hiroaki Sakurai	GA geijutsu-ka āto dezain kurasu	
July 7 – September 22	Sora no Manimani	12	Studio Comet	Shinji Takamatsu	Chū no manimani	
July 9 – September 24	Spice and Wolf II	12	Brain's Base; Marvy Jack	Takeo Takahashi	Ōkami to kōshinryō II	
July 10 – September 18	Tokyo Magnitude 8.0	11	Bones; Kinema Citrus	Masaki Tachibana	Tōkyō magunichūdo 8. 0	
July 12 – September 27	Modern Magic Made Simple	12	Nomad	Yasuhiro Kuroda	Yoku wakaru gendai mahō	
September 13 – September 5, 2010	Battle Spirits: Shounen Gekiha Dan	50	Sunrise	Akira Nishimori	Batoru supirittsu shōnen geki ha dan	
September 24 – December 10	Queen's Blade: Inheritor of the Throne	12	Arms	Kinji Yoshimoto	Kuīnzu bureido gyokuza o tsugu mono	
October 1 – December 24	Asura Cryin' (season 2)	13	Seven Arcs	Keizō Kusakawa	Asura kurain 2	
October 2 – December 18	Kämpfer	12	Nomad	Yasuhiro Kuroda	Kenpufā	
October 2 – December 18	Nyan Koi!	12	AIC	Keiichiro Kawaguchi	Nyan koi!	
October 2 – April 2, 2010	Tatakau Shisho: The Book of Bantorra	27	David Production	Toshiya Shinohara	Tatakau shisho The bukku of Bantorra	
October 3 – December 19	The Sacred Blacksmith	12	Manglobe	Masamitsu Hidaka	Seiken no katanakaji (burakkusumisu)	
October 3 – December 19	Student Council's Discretion	12	Studio Deen	Takuya Satō	Seitokai no ichizon	
October 3 – December 24	White Album (season 2)	13	Seven Arcs	Taizō Yoshida	Howaito arubamu dai 2-ki	
October 3 – March 20, 2010	A Certain Scientific Railgun	24	J.C.Staff	Tatsuyuki Nagai	Toaru kagaku no rērugan	
October 3 – March 27, 2010	Astro Fighter Sunred (Season 2)	26	AIC ASTA	Seiji Kishi (Chief); Takehiko Matsumoto	Tentai senshi Sanreddo	
October 3 – March 27, 2010	Shugo Chara! Party!	25	Satelight	Kenji Yasuda	Shugo kyara! Pātī!	
October 3 – March 27, 2010	Tegami Bachi	25	Pierrot Plus	Akira Iwanaga	Tegamibachi	
October 4 – March 30, 2010	Inuyasha: The Final Act	26	Sunrise	Yasunao Aoki	Inuyasha kanketsu-hen	
October 4 – September 26, 2010	Yumeiro Patissiere	50	Studio Hibari	Iku Suzuki	Yumeiro patishiēru	
October 5 – December 21	Shin Koihime Musō	12	Doga Kobo	Nobuaki Nakanishi	Ma kohime† musō ~ otome ryōran ☆ Sangokushi engi ~	
October 5 – December 28	Heaven's Lost Property	13	AIC ASTA	Hisashi Saitō	Sora no otoshi mono	
October 5 – December 28	Miracle Train: Ōedo-sen e Yōkoso	13	Yumeta Company	Kenichi Kasai	Mirakuru ☆ torein 〜 ōedo-sen e yōkoso 〜	
October 5 – December 28	Natsu no Arashi! Akinai-chū	13	Shaft	Shin Ōnuma; Ken'ichi Ishikura	Natsu no arashi shunkafuyu-chū	
October 5 – September 20, 2010	Anyamaru Tantei Kiruminzuu	50	Satelight	Soichi Masui	Anyamaru tantei kiruminzuu	
October 6 – December 22	Haruka Nogizaka's Secret Purezza	12	Diomedéa	Munenori Nawa	Nogizaka haruka no himitsu pyaarettsua ♪	
October 6 – March 23, 2010	Kobato	24	Madhouse	Mitsuyuki Masuhara	Koba to	
October 7 – December 23	11eyes: Tsumi to Batsu to Aganai no Shōjo	12	Doga Kobo	Masami Shimoda	11 Eyes irebun'aizu	
October 7 – March 31, 2010	Kimi ni Todoke	25	Production I.G	Hiro Kaburagi	Kimi ni todoke	
October 8 – December 31	Whispered Words	13	AIC	Eiji Suganuma	Sasameki koto	
October 9 – December 25	Darker than Black: Gemini of the Meteor	12	Bones	Tensai Okamura	Dākā zan burakku ryūsei no futago	
October 11 – December 27	Aoi Bungaku Series	12	Madhouse	Atsuko Ishizuka; Morio Asaka; Ryosuke Nakamura; Shigeyuki Miya; Tetsuro Araki	Aoi bungaku shirīzu	
October 12 – September 3, 2012	Tamagotchi!	143	OLM Digital	Jōji Shimura	Tamagotchi!	
October 12 – March 30, 2013	Fairy Tail	175	A-1 Pictures; Satelight	Shinji Ishihira	Fearī teiru	
October 13 – June 8, 2010	Kaidan Restaurant	23	Toei Animation	Yoko Ikeda	Kaidan resutoran	
October 13 – June 29, 2010	Stitch! The Mischievous Alien's Great Adventure	29	Madhouse	Masami Hata	Sutitchi!~ Itazura eirian no dai bōken ~	
October 15 – December 24	Kūchū Buranko	11	Toei Animation	Kenji Nakamura	Kūchū buranko	
October 16 – March 26, 2010	Kiddy Girl-and	24	Satelight	Keiji Gotoh	Kidi gārando	
October 17 – May 1, 2010	Winter Sonata	26	KeyEast; REALTHING; Studio Comet	Yoon Suk-ho	Fuyu no sonata	
December 5 – March 27, 2010	Weiß Survive R	12	Studio Hibari	Kenji Seto	Vuaisu savuaivu R	
December 21 – December 25	Hipira-kun	10	Sunrise	Shinji Kimura	Hipira-kun	

=== Original net animations ===
A list of original net animations that debuted between January 1 and December 31, 2009.

First run start and end dates	Title	Episodes	Studio	Director	Alternate title	Ref
January 24 – March 5, 2010	Hetalia: Axis Powers	52	Studio Deen	Bob Shirohata	Hetaria Axis Powers	
February 13 – May 8	Nyorōn Churuya-san	13	Kyoto Animation	Yasuhiro Takemoto	Ni ~yoro ̄ n ☆ churuyasan	
February 14 – May 8	The Melancholy of Haruhi-chan Suzumiya	25	Kyoto Animation	Yasuhiro Takemoto	Suzumiya haruhi-chan'no yūutsu	
April 5 – May 20	Kigurumikku V3	3	AIC ASTA	Hisashi Saito	Ki guru mikku ☆ V 3	
July 1 – September 25	Umi Monogatari: Seeing Amamiko Island with Kanon	13	Zexcs		Umi monogatari natsuoto to iku ten Mikojima	
November 7 – February 16, 2010	Halo Legends	8	Bee Train; Bones; Production I.G; Studio 4°C; Toei Animation	Frank O'Connor (chief); Daisuke Nishio; Hideki Futamura; Hiroshi Yamazaki; Kōichi Mashimo; Kōji Sawai; Mamoru Oshii; Shinji Aramaki; Tomoki Kyoda; Toshiyuki Kanno; Yasushi Muraki	Heirō rejenzu	

=== Original video animations ===
A list of original video animations that debuted between January 1 and December 31, 2009.

First run start and end dates	Title	Episodes	Studio	Director	Alternate title	Ref
January 23 – March 25	Strawberry Marshmallow Encore	2	Daume	Takuya Satō	Ichigo mashimaro encore	
February 4 – December 4	Denpa teki na Kanojo	2	Brain's Base	Mamoru Kanbe	Denpa teki na kanojo	
February 12	Street Fighter IV: The Ties That Bind	1	Studio 4°C	Jirō Kanai	Sutorīto faitā IV aratanaru kizuna	
February 17 – June 23	xxxHOLiC Shunmuki	2	Production I.G	Tsutomu Mizushima	XxxHOLiC haru no yume	
February 20 – July 24	Kodomo no Jikan: Ni Gakki	3	Diomedéa	Eiji Suganuma	Kodomo no jikan 2 gakki	
February 25 – August 21	Higurashi no Naku Koro ni Rei	5	Studio Deen	Toshifumi Kawase	Higurashi no naku koro ni rei	
March 6	Hayate no Gotoku!!: Atsu ga Natsuize - Mizugi-hen!	1	J.C.Staff	Yoshiaki Iwasaki	Hayate no gotoku! ! Atsu ga Natsu i ze mizugi-hen!	
March 17 – May 15	Tsubasa Spring Thunder Chronicles	2	Production I.G	Shunsuke Tada	Tsubasa shunraiki	
April 1	Koihime†Musou: Gunyuu, Seitoukaichou no Za wo Neratte Aiarasou no Koto - Ato, Porori mo Aru yo!	1	Doga Kobo		Kohime† musō gun'yū, seito kaichō no za o neratte aiarasou no koto ~ ato, porori mo aru yo!~	
April 3 – April 2, 2010	To Love-Ru	6	Xebec	Takao Kato	To LOVEru - tora buru -	
April 16	Final Fantasy VII: Advent Children Complete	1	Square Enix Visual Works	Tetsuya Nomura	Fainaru fantajī VII adobento chirudoren konpurīto	
April 16	Final Fantasy VII: On the Way to a Smile - Episode: Denzel	1	A-1 Pictures	Shinji Ishihira	Denzeru o chūshin to shita orijinaru anime	
April 18	Detective Conan Magic File 3: Shinichi and Ran - Memories of Mahjong Tiles and Tanabata	1	TMS Entertainment	Yasuichiro Yamamoto	Meitantei konan Magic File 3: Shin'ichi to ran mājanhai to tanabata no omoide	
April 24	Issho ni Training: Training with Hinako	1	Studio Hibari	Iku Suzuki	Issho ni toreningu	
April 24 – June 26	Cobra The Animation: Time Drive	2	Magic Bus	Buichi Terasawa; Kenichi Maejima	Kobura THE animēshon taimu doraibu	
April 24 – October 7	To Heart 2 AD Plus	2	Chaos Project	Junichi Sakata	ToHeart2 adplus	
April 30	Spice and Wolf II: The Wolf and the Amber Melancholy	1	Brain's Base; Marvy Jack	Takeo Takahashi	Ōkami to kōshinryō II ōkami to kohakushoku no yūutsu	
April 30	Toradora! Recap	1	J.C.Staff		Tora dora pōtaburu!	
May 19 – July 17	Dogs: Bullets & Carnage	4	David Production	Tatsuya Abe	Dogguzu/ barettsu & kāneiji	
May 22 – May 26, 2010	Tenchi Muyo! War on Geminar	13	AIC Spirits; BeSTACK	Toshifumi Kawase	Isekai no seikishi monogatari	
May 26 – September 25	The Prince of Tennis: Another Story - Messages From Past and Future	4	M.S.C	Shunsuke Tada	Tenisu no ōjisama ovua anazā sutōrī ~ kako to mirai no messēji	
June 5 – June 23, 2010	Utawarerumono	3	Chaos Project	Kenichiro Katsura	Ovua utawarerumono	
June 17	Detective Conan OVA 09: The Stranger in 10 Years...	1	TMS Entertainment	Kōjin Ochi	Meitantei konan ~ 10-nen-go no sutorenjā~	
June 23	Minami-ke: Betsubara	1	asread.	Kei Oikawa	Minami ke betsu bara	
June 24 – April 21, 2010	Saint Seiya: The Lost Canvas	13	TMS Entertainment	Osamu Nabeshima	Seitōshi seiya THE rosuto CANVAS meiōsei no shinwa	
July 6 – December 22	AIKa ZERO	3	Studio Fantasia	Noriyasu Yamauchi	AIKa ZERO	
July 22	Tetsuwan Birdy Decode: The Cipher	1	A-1 Pictures	Kazuki Akane	Tetsuwan bādī DECODE - THE saifa -	
July 24	Code Geass: Hangyaku no Lelouch R2 Special Edition - Zero Requiem	1	Sunrise	Goro Taniguchi	Kōdo giasu hangyaku no rurūshu R 2 supesharu edishon Zero rekuiemu	
September 17 – August 17, 2010	Mahō Sensei Negima!: Mō Hitotsu no Sekai	5	Shaft; Studio Pastoral	Akiyuki Shinbo	Mahō sensei negima ~ mō hitotsu no sekai ~	
October 2	TO	2	Oxybot	Fumihiko Sori	Toū	
October 5 – October 12	Kanokon: Manatsu no Daishanikusai	2	Xebec	Atsushi Ōtsuki	Kanokon ~ manatsu no dai shanikusai ~	
October 6	Kyou no 5 no 2: Takarabako	1	Xebec	Tsuyoshi Nagasawa	Kyō no go no ni takarabako	
October 8	Hyakko Extra	1	Nippon Animation	Michio Fukuda	Hyakko ekusutora	
October 23	Akikan! OVA	1	Brain's Base	Yuji Himaki	Akikan! Kan ippatsu! ? Onsen panikku	
October 23	Kemono to Chat	1	Indeprox	Yūji Umoto	Kemono to chatto	
October 23	Shoujo Fight: Norainu-tachi no Odekake	1	Production I.G	Shunsuke Tada	Shōjo faito norainu-tachi no o dekake	
October 23 – September 29, 2010	Shakugan no Shana S	4	J.C.Staff	Takashi Watanabe	Shakugan'no shana esu	
October 27 – February 23, 2010	Mobile Suit Gundam 00 Special Edition	3	Sunrise	Seiji Mizushima	Kidō senshi Gandamu 00 supesharu edishon	
November 17 – February 17, 2010	Zan Sayonara Zetsubou Sensei Bangaichi	2	Shaft	Akiyuki Simbo	Zan Sayonara zetsubō-sensei bangaichi	
December 3	Tokimeki Memorial 4 OVA	1	Asahi Production		Tokimeki memoriaru 4 orijinaru animēshon - hajimari no faindā	
December 18	Aki Sora	1	Hoods Entertainment	Takeo Takahashi	Autumn Sky	
December 25	Kanojo × Kanojo × Kanojo	1	Studio Eromatick	Kōsuke Murayama	Kanojo x Kanojo x Kanojo: Sanshimai to no Dokidoki Kyoudou Seikatsu	
December 26	"Bungaku Shoujo" Kyou no Oyatsu: Hatsukoi	1	Production I.G	Shunsuke Tada	"Bungaku shōjo" kyōnōyatsu 〜 hatsukoi 〜	
December 31	Kowarekake no Orgel	1	Electromagnetic Wave	Keiichiro Kawaguchi	Koware kake no orugōru	
	Stretta The Animation					
	Mizugi Kanojo Animation					
	15 Bishoujo Hyouryuuki					
	Triangle Blue					
	Ayatsuri Haramase DreamNote					
	Fault!!					
	Binkan Athlete					
	Mama Puri					
	Jinkou Shoujo Henshin Sex Android					
	Issho ni H Shiyo!					
	Natsumushi The Animation					
	Kimihagu					
	Cartagra Tsuki Gurui no Yamai					
	Oni chichi					
	Samayou Midara na Lunatics					

== See also ==
- 2009 in animation
