= Yu Ying Xia =

Yu Ying Xia could refer to:

- Yisa Yu, Chinese singer, born Yu Yingxia
- Xia Yu-Ying, Chinese pool player
