= The Happy Cricket =

2001 film by Walbercy Ribas

- Directed by: Walbercy Ribas
- Written by: Walbercy Ribas
- Produced by: Juliana Ribas; Cleber Redondo; Francisco D. Lourenço
- Starring: See below
- Music by: Ruriá Duprat
- Production company: Start Desenhos Animados
- Distributed by: Hoyts General Cinema (Brazil); Tapeworm Video Distributors (United States)
- Release date: 20 July 2001
- Running time: 80 minutes
- Country: Brazil
- Language: Portuguese
- Budget: R$4 million

The Happy Cricket (Portuguese: O Grilo Feliz) is a 2001 Brazilian animated fantasy film directed by Walbercy Ribas.

== Plot ==
Christopher is a music-loving cricket who spends his days playing his magic stringless guitar for his friends. But, his peace is interrupted when the tyrannical monitor lizard, King Wartlord, bans music. Making matters worse, Linda the Night Star falls from the sky. Making matters worse, Wartlord, having mistaken the star for a diamond, is also searching for her. Thus, it's up to Christopher and his friends to rescue the Night Star and stop Wartlord.

== Production ==
The title character was first seen in local commercials for Sharp Electronics in the 1980s. The film spent over 20 years in development, and 30 months in production.

The team of approximately 70 illustrators, indenters, and colorists drew around 375,600 frames and 201,600 layouts that where later placed in the digital coloring phase using Silicon Graphics software, including mixing the use of CGI.

The film was transferred onto Exabyte to Record tapes and transferation of 118,080 files of the 82 minutes of film onto the 35MM film recording boards that were made at Cinesite in London.

The English-language dub is dedicated to one of its voice actors, the late Bob Papenbrook.

== Sequel ==
In early 2009, 20th Century Fox released a CGI sequel, O Grilo Feliz e os Insetos Gigantes (The Happy Cricket and the Giant Bugs).

== Cast ==
=== Original version ===
- Vagner Fagundes - Grilo
- Araken Saldanha - Maledeto
- Régis Monteiro - Faz Tudo
- Fátima Noya - Bituquinho
- Letícia Quinto - Juliana
- Nelson Machado - Sapo 1
- Renato Master - Sapo 2
- Antonio Moreno - Sapo 3
- Camila Bullara - Pouco Grilo
- Jorge Barcellos - Caracol velho / Geral
- Emerson Caperbat - Pai
- José Soares Maya - Tucano
- Isaura Gomes - Saranha
- Rita de Almeida - Caracolino
- Marli Bortoletto - Bacaninha
- Rodrigo Andreatto - Rafael
- Úrsula Bezerra - Moreninha
- Tatiana de S. Parra - Linda Estrela Da Noite
- José Luiz Burato - Grilo (singing voice)

=== English version ===
- Sam Riegel - Christopher
- Bob Papenbrook - King Wartlord
- Cindy Robinson - Honeydew / Spidora
- Peter Doyle - Magic Toucan / Soldier 1
- Bob Buchholz - Barnaby / Sergeant
- Dave Mallow - Buffuno
- Steve Staley - Leonardo
- Neil Kaplan - Toad 1
- Dan Woren - Toad 2
- Grant George - Father / Toad 3
- Stephanie Sheh - Little Christopher / Sneally
- Steve Kramer - Old Snail / General
- Mona Marshall - Cartibella
- Philece Sampler - Isabella
- Tatiana de S. Parra - Linda The Night Star (singing voice)

== See also ==
- Cinema of Brazil
- List of animated feature-length films
