= The Romantic (film) =

- Poster
- Directed by: Michael P. Heneghan
- Written by: Michael P. Heneghan
- Starring: See below
- Music by: Nathan Terry
- Release date: 2009
- Running time: 95 minutes
- Country: United States
- Language: English
- Budget: $500

The Romantic is a 2009 American animated film directed by Michael P. Heneghan.

== Plot summary ==
The Romantic was praised by critics for its smooth animation and unique visual style.

Set in a world of autumn landscapes, a young man, the Romantic, falls out of love with his girlfriend. He visits the goddess Love, asking her to restore his feelings. She warns him this is not a good idea, but when he persists she reluctantly agrees. When he returns to his girlfriend he finds her with another man. Feeling betrayed by the gods Love, Hate and Time, he sets out with his companion, Patience, seeking revenge.

The story of the Romantic is interwoven with the back story of the gods and a story about the corrupt Fat Daddy.

== Cast ==
- Jason Salerno as Romance
- Christopher Magee as Patience
- Peter Stambler as Fat Daddy
- Alee Spadoni as Po
- Ron Blasdell as Pjorrc / The Apple Man
- Jacqueline Heneghan as The Vent Monger / Old Love
- Tom Hogan as King Crookie / Mr. Gord / The Butcher
- Nathan Terry as Ludwig / The Baker / The Candlestick Maker
- Roger Taylor as Rumpelstiltskin
- Sarah Vaghari as Young Love
- Alex Albrecht as The Spank
- Amber Reeves as Aveta

Jeff Cannata, Conor Gelches and Nathan Terry provided additional voices.

== Inspiration and origin ==
Heneghan named Yuri Norstein, Jan Svankmajer, and Yiri Trnka as well as Jim Henson as inspiration for the visuals.

Greek and Norse mythologies, and the book Blood Meridian, served as inspiration for the story.

Neil Gaiman and Alan Moore were motivations for Heneghan to become an animator.

The Romantic started as a twelve minute senior thesis project while Heneghan studied at the University of the Arts and an abridged version of the 1st act, with a "to be continued..." ending, became his senior project. Character development started as early as 2003. After his graduation in 2006, he expanded it into a feature film.

== Production ==
To support himself while making the film, Heneghan did freelance animation work and worked as a comic book colorist and flatter, and later for a photo booth company and as a pastor's assistant.

Heneghan animated some 80 of the 95 minutes of the film, and drew all the characters and backgrounds himself. He documented the production process on his blog The Pumpkin Moon.

The film was released under a Creative Commons by-nc-sa 3.0 license and by-sa 3.0.

== Reception ==
The film premiered at the Boston Underground Film Festival on 30 March in 2010. After some further tweaking, it was released on the Internet in February 2011.

Mike Everleth of the Underground Film Journal (then Bad Lit) called the film "a fairy tale for adults, in every sense [with] some blue language", but also commended the visual style as "beautifully unique" and the story as a "[masterfully rich woven] tapestry for a far-out fable". He wrote that "The Romantic is a very rich and complex fairy tale and, like all good fairy tales, has deep moral metaphors buried within its story." Everleth especially lauded the characterization, both visually and in their objectives, writing they are "unable to escape their fates, in the way that many of us can feel pushed and pulled around by our own emotions."

Mark Bell of Film Threat gave the film four out of five stars, writing that "the story is a little bit all over the place" and that "allegories about religion and philosophy play out simultaneously." Visually he called it "a style all its own, and it is all-out crazy", and compared it to Yellow Submarine ("though not as psychedelic") and Picasso ("though not as abstract").

Matt Cantor of Philadelphia City Paper called the film "an eerie, haunting film that's part myth, part fairy tale, and part fable." He wrote that the plot was "more episodic" than a traditional Hollywood story arc and "at times difficult to follow", but called the Tim Burton-echoing animation ultra-smooth, gorgeous and original. He also commended Jason Salerno's performance as Romance "passionate and convincing" and Nathan Terry's original film score "sweet and atmospheric".

Director Michael P. Heneghan said that "Submitting to film festivals was far, far more expensive than making the film", but "Surprisingly, a pop-fantasy animated feature film festooned with cartoon ding-dongs and nudey parts featuring a cast of difficult-to-love monsters working out their baggage over the course of a million subversive plot points didn’t really strike a chord with most film festival curators. Our first rejection letter came from a festival that I really wanted to be a part of and thus we started our film festival application process with a small chip on the shoulder and a little bit of a wounded heart. So it goes."
