= Flatter =

Comics colorist

A flatter is a coloring specialist within the comic book industry that prepares the inked or sketched comic book page for the colorist with digital art software such as Adobe Photoshop. The specialist does so by selecting the objects on the page and filling them in with a solid color called a "flat", so that the "flats" can be used by the colorist by way of the "magic wand" tool. In this way, the colorist may select each object during the rendering process—to the exclusion of the other objects on the page—so that the object's base color may be changed, or to render the colors.

Because each colorist has preferences as to how the flats are to be done flatters usually work as freelancers commissioned directly by the colorist. Pricing for flats vary but as of early 2010 one common going rate for a flatted page was $15 if the page were inked and of regular difficulty ($30 for a double page) with $20 for a sketched page of regular difficulty ($40 for a double sketched page).

Notable flatters include Jeremiah Embs and Neil Fraser that obtained published credit for flats while working for the colorist Brian Buccellato on the comic book series Witchblade (issues #72, 73, 74) for Top Cow in 2003–2004. Other notable flatters include Alex Petretich, Talon Kelley, and Fredric Paculba, who have worked for the colorist Dave Stewart on such series as Hellboy, BPRD and received published credits for the comic Shaolin Cowboy.
