= Dano LeBlanc =

- Born: Daniel Omer LeBlanc; February 23, 1968; Moncton, New Brunswick, Canada
- Died: July 15, 2023 (aged 55); Moncton, New Brunswick, Canada
- Education: Concordia University
- Notable work: Acadieman
- Children: 1

Daniel Omer "Dano" LeBlanc (February 23, 1968 – July 15, 2023) was a Canadian musician, author, and comic book artist largely known for creating Acadieman, as well as for briefly being part of Godspeed You! Black Emperor.

== Life and career ==
Daniel Omer LeBlanc was born on February 23, 1968, in Moncton, New Brunswick. After graduating from École Mathieu-Martin in 1986, he moved to Montreal where he pursued film and English literature at Concordia University. In Montreal, LeBlanc worked for several years as a musician and filmmaker and had worked on various recordings for Godspeed You! Black Emperor, particularly the 1994 demo All Lights Fucked on the Hairy Amp Drooling where he played acoustic guitar.

LeBlanc also played as a member of bands The Great Balancing Act and Sunset Industry, and created the record label La Menuiserie. As an author and comic book artist, he created the character and series Acadieman, which was adapted into an animated television series in 2006.

LeBlanc died on July 15, 2023, at Maison Albert Hospice in Moncton, after succumbing to pancreatic cancer.
