= Kuruneko =

Japanese manga series

- Cover of the first manga volume

くるねこ
- Manga
- Written by: Yamato Kuruneko
- Published by: Enterbrain
- Volumes: 7
- Anime television series
- Directed by: Akitaro Daichi
- Studio: Dax Production
- Original network: Kansai TV, Tokai TV
- Original run: July 5, 2009 – 2010
- Episodes: 100

Kuruneko (くるねこ) is a Japanese blog-based manga series written and illustrated by Yamato Kuruneko (くるねこ大和, Kuruneko Yamato) about a lady who is completely devoted to sake and her many cats and is based on the author's own life. Enterbrain publishes the series in tankōbon format with seven volumes released. Kuruneko has also been adapted into a series of anime television shorts by Dax Production under the direction of Akitaro Daichi.
