= Acadieman =

Canadian television series

- Genre: Superhero comedy, satire
- Created by: Dano LeBlanc
- Country of origin: Canada
- Original language: Chiac
- No. of seasons: 3

Production
- Running time: 30 minutes

Original release
- Network: Rogers TV
- Release: 2005 – 2009

Acadieman is a fictional Chiac-speaking superhero, billed as the first Acadian superhero, created by cartoonist and musician Daniel "Dano" LeBlanc (1968–2023). The character appears in comic books, an animated television series and an animated feature film, Acadieman Vs. le CMA 2009. The animated series aired on the community channel Rogers TV and was later acquired by TV5 Québec Canada for national distribution, but TV5 cancelled it before its premiere. According to Radio-Canada, it was the first animated Acadian television series.

Acadieman also exists in a comic book series, published by Éditions Court-Circuit, and in an animated feature film, Acadieman Vs. le CMA 2009.

== Character and creation ==
LeBlanc described Acadieman as an Acadian "everyman", he works at a call centre, has a beer belly, drinks a lot of coffee and speaks Chiac, the regional blend of Acadian French and English. He has no actual superpowers; LeBlanc said the character is heroic only in a linguistic sense, because he dares to speak Chiac. LeBlanc, who also drew comics for Le Mascaret, La Rumeur and Kaboom, drew on Mad magazine and on everyday Acadian life in the Moncton area.

Scholars have noted that the series' use of Chiac was somewhat controversial, though attitudes toward the dialect have grown more positive as it has gained visibility in local media and music.

== Comics ==
LeBlanc published the first Acadieman comic in 2007, the second in 2008 and the third in 2009. After an eight-year hiatus during which he was a stay-at-home father, he released a fourth issue, S'échapper de Dieppe (Escape from Dieppe), in which Acadieman helps an anglophone family flee the largely francophone city of Dieppe. A limited black-and-white edition was sold at the East Coast Comic Expo in Moncton on 19–20 May 2017, followed by a full-colour release.

== Characters ==
=== Acadieman ===
The first Acadian superhero, he is the "official" pirate of the French language. He loves "the great indoors" and hates walking long distances. Coffee makes him strong, similar to the effect of spinach on Popeye. He likes hanging out in coffee shops and laughing at people while spoiling himself.

=== Other characters ===
A few characters appear regularly on the show:

- Ti-Gris
- Coquille
- Farty
- Johnny Dieppe
- Acadiemère

A few other characters have been only in a single or a few episodes. These include Anna (a satire of Anne of Green Gables) and a mutant potato (Jericot) who have appeared in the 4th episode "Le tourisme," in the first season.

== Episodes ==
=== Season 1 ===
1. Acadieman vs. Memere Spy
2. Acadieman vs. Sa Mere
3. Acadieman vs. La Beach
4. Acadieman vs. Le Tourisme
5. Acadieman vs. The Living Dead
6. Acadieman vs. Le Time Travel

(the episodes are all on the DVD of "Acadieman la complete first saison")

=== Season 2 ===
1. Acadieman Vs. Le Job Market (aired May 26, 2007)
2. Acadieman Vs. La War des Étoiles (aired June 30, 2007)
3. Acadieman Vs. Les Super Beavers (aired July 27, 2007)
4. Acadieman Vs. Les Super Heroes
5. Acadieman Vs. La Guerre Civile
6. Acadieman Vs. True Acadienne stories

(Dano LeBlanc confirmed that the second season has six episodes)

=== Season 3 ===
A full-length film entitled Acadieman vs. le CMA 2009 was released in 2009, with a plot that centred on Acadieman's efforts to save the Maritime Provinces from an invasion by the United States during the Acadian World Congress (Congrès mondial acadien). The film won the award for Best Acadian Feature at the 2009 Festival international du cinéma francophone en Acadie, and was released both as a full-length film on DVD and broken up into episodes broadcast as the third and final season of the regular series.

=== Special episodes ===
Acadieman Vs. Noël, a special Christmas episode, aired on CapAcadie.com in December, 2008. It was viewed by 10,000 people within 48 hours.

=== Ado Santé ===
Creator Dano Leblanc and his team put out fifteen (15) clips featuring Acadieman Vs. La Santé (Acadieman Vs. Health). These short videos feature Acadieman and friends in situations often faced by students during their day-to-day lives. Humorous and often less than two minutes long, the clips are also downloadable. They can be found on www.adosante.org and cover such topics as nutrition, body art, drugs and alcohol, mental health, relationship violence, physical activity and sexual health.

Since these videos are accessible throughout the globe via the Internet, all of the clips have two audio options: the legendary Chiac of Acadieman, and the other in standard French.

== Awards ==
- Rogers TV Impressions Awards (three prizes, 2006–2008), including Public Choice and Diversity Programming in 2006
- Yorkton Short Film and Video Festival, jury prize, 2006, for Acadieman – Le First Superhero acadien
- Festival international du cinéma francophone en Acadie, Vague-Léonard-Forest prize for best Acadian medium- or long-format film, 2009, for Acadieman Vs. le CMA 2009
