= The Samsonadzes =

Georgian animated sitcom (2009–2010)

- Title card
- Genre: Sitcom
- Created by: Shalva Ramishvili
- Country of origin: Georgia
- Original language: Georgian
- No. of episodes: 20

Original release
- Network: Imedi TV
- Release: November 2009 – 2010

The Samsonadzes (Georgian: სამსონაძეები, Samsonadzeebi) is a Georgian animated sitcom created and produced by Shalva Ramishvili. It first aired in Georgia in November 2009 and ended sometime in 2010.

== Description and resemblance to The Simpsons ==
The series has been described as "bearing more than a passing resemblance" to the American animated television sitcom The Simpsons, although the creator has denied accusations of plagiarism.

The Samsonadzes are "a yellow-skinned cartoon family, consisting of a dopey husband" (Gela Samsonadze, who works in a bank) "and his lavishly coiffed wife, Dodo, who live in a made-up city with their children", Shorena and Gia. They also have a parrot named Koke. Their home city has been noted for its apparent resemblance to Tbilisi.

Ramishvili has stated that the series aimed to be "relevant to Georgian reality and touch on social issues that will resonate with a Georgian audience", while its chief scriptwriter, Zviad Bliadze, explained: "We just took an average family and made a parody of the common traits, like laziness or love of alcohol."

== Russian focus ==
The series has attracted some attention by featuring Russian leaders in a negative light, in a context of tense Georgia–Russia relations. Russian President Vladimir Putin appears in one episode, sending a spy into Georgia. Ramishvili described this criticism of the Russian government as "simply our civil liberty and duty".
