= Yisa Yu =

- 郁可唯
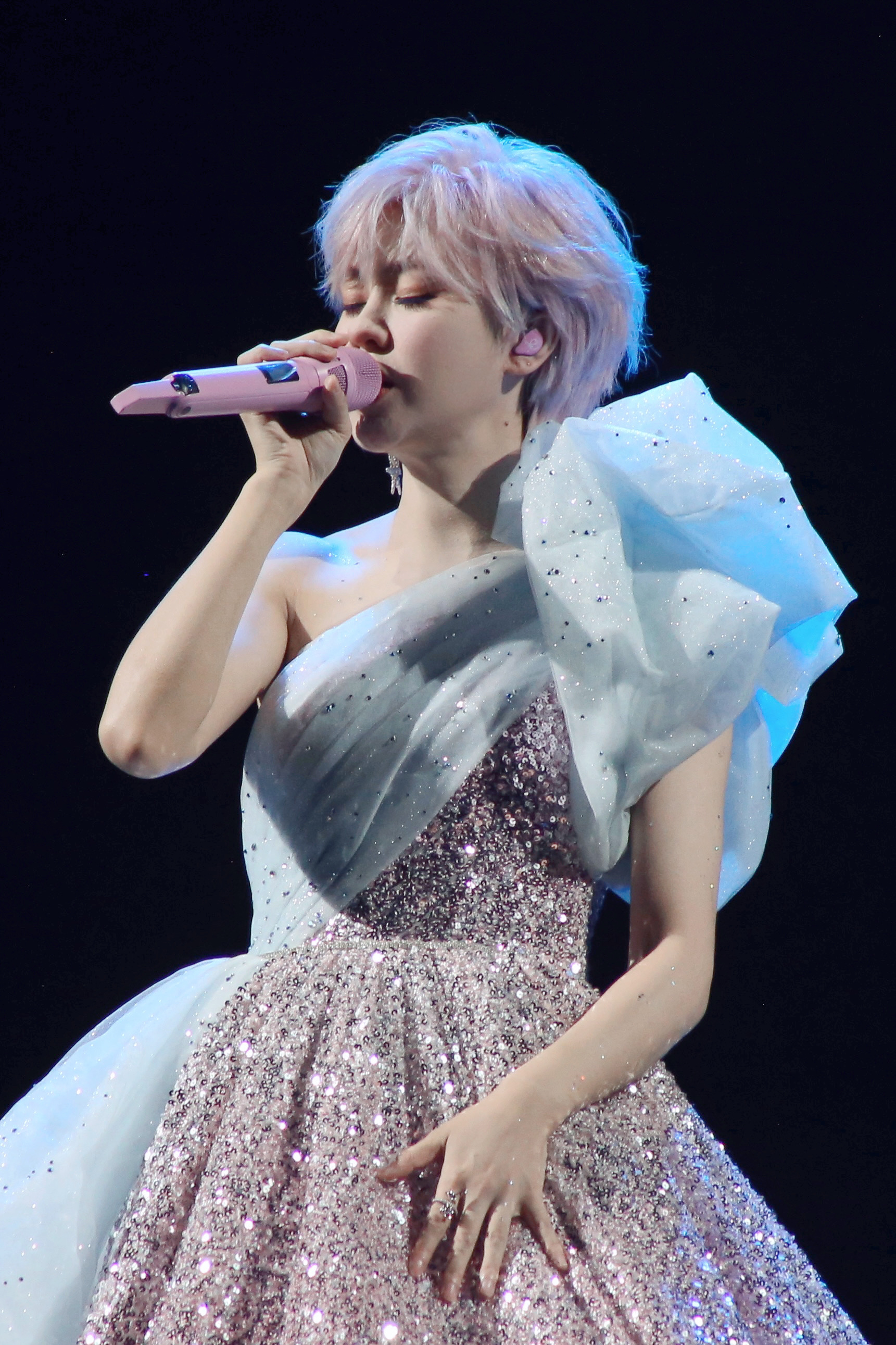
- Yu in 2023
- Born: Yu Yingxia 郁英霞; 23 October 1983 (age 42); Chengdu, Sichuan, China
- Education: Bachelor of Arts (Major in English)
- Alma mater: University of Electronic Science and Technology of China
- Occupation: Singer
- Years active: 2005–present

Chinese name
- Simplified Chinese: 郁可唯
Transcriptions
Standard Mandarin
- Hanyu Pinyin: Yù Kěwéi
- Musical career
- Also known as: Yu Kewei
- Origin: China
- Genres: Mandopop
- Instrument: Piano/guitar/drums
- Labels: Rock Records (2009–2017); HIM International Music (2017–present)

Yu Kewei (Chinese: 郁可唯; pinyin: Yù Kěwéi; born 23 October 1983), also known as Yisa Yu, is a Chinese singer. She started out singing in bars and participated in several singing competitions. Her career took off after she achieved fourth place nationally in the 2009 season of Hunan TV's Super Girl. Her fans are called Yu jin xiang (郁金香), which means "tulip"; personally named by Yisa.

== Early life ==
Yu was born on 23 October 1983 as Yu Yingxia (Chinese: 郁英霞) in Chengdu, Sichuan to parents working in the Chengdu Aircraft Industry Group. She studied English Language at the University of Electronic Science and Technology of China. She briefly took singing lessons at the insistence of her father but failed to complete. At college, Yu took part in a national singing competition for college students and defeated Li Yuchun to take the gold award.

== Career ==
After her graduation, Yu worked in a company for a few months before leaving to become a singer at the famous Lianhua fudi music bar. During that time and before the 2009 Super Girl, She recorded several original songs and released three cover albums.

In 2005 Yu auditioned, and failed, for the Chengdu Super Girl competition. The following year she auditioned again, only to fail once more. Not content with the result, she traveled to Guangzhou to enter the local competition, where she reached the last 20 before being eliminated. Her third try, in 2009, finally landed her among the winners at Chengdu to qualify to the national Super Girl. There she won the first game of the top ten to feature on the cover of Elle magazine and in the Cover Girls compilation album released by the competition. Then she was able to reach the top four before being eliminated.

Soon after the competition ended, Yu was invited to record the theme song for The King of Milu Deer, China's first 3D animated film. Then she became the first of her Super Girl peers to be selected by a label, when she signed with Rock Records on 8 December 2009. The Taiwanese label immediately announced that they have assembled a team of top producers to work on her first original album. That album was released in May 2010, titled Blue Shorts. In the latter part of the year she featured on the OST of the hit Taiwanese drama The Fierce Wife, and took part in a series of concerts to celebrate the 30th anniversary of Rock Records.

In 2011 Yu was nominated for the 22nd Golden Melody Award in the "Best New Artist" category. That caused controversy however, as she had cover albums released in mainland China before 2010, which would make her ineligible for the "new artist" category if they were released in Taiwan. She was eventually disqualified. In a statement, she respected the decision of the judge panels and said: "I would like to thank the Golden Melody Awards for the recognition the judges have given me. Although I was disqualified, it has inspired me to work harder in the future."

Yu's second album, Wei Jia Xing Fu (meaning "add a little happiness"), was released in June 2011. She continued the collaboration with big names in Taiwanese music. The most prominent was famous rocker Wu Bai. Several songs from this album were featured on the sound track of yet another popular drama, Office Girls.

The summer of 2012 saw the release of a third album, Lost Love. One of the songs (幸福難不難/"Happiness is hard") was also the theme song for the movie version of The Fierce Wife, which was released around the same time. In 2020, she participated in Sisters Who Make Waves.

== Discography ==
Album #	Title	Released date	Label
1st	Blue Shorts (蓝短裤)	5 May 2010	Rock Records Pte Ltd
2nd	Add a Little Happiness (微加幸福)	30 June 2011	Rock Records Pte Ltd
3rd	Lost Love (失恋事小)	23 July 2012	Rock Records Pte Ltd
4th	Warm Water (温水)	25 June 2014	Rock Records Pte Ltd
5th	00:00	27 December 2016	Rock Records Pte Ltd
6th	Walking by the World (路過人間)	10 May 2019	HIM International Music Inc.
7th	Dear Life	24 August 2022	HIM International Music Inc.

=== Movie/drama soundtracks ===
Year	Title	Movie/Drama
2013	"Time Boils the Rain" (时间煮雨)	Tiny Times
2016	"To Ask the Moon" (问明月)	Legend of Nine Tails Fox

=== Cover albums ===
First two albums were released under her real name, Yu Ying Xia (郁英霞).

Album #	Title	Released date	Label
1st	Paramount (百乐门)	7 April 2008	Shenzhen Co.
2nd	Cabaret (茴香小酒馆) (a.k.a. Fennel Bistro)	19 September 2008	Shenzhen Co.
3rd	So Charmed Yu's Sound! (郁音绕梁)	3 September 2009	Guangdong Audio-Visual Press

== Awards ==
Year	Award	Category	Nomination	Ref
2010	Music Radio China Top Chart Awards (Music Radio中国TOP排行榜)	Best New Artist – Mainland	Yu Kewei	
2010	Sina Music 2010 Year Review (新浪音乐2010年度盘点)	Newcomer of the Year – Mainland	Yu Kewei	
2010	Sina Music 2010 Year Review (新浪音乐2010年度盘点)	Most promising album – Mainland	Blue Shorts	
2011	Hunan TV – Baidu Entertainment Boiling Point (湖南卫视 百度娱乐沸点)	Hottest Mainland Newcomer	Yu Kewei	
2012	3rd MY Astro Music Awards (MY Astro至尊流行榜颁奖典礼)	Best breakthrough international female singer	Yisa Yu	
2012	3rd MY Astro Music Awards (MY Astro至尊流行榜颁奖典礼)	Best original song for TV	Hope (from The Fierce Wife)	
2012	Global Chinese Music Awards (全球華語歌曲排行榜)	Top 20 Hit of the Year	Hao Peng You Zhi Shi Peng You	
2012	2012 TVB8 Golden Music Awards (2012年TVB8金曲榜頒獎典禮)	Top Ten Golden Melodies	Shi Lian Shi Xiao	
2012	20th China Music Awards (中歌榜)	Songs of the Year	Shi Lian Shi Xiao	
