= The King of Milu Deer =

- Theatrical poster
- Directed by: Guo Weijiao
- Written by: Zhang Zhi Yi; Wang Wei
- Production company: CITV New Media Group
- Release date: 29 September 2009
- Country: China
- Language: Mandarin Chinese
- Budget: 35 million yuan (US $5.1 million)

The King of Milu Deer (Chinese: 麋鹿王; pinyin: Mílù wáng), also known as Finding the Milu King: The Magic Reel, is a 2009 Chinese animated film. It is touted as the first 3-D animated Chinese film. The film was produced by CITV New Media Group, a private company, and cost 35 million yuan (US $5.1 million to make. It was written by Zhang Zhi Yi and Wang Wei and directed by Guo Weijiao. The film took in 4 million yuan (US $570,000) at the box office in its first week. It won Best Animated Film at the thirteenth Hua Biao Film Awards and was nominated at the Golden Rooster and Hundred Flowers Film Awards for the Best Animation Trophy. The theme song of the film was performed by Yisa Yu.
