= The Watercolor =

- Directed by: Cihat Hazardağlı
- Release date: November 13, 2009
- Running time: 84 minutes
- Country: Turkey
- Language: Turkish

The Watercolor (Tr: Suluboya) is a 2009 Turkish animated film directed by Cihat Hazardağlı. The film went on nationwide general release on November 13, 2009.

== Plot ==
Twelve-year-old Marco has an exclusive talent for drawing. Eighteen-year-old beautiful Lorella who was brought up by three street artists, becomes Marco's art teacher. Marco falls in love with her. Not only he discovers art, but love and sexuality. Unfortunately Marco's love is one sided. Lorella is in love with an art collector who despises watercolor. Marco collects every drawing he can get a hold of. His goal is to become the greatest watercolor collector of the world. He helps the poor street artists and they give him all their drawings. When Marco turns 30, he opens the boxes he kept in the attic. What he finds will change his life.
