= The Happy Cricket and the Giant Bugs =

2009 Brazilian animated film by Walbercy Ribas, Rafael Ribas

- Theatrical release poster
- Directed by: Walbercy Ribas and Rafael Ribas
- Written by: Walbercy Ribas
- Produced by: Juliana Ribas
- Edited by: Rafael Ribas
- Music by: Ruriá Duprat
- Production company: Start Desenhos Animados
- Distributed by: 20th Century Fox
- Release date: January 9, 2009
- Running time: 80 minutes
- Country: Brazil
- Languages: Portuguese; English

The Happy Cricket and the Giant Bugs (Portuguese: O Grilo Feliz e os Insetos Gigantes) is a 2009 Brazilian animated fantasy film directed by Walbercy Ribas and Rafael Ribas and produced by Start Desenhos Animados. The film is the sequel of The Happy Cricket, released in 2001.

The Happy Cricket and the Giant Bugs was nominated for best movie in the 2009 Chicago International Children's Film Festival." In 2010, the film won the Academia Brasileira de Cinema's prize for best animation and best children's feature film.

== Production ==
This Brazilian computer-animated children's fantasy film was produced by Start Desenhos Animados. It uses animation software Adobe After Effects and Autodesk Maya.
