= Vídeo Brinquedo =

Brazilian animation studio

- Formerly: Spot Films (1995–2004)
- Type: Private
- Industry: Mockbusters (formerly); Educational animation (as Crianças Inteligentes)
- Founded: 1995; 31 years ago
- Founder: Fernando Francielli; Marco Botana; Maurício Milani
- Headquarters: São Paulo, Brazil
- Key people: Maurício Milani
- Parent: Rexmore Widea
- Website: videobrinquedo.com.br

Vídeo Brinquedo (also known as Toyland Video or Toy Video in English, formerly known as Spot Films) is a Brazilian animation studio based in São Paulo, known for producing animated films widely viewed as cheap mockbusters of comparable, more successful films from studios such as Walt Disney Animation Studios, Pixar, DreamWorks Animation, 20th Century Animation, and Blue Sky Studios.

The company was founded in 1995 as a Brazilian subsidiary of the American distributor Spot Films, to distribute animation in its home market of Brazil, then seemingly split up and became Vídeo Brinquedo in 2004. Later on, in 2006, they expanded to North America with the falling costs of DVD duplication and packaging and easier access to language translation services. Most of Vídeo Brinquedo's films are still available on DVD and streaming services, though it is unclear who the current owners of the studio's output are.

== Background ==
For its first nine years, Vídeo Brinquedo distributed Portuguese-dubbed home video releases of shows such as Sonic X and The Little Lulu Show in the Brazilian market.

One of the studio's early distributions was the obscure religious-themed cartoon Kingdom Under the Sea (Portuguese: Reino submarino), which experienced an increase of sales following the release of the 2003 Pixar film Finding Nemo. Kingdom Under the Sea and Finding Nemo shared several similarities, such as the presence of a clownfish and a story centered on a parent-child relationship. As a result of its sales, Brinquedo wanted to start not only distributing cartoons, but also create their own.

Vídeo Brinquedo's first animations were traditional 2D animations, based on public domain fairy tales such as Pinocchio and The Three Little Pigs, but with scripts that modernized the characters. They later expanded to 3D animation, their first 3D animated film being The Little Cars (Portuguese: Os Carrinhos), loosely based on the 2006 Pixar animated film Cars. The film sold over a million copies in its first month in Brazil, as well as over 5,000 copies per week in the United States at stores like Walmart.

The original idea of the company was to jump on trends raised by the major studios and start production of animation two to three years in advance. With the company borrowing ideas established in Hollywood, company director Mauricio Milani stated, "we tried to imagine what it will be in advance". The films are often only just over 40 minutes in length, the minimum required to qualify as a feature film and awards qualification. Their films' English-dubbed casts, such as The Little Panda Fighter, featured voice actors from 4Kids Entertainment.

Originally released with a Portuguese-language soundtrack, many of Vídeo Brinquedo's titles were co-produced with Rexmore Company in Brazil, and distributed in North America by Branscome International, MorningStar Entertainment with English and Spanish soundtracks, Brightspark Productions in the United Kingdom, and Janson Media on Amazon Prime Video.

== Filmography ==
=== Feature films ===
Year	Title	Original film
2004	Pinocchio	
2005	Rapunzel	
2006	The Little Cars: In The Great Race	Cars
2007	The Little Cars 2: Rodopolis Adventures	Cars
2007	Ratatoing	Ratatouille
2007	Gladiformers	Transformers
2007	Little Bee	Bee Movie
2007	Little Princess School	Disney Princess
2007	The Little Cars 3: Fast and Curious	Cars
2008	The Little Panda Fighter	Kung Fu Panda
2008	The Little Cars 4: New Genie Adventures	Cars
2008	Tiny Robots	WALL-E
2008	Gladiformers 2	Transformers
2009	Little and Big Monsters	Monsters vs. Aliens
2009	Cinderella	
2009	What's Up: Balloon to the Rescue	Up
2009	The Frog Prince	The Princess and the Frog
2010	The Little Cars 5: Big Adventures	Cars
2010	Soccer Passion	
2011	Barquinhos	

== Film distribution ==
Besides producing its own animated movies, Vídeo Brinquedo has also distributed DVDs of foreign cartoons, including Sonic X, The Adventures of Super Mario Bros. 3, Little Lulu, Batfink, and fairy tale films made by Video Treasures, now Anchor Bay Entertainment. One of its most controversial distributions is Mega Powers!, a Brazilian production of Intervalo Produções that is similar to the series Power Rangers and Super Sentai.

== Reception ==
Vídeo Brinquedo's animated films have been criticized for copying other mainstream animated films, as well as for their poor animation, voice acting, and writing, with scenes that merely exist as "filler" so the films' runtime can qualify as "feature length". Erik Henriksen, a reporter from The Portland Mercury, criticized Vídeo Brinquedo as being "the laziest/cheapest movie studio of all time," due to similarities between its releases and the films of other animation studios, such as Pixar.

Marco Aurélio Canônico of Folha de S. Paulo, who criticized the Little Cars series as a copy of the Pixar film Cars, and likewise Ratatoing and Ratatouille, discussed whether lawsuits from Pixar would appear. The Brazilian Ministry of Culture posted Marco Aurélio Canônico's article on its website. Virgin Media also stated, "even by the ocean-floor-scraping standards of Vídeo Brinquedo, it's a shameless knock-off". Disney's legal department was contacted by a reporter through a spokesperson about a potential lawsuit, but did not comment.

In 2011, What's Up! Balloon to the Rescue was removed from the Toronto Public Library due to complaints about being "offensive and racist".

== In other media ==
- The Little Panda Fighter and Ratatoing were parodied in an episode of The Amazing World of Gumball called "The Treasure", in which Gumball picks up a mockbuster DVD called How to Ratatwang Your Panda, a poorly rendered CGI film where a panda farts in front of several rats.
- In late 2008, the official video racing game based on a mockbuster of Cars called The Little Cars: In The Great Race was released. The game was produced by the Romanian studio Sodevrom and released by Brightspark Productions.

== See also ==
- Mockbuster
- The Asylum, another studio notable for mockbusters
- Jetlag Productions
