= Killer Bean Forever =

2008 American animated film by Jeff Lew

- DVD cover
- Directed by: Jeff Lew
- Written by: Jeff Lew
- Produced by: Jeff Lew
- Starring: Vegas E. Trip; Bryan Session; David Guilmette; Matthew Tyler; Jeff Lew
- Cinematography: Jeff Lew
- Edited by: Jeff Lew
- Music by: Justin R. Durban; Jeff Lew
- Production company: Killer Bean Studios
- Distributed by: Cinema Management Group
- Release dates: September 2008 (Toronto Film Festival); July 14, 2009 (U.S.)
- Running time: 85 minutes
- Country: United States
- Language: English
- Budget: <$1 million

Killer Bean Forever is a 2008 American adult animated independent neo-noir action film written, produced, directed and animated by Jeff Lew, starring Vegas E. Trip, Bryan Session, David Guilmette, Matthew Tyler and Jeff Lew. It is part of a larger Killer Bean media franchise and was preceded by 2 web shorts: Killer Bean: The Interrogation in 1996, and Killer Bean 2: The Party in 2000. Set in a world of anthropomorphic coffee beans, the film follows the assassin Jack "Killer" Bean, who under Shadow Agency orders is sent to hunt down a crime boss, while he himself is hunted by mercenaries and the police.

The movie has obtained a cult following online, beginning in 2018. In 2020, an animated series that continues the story of the film was announced, and premiered on September 6, 2020, but was cancelled in August 2021. In the same month, a game simply titled Killer Bean was announced, which also continues the film's story.

== Plot ==
External videos
- Official upload of full movie on YouTube

One night in Beantown, Shadow Agency agent Killer Bean calls a DJ at a nearby warehouse party to lower the music's volume as it's disturbing his sleep. The DJ ignores his request, prompting Killer Bean to kill everyone at the warehouse. The DJ reveals he is a nephew of Cappuccino, a notorious crime boss and drug lord, before Killer Bean executes him. After the shooting, Detective Cromwell and a police officer investigate the crime scene, finding bullet casings engraved by Killer Bean as a calling card. Vagan, Cappuccino's head of weapons, arrives near the warehouse and is informed by Cromwell about Killer Bean's involvement in the shooting, who appears to be hunting Cappuccino as well.

Later that morning, Killer Bean watches the police investigate the scene further, identifying Cromwell before being interrupted by a call from his superior. Killer Bean's superior chastises him for attracting unwanted attention, reminding him to focus on killing his target. Meanwhile, Jet Bean, another Shadow Agency agent, is assigned a mission in Beantown. At the same time, Cappuccino learns of his nephew's death and orders Vagan to kill Killer Bean. Detective Cromwell, with his colleague Harry assisting him, identifies Killer Bean, who is already at his reported location—an abandoned warehouse owned by Cappuccino.

At the warehouse, Vagan ambushes Killer Bean with an anti-materiel rifle when the latter is distracted by a note identifying him as a "Shadow Bean", but it results in both leaving unscathed after the rifle is disabled in a gunfight. Inside a bar, Cromwell confronts Killer Bean and explains that Cappuccino is virtually untouchable due to a lack of proof. Cromwell gives Killer Bean the location of Cappuccino's main warehouse, suggesting he assassinates Cappuccino in exchange for Cromwell covering up the warehouse shootout, which would stop the press from putting attention on Killer Bean and by extension his superior, but Killer Bean declines. Cromwell leaves the bar, but then finds the note. Waiting outside, he interrogates Killer Bean about the identity of Shadow Bean, but Killer Bean refuses to provide information. Cromwell learns from Harry that a Shadow Bean refers to a Shadow Agency member, a black ops organization that was formerly contracted by the government.

Killer Bean, choosing to follow the lead Cromwell gave him, attacks the main warehouse. He kills the gangsters and mercenaries defending it, but is ultimately knocked out by an explosion from Vagan's motorcycle. Cappuccino interrogates Killer Bean about his target, but Killer Bean frees himself and has a standoff with Cappuccino and Vagan. Killer Bean reveals that his target is actually Vagan. Cappuccino fires Vagan for drawing attention and lying to him, but is killed by the latter. Vagan reveals that he is a decorated former agent of the Shadow Agency, who destroyed their databases and stole intel after realizing the agency went from vigilantes that protected civilians to mercenaries who will serve anyone. After deserting, Vagan began working for Cappuccino, as his position allowed him to track weapon purchases between the largest threats. Killer Bean has his worldview shaken, but kills Vagan when the latter aims at him. Before dying, Vagan warns Killer Bean that the agency will go after him next, as he now knows the truth and could potentially stop the agency. Killer Bean attempts to call the agency, but finds that his phone has been deactivated. Jet Bean arrives at Beantown, revealing that his target is Killer Bean. Cromwell, who witnessed the attack from afar, arrives with the entire Beantown police force, but convinces Killer Bean to surrender both to learn more about the Shadow Agency and to protect him. Killer Bean is placed in a jail cell as Cromwell leaves for the night, promising to talk with Killer Bean in the morning.

Learning of Killer Bean's arrest, Jet Bean intentionally gets himself arrested in order to see Killer Bean. At the police station, he kills every police officer present and confronts Killer Bean. Killer Bean attempts to tell Jet Bean about the truth, but Jet Bean dismisses him as being manipulated by Vagan. The confrontation leads into a fight between the two and ends in Jet Bean's death. Outside the station, Killer Bean uses Jet Bean's phone to call his superior, warning that he intends to destroy the Shadow Agency before driving away in a police van full of weapons.

== Voice cast ==
- Vegas E. Trip in a dual role as
  - Jack "Killer" Bean, an anthropomorphic coffee bean and assassin working for the Shadow Agency as a Shadow Bean, until he finds out their true nature. He uses a pair of gold-plated handguns and martial arts to assassinate his targets.
  - DJ Bean, Cappuccino's nephew and a gangster who dreamed of being a DJ at a night club, but was killed by Killer Bean for annoying him with his loud music, the News Reporter, and other beans as extras.
- Bryan Session in a dual role as
  - Detective Cromwell, a police detective who is put in charge of hunting down both Killer Bean and Cappuccino.
  - Vagan (Dark Bean), a gangster running guns for Cappuccino and former Shadow Bean for the Agency, having quit after they betrayed him.
- Matthew Tyler as Cappuccino, an Italian international crime boss and drug lord who wants to exact revenge on Killer Bean for killing his nephew.
- Jeff Lew as Jet Bean, an East Asian assassin working for the Shadow Agency who is sent to hunt down Killer Bean.
  - Lew also voices other beans as extras.
- David Guilmette in a dual role as
  - Kent, the Leader of the Shadow Agency, Killer Bean and Jet Bean's mysterious boss who is only heard on the phone; credited as "The Voice".
  - Harry, a police officer and Detective Cromwell's friend; the Mercenary Leader, the leader of a squad of mercenaries sent by Vagan to kill Killer Bean; the Bartender, the owner of the bar where Killer Bean and Cromwell first meet; and other beans as extras.

== Production ==
The concept for Killer Bean came in a short produced by Jeff Lew in 1996 entitled "The Killer Bean: The Interrogation", which was later called "Killer Bean 1". Jeff Lew intended this short only to teach himself animation, and it only received about 3000 hits. After practicing animation for about 2 years, Lew started work on "The Killer Bean 2: The Party", a 7-minute short. "The Killer Bean 2" took about 3 years to create, and was released on iFilm in 2000. In about 6 months, it received about a million views, which was significant before YouTube. A later edit, "Killer Bean 2.1", was uploaded to DivX in 2004. "Killer Bean 2.1" was also later uploaded to YouTube in 2009, which has since gained more than 4 million views.

After receiving various calls from movie producers that never developed, Lew decided to make a full feature film himself. The first rough draft of the screen play took about 5 months. Previsualization (previz) took about one and a half years. One mistake Lew regretted was not making the concept art before previz, which meant that many of the previz shots could not be reused for final animation. Lew then posted an ad on Craigslist for voices, and auditioned about 20 people and cast four. The concept artist for the characters was Von C. Caberte. By July 2005, all pre-production was completed.

The film took about five years to create, with approximately one and half years in pre-production and three years in animation. Killer Bean Forever had approximately 1000 animated shots. Generally, animators are given 1–4 weeks to complete one shot, and thus to create 1000 shots would have taken 20 years. Lew used an inexpensive 2D motion capture system to speed up animation, primarily with lip-sync. During this time, Lew also worked as an animator on major Hollywood productions including The Matrix Reloaded and X-Men.

== Release ==
In 2008, the worldwide rights to Killer Bean Forever were acquired by Cinema Management Group. That same year, the film was screened for buyers at the Toronto Film Festival.

The film was released on DVD in the United States on July 14, 2009.

In May 2018, the film was officially uploaded to YouTube in its entirety in 4K resolution, gaining over 89 million views as of July 2026.

== Reception ==
Scott McDanel of RMU Sentry Media called the film "an absolute dumpster fire," but wrote that he would "still highly recommend it as a 'it's-so-bad-it's-good' flick."

The YouTube upload significantly contributed to the film's cult following, causing moments and references of the film to become a meme.

== Video games ==
In 2012, a mobile game, Killer Bean: Unleashed, was released for Android and iOS. Taking place shortly after Killer Bean Forever, the story follows Killer Bean who is on the run from mercenaries, while hunting the Shadow Agency's top Shadow Bean, Major Firepower. In 2021, the game received several updates on Android, the first updating the game to a newer version of Unity to prepare for new levels. Then, the game was updated to use 3D models instead of sprites and added the Pixel levels. Later updates added new levels and enemies.

A third-person, open-world shooter game based on Killer Bean was announced in August 2021. Lew planned on bringing the game to Windows, MacOS and Linux in 2024, and consoles such as PlayStation 4, PlayStation 5, Xbox One, Xbox Series X/S and Nintendo Switch after the game's full release. The game is planned to cost US$20. In August 2023, an official trailer was uploaded for the game, announcing a demo and showcasing gameplay of the game. The game was expected to launch in early access on Steam in 2024; an extended gameplay trailer was revealed during Summer Game Fest 2024. Its Steam early access release was delayed to June 8, 2026, and released the same day.

== Web series ==
In January 2020, Lew revealed Killer Bean's return in a 10+ episode web series, although it had been delayed in late February. Lew claimed that famous YouTubers and fans will voice act the characters in the series.

On May 10, 2020, The Return of Killer Bean, a teaser for the web series, was released onto YouTube. "The Return of Killer Bean" was released as a teaser for the upcoming 2020 series in 4K. The short features Killer Bean attacking a group of mercenaries, but when the last surviving bean threatens to shoot a hole through his car door, just like he did with his mother's, Killer Bean attempts to reason with him. Claiming that the mercenary has some personal problems, Killer Bean lets him take his car and throws him the keys. The last bean tries to find the keys in some trash bags, but when he finds them, the keys are actually an explosive device. The explosion throws the mercenary into a garbage can, though he survives, before Killer Bean leaves in his car.

On September 6, 2020, the first episode was released. On November 20, 2020, the second and final episode was released.

In August 2021, due to the new Killer Bean game in development and getting false copyright claims on YouTube before, Lew announced that the series is no longer in production.

On October 1, 2022, a new series titled Killer Bean - The Prequel was officially announced. Taking place before the events of Killer Bean Forever, the story follows Killer Bean's training into the Shadow Agency. The first episode titled Driving School was released on September 29, 2022.

=== Cast ===
- Jack "Killer" Bean (voiced by Jeff Lew) - A bean assassin and a former Shadow Bean who is trying to hunt down and end the Shadow Agency.
- MAX (voiced by Various Actors) - An AI drone built by Kessler who helps Killer Bean hunt down the Shadow Agency.
- Kessler (voiced by Charles White Jr.) - A former Shadow Bean and engineer who specializes in computers and built an AI drone named MAX.
- Reximus (voiced by Max Lundgren) - A gamer bean who is the leader of his clan.
- Sniper (voiced by Rin Mojica) - A female assassin who is Reximus' second in command.

=== Episodes ===
Season	Episodes	Originally released	
Season	Episodes	First released	Last released
Pilot		10 May 2020	
1	2	6 September 2020	20 November 2020

==== Pilot (2020) ====
Title	Directed by	Written by	Original release date	Viewers (millions)
"The Return of Killer Bean"	Jeff Lew	Jeff Lew	10 May 2020	5.1
Killer Bean's car is stolen by unknown enemies. Now Killer Bean must get his car back before the enemies damage his car.

==== Season 1 (2020) ====
No. overall	No. in season	Title	Directed by	Written by	Original release date	Viewers (millions)
1	1	"Episode 1"	Jeff Lew	Jeff Lew	6 September 2020	5.0
Killer Bean tracks down a hacker named Kessler in order to find The Shadow Agency's base, but it turns out to be way more complicated than he thought after he destroys Kessler's supercomputer.
2	2	"Episode 2"	Jeff Lew	Jeff Lew	20 November 2020	2.8
Killer Bean and MAX track down a gamer and weapons dealer named Reximus to steal his CPU: the only functioning one (of its kind) in the world.
