= Oblivion Island: Haruka and the Magic Mirror =

- Japanese release poster

Japanese name
- Kanji: ホッタラケの島 〜遥と魔法の鏡〜
Transcriptions
- Revised Hepburn: Hottarake no Shima: Haruka to Mahō no Kagami
- Directed by: Shinsuke Sato
- Written by: Hirotaka Adachi; Shinsuke Sato
- Produced by: Mitsuhisa Ishikawa; Michiru Ishikawa; Chihiro Kameyama; Yoshio Takada
- Starring: Haruka Ayase; Miyuki Sawashiro; Mitsuki Tanimura
- Cinematography: Koji Tanaka
- Edited by: Tsuyoshi Imai
- Music by: Tadashi Ueda
- Production companies: Production I.G; Polygon Pictures
- Distributed by: Toho
- Release date: August 22, 2009
- Running time: 100 minutes
- Country: Japan
- Language: Japanese

Oblivion Island: Haruka and the Magic Mirror (ホッタラケの島 〜遥と魔法の鏡〜, Hottarake no Shima: Haruka to Mahō no Kagami) is a 2009 Japanese computer-animated film directed by Shinsuke Sato. It was produced in commemoration of Fuji Television's 50th anniversary. The film was nominated for the award for Excellent Animation of the Year at the 33rd Japan Academy Prize. The film is produced using Autodesk Maya 3D software.

== Plot ==
After losing her mother at a young age, Haruka has treasured the hand mirror she had received from her. As she grew older, she forgot about the mirror and eventually lost it. One day, she decides to go to a local shrine and pray to Inari for the hand mirror to be returned to her. After a brief nap, she drops her house key under the steps, but when she retrieves them, a small fox-like creature, takes her key. She follows the creature into the woods, and comes across a small pool with one of the eggs offered at the shrine. She dips her hand into it but is sucked through the pool and lands in a cart with the creature.

The creature, named Teo, explains to Haruka she is in the world of the neglected, made of forgotten things because his race cannot make things themselves. Haruka agrees to give him her keychain if he can help her find the mirror. With Haruka in disguise, the two board a tram cart to the main town on Oblivion Island. After asking several vendors, Haruka discovers that the mirror has magical powers, and it was kept by the Baron, the leader of the land who hovers in an airship, but that it was stolen. A group of bullies try to remove Haruka's mask, but Teo and Haruka escape.

At a theater area where they project the memories of neglected things. Haruka recognizes her stuffed animal named Cotton, who is upset that Haruka neglected him. When the bullies bust in with a large ostrich-like contraption, Haruka grabs Cotton and they escape. At Teo's place, Haruka learns Teo wants to build a real airplane. Cotton shares that the mirror was taken by a group of underground bandits called the Petitloss. While Teo goes to get water, he is captured and delivered to the Baron, who orders him to help Haruka find the mirror but bring it to the Baron, who will neglect his crime and will also give him a huge reward of stamp cards.

Haruka, Teo and Cotton head into the lair of the Petitloss. They soon find themselves attacked by Petitloss and a large Petitloss creature. Cotton removes the threads from the large creature and Haruka finds her mirror. Although they escape the underground area, the Baron arrives to seize the mirror and to abduct Haruka. Teo is left with a pile of stamp cards but he is upset about his choice to betray his friend.

The Baron tries to make Haruka swallow an Oblivion Drop in order to remove her memories. Teo tells the townsfolk that humans are actually good. He gives away his stamp cards, and the townsfolk build him a plane, which he flies. Cotton rallies the petit-loss to raid the airship, and Haruka breaks free. The Baron activates a bunch of robots using the power of the mirror to grab Haruka, but she falls off the airship, and hangs by a banner. Cotton attacks the Baron but he rips Cotton in two and tosses it. Haruka dives after Cotton and falls, but Teo rescues her in the plane. The Baron's airship attacks the plane. It falls onto a tunnel track but they reverse it in time to get out. They crash into the airship. Teo and Haruka climb the inside and the array of the other mirrors to try to get the hand mirror. The Baron tries to stop them, but Haruka grabs the mirror and it activates. Haruka finds herself inside the mirror which shows memories of her family life; she cries. The Baron chases them out of the mirror but accidentally damages the airship, causing all his mirrors to fly around. Teo snatches the mirror as the Baron falls and the airship crashes and is destroyed. The Baron is reduced to a mask-less creature and flees. Later, Teo sends off Haruka and Cotton through the portal, where she returns to the temple and calls her dad to meet him for dinner.

== Voice cast ==
Character	Japanese	English
Haruka	Haruka Ayase	Christine Marie Cabanos
Teo	Miyuki Sawashiro	Cassandra Lee
Mother	Naho Toda	Julie Ann Taylor
Father	Nao Omori	David Roach
Miho	Mitsuki Tanimura	Mio Tanaka (Note: The closing credits list Mio Tanaka as the English voice of Miho, but the cast announcement as reported by Anime News Network lists producer Maki Terashima-Furuta.)
Baron	Iemasa Kayumi	Patrick Seitz
Cotton	Tamaki Matsumoto	Julie Maddalena
Picanta	Yuji Ueda	Mark V. McCollum
Vikki	Yuko Kaida	Tara Platt
Decargot	Hidenari Ugaki	Kyle Hebert
Elder Brother Soldier		George C. Cole
Younger Brother Soldier		Derek Stephen Prince
Researcher		Xanthe Huynh
Puppeteer Wife		Amanda C. Miller
Passenger		Victor Sgroi
Additional Voices		Erik Scott Kimerer, Erika Harlacher, Matthew Wolfson

== Reception ==
The film was nominated for the 4th Asia Pacific Screen Award for Best Animated Feature Film. In 2010, the film won the Nippon Cinema Award at the Nippon Connection Film Festival. In 2013, it was one of the feature films of the Japanese Film festival organized by Golden Screen Cinemas in Malaysia.

== Home media ==
The Oblivion Island: Haruka and the Magic Mirror Blu-ray was released in the US on August 14, 2012, by FUNimation Entertainment. Both the Blu-ray and DVD releases of the film were released in Japan on February 26, 2010.

== Video game ==
A video game spin-off released for the Nintendo DS called Oblivion Island: Kanata and the Rainbow Mirror (ホッタラケの島 〜カナタと虹色の鏡〜, Hottarake no Shima: Kanataa to Nijiiro no Kagami) was developed by Climax Entertainment and published by Namco Bandai Games on August 6, 2009, exclusively in Japan.
