= List of Geronimo Stilton episodes =

Geronimo Stilton (also known as The New Adventures of Geronimo Stilton in season 3) is an animated children's television series based on the book series of the same name. The series debuted on Rai 2 in Italy on September 15, 2009.

== Series overview ==
Season	Episodes	Originally released	
Season	Episodes	First released	Last released
1	26	September 15, 2009	March 18, 2010
2	26	October 24, 2011	April 16, 2012
3	26	October 8, 2016	February 28, 2017

== Episodes ==
=== Season 1 (2009–10) ===
No.	Title	Written by	Storyboard by	Original release date	Prod. code
1	"Operation Shufongfong"	Julien Frey and Vincent Bonjour	Pier Di Già and Lisa Arioli	September 15, 2009	TBA
Geronimo and Benjamin report on the arrival of the elusive Prince Nogouda in New Mouse City. Despite Nogouda having never given an interview before, Nogouda grants an interview to Geronimo. Before the interview, they visit the museum, where the last two Shufongfong lizards alive are on display, but they witness a thief stealing the Shufongfong, failing to capture him. Still, they visit the prince at the hotel for the interview, but Nogouda claims he needs to return to his kingdom on urgent business. However, he allows the Stiltons to follow him and interview him there. At the palace, they notice Nogouda's men are searching for something, and suspect it could be the Shufongfong. While Thea distracts Nogouda, Geronimo and Benjamin search the area, eventually finding one of them, who has apparently escaped from its cage. They find a secret room containing many stolen animals, whom Nogouda had been illegally collecting. Suddenly, Nogouda and his men appear and capture them in cages, intending to add them to his collection. He reveals he has also forced Thea to be his bride, taking Thea into the animal room. Taking advantage of Nogouda's germaphobia, the Stiltons sneeze on Nogouda, making him panic. They then break free from their cages, free the other animals, and flee the palace. Nogouda's men follows them and confront them, but Trap uses a magic trick to bind them with rope, capturing them. Concluding the case, Geronimo reports to the Rodent's Gazette that the Shufongfong were safely returned to the museum, and Prince Nogouda is now in jail for his crimes.
2	"It's My Scoop"	Tom Mason and Dan Danko	Pier Di Già and Patrizia Nasi	September 16, 2009	TBA
Geronimo and Benjamin rush to city hall for an exclusive interview with the new mayor, but finds his rival, Sally Rasmaussen, has had her assistant, Simon Squealer, pose as Geronimo and steal his interview. From Sally's broadcast, the mayor reveals his plans to introduce a secret celebrity at the city's centennial celebration. As Sally has stolen Geronimo's exclusives, they believe Sally has a spy in the office and begin investigating. Just then, an anonymous package arrives at Geronimo's door, so he and Benjamin chase after its deliverer through the streets. They eventually follow the deliverer to the house of singer Talia Squeaks, who explains she is the secret celebrity, and requests Geronimo's help in hiding her from Sally's paparazzi, who remain determined to uncover the secret celebrity. Geronimo and Benjamin bring Talia to the office, but they see Sally's car parked near the dumpster and reporters surround the front entrance, so they ask Trap to create a diversion. Trap pretends to be an alien, gaining the attention of the media. While the mayor meets Trap and crowns him the leader of the city, Geronimo helps Talia enter the office. However, as Geronimo later speaks to Trap, Simon exposes Trap as a fraud. The crowd immediately attacks the Stiltons, and Sally reports Geronimo's hoax to the Daily Rat, while also announcing she has discovered the identity of the secret celebrity, though she strangely withholds it from her audience. Geronimo deduces Sally is bluffing, only pretending to know who the secret celebrity is. Meanwhile, Sally sends her staff to spy on Geronimo, aware Geronimo is hiding the secret celebrity. Knowing this, Geronimo falsely announces the secret celebrity as Laura Limburger, sending Trap to pose as Laura Limburger to lure Sally and the reporters away. While Sally humiliates herself interviewing Trap, Geronimo is able to bring Squeaks to the mayor's office, keeping her identity secret until the celebration begins. The mayor thanks Geronimo for his service, forgiving him for creating the alien hoax. After watching Geronimo's interview with Talia on TV in his office, he, Trap, and Benjamin looked at the security footage from a security camera that Benjamin hid earlier. The footage shows Geronimo throwing out his old notes in the trash, which explains that the reason why The Daily Rat stole Geronimo's interviews was because Sally went to the dumpster earlier to dig out his notes. So Geronimo decided to get a paper shredder to avoid it happening again.
3	"Stop Acting Around"	Rob Humphrey & John Behnke	Alain Mignot & Michel Molnar	September 17, 2009	TBA
Geronimo is invited by a movie director, E. J. Sprocket, to the set where a new adventure movie is being filmed, Block Cheddar 4. However, when Geronimo arrives at the set, he discovers that the movie filming had been disrupted by several accidents around the set. While the movie was being filmed, a bell tower explodes, damaging the set. This draws suspicion among the Stiltons that the incidents were connected, prompting further investigation. The Stiltons split up; while Geronimo and Benjamin interview those involved in the project, Thea and Pandora go undercover in search of clues. Geronimo's group notices that the film's lead actor, Jack Vole, has suspiciously dirty fingernails and bags under his eyes, despite being an actor that wore gloves. Suddenly, the movie's camera van, along with all the filming equipment, was stolen, forcing the movie filming to be suspended until further notice. Geronimo investigates the scene of the crime, where he discovers footprints with gold dust. With Vole's guidance, Geronimo and Benjamin decide to follow the footprints to the nearby mineshaft. On the way to the mineshaft, the group is attacked as the climbing rope is cut, causing him to nearly fall into a deep gorge. Geronimo and Benjamin are rescued by Thea and Pandora, who decide to join the group as they investigate the mine. Inside the mineshaft, the group discovers large amounts of gold. After reasonable suspicion, Geronimo discovers that Vole had been sabotaging the movie set in order to postpone the filming so that he could gather the gold deposits. After his suspicions are confirmed, Vole throws dynamite at the group and escapes. Geronimo's group is left stranded in the mine, and they are chased by a bear. They fall down into the broken elevator, and narrowly escape a large rolling boulder. The boulder breaks open the exit, allowing Geronimo's group to exit the mine. Meanwhile, Vole returns to the mine and seizes a large nugget of gold. He carries the gold into a hot air balloon and attempts to escape. Although Geronimo is unable to stop the hot air balloon from taking off, he constructs a makeshift ballista out of scrap material and uses it to launch himself onto the balloon. After a brief skirmish on top of the balloon, Vole accidentally tears the balloon, causing it to crash into a river below. Vole is captured by Geronimo, and the Stiltons bring Vole to the proper authorities before covering the story live at the movie set. The episode ends with Geronimo being chased by the same bear after accidentally catching it.
4	"The Mummy with No Name" (Note: This episode was adapted from the book series.)	Kurt Weldon	Riccardo Audisio	September 22, 2009	TBA
During a field trip to the Mouse Museum's Egyptian exhibit, a child strays away from his class, only to encounter a living mummy. After a string of mummy-related attacks at the museum, curator Hier O. Glyph closes the exhibit and turns to the Stiltons for help. Geronimo agrees to investigate the museum in order to find the perpetrator of the attacks. At the start of their search, the Stiltons are quick to discover the unnerving, mummy-like groans that could be throughout the museum. After splitting up to investigate on their own, the investigation quickly becomes complicated. Geronimo becomes accidentally ensnared by Trap's "mummy traps," they encounter an angry custodian that cleans the museum during the late night, and at one point Thea and Benjamin become locked in a room. However, the Stiltons finally encounter the mummy after he pushes Trap into a sarcophagus. At this point, they discover that the sounds are travelling through the air ducts, where they echo and are amplified throughout the entire building. Geronimo attempts a different strategy, attempting to lure the mummy to approach them. However, this plan fails as although the Stiltons are able to corner the mummy, it disappears in front of their eyes. They discover the secret passage which the mummy used to transport itself throughout the building. Following the mummy to the planetarium, the Stiltons approach the mummy on the hanging planet models, where Thea manages to unravel the mummy's bandages and allow the others to corner the perpetrator, a woman wearing a black catsuit. The perpetrator introduces herself as Shadow, a burglar in search of Akhenraten's famed treasure, which was claimed to be unobtainable by thieves. However, Geronimo reveals that the treasure was, in reality, Akhenraten's wife, Neferati, who turns out to bear a striking resemblance to Thea. After handing Shadow to authorities, the Stiltons return to the Rodent's Gazette office to write the article.
5	"Barry the Mousetache"	Temple Mathews	Pier Di Già and Lisa Arioli	September 23, 2009	TBA
Geronimo is humiliated in the press by a juvenile stunt organized by Sally Rasmaussen of the Daily Rat, and her assistant, Simon Squealer. However, Sally mysteriously goes missing, and Daily Rat reporters blame the disappearance on recently-released mob boss, Barry the Moustache. Years ago, Barry the Moustache was unintentionally caught by Geronimo Stilton as he unknowingly found Barry, who attempted to leave a crime scene in disguise. Now that Barry has been released from prison Geronimo is now fearful for his life. However, desperate, Simon Squealer decides to turn to the Stiltons for help finding Sally. Reluctant, Geronimo agrees, and investigates the Daily Rat parking lot. Based on the found evidence, they determine that Sally was walking to her car when she was forcefully dragged away, forced into a car, and driven away. However, as he is investigating, Thea and Trap are attacked by Barry's goons, confirming that Barry was indeed in pursuit of the Stiltons. The Stiltons use city security footage to track the kidnapper's car to the shipyard. Upon following the evidence, Benjamin detects people hiding in a warehouse building. There, they shockingly find Sally safe and unharmed; the entire kidnapping was staged by Sally and Squealer as another hit piece meant to embarrass Geronimo. After taking humiliating photos of him, Simon flees to print the images. However, on the way back to the office, he is intercepted by Thea, who defeats Simon and seizes his camera's memory card. Back at the warehouse, Geronimo is shocked to be visited by Barry the Moustache, who was unhappy about being falsely accused of Sally's kidnapping. He captures Geronimo, Sally, and Trap, taking them to his tropical island mansion. Barry reveals that he wanted to thank Geronimo because while in prison, Barry ended up meeting an important business partner, allowing him to retire from crime and form an even more successful company. As thanks, Barry gives Geronimo the opportunity to interview him on his success story. However, for framing him for a staged kidnapping, Barry forces Sally to be the mascot of a humiliating commercial for his brand, Swiss-on-a-Pick.
6	"Paws Off, Cheddarface!"	Catherine Cuena & Patrick Regnard	Pier Di Già and Patrizia Nasi	September 24, 2009	TBA
In a strange event covered by newspapers around New Mouse City, Geronimo Stilton was seen publicly berating his friend, Chef Ricardo, before overthrowing a table and creating a mess. This ruined Geronimo's reputation as an image of him was posted on the Daily Rat. He was additionally accused of harassing other citizens around town. As Geronimo has no memory of committing these deeds, Geronimo was suspected of having a mental illness and placed on a strict cheese-free diet. Geronimo decides to further investigate the events. After receiving an anonymous tip, the Stiltons follow the clues he is given to a cheese factory at night. After splitting up, he follows the instructions into an elevator, but an impostor masquerading as Geronimo traps the real Geronimo in the elevator. The impostor leaves with the Thea and Trap. Meanwhile, after examining the image posted in the newspaper more closely, Benjamin discovers that the mouse in the newspapers was unlikely to be Geronimo, as he was carrying a copy of the Daily Rat in his pocket. Furthermore, when "Geronimo" returns to his house, Thea and Trap notice his suspicious, out-of-character behaviour. Although they deduce that he was an impostor most likely working for the Daily Rat, they decide not to expose him until they find more evidence. The real Geronimo escapes the cheese factory and calls Thea and Benjamin, confirming that the "Geronimo" in his house was indeed an impostor. The real Geronimo decides to go to the Daily Rat, pretending to be his own impostor, and ask Sally about his plans. Sally reveals that the impostor's plan was to go to Chef Ricardo's restaurant and eat Ricardo's food sculpture, named the Grand Cheese Masterpiece. The Stiltons decide to create a counter-strategy to expose the impostor and prevent Geronimo's reputation from being tarnished further. Before the unveiling of the Grand Cheese Masterpiece at the restaurant, Geronimo and Chef Ricardo collaborate to create a replica of the sculpture out of rubber squeaky toys. When the replica sculpture was unveiled, the impostor, mistaking it for the real sculpture, attempts to eat it. However, since the sculpture was inedible, the impostor failed to eat the art piece. After struggling, his mask accidentally falls off, exposing him as an impostor. Sally and Squealer, who were hiding among the audience, are also exposed as the masterminds of the plan, and the three of them are kicked out of the restaurant. Ricardo finally reveals the real sculpture, which was photographed by journalists. Sally was also photographed in the press assaulting the impostor for being exposed, tarnishing her reputation.
7	"Going Down to Chinatown"	Laurie Israel & Rachel Ruderman	Nicholas Moshini	TBA	TBA
Geronimo receives a letter in the mail dated forty years prior, implying it was addressed to the person who lived in Geronimo's house before him. Inside the envelope, he finds a piece of a treasure map with a marked X. The Stiltons decide to locate the treasure so they could return it to its owner, who is named Lewis Kenna on the map. While Geronimo, Trap and Benjamin search for the treasure, Thea and Pandora visit the library to look for Kenna using the reference books. Geronimo's group follows the map to a curiosity store in Chinatown. The store clerk gives them a second piece of the map. He also reveals that the map has been marked with glow-in-the-dark ink containing a cryptic clue that reads: “37 Stars over 112 Waves is where your next destination will be. Battle to find the singing bird and unearth all that you seek in life.” Geronimo decides to follow the second piece of the map on an ocean liner to China. While on the ocean liner, Geronimo discovers that the map's clue refers to coordinates. Geronimo follows the coordinates to Shanxi Province, home to Emperor Qin Xihuang's Terracotta Army. While visiting the historical site, Trap accidentally knocks over all the statues, revealing that the statues were fake and made of plaster as opposed to terracotta. One statue is marked with the insignia of the bird and contained the final map piece inside, which led to the Forbidden City in Beijing. Inside the Forbidden City, Geronimo's group finds the final clue inside a chest on top of a pagoda. This clue points to a floor tile marked with another bird insignia, revealing the treasure in a secret basement underneath. Despite this, the group is confused to find a blank notebook inside instead of any valuable items. Meanwhile, Thea and Pandora fail to find reference to any person with the name Lewis Kenna. Thea gets the idea that the name was spelled backwards, and the map was addressed to a woman named Anne K. Siwel. They track Siwel down and they travel together to reunite with Geronimo's group in Beijing. Siwel reveals that she was part of an adventure club which made treasure hunts in various locations around the world. The treasure hunt that Geronimo participated in was organized by the club. After concluding the investigation, Benjamin returns home in New Mouse City and writes about his trip to China. The episode ends by revealing to the viewers that there is actual treasure hidden a floor below the basement where the notebook was found.
8	"Hypno-Tick Tock"	Charlotte Fullerton	Pier Di Già and Patrizia Nasi	TBA	TBA
In the midst of his work, Geronimo begins sneezing, having allergies triggered by work-related stress. So, Trap brings Geronimo to Ratswami, a hypnotist who promises to treat his symptoms. Ratswami treats Geronimo, relieving him from his allergies, but secretly hypnotizes Geronimo into being his servant whenever he hears the word "Madagascar." When Geronimo awakens, he finds he has been cured of his allergies, but over the next few days, Geronimo begins feeling drowsy, oversleeping and falling asleep at work. Geronimo, Trap, and Benjamin begin investigating a string of thefts around New Mouse City, with Sally having covered the story before Geronimo because of his sleepiness. Investigating the crime scenes, they find most of the valuables in place, with only ordinary objects such as clocks and art supplies being stolen. However, as Trap and Benjamin take Geronimo to his bedroom to sleep, they find the stolen objects in his closet. Realizing Geronimo is the thief, they follow Geronimo around with Thea's help, but they find Geronimo has been sleepwalking as he steals, completely unaware of his actions. Despite their pleas, Geronimo climbs the clock tower with the items, but when Geronimo reaches the top, Trap mentions the word "Madagascar," freeing Geronimo from his trance. Geronimo descends the tower, but the Stiltons find Ratswami in a tent in the clock tower, discovering he had been controlling Geronimo to steal the items he needed. Using the mechanical parts, he causes the clock hands to spin rapidly like a hypnotic spiral, placing all the townspeople below under his control. Ratswami returns Geronimo to his trance, who attempts to drop Thea from the top of the tower, but the Stiltons then realize the word "Madagascar" frees Geronimo from his trance. As Thea and Trap fight with Ratswami over their control of Geronimo's mind, Benjamin examines the clock's mechanisms searching for a way to dismantle it. He stops the clock hands from spinning, but the minute hand catches Geronimo from his pajamas and leaves him suspended. This frees the townspeople below, but Ratswami quickly starts the mechanism again. However, Benjamin, realizing how the clock face is connected to the mechanism, pulls Geronimo from the minute hand, dislodging the clock face from its frame. As the mechanism malfunctions, the Stiltons flee as the clock tower explodes, sending Ratswami flying into a billboard where he is later arrested. Geronimo returns to work but catches a cold from robbing stores at night in his pajamas.
9	"Mask of the Rat-Jitsu"	Diane Morel	Jean Texier	TBA	TBA
Geronimo's office is visited by a masked ninja, who delivers a letter to him before disappearing. The letter is an invitation to the Circle of Honour, an extremely-exclusive martial arts championship between rat-jitsu, trained martial artists. Geronimo has been invited to the competition at a dojo at the top of Frozen Fur Peak. The Stiltons decide to visit the event. The Stiltons ride yaks up the mountain, at which point they are admitted into the dojo by a caretaker. A competition begins, but immediately after winning the match, the champion suddenly disappears. The kidnapper is unseen but Geronimo notices a red-hooded figure on the roof above. The caretaker explains that there has been a series of incidents at the dojo where fighters mysteriously disappeared while in the ring. Thea decides to join one of the matches disguised as a rat-jitsu. She wins an entire tournament, but after immediately following her victory, she disappears while on the arena. Geronimo decides to join the match just like Thea; he disguises himself as a rat-jitsu and manages to win a match, but also vanishes. Geronimo finds that he had taken into a secret arena just underneath the dojo. He discovers King King Pao, the leader of the red-hooded fighters. After being expelled from the dojo, Pao decided to create his own army of nin-jitsu by kidnapping champions from the dojo. Pao forces Geronimo to fight to the death against Thea for a spot in his army. Meanwhile, Trap attempts to steal food from the kitchen, but is caught by the dojo chef and is forced to do various chores around the kitchen. However, after hearing from Benjamin that Geronimo has gone missing, Trap decides to desert his position and search for Geronimo. In a hallway, he discovers a secret passage leading into the arena underneath. The dojo chef catches Trap, but chooses to side with him, leading a group of nin-jitsu down the passageway to confront the kidnapper. The chef and his army interrupt Geronimo and Thea's match and clash against Pao's army. Trap and Benjamin also release the imprisoned champions, who join the battle. Geronimo opens a vial of Goffenburg cheese, an extremely pungent cheese whose odour fills the room, causing Pao and his combatants to fall unconscious. The chef, who is revealed to be the leader of both the dojo and the nin-jitsu, forces a defeated Pao to work for him in the kitchen. After being declared the champion of the Circle of Honour, Geronimo returns to the Rodent's Gazette to cover the story. Trap opens the Goffenburg cheese, despite the Stiltons' warnings, causing the office windows to break and nearby trees to wilt due to its odor.
10	"Blackrat's Treasure"	Diane Morel	Riccardo Audisio	TBA	TBA
As part of his job, Geronimo decides to visit the New Mouse City pier to investigate sightings of a three-headed monster. The Stiltons find an authentic pirate ship docked at a pier. However, when they enter the ship to investigate, the ship sets sail with them on it. Geronimo discovers that the ship was the Briny Bones, the vessel of legendary pirate Blackrat. Despite Blackrat having disappeared while at sea, Blackrat appears at the helm, alive, and forces the Stiltons to act as his pirate crew. The Stiltons are forced to manage the ship, cleaning the decks. At night, Geronimo eavesdrops on Blackrat and learns that he had obtained a treasure map. Blackrat intended to kidnap the Stiltons to help him locate the treasure. Upon hearing the news, the Stiltons decide to seize the map to locate the treasure for themselves. While Blackrat is distracted, Geronimo sneaks into his quarters and locates the map. Despite this, Blackrat catches him and condemns him to walk the plank. At this point, the ship encounters rough waters and capsizes from the strong waves. The Stiltons, along with Blackrat, are marooned on a desert island. Despite being trapped, they landed on the island containing the treasure, so they search for the treasure. In the end, they locate the chest inside a cave. However, they are confused to find only a message congratulating them for completing the hunt. It was revealed that the entire treasure hunt, as well as the Stiltons' kidnapping and forced labour, were part of a pirate-themed cruise. Thea, Trap and Benjamin planned the cruise as a vacation for Geronimo. Once the vacation had concluded, Geronimo returns to the Rodent's Gazette to write about his trip.
11	"Intrigue on the Rodent Express"	Earl Kress	Pier Di Già and Lisa Arioli	TBA	TBA
Geronimo receives an exclusive interview from the reclusive Guru Mousarishi, who only grants one interview a decade. The Stiltons take the Rodent Express, where Geronimo meets author Agatha Moustie and her butler, Montague. However, Benjamin and Pandora run around the train playfully, angering the porter who threatens to expel them from the train. While hiding from him in the luggage car, they encounter a lion, scaring them away, and while running away, Benjamin notices Pandora has disappeared. Though Benjamin accuses the porter, Geronimo dismisses him as a suspect, seeing him walking away from the luggage car just before Pandora disappeared. The Stiltons search the luggage car, learning the "lion" is merely a statue on wheels. They now suspect Montague, realizing he has not been seen since Pandora's disappearance. Returning to the luggage car, they find Pandora locked in a trunk, who claims she was deliberately locked in. They confront Montague, but he flees and detaches the luggage car from the front of the train, causing the cars to separate. Thea and Pandora leap onto the front cars before the cars separate, while the others are left on the luggage car as it rolls backwards. Though the door is locked, Thea and Pandora climb over the train and find another way inside. They follow Montague to Moustie's suite, where they learn they are Simon and Sally in disguise, attempting to sabotage the Stiltons to secure the interview for themselves. However, Sally and Simon catch Thea and Pandora, restraining them with ropes and locking them in their suite as the train arrives at Mousarishi's house for the interview. Trap and Geronimo roll over the peak of a mountain, so they realize the only way to turn the train around is to change the tracks. Removing the lion statue's eye, they launch the eye at the lever, changing their path to the old tracks leading to the much more dangerous Tangle-Whiskers Gorge. This allows them to fly over the mountain and land near Mousarishi's house. The lion statue scares Sally and Simon away, Thea and Pandora are rescued, and Geronimo completes his interview with Mousarishi before reporting on it to the Rodent's Gazette.
12	"Mouse House of the Future"	Tom Mason & Dan Danko	Pier Di Già; Lisa Arioli & Patrizia Nasi	TBA	TBA
Geronimo is too busy to regulate all the details of his daily life, and does not take care of his house. Ben suggests that he hire a maid. Professor Cheesewheel, answers the advertisement. He proposes Geronimo should fully automate his house and procure a robot valet who will answer all his needs. Geronimo is not very convinced, but he agrees. As it turns out, it was also a way of distraction plotted by Sally that ends with Cheesewheel stealing an airship arriving in New Mouse City that Geronimo was also going to do an article on.
13	"Reported Missing"	Catherine Cuena & Patrick Regnard	Pier Di Già; Lisa Arioli & Patrizia Nasi	TBA	TBA
New Mouse City's museum is constantly haunted by African spirits. Wanting to make a report on this exhibit, Geronimo starts a journey in Africa with his friends. He wanted to discover the secret surrounding the disappearance of an adventurer who volatilized a site there long ago and whose traces have never been found.
14	"The Gem Gang"	Annetta Zucchi	Jean Texier	TBA	TBA
World renowned chess champion Gary Gouvov has to face a super-computer. This is the chess tournament of a lifetime! Fortunately for Geronimo, things are rather calm in New Mouse City. He can therefore afford to attend the event. During his absence, the Diamond Gang comes to perpetrate a series of crimes and Ben and Thea find themselves alone to investigate these crimes.
15	"Clean Sweep"	Eric Shaw	Davide Veca	TBA	TBA
While New Mouse City is affected by a wave of spectacular burglaries, Thea remains untraceable. It does not take more so that Sally will immediately put suspicion on her, which ruins the reputation of The Rodent's Gazette. Helped by Trap and Ben, Geronimo quickly discovers that the real culprit is none other than Prince Nogouda, an old acquaintance, and that the latter has been in search of a princess, in order to keep his title as prince of the Bandel Jungle.
16	"Mr. and Mrs. Matched"	Carin Greenberg Baker	Riccardo Audisio	TBA	TBA
Thea finds it unfortunate that her older brother is living a bachelor's life and decides to sign him up for a dating agency. But is it really a good idea?
17	"Top Model Thea"	Pierre Olivier	Paul Bénéteau	TBA	TBA
Under the seal of confidence, Geronimo is made aware of the latest news in the field of fashion by Philipilino, a renowned fashion designer. But Sally also tries to break the secret and tries various underhanded means to get it first. Geronimo will have to fight to defend his reputation.
18	"Attack of the Killer Whale"	Mathilde Maraninchi & Antonin Poirée	Jean Texier	TBA	TBA
Geronimo and his friends agreed to help Professor Ranobel in his research on the melting of the ice cap, so they embarked for the Arctic. But the crossing is far from being as calm as their ship is attacked by one of the most terrible creatures of the ocean, and the captain of the ship is not all as it seems.
19	"Cheese Connection"	Christel Gonnard	Pier Di Già; Lisa Arioli & Luca Fernicola	TBA	TBA
All the cheese of New Mouse City seemed to vanish. Even the cheese kept for emergencies! Geronimo is looking for a good shot. He finds himself not only in the heart of the cheese mystery, but face to face with a formidable criminal, who stole all the cheese and is intending to supply it to the city.
20	"Starring Geronimo"	Maud Loisillier and Diane Morel	Davide Veca	TBA	121
When a theater in New Mouse City struggles to keep afloat, Geronimo agrees to write a long article on their most recent show. But strange events that occur in the vicinity of the theater threaten the production.
21	"Rules of the Game"	Kurt Weldon	Pier Di Già; Luca Fernicola & Mita Odello	TBA	TBA
Benjamin and Pandora are invited to test a new video game platform. They quickly discover that they are then taken prisoner by the owner of the enterprise, who stole the game from what was initially thought to be an intruder, but in reality, was the original creator of the game. Geronimo, Trap and Thea rush to their rescue, but they too will have to fight for their lives.
22	"The Gator Samaritan"	Carin Greenberg Baker	Jean Texier	TBA	TBA
A benevolent hero multiplies his good deeds all over New Mouse City. But Geronimo is rather skeptical before so much eagerness... Especially when he realizes that his actions are only the fountain to feed Sally's paper, the Daily Rat.
23	"The Bad Luck of Team Fromage"	Tom Mason & Dan Danko	Pier Di Già; Lisa Arioli & Luca Fernicola	TBA	TBA
A cycling race goes through New Mouse City. For some time, the cycling champion Jacques Cheese, a friend of Geronimo, accumulates bad luck. The ace of the reporters intends to get to the bottom of things so that his friend can return in the race.
24	"Castle Creeps"	Maud Loisillier & Diane Morel	David Prince	March 16, 2010	TBA
Mr. Nibbles, the little hamster of Pandora, escaped. With Ben, she follows in his footsteps. They arrive at the castle Beaupelage, an old residence long forgotten and home to ghosts. There are noises to be heard. Our heroes search the property. They will find much more than a simple hamster...
25	"Smarty Pants"	Christel Gonnard	Rémy Brénot	March 17, 2010	TBA
Too busy to attend an experiment on intelligence, Geronimo delegates his cousin Trap. But a problem arises during the experiment, and Trap returns changed, so intelligent that it is really annoying. Our friends intend to bring back the old Trap, before this change becomes permanent!
26	"Tea Story"	Annetta Zucchi	Pier Di Già; Luca Fernicola & Mita Odello	March 18, 2010	TBA
Geronimo has just finished writing his latest book, The History of Tea, he decides to go himself to deliver his manuscript to his editor. While he is at the station, his briefcase is automatically exchanged with that of a secret agent serving a malicious government. Geronimo, who wants to recover his manuscript, embarks on a fierce pursuit that will take him to the four corners of the city.

=== Season 2 (2011–12) ===
No. overall	No. in season	Title	Written by	Storyboard by	Original release date	Prod. code
27	1	"Ravenrat"	Thomas Hart	Pierprincipio Di Già	October 24, 2011	TBA
Geronimo Stilton reunites with Professor Ravenrat, his old mentor from his days of the university for an interview, but gets a surprise of his intentions, he wants to wipe all out the information in the world for himself!
28	2	"The Great Jellybean Adventure"	Guy Vasilovich	Gilles Dayez	October 26, 2011	TBA
Benjamin and Trap win a trip to Egypt from a Jellybean themed contest, only to wander into a mess of trouble when they get lost in a pyramid...with an ancient curse.
29	3	"Bloodlines"	Denise Moss	Elisavet Armaou; Juilen Ducher	October 28, 2011	TBA
A message from a long Transratania (Transylvania), telling that there are vampires on a blood feast, but as Trap suspects that it is from their distant relatives.
30	4	"Sea Rats"	Diane Morel	Elisavet Armaou; Juilen Ducher	October 31, 2011	TBA
Geronimo Stilton is captured by pirates and is used as a hostage to an advantage of using the metamouse as a way to a sunken treasure.
31	5	"Chips and Dips"	Michael Rubiner	Elisavet Armaou; Juilen Ducher	November 2, 2011	TBA
When Benjamin helps a skater from a stalker, he ends up getting a secret recipe for a brand of potato chips, only to have Geronimo get kidnapped and forced by a business mouse Crunchrat to recreate it.
32	6	"Temple of the Dragon's Gasp"	Frédéric Valion	Elisavet Armaou; Juilen Ducher	November 4, 2011	TBA
While on vacation in South America, the Stiltons end up in a case dealing with a fire breathing dragon, only to find that Crunchrat is actually deforesting the entire Amazon to produce boxes for his chip making business.
33	7	"The Creepy Cowboy of the Cactus Gulch"	Tom Mason & Dan Danko	Elisavet Armaou; Olivier Grabias	TBA	TBA
The Stiltons help the mayor of Cactus Gulch deal with a ghost of a certain old enemy of the mayor's great grandfather, which also involves a plot about the existence of silver in Cactus Gulch's abandoned mines.
34	8	"The Emerald Chest"	Annetta Zucchi; Sylvie Barro	Elisavet Armaou; Olivier Grabias	TBA	TBA
Invited to Whiskeristan (Pakistan) by the new king, Liu Shi Mew, to broadcast an ancient race around the country, only to encounter a ploy not only to steal the artifacts, but also attempt to murder the new king.
35	9	"Chauncey and the Secret Cheese"	Adam Cohen	Elisavet Armaou; Olivier Grabias	TBA	TBA
Benjamin and Pandora win a trip to Chauncey's cheese factory only to get into a mystery of a new stolen cheese invention.
36	10	"The Cave Mouse"	Camille Vizzavona	Elisavet Armaou; Olivier Grabias	TBA	TBA
Geronimo suspects that a Cave Mouse that Sally covered in her story is fake, which it is proven fake, but then ends up trapped in the Cenozoic Mouse World.
37	11	"Say, Cheese!"	Bob Mittenthal	Elisavet Armaou; Erick Rémy	TBA	TBA
Trap becomes a model for a new fashion gazette, but it becomes a problem of unusual thefts in every part of the country he visits. Thea gets arrested for surfing on the beach in one of these places and becomes suspect for the thefts. Geronimo now must find the real culprit.
38	12	"The Mermaid Mouse"	Fabrice Ziolkowski	Elisavet Armaou; Erick Rémy	TBA	TBA
Trap falls for a mermaid that causes the ships to disappear into a whirlpool and all their belongings to vanish from them. Geronimo as usual during these circumstances tries to prove them wrong. Note: The mermaid mouse is similar to the sirens from Greek/Roman mythology, but the singing is similar to Jodi Benson's voice tone from Disney's The Little Mermaid when it was used to bait in the freighter ships. This was also one of Campbell Lane's last performances before he died of lung cancer on January 30, 2014.
39	13	"Lord Trap"	Michael Rubiner	Elisavet Armaou; Bich Pham	TBA	TBA
Trap becomes the sole heir to a castle in Scotland, but ends up participating in a feud between two clans.
40	14	"The Legend of Big Toes"	Baptiste Filleul	Elisavet Armaou; Erick Rémy	TBA	TBA
Big Toes (Bigfoot) is believed by Geronimo as a fake, but ends up finding more than a big footed monster but a tree that is sacred to the Algonquian mouse tribe that is endangered.
41	15	"The Disappearance of Nelson Napmouse"	Bob Mittenthal	Elisavet Armaou; Erick Rémy	TBA	TBA
Nelson Napmouse vanishes from the world to the Berguda Triangle (Bermuda Triangle), leaving Geronimo feared, but the real question is does he want to be found?
42	16	"Chase Trailor and the Golden Rodent"	Carina Rozenfeld	Elisavet Armaou; Xavier Lardy	TBA	TBA
A hero of mice comes to the Stiltons to find an idol only to realize he is actually a greedy con artist pretending to be him, meanwhile Trap deals with a mutt, which leads him to the real hero.
43	17	"The Incredible Shrinking Stiltons"	Adam Cohen	Elisavet Armaou; Anaïs Vincent	TBA	TBA
When an old enemy from the past comes to Geronimo Stilton's attention, he and Trap end up getting shrunk to the size of a pea.: Note: Thea does not appear in this episode.
44	18	"Dino-Mice"	Diane Morel	Lisa Arioli	TBA	218
A mad scientist tries to revive the most powerful creatures that lived 65 million years ago, while framing Geronimo Stilton in a diamond robbery.
45	19	"Pole Rat"	Frédéric Valion	Paolo Gattuso	TBA	TBA
The North Pole is melting away to nothing, and Trap believes it's aliens from outer space. Meanwhile, Geronimo uncovers another plan of Crunchrat, which turns out to be him teaming up with Professor Cheesewheel to build a ray that melts all the ice.
46	20	"Dude, Where's My Shark?"	Andy Rheingold; Amy Jackson	Pierprincipio Di Già	TBA	TBA
When a shark attacks a surfing contest, suspicions go to a certain surfer, while Trap enters the contest by pure luck.
47	21	"Magic Mice"	Fabrice Ziolkowski	Alberto Aloni	TBA	TBA
Two magicians blame each other for their magic tricks going wrong, but Geronimo might find a more logical explanation. Meanwhile, Trap tries to prove he has magic in his genes.
48	22	"Return to the Dojo"	Andy Rheingold; Amy Jackson	Pierprincipio Di Già	TBA	222
Crunchrat returns as the new head of the Dojo, but Geronimo has suspicions. Meanwhile, Benjarmin, Pandora and Trap are learning karate.
49	23	"The Fabumouse Fountain of Youth"	Michael Rubiner	Pierprincipio Di Già	TBA	TBA
A mysterious book comes to Pandora and Ben's attention, which might lead them into a great discovery or a wild goose chase that would ruin Geronimo's reputation.
50	24	"If I Could Talk to the Animals"	Camille Vizzavona	Luca Fernicola	TBA	TBA
Professor von Volt invents a communication device and must use it to prove the animals that not all mice are like the poachers.
51	25	"A Brief Engagement"	Adam Cohen; Bob Mittenthal	Lisa Arioli	TBA	TBA
Their Grandfather is getting married, but they might not like the bride.
52	26	"Parmezani Crush"	Annetta Zucchi; Sylvie Barro	Pierprincipio Di Già	April 16, 2012	TBA
Geronimo tries to prove to a superstitious opera singer that luck has nothing to do with her lost charm, meanwhile Trap deals with him having to throw out items from his house to avoid it collapsing. Notes: Another episode Thea is absent in, this episode was also the last episode co-produced by MoonScoop Group before that company was bought by Ellipsanime.

=== Season 3 (2016–17) ===
No. overall	No. in season	Title	Written by	Storyboard by	Original release date	Prod. code
53	1	"Van Mousling"	Jeffrey Paul Kearney	Luca Fernicola	October 8, 2016	TBA
Geronimo and his family hear of the three witches terrorizing the people in Scotland.
54	2	"Geronimo vs. the Weremouse"	Adam Long	Lisa Arioli	TBA	TBA
Geronimo and his family have gone to Transratania to have a report about a fashion show there. At the same time, a weremouse (werewolf) is trying to frame one of their distant relatives there to think that he is the weremouse.
55	3	"Off Road Rats"	Maria O'Loughlin	Abdel Raouf Zaidi	November 4, 2016	TBA
A famous tech company CEO's inventions gets lost in the desert due to thieves learning about through Geronimo's broadcast. Now the Stiltons must find it and battle Sally, Crunchrat, Prince Noguda and Ratswami.
56	4	"Double Trap"	Ciaran Murtaugh and Andrew Jones	Patrick Claeys, Olivier Schramm and Thomas Ferry	TBA	TBA
Professor von Volt invented a mouse copying device but Trap copies himself so he does not have to help out Geronimo to clean the office for inspection in 5 hours. He makes 4 copies, which has hilarious results when they try to help Geronimo.
57	5	"The Big Sleep"	Christopher Panzner	Frédérick Chaillou and Sophie Moulin	TBA	TBA
Geronimo finishes (somehow) his book in 5 days in hopes of winning the book of the year award. While he is successful, he falls into a deep sleep due to lack of sleep for the past 5 days. His family must somehow get through the day without revealing the fact the Geronimo is asleep.
58	6	"Trade Off"	Sam Dransfield	Luco Fernicola	TBA	TBA
Geronimo and Sally accidentally switch bodies in Von Volt's machine. Sally uses this fact to impersonate Geronimo and eventually kicks out his family from his office. Geronimo must do something about this before the change becomes permanent, and must stop Sally from selling the newspaper.
59	7	"Bantam of the Balcony"	Adam Long	Abdel Raouf Zaidi and Lisa Yokobori	TBA	TBA
A huge rooster (Bantam} is terrorizing the theater, putting it on the verge of shutdown. Geronimo, Thea, and Benjamin investigate, while Trap tries to get into a play.
60	8	"Cheese Raker"	Adam Long	Alberto Alvoni	TBA	TBA
Thea attempts to break a record for parasailing. However, Trap crashes the metamouse into a luxury boat, whose owner generously offers them to take them to a port. However, the Stiltons soon learn that the owner is planning something horrific, he wants to destroy all the cheese in the world by using a satellite that will be launched into space!
61	9	"Sorceress of the Bayou"	Ciaran Murtagh and Andrew Jones	Jean-Luc Serrano, Lisa Yokobori and Sophie Moulin	TBA	TBA
A professor disappeared on a bayou and Geronimo and his family need to investigate. But a sorceress tries to stop their investigation.
62	10	"Lights in the Desert"	Jeffrey Paul Kearney	Fabio Idali	TBA	TBA
A UFO has been seen in the desert and Geronimo and his family must investigate. Meanwhile, Trap brings gifts for the aliens.
63	11	"Guardians of the King"	Ciaran Murtagh and Andrew Jones	Patrick Claeys, Abdel Raouf Zaidi, Pierre Ledain and Lisa Yokobori	TBA	TBA
Thea is participating in a Karate Championship in Whiskiristan, judged by King Lu Shi Mu, Geronimo's old friend. However, the King also has a task for Geronimo, to find out why the Guardians of the King, clay statues, are coming alive.
64	12	"The Legend of Marzipan Island"	Fabrice Ziolkowski	Patrick Claeys, Abdel Raouf Zaidi and Lisa Yokobori	November 8, 2016	TBA
A strange monster is terroring beachgoers at Marzipan Island, and Geronimo investigates.
65	13	"Clowning Around"	Sandrine Joly	Jean-Luc Serrano, James Moreau and Pierre Ledain	TBA	TBA
A famous circus is in town and Geronimo goes there in hopes of a good story. However, the star attraction, Augusto the clown, has disappeared, and Geronimo must investigate.
66	14	"Lava or Leave Her"	Christopher Panzner	Luca Fernicola	TBA	TBA
Thea goes missing on a volcano about to erupt in Miceland (Iceland). Geronimo must now rescue his beloved sister.
67	15	"Snow Job"	Isabelle Destrez and Sophie Lodwitz	Dominique Monferry	TBA	TBA
The Winter Mouse Olympics is being held and Thea is participating. However, after 4 athletes are sabotaged, suspicion goes on to Thea. Geronimo now must prove that his sister is innocent.
68	16	"The Sword of Mousitomo"	Jean-Christophe Roger	Abdel Raoud Zaidi and Pierre Ledain	TBA	TBA
The head of the Mousitomo Clan invites Geronimo to help him recover the clan's stolen sword. Meanwhile, Trap wants to become a sumo wrestler.
69	17	"A Tall Order"	Emma David	Olivier Schramm and Luca Fernicola	TBA	TBA
A giraffe running through the streets wake up the Stiltons in the middle of the night. After getting it to safety in a vet, the Stiltons must investigate how it came into the city.
70	18	"A Mouse on the Moon"	Jean-Christophe Roger	Wilfrid Poma and Luca Fernicola	November 12, 2016	TBA
All because of Trap finding cheese in a space shuttle, he, Benjamin, and Pandora were sent into the moon and Geronimo and Thea must save them. Meanwhile, he discovered another plan of Crunchrat.
71	19	"The False Teeth Caper"	Yves Coulon	Lisa Arioli	TBA	TBA
Dentures have been stolen all over New Mouse City, and Geronimo, Grandpa Shortpaw, and Benjamin investigate while Thea helps Trap pick out a car.
72	20	"Virtual Vacation"	Sam Dransfield	Alberto Alvoni	TBA	TBA
Geronimo needs to take a rest and Professor von Volt invented the computer for a virtual vacation. Meanwhile, Sally made a problem with the computer.
73	21	"Skateboarding Championship"	Jean-Christophe Roger	Serge Ellissalde and Davide Veca	TBA	TBA
Geronimo, Thea, and Trap investigated a theft in the museum. At the same time, Benjamin and Pandora participated a skateboard racing competition.
74	22	"Ghost Bashers"	Ciaran Murtagh and Andrew Jones	Lisa Yokobori	TBA	TBA
A ghost busting team became famous in the city but Geronimo has suspicions about the ghosts while Thea has suspicions about the team. Meanwhile, Trap joins the team.
75	23	"The Mystery of Mancheco Island"	Sam Dransfield	Alberto Alvoni	TBA	TBA
Thea is sick, while Geronimo, Trap, Sally, Simon, and a famous explorer are stranded on a mysterious island.
76	24	"The Mouse Sitter"	Keiron Self and Giles New	Serge Ellissalde, Dominique Monferry and Pierre Ledain	TBA	TBA
Thea is babysitting a baby for a friend. Trap decides to take care of it, while Geronimo and Thea have to deal with the fact that Sally is stealing their scoops.
77	25	"Lights, Camera, Action!"	Ciaran Murtagh and Andrew Jones	Luca Fernicola	TBA	TBA
Someone stole a film trophy and Geronimo must investigate. At the same time, he and his family are making a movie.
78	26	"Junior Jack"	Fabrice Ziolkowski	Sophie Moulin	February 28, 2017	TBA
A famous video game developer's video game is stolen and Geronimo must investigate. Meanwhile, Trap decided to become a spy.
