= Geronimo Stilton (TV series) =

Animated TV series based on book series of the same name

- Also known as: The New Adventures of Geronimo Stilton (season 3)
- Genre: Action; Adventure; Comedy
- Based on: Geronimo Stilton by Elisabetta Dami
- Developed by: Pietro Marietti
- Directed by: Guy Vasilovich (seasons 1–2); Davide Veca (season 3); Nicolas Blard (season 3); Frédérick Chaillou (season 3)
- Voices of: Brian Drummond; Erin Mathews; Sarah Edmondson; Richard Ian Cox; Moneca Stori; Patricia Drake
- Theme music composer: Rémi Le Pennec (seasons 1–2); Valmont (season 3)
- Composers: Valmont; Lou Lussier (seasons 1 and 3); Bull Sheet Music (season 2); Yannis Dumoutiers (season 3); Marc Fournier (season 3); Yves Gourmeur (season 3)
- Countries of origin: Italy; France
- Original languages: Italian; English
- No. of seasons: 3
- No. of episodes: 78 (list of episodes)

Production
- Executive producers: Caterina Vacchi; Claudia Mazzucco; Pietro Marietti; Nicolas Atlan (seasons 1–2); Christophe di Sabatino (seasons 1–2); Liz Young (seasons 1–2); Jérémie Fajner (season 3); Clément Calvet (season 3)
- Producers: Karen K. Miller (seasons 1–2) Peter Anderson (seasons 1–2) Lucia Bolzoni (season 1) Caterina Gonnelli-Linden (season 2) Erica Pellegrini (seasons 2–3) Sonia Farnesi (seasons 2–3)
- Editors: Xana (seasons 1–2); Sabrina Abello (season 1); Agnès Wendling (season 1); Laure Charousset (season 1); Estelle Dhuisme (season 1); Marcel Molle (season 2); Ben and Satchi (season 3)
- Running time: 23 minutes
- Production companies: Atlantyca Entertainment Rai Fiction MoonScoop (seasons 1–2) Superprod Animation (season 3) Backup Media (season 3); In association with: B Media 2014 (season 3) Cofinova 5 (season 3)

Original release
- Network: Rai 2 (Italy); Rai Gulp (Italy); M6 (France, seasons 1–2); France 5 (France, season 3)
- Release: 15 September 2009 – 28 February 2017

Geronimo Stilton (also known as The New Adventures of Geronimo Stilton in season 3) is an animated series based on the Italian book series of the same name by Elisabetta Dami. The series is produced by Italian studios Atlantyca Entertainment and Rai Fiction, in co-production with French studio MoonScoop for the first two seasons and French studios Superprod Animation and Backup Media for season 3, with the participation of M6 for the first two seasons and France Télévisions for season 3, in association with B Media 2014 and Cofinova 5 for season 3.

The show debuted on Rai 2 in Italy on September 15, 2009, and it ran for 78 episodes across three seasons. The second season aired on October 24, 2011, and the third season on October 8, 2016, after which the show ended on February 28, 2017.

== Plot ==
Geronimo Stilton is about the titular character, a mouse journalist and head of the Geronimo Stilton Media Group. He searches New Mouse City and places around the world for new scoops while having adventures along the way with his nephew Benjamin, cousin Trap, sister Thea and Benjamin's friend Pandora Woz. Most episodes share no story connections and are generally self-contained, though some episodes feature ties and characters from others.

== Episodes ==
Season	Episodes	Originally released	
Season	Episodes	First released	Last released
1	26	September 15, 2009	March 18, 2010
2	26	October 24, 2011	April 16, 2012
3	26	October 8, 2016	February 28, 2017

== Characters ==
=== Main ===
- Geronimo Stilton

(voiced by Brian Drummond) is the publisher of The Rodent's Gazette, and also the president of the Geronimo Stilton Media Group. He is also the world chess champion after the events of the episode "Gem Gang". He is portrayed as extremely brave in the television series, even though in the books he was never depicted as valiant and has no glasses or vest under his jacket. Geronimo has a love of knowledge and has a sense of ethics and morals, but despite this, he is still a bit of a klutz. He leads one of the most successful publication groups in the world. Geronimo stars in the book and television series alongside his younger sister Thea Stilton, his prankster cousin Trap Stilton and his nephew Benjamin.

- Thea Stilton

(voiced by Sarah Edmondson) is Geronimo's younger sister and the special correspondent for The Rodent's Gazette. She flies the team in her all-terrain Metamouse, which can turn into a submarine, boat, airship, rocket ship/moon rover and SUV truck to locations that Thea, Trap, Benjamin, and Geronimo are exploring for stories and articles in The Rodent's Gazette. Thea is always ready to jump into action. She also a professional in martial arts, sports and drives a motorcycle and a helicopter which is also portrayed to the books.

- Trap Stilton

(voiced by Richard Ian Cox) is Geronimo and Thea's cousin. He lives in a trailer located in a beautiful park and is an expert chef, yet none of the meals he cooks up are tasty to Geronimo. He travels along with Geronimo when he's called on. Trap is a joker and loves to play tricks on others, especially Geronimo who he considers to be gullible. Still, he has a big heart and doesn't play jokes to be mean. He is also easily frightened, but is a martial artist too, he loves karate because the movie "Karate Mouse Power" is so amazing, and stops the enemies with his katanas.

- Benjamin Stilton

(voiced by Erin Mathews) is the 12-year-old nephew of Geronimo and Thea and is a hip near-genius at computers and electronics. He is dynamic and perk, although he can be impatient sometimes, and he loves skateboarding and sports. He works with his uncle at The Rodent's Gazette, running a computer news blog after school. He has a pet robot mouse named Max and is a gamer.

- Pandora Woz

(voiced by Moneca Stori) is Benjamin's best friend. She is very enthusiastic about the adventures Geronimo travels on, and she often comes along for the ride. She likes Thea because they share a similar high-spirited enthusiasm for life. Trap and Pandora also get along as well for both like to play pranks on Geronimo. She has a tendency to get distracted easily, which leads her into danger. Pandora also has a pet hamster, Mr. Nibbles. In the books, she is named "Bugsy Wugsy".

=== Recurring ===
- Sally Ratmousen (voiced by Patricia Drake) is the main recurring antagonist of the series. She is the publisher of The Daily Rat, The Rodent's Gazette's main competitor and rival. She is the primary cause of trouble for the Stilton crew when they are in New Mouse City, and she has a personal grudge against Geronimo.
- Simon Squealer (voiced by Brian Drummond) works for The Daily Rat as the personal assistant of Sally. He would do any dirty business for Sally. Simon protects his job at all costs, and goes to great lengths to dig up dirt on some famous mouse in New Mouse City.
- Chippy P. Crunchrat (voiced by David Kaye) is a very greedy and conniving businessman who is willing to do anything in his power to make his name in glory when his Chip franchise went downhill, and Geronimo Stilton has come across him several times and foiled his plots, but he usually escapes. He is the secondary main recurring antagonist from season two and onward, from kidnapping Geronimo (Chips and Dips) to causing national disasters in South America (Temple of the Dragons Gasp) to melting the Arctic circle (Pole Rat).
- Professor von Volt (voiced by Lee Tockar) is a scientist, inventor, and an old friend of Geronimo. He invented Benjamin's Benpad and rebuilt his robotic mouse. He always stays in his lab to have some experiments and sometimes like to help Geronimo whenever he is free. He is a recurring character from inventing a time machine (The Cave Mouse) to a translating device (If I Could Talk to the Animals). He also invented many other such as the Mind Mingler (Trade off) and a copier (Double Trap).
- Ratswami (voiced by Alistair Abell) is an antagonistic hypnotist for New Mouse City. He once hypnotized the people of New Mouse City in (Hypno-Tick Tock). He is one of the recurring characters in season one when he hypnotized Geronimo to be his servant, which he was framed as a suspect to an overnight robbery. He also hypnotized Geronimo's grandfather (William Shortpaws) to marry Sally so she can take over The Rodents Gazette (A Brief Engagement).
- Prince Nogouda (voiced by Trevor Devall) is a germophobic antagonist who lives in a palace in the Bandell jungle. It is revealed in (Operation Shufongfong) that he captured rare animals from all over the world including two rare lizards. In (Clean Sweep) him and his guards captured Thea to marry him and be his Princess in order to save his wealth and riches before it's too late.
- Professor Cheesewheel (voiced by Scott McNeil) is a mad scientist and robotics inventor who had schemed to steal a technologically advanced airship (Mouse House of the Future), steal and sell the intelligence of the world's smartest people (Smarty Pants) and helping Crunchrat melt the Arctic circle (Pole Rat).
- William Shortpaws (voiced by Scott McNeil) is Geronimo's grandfather, and former owner of The Rodents Gazette as he started his newspaper empire by selling newspapers as a child. Currently, he oversees Geronimo's operation of his company, and he knows exactly the way he wants things to be. Occasionally, when Geronimo least expects it, he drops into The Rodent's Gazette to check on how he is doing even though he has retired.
- Shadow (voiced by Kathleen Barr) is New Mouse City's most notorious thief and a master of disguise, and Geronimo has crossed paths against her when she was disguised as a mummy (The Mummy with No Name) and later working for Sally to get the scoop on a new fashion fabric (Top Model Thea).
- Bree Cheeserind (voiced by Sam Vincent) is a big celebrity actor Pandora is obsessed with who has been in a few of Geronimo Stilton's adventures. He's also kind, generous and a nature lover, as shown in (Temple of the Dragon's Gasp), as he is against the destruction of the forest by Chippy P. Crunchrat.
- Philipilino (voiced by Trevor Devall) is a very famous fashion designer who has crossed paths with Geronimo on some occasions.
- King Liu Shi Mew (voiced by Sam Vincent) is a young and modern trend lifestyle king who is the royal highness of Whiskeristan and a very close and good friend with the Stiltons.
- The Ratoff family who are distant relatives of the Stiltons that live in Transratania who meet up with them whenever they travel there.
- The Rat-Jitsu Clan are a special group of martial artists and ninjas who are very close friends with Geronimo and his family in which they were also inducted into as members after saving their clan and Master Caretaker's life twice.

== Production ==
Geronimo Stilton is produced by Atlantyca and Rai Fiction in Italy, MoonScoop in France for seasons 1–2, and Superprod and Back UP Media in France in season 3. On April 15, 2010, it was announced that the series would continue with a second season of 26 episodes, which premiered in Italy on October 24, 2011. A third season was announced on February 6, 2013, and on October 14, 2014, it was announced that France-based studios Superprod Animation and Backup Media would help with the production instead with the former taking over production from MoonScoop (who went bankrupt in early 2014).

The series was animated using Toon Boom Harmony. The animation was outsourced to Toon City Animation, Snipple Animation for seasons 1–2 and Top Draw Animation for season 3 located in the Philippines, and Dong Woo Animation for season 2 located in South Korea.

== Release ==
=== Broadcast ===
Geronimo Stilton debuted on Rai 2 in Italy on September 15, 2009, and later the show premiered on Rai Gulp. The series aired on Ici Radio-Canada Télé and YTV in Canada, M6 in France, Cartoon Network in Spain, Okto in Singapore, Nickelodeon in the Netherlands, Belgium, Denmark, and Sweden, NTV7 in Malaysia,, Sun Network in India, e-Junior in the United Arab Emirates, Eleven in Australia in July, TVNZ in New Zealand, and TVB Pearl in Hong Kong. In the United States, the series was added to Kabillion's VOD service. In the United Kingdom and other countries in Europe, the series was streamed on the Nintendo 3DS on February 6, 2017. The third season debuted on Knowledge in Canada on June 30, 2018. The series was also available on Netflix, however, the show has been removed from Netflix as of 2022. Currently, the first 2 seasons are available to watch on Amazon Prime Video.

=== Home media ===
Imavision released the first two seasons on DVD in both English and French in Canada between 2010 and 2013. Their successor, Unidisc, distributed the third season in 2017.

In the United States, Entertainment One released 16 episodes from the first season across four DVDs release between 2013 and 2015.

In Australia, the first season was spread across four DVD volumes and distributed by a joint venture by Universal & Sony Pictures Home Entertainment in 2014.

In 2013, the show's trailer was on YouTube Movies in both Canada and the USA, which showcased the season one collection, as well as the first episode ("Operation Shufongfong").

Region 1
DVD title	Season(s)	Aspect ratio	Episode count	Publisher	Release date(s)
Volume 1	1	16:9	13	Imavision	August 24, 2010
Volume 2	1	16:9	13	Imavision	March 29, 2011
Volume 3	2	16:9	13	Imavision	August 21, 2012
Volume 4	2	16:9	13	Imavision	March 12, 2013
Operation Shufongfong	1	16:9	4	Entertainment One	September 24, 2013
Intrigue on the Rodent Express	1	16:9	4	Entertainment One	February 2, 2014
Going Down to Chinatown and Other Adventures	1	16:9	4	Entertainment One	July 22, 2014
Top Model Thea	1	16:9	4	Entertainment One	February 17, 2015
Volume 5	3	16:9	13	Unidisc	June 30, 2017
Volume 6	3	16:9	13	Unidisc	October 10, 2017

Region 4
DVD title	Season(s)	Aspect ratio	Episode count	Total running time	Release date(s)
Operation Shufongfong and Other Fun Filled Escapades	1	16:9	7	TBA	September 25, 2014
Intrigue on the Rodent Express and Other Fun Filled Escapades	1	16:9	6	TBA	June 11, 2014
The Gem Gang and Other Fun Filled Escapades	1	16:9	7	TBA	October 29, 2015
Rules of the Game and Other Fun Filled Escapades	1	16:9	6	TBA	October 29, 2015

== Reception ==
=== Critical response ===
Emily Ashby of Common Sense Media rated Geronimo Stilton 4 out of 5 stars, stating the series "[engages] kids in characters who star in a TV show and a book series and giving families a reason to enjoy their stories in both formats together."

=== Awards and nominations ===
Year	Award	Category	Nominee(s)	Result	Ref.
2010	Cartoons On the Bay, Pulcinella Awards	TV series for Kids	Geronimo Stilton	Nominated	
