= Geronimo Stilton =

Italian children's book series

- Author: Elisabetta Dami
- Original title: Geronimo Stilton
- Country: Italy
- Language: Italian
- Genre: Children's literature; adventure fiction; comedy
- Publisher: Dami Editore; Edizioni Piemme; Scholastic Corporation (US); Sweet Cherry Publishing (UK)
- Published: 1997 (Dami Editore); 2000 (Edizioni Piemme)
- Published in English: 2004
- Website: geronimostilton.com

Geronimo Stilton is an Italian illustrated chapter book series created by Elisabetta Dami. The books are written as the fictional memoirs of the title character, a mild-mannered mouse who keeps getting into faraway adventures in both fictional and real locations. The books are illustrated and distributed in full color, and important words are shown in colorful, illustrative typefaces.

The series, combined with many spin-off series, has sold over 180 million copies worldwide. It has also been adapted into an animated television series of the same name, theatrical shows, video games, and graphic novels. Scholastic Corporation began publishing the English version of the series in the US in February 2004. In the UK, the English books are published by Sweet Cherry Publishing. In 2025, the book series was acquired by Italian animation studio Rainbow.

== Creation ==
In the 1990s, Elisabetta Dami found herself unable to have children, so she chose to volunteer at children's hospitals. Inspired by Patch Adams, who participates in Clown Care, she told humorous and adventurous stories starring the character of Geronimo Stilton and teaching morals to entertain patients. They appeared to love the stories, which would lead to her writing and publishing such stories.

"This character was born from my heart to bring me closer to a dream I sadly was not able to fulfil: that of having children. ... I started doing volunteer work with sick children. It was at the time when an American doctor called Patch Adams taught us that children need to laugh in order to recover ... I invented and told funny stories about a clumsy mouse that had lots of adventures, with twists in the plots and guaranteed happy endings. I wanted to entertain children, see their eyes bristling with joy and create a bridge toward enchantment. It was already Geronimo, the shy mouse that ... naturally, as a firm believer in teamwork, ended up calling on the help of his many friends. Thanks to him I became a mum to millions of children and experienced the friendship that helps one achieve everything, as well as honesty and sincerity that instill value in every single gesture, not to mention the curiosity and sense of adventure that keep you going."

— Elisabetta Dami.

== Characters ==
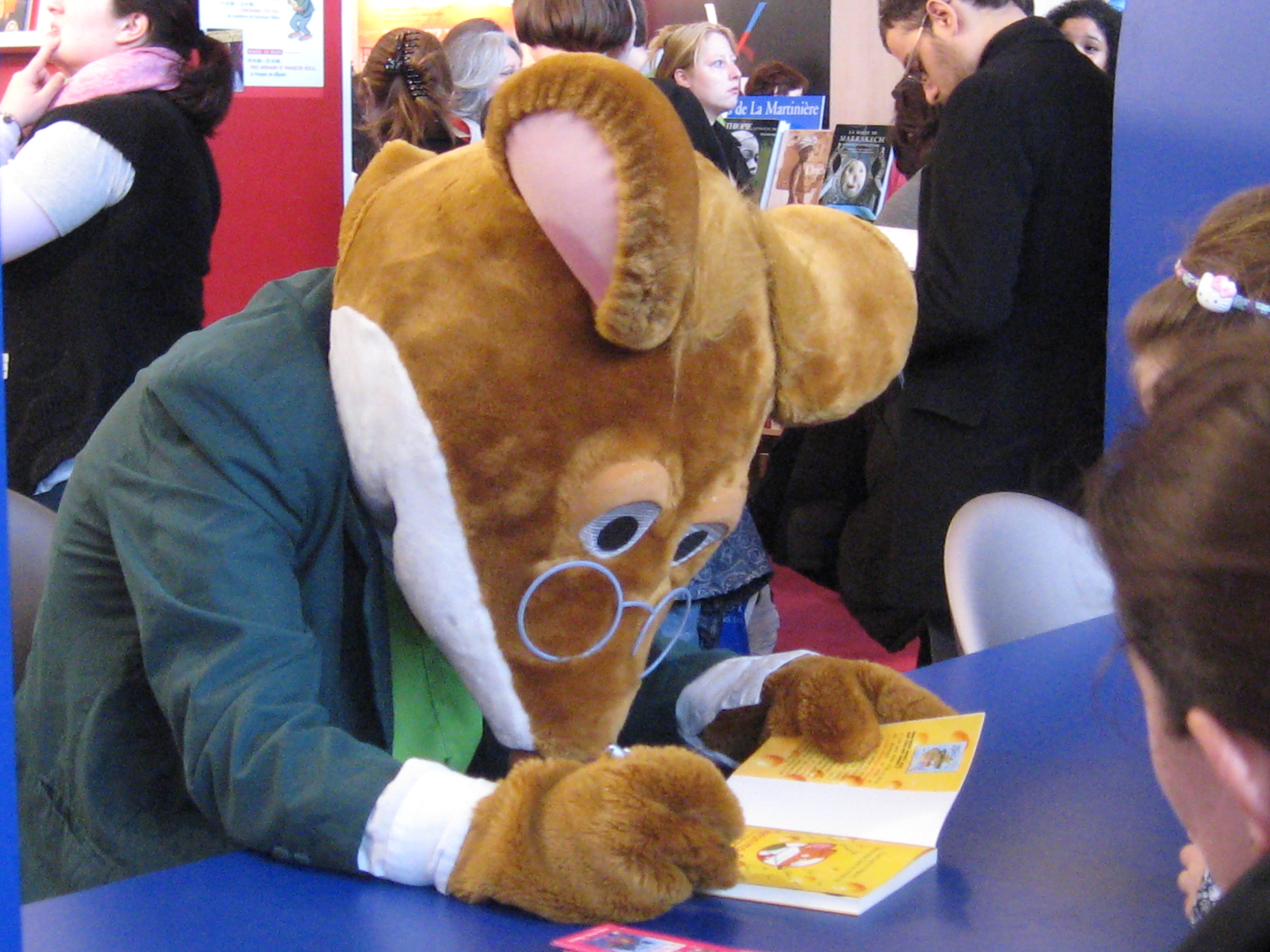
Performer in Geronimo Stilton suit at an autograph session

- Geronimo Stilton is the protagonist, and editor and publisher for The Rodent's Gazette, the most famous newspaper on New Mouse Island. He has a love of knowledge and has a strong sense of ethics and morals. Geronimo doesn't like to go on adventures with his family and friends, although he is passionate about writing adventure stories, which sell well in-universe. He was adopted by the Stilton family when he was young.
- Thea Stilton is Geronimo's younger sister and special correspondent for The Rodent's Gazette. Thea taught a journalism class at Mouseford Academy to five mice, Nicky, Colette, Violet, Paulina, and Pamela, who would name their group after her as the Thea Sisters and chronicle adventures of their own in the Thea Stilton series. She was also adopted by the Stilton family when she was young with her biological brother, Geronimo Stilton.
- Trap Stilton is Geronimo's cousin who travels along with him when he's called on. He is the owner of the thrift store Cheap Junk for Less and is often mentioned as a chef. He loves to tell jokes and play pranks, and often annoys Geronimo with his antics.
- Benjamin Stilton is Geronimo and Thea's young 9-year-old nephew and often comes along with him on his many adventures.
- William Shortpaws (originally Torquato Travolgiratti), also known as Cheap Mouse Willy, is the founder of The Rodent's Gazette and Geronimo's grandfather. He adopted Geronimo and Thea Stilton when they were young.
- Aunt Sweetfur is Geronimo's aunt, who lives with Benjamin.
- Sally Ratmousen is the main antagonist and publisher of The Daily Rat, the biggest competitor of The Rodent's Gazette. Her grandmother, Molly Ratmousen, founded The Daily Rat at the same time as The Rodent's Gazette's founding.
- Creepella von Cacklefur (originally Tenebrosa Tenebrax)is an enchanting and mysterious mouse who lives in Mysterious Valley and works both as a special effects designer for scary films and haunted houses and as a journalist. She is the protagonist of her own spin-off series with the same name. She has a crush on Geronimo.
- Professor Paws von Volt is a scientist and Geronimo's friend.
- Hercule Poirat (a pun on Hercule Poirot, original name Noseymouse Squeak / Ficcanasso Squit) is Geronimo's childhood friend and the private investigator of New Mouse City, bringing him on many of his cases. He has a crush on Geronimo's sister, Thea.
- Petunia Pretty Paws (original name Patty Spring) is a TV reporter and an environmentalist, whom Geronimo has a crush on. She also has a pesky niece named Bugsy Wugsy.
- Wolfgang Wild Paws: is Petunia's twin brother and a TV producer, who is also an environmentalist.
- Pinky Pick is Geronimo's 12 year-old assistant editor at The Rodent's Gazette. She is an expert in computers and follows the latest trends.
- Tina Spicytail is a skilled cook for the Stilton family.
- Bruce Hyena (originally just Hyena/Iena)is a parachutist, adventurer, and Geronimo's adventurous friend who likes to sign him up on many crazy adventures. He also has a crush on his sister, Thea.
- Shorty Tao is Bruce Hyena's cousin, the managing editor of The Rodent's Gazette, and she has a little brother, Baby Tao.
- The Paws family lived on a farm for many generations in the Giant Sequoia Valley, in Dolphin Bay. They are good friends with the Stiltons.
  - Bugsy Wugsy (original name Pandora Woz/Spring) is the daughter of John Wugsy and Furry Paws and Benjamin's best friend.
  - Grandfather Paws is well-versed in natural sciences and once travelled the world in search of rare butterflies.
  - Grandmother Paws at a young age, she travelled all over the world when planes were not built yet.
  - Teddy Paws is the son of Grandfather and Grandmother Paws and brother of Bobby Paws.
  - Jenny Littlepaw is Teddy's wife.
  - Tom Paws is the son of Teddy and Jenny.
  - Lucy Vally is Tom's wife.
  - Lilly, Lally, and Lolly Paws are the daughters of Lucy and Tom. Lilly is five, Lally is seven, and Lolly is eleven.
  - Bobby Paws is the son of Grandfather and Grandmother Paws and brother of Teddy Paws.
  - Suzy Rattella is Bobby's wife.
  - Furry Paws is the daughter of Bobby and Suzy and sister of Petunia and Wolfgang.
  - John Wugsy is Furry's husband.
- The Shadow is a recurring antagonist, Sally Ratmousen's cousin and one of Mouse Island's most notorious criminals. She is a master thief and master of disguise who usually seduces Geronimo during their encounters.
- Champ Strongpaws is a friend of Geronimo who also likes to sign him up for adventures.
- Kornelius von Kickpaw, code name OOK, is Geronimo's childhood friend and a secret agent for the government of Mouse Island. He has a sister, Veronica von Kickpaw, who is also a secret agent and works under the code name OOV.
- Wild Willie is an archaeologist and adventurous friend of Geronimo and Bruce Hyena. He takes Geronimo on some adventures.
- Madame No is a recurring antagonist in the later books. She is the greedy, wealthy CEO of EGO Corp (Enormousely Gigantic Organisation Corporation) whose criminal endeavors often lead to her clashing with Geronimo and his friends.

== Books ==
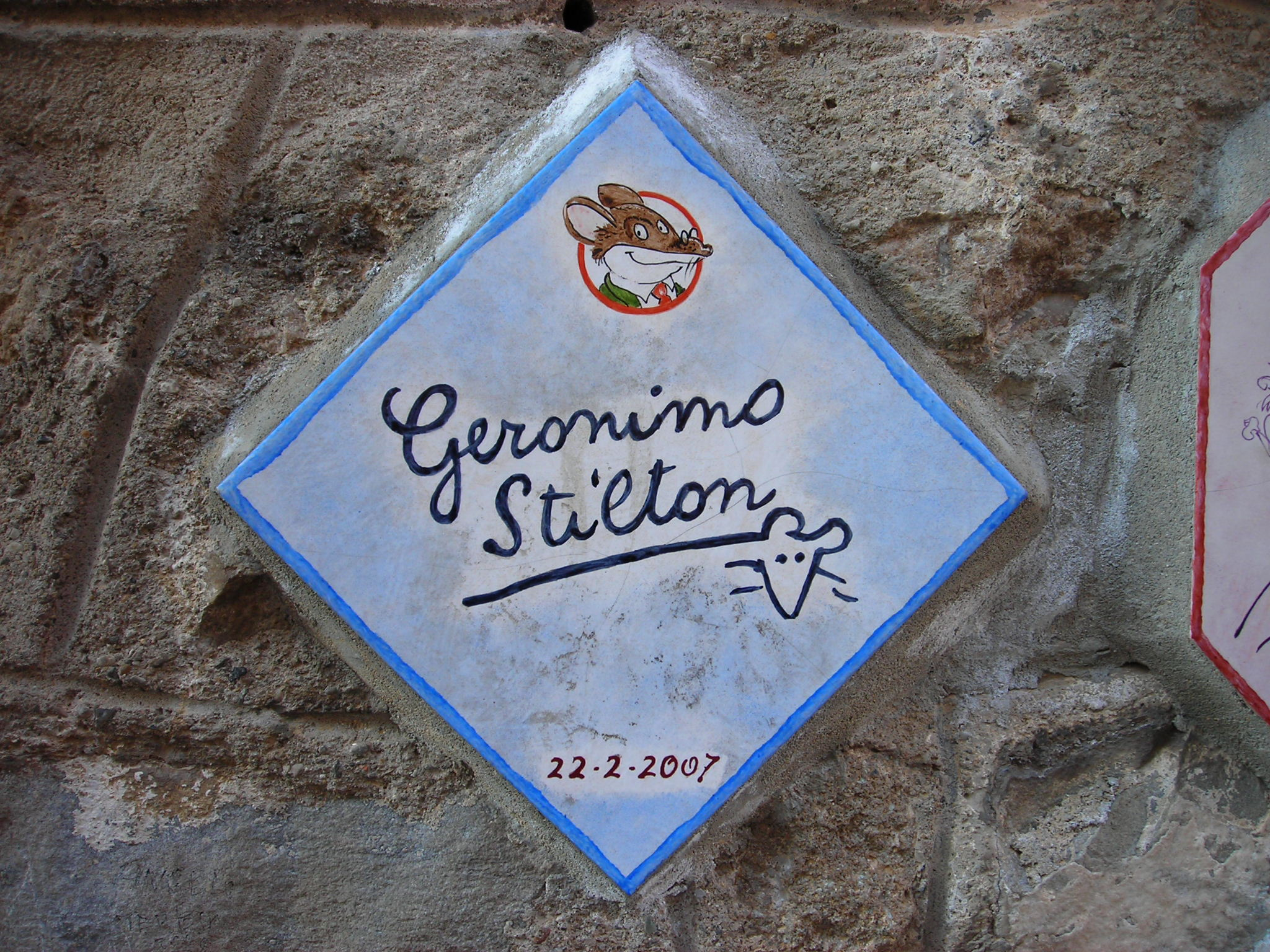
Tile of the muretto in Alassio

Not all books and series are listed; unless noted, the following are ones that have been or announced to be published in English.

=== Geronimo Stilton ===
1. Lost Treasure of the Emerald Eye (February 2004, originally published in 1997 in Italy as Il mistero dell'occhio di smeraldo) (ISBN 978-0-439-55963-8)
2. The Curse of the Cheese Pyramid (February 2004, originally published in 2000 in Italy as Il mistero della piramide di formaggio) (ISBN 978-0-545-39157-3)
3. Cat and Mouse in a Haunted House (February 2004, originally published in 2000 in Italy as Il castello di Zampaciccia Zanzamiao) (ISBN 978-0-439-55965-2)
4. I'm Too Fond of My Fur! (February 2004, originally published in 2000 in Italy as Ci tengo alla pelliccia, io!) (ISBN 978-0-439-55966-9)
5. Four Mice Deep in the Jungle (March 2004, originally published in 2000 in Italy as Quattro topi nella giungla nera) (ISBN 978-0-439-55967-6)
6. Paws Off, Cheddarface! (April 2004, originally published in 2000 in Italy as Giù le zampe, faccia di fontina!) (ISBN 978-0-545-39168-9)
7. Red Pizzas for a Blue Count / Fangs and Feasts in Transratania (May 2004, originally published in 1997 in Italy as Una granita di mosche per il Conte) (ISBN 978-0-439-55969-0)
8. Attack of the Bandit Cats / Attack of the Pirate Cats (June 2004, originally published in 1997 in Italy as Il galeone dei Gatti Pirati) (ISBN 978-0-439-55970-6)
9. A Fabumouse Vacation for Geronimo / A Fabumouse Holiday for Geronimo (July 2004, originally published in 2002 in Italy as Quella stratopica vacanza alla pensione Mirasorci...) (ISBN 978-0-439-55971-3)
10. All Because of a Cup of Coffee / Hang on to Your Whiskers (August 2004, originally published in 1999 in Italy as Tutta colpa di un caffè con panna) (ISBN 978-0-439-55972-0)
11. It's Halloween, You 'Fraidy Mouse! (September 2004, originally published in 2001 in Italy as Halloween...che fifa felina!) (ISBN 978-0-439-55973-7)
12. Merry Christmas, Geronimo! (October 2004, originally published in 2000 in Italy as È natale, Stilton!) (ISBN 978-0-439-55974-4)
13. The Phantom of the Subway / The Ghost of the Underground (November 2004, originally published in 2000 in Italy as Il Fantasma del Metrò) (ISBN 978-0-439-66162-1)
14. The Temple of the Ruby of Fire / The Temple of the Fire Ruby (December 2004, originally published in 2003 in Italy as Il tempio del rubino di fuoco) (ISBN 978-0-439-66163-8)
15. The Mona Mousa Code (January 2005, originally published in 1997 in Italy as Il sorriso di Monna Topisa) (ISBN 978-0-439-66164-5)
16. A Cheese-Colored Camper / A Cheese-Colored Camper Van (February 2005, originally published in 2000 in Italy as Un camper color formaggio) (ISBN 978-0-439-69139-0)
17. Watch Your Whiskers, Stilton! / The Mystery of the Roaring Rat (March 2005, originally published in 2001 in Italy as Attenti ai baffi...arriva Topogoni!) (ISBN 978-0-439-69140-6)
18. Shipwreck on the Pirate Islands / Shipwreck on Pirate Island (April 2005, originally published in 2003 in Italy as L'isola del tesoro fantasma) (ISBN 978-0-439-69141-3)
19. My Name Is Stilton, Geronimo Stilton (May 2005, originally published in 1999 in Italy as Il mio nome è Stilton, Geronimo Stilton) (ISBN 978-0-439-69142-0)
20. Surf's Up, Geronimo! (June 2005, originally published in 2000 in Italy as L'hai voluta la vacanza, Stilton?) (ISBN 978-0-545-39205-1)
21. The Wild, Wild West (July 2005, originally published in 2005 in Italy as Quattro topi nel Far West!) (ISBN 978-0-439-69144-4)
22. The Secret of Cacklefur Castle (August 2005, originally published in 2002 in Italy as Il segreto della Famiglia Tenebrax) (ISBN 978-0-439-69145-1)
23. Valentine's Day Disaster (January 2006, originally published in 2005 in Italy as La vita e un rodeo!) (ISBN 978-0-439-69147-5)
24. Field Trip to Niagara Falls / School Trip to Niagara Falls (March 2006, originally published in 2005 in Italy as In campeggio alle cascate del Niagara) (ISBN 978-0-545-39222-8)
25. The Search for Sunken Treasure (June 2006, originally published in 2000 in Italy as Il misterioso del tesero scomparso) (ISBN 978-0-439-84116-0)
26. The Mummy with No Name (August 2006, originally published in 2005 in Italy as La mummia senza nome) (ISBN 978-0-439-84117-7)
27. The Christmas Toy Factory (October 2006, originally published in 2006 in Italy as Il mistero degli elfi) (ISBN 978-1-78226-369-2)
28. Wedding Crasher (January 2007, originally published in 1999 in Italy as Benvenuti a Rocca Taccagna) (ISBN 978-0-545-39240-2)
29. Down and Out Down Under (March 2007, originally published in 2006 in Italy as È arrivata Patty Spring!) (ISBN 978-0-545-39242-6)
30. The Mouse Island Marathon (June 2007, originally published in 2004 in Italy as La maratona piu pazza del mondo!) (ISBN 978-0-439-84121-4)
31. The Mysterious Cheese Thief (August 2007, originally published in 2005 in Italy as Il misterioso ladro di formaggi) (ISBN 978-0-439-02312-2)
32. Valley of the Giant Skeletons (January 2008, originally published in 2006 in Italy as La valle degli scheletri giganti) (ISBN 978-0-545-02132-6)
33. Geronimo and the Gold Medal Mystery (April 2008, originally published in 2004 in Italy as Lo strano caso dei Giochi Olimpici) (ISBN 978-0-545-02133-3)
34. Geronimo Stilton, Secret Agent (July 2008, originally published in 2007 in Italy as Agente segreto Zero Zero Kappa) (ISBN 978-0-545-39346-1)
35. A Very Merry Christmas (October 2008, originally published in 2007 in Italy as Inseguimento a New York!) (ISBN 978-0-545-02135-7)
36. Geronimo's Valentine (January 2009, originally published in 2007 in Italy as Lo strano caso del tiramisu) (ISBN 978-0-545-02136-4)
37. The Race Across America (April 2009, originally published in 2006 in Italy as La Corsa Piu Pazza d'America) (ISBN 978-0-545-02137-1)
38. A Fabumouse School Adventure / A Fantastic School Adventure (July 2009, originally published in 2008 in Italy as Ore 8: a scuola di formaggio!) (ISBN 978-0-545-39353-9)
39. Singing Sensation (October 2009, originally published in 2004 in Italy as Lo strano caso del sorcio stonato) (ISBN 978-0-545-39354-6)
40. The Karate Mouse (January 2010, originally published in 2005 in Italy as Te le do io il karate) (ISBN 978-0-545-10369-5)
41. Mighty Mount Kilimanjaro (April 2010, originally published in 2004 in Italy as Che fifa sul Kilimangiaro!) (ISBN 978-0-545-39356-0)
42. The Peculiar Pumpkin Thief (July 2010, originally published in 2003 in Italy as Lo strano caso della Torre Pagliaccia) (ISBN 978-0-545-10372-5)
43. I'm Not a Supermouse! (October 2010, originally published in 2008 in Italy as Non sono un supertopo!) (ISBN 978-0-545-10375-6)
44. The Giant Diamond Robbery (January 2011, originally published in 2008 in Italy as Il Furto del Diamante Gigante) (ISBN 978-1-78226-949-6)
45. Save the White Whale! (April 2011, originally published in 2007 in Italy as Salviamo la Balena Bianca!) (ISBN 978-0-545-39360-7)
46. The Haunted Castle (July 2011, originally published in 2007 in Italy as Ritorno a Rocca Taccagna) (ISBN 978-0-545-10374-9)
47. Run for the Hills, Geronimo! (October 2011, originally published in 2009 in Italy as Il tesoro delle Colline Nere) (ISBN 978-0-545-33132-6)
48. The Mystery in Venice (January 2012, originally published in 2009 in Italy as Il mistero della gondola di cristallo) (ISBN 978-0-545-34097-7)
49. The Way of the Samurai (April 2012, originally published in 2010 in Italy as Il segreto dei tre samurai) (ISBN 978-0-545-34101-1)
50. This Hotel Is Haunted! (July 2012, originally published in 2005 in Italy as Lo strano caso del Fantasma al Grand Hotel) (ISBN 978-0-545-34102-8)
51. The Enormouse Pearl Heist (October 2012, originally published in 2009 in Italy as Il mistero della perla gigante) (ISBN 978-0-545-34103-5)
52. Mouse in Space! (February 2013, originally published in 2011 in Italy as S.O.S. C'e un topo nello spazio!) (ISBN 978-0-545-48191-5)
53. Rumble in the Jungle (April 2013, originally published in 2011 in Italy as Grosso guiao in Mato Grosso) (ISBN 978-0-545-48193-9)
54. Get Into Gear, Stilton! (July 2013, originally published in 2011 in Italy as Ingrana la marcia, Stilton!) (ISBN 978-0-545-53937-1)
55. The Golden Statue Plot (October 2013, originally published in 2009 in Italy as Attacco alla statua d'oro!) (ISBN 978-0-545-55629-3)
56. Flight of the Red Bandit (January 2014, originally published in 2012 in Italy as Dov'e sparito Falco Rosso?) (ISBN 978-0-545-55630-9)
57. The Stinky Cheese Vacation (July 2014, originally published in 2012 in Italy as Ma che vacanza... a Rocca Taccagna!) (ISBN 978-0-545-55631-6)
58. The Super Chef Contest (October 2014, originally published in 2012 in Italy as La gara dei Supercuochi) (ISBN 978-1-78226-373-9)
59. Welcome to Moldy Manor (January 2015, originally published in 2013 in Italy as Una tremenda vacanza a Villa Pitocca!) (ISBN 978-0-545-74740-0)
60. The Treasure of Easter Island (July 2015, originally published in 2013 in Italy as Il tesoro di Rapa Nui) (ISBN 978-93-5103-909-9)
61. Mouse House Hunter (October 2015, originally published in 2012 in Italy as Geronimo cerca casa) (ISBN 978-0-545-83554-1)
62. Mouse Overboard! (January 2016, originally published in 2014 in Italy as Allarme...topo in mare!) (ISBN 978-1-78226-366-1)
63. The Cheese Experiment (July 2016, originally published in 2013 in Italy as Lo strano caso dei brufoli blu) (ISBN 978-1-78226-372-2)
64. Magical Mission (October 2016, originally published in 2011 in Italy as Appuntamento...col mistero!) (ISBN 978-1-78226-804-8)
65. Bollywood Burglary (January 2017, originally published in 2015 in Italy as Il mistero del rubino d'Oriente) (ISBN 978-1-338-08775-8)
66. Operation: Secret Recipe (July 2017, originally published in 2015 in Italy as Operazione panettone) (ISBN 978-0-606-40185-2)
67. The Chocolate Chase (October 2017, originally published in 2016 in Italy as Lo strano caso del ladro di cioccolato) (ISBN 978-1-338-15915-8)
68. Cyber-Thief Showdown (January 2018, originally published in 2010 in Italy as C'è un pirata in Internet) (ISBN 978-1-338-21520-5)
69. Hug a Tree, Geronimo (July 2018, originally published in 2015 in Italy as La leggenda della grande quercia) (ISBN 978-93-5275-515-8)
70. The Phantom Bandit (October 2018, originally published in 2016 in Italy as La notte delle zucche mannare) (ISBN 978-93-5275-552-3)
71. Geronimo on Ice! (January 2019, originally published in 2016 in Italy as Il segreto dei pattini d'argento) (ISBN 978-1-338-30621-7)
72. The Hawaiian Heist (May 2019, originally published in 2017 in Italy as Ahi, ahi, ahi, che avventura alle Hawaii!) (ISBN 978-1-338-30624-8)
73. The Missing Movie (October 2019, originally published in 2018 in Italy as Il mistero del film rubato) (ISBN 978-1-338-54696-5)
74. Happy Birthday, Geronimo! (26 December 2019, originally published in 2017 in Italy as Compleanno...con mistero!) (ISBN 978-1-338-58753-1)
75. The Sticky Situation (March 2020, originally published in 2017 in Italy as Te lo do io il miele, Stilton!) (ISBN 978-1-338-58756-2)
76. Superstore Surprise (6 October 2020, originally published in 2019 in Italy as Grande Mistero al Megastore!) (ISBN 978-1-338-65499-8)
77. The Last Resort Oasis (2 March 2021, originally published in 2018 in Italy as Vacanze da sogno all'Oasi Sputacchiosa) (ISBN 978-1-338-68717-0)
78. The Mysterious Eye of the Dragon (20 July 2021, originally published in 2018 in Italy as Il misterioso occhio del drago) (ISBN 978-1-338-68720-0)
79. Garbage Dump Disaster (21 September 2021, originally published in 2019 in Italy as Lo strano caso del ladro di spazzatura) (ISBN 978-1-338-75684-5)
80. Have a Heart, Geronimo (4 January 2022, originally published in 2019 in Italy as Un amore da brivido) (ISBN 978-1-338-80224-5)
81. The Super Cup Faceoff (28 June 2022, originally published in 2016 in Italy as Finale di Supercoppa... a Topazia!) (ISBN 978-1-338-80226-9)
82. Mouse VS Wild (27 December 2022, originally published in 2020 in Italy as Il segreto di Porto Tanfoso) (ISBN 978-1-338-84802-1)
83. Treasures of the Maya (5 March 2024, originally published in 2019 in Italy as Il Tesoro dei Maya) (ISBN 978-1-339-02773-9)
84. Blast From The Past (4 March 2025, originally published in 2020 in Italy as La Giacca Misteriosa) (ISBN 978-1-5461-4185-3)
85. The Legend of Chocolate Hills (6 January 2026, originally published in 2018 in Italy as I giganti delle Colline Cioccolato) (ISBN 979-8-225-02786-5)
86. The Hunt for the Secret Papyrus (2 February 2027, originally published in 2014 in Italy as Il mistero del papiro nero) (ISBN 979-8-225-08298-7)

==== Geronimo Stilton: Special Edition ====
1. A Christmas Tale (October 2005, originally published in 2002 in Italy as Una tenera, tenera, tenera storia sotto la neve) (ISBN 978-0-439-79131-1)
2. Christmas Catastrophe (October 2007, originally published in 2005 in Italy as Ahi, ahi, ahi, sono ne guai!) (ISBN 978-0-545-00902-7)
3. The Hunt for the Golden Book (April 2014, originally published in 2010 in Italy as Caccia al libro d'oro) (ISBN 978-0-545-64649-9)
4. The Hunt for the Curious Cheese (April 2015, originally published in 2014 in Italy as Lo strano caso dei formaggi strapuzzoni) (ISBN 978-0-545-79151-9)
5. The Hunt for the Secret Papyrus (April 2016, originally published in 2014 in Italy as Il mistero del papiro nero) (ISBN 978-0-545-87250-8)
6. The Hunt for the Hundredth Key (April 2017, originally published in 2014 in Italy as Il Castello delle 100 Storie) (ISBN 978-93-86313-21-8)
7. The Hunt for the Colosseum Ghost (March 2018, originally published in 2016 in Italy as Il fantasma del colosseo) (ISBN 978-1-338-21522-9)

==== Geronimo Stilton: Mini Mystery ====
1. The Super Scam (2012, originally published in 2007 in Italy as Una truffa coi baffi) (ISBN 978-93-86106-71-1)
2. The Lake Monster (2012, originally published in 2007 in Italy as Il mostro di lago Lago) (ISBN 978-93-86106-72-8)
3. The Mouse Hoax (2012, originally published in 2007 in Italy as IL topo faLsarIo) (ISBN 978-0-545-56021-4)
4. The Cat Gang (2014, originally published in 2008 in Italy as La Banda del Gatto) (ISBN 978-93-86313-67-6)
5. The Double Cross (2014, originally published in 2008 in Italy as La doppia ladra) (ISBN 978-93-86313-68-3)
6. The Cheese Burglar (2014, originally published in 2008 in Italy as Il ladro di croste) (ISBN 978-0-545-92675-1)

==== Anniversary Edition ====
1. The Little Book of Happiness (2003) (ISBN 978-0-545-48255-4)
2. The Secret World of Geronimo Stilton (2004) (ISBN 978-0-545-48254-7)

=== The Kingdom of Fantasy ===
The series chronicles Geronimo's adventures as a knight in a magical world known as the Kingdom of Fantasy.

1. The Kingdom of Fantasy (2003, 2007 (English Edition)) (ISBN 978-0-545-98025-8)
2. The Quest for Paradise (2005, 2009 (English Edition)) (ISBN 978-0-545-25307-9)
3. The Amazing Voyage (2007, 2011 (English Edition)) (ISBN 978-0-545-30771-0)
4. The Dragon Prophecy (2008, 2012 (English Edition)) (ISBN 978-0-545-39351-5)
5. The Volcano of Fire (2009, 2013 (English Edition)) (ISBN 978-0-545-55625-5)
6. The Search for Treasure (2010, 2014 (English Edition)) (ISBN 978-0-545-65604-7)
7. The Enchanted Charms (2011, 2015 (English Edition)) (ISBN 978-0-545-74615-1)
8. The Hour of Magic (2012, 2016 (English Edition)) (ISBN 978-0-545-82336-4)
9. The Wizard's Wand (2014, 2016 (English Edition)) (ISBN 978-1-338-03291-8)
10. The Ship of Secrets (2016, 2017 (English Edition)) (ISBN 978-1-338-08881-6)
11. The Guardian of the Realm (2017, 2018 (English Edition)) (ISBN 978-1-338-21503-8)
12. The Island of Dragons (2018, 2019 (English Edition) (ISBN 978-1-338-54693-4)
13. The Battle for Crystal Castle (2019, 2020 (English Edition)) (ISBN 978-1-338-65501-8)
14. The Keepers of the Empire (2020, 2021 (English Edition)) (ISBN 978-1-338-75692-0)
15. The Golden Key (2021, 2022 (English Edition)) (ISBN 978-1-338-84800-7)
16. The Treasures of the Kingdom (2022, 2023 (English Edition)) (ISBN 978-1-339-00599-7)
17. The Midnight Heist (2023, 2025 (English Edition)) (ISBN 978-1-5461-4183-9)

==== The Kingdom of Fantasy: Special Edition ====
1. The Phoenix of Destiny (September 2015, originally published in 2013 in Italy as Grande ritorno nel regno della fantasia) (ISBN 978-0-545-82907-6)
2. The Dragon of Fortune (September 2017, originally published in 2015 in Italy as Grande ritorno nel regno della fantasia 2) (ISBN 978-1-338-15939-4)

=== Thea Stilton ===
The series is aimed toward female audiences and focuses on the "Thea Sisters", a group of five friends who are from different continents and were the students of Thea Stilton.

1. Thea Stilton and the Dragon's Code (April 2009, originally published in 2005 in Italy as Il Codice del Drago) (ISBN 978-0-545-10367-1)
2. Thea Stilton and the Mountain of Fire (September 2009, originally published in 2006 in Italy as la Montagna Parlante) (ISBN 978-0-545-15060-6)
3. Thea Stilton and the Ghost of the Shipwreck (March 2010, originally published in 2007 in Italy as Il Vascello Fantasma) (ISBN 978-0-545-15059-0)
4. Thea Stilton and the Secret City (June 2010, originally published in 2006 in Italy as La Città Segreta) (ISBN 978-0-545-15061-3)
5. Thea Stilton and the Mystery in Paris (November 2010, originally published in 2007 in Italy as Mistero a Parigi) (ISBN 978-0-545-22773-5)
6. Thea Stilton and the Cherry Blossom Adventure (March 2011, originally published in 2009 in Italy as Il mistero della bambola nera) (ISBN 978-0-545-22772-8)
7. Thea Stilton and the Star Castaways (June 2011, originally published in 2008 in Italy as NeraI Naufraghi Delle Stelle) (ISBN 978-0-545-22774-2)
8. Thea Stilton: Big Trouble in the Big Apple (September 2011, originally published in 2007 in Italy as Grosso Guaio a New York) (ISBN 978-0-545-22775-9)
9. Thea Stilton and the Ice Treasure (December 2011, originally published in 2008 in Italy as Il tesoro di ghiaccio) (ISBN 978-0-545-33134-0)
10. Thea Stilton and the Secret of the Old Castle (March 2012, originally published in 2009 in Italy as il segreto del castello scozzese) (ISBN 978-0-545-34107-3)
11. Thea Stilton and the Blue Scarab Hunt (June 2012, originally published in 2009 in Italy as Caccia allo scarabeo blu) (ISBN 978-93-5275-628-5)
12. Thea Stilton and the Prince's Emerald (September 2012, originally published in 2010 in Italy as lo smeraldo del principe indiano) (ISBN 978-0-545-34108-0)
13. Thea Stilton and the Mystery on the Orient Express (December 2012, originally published in 2010 in Italy as Mistero sull'Orient Express) (ISBN 978-0-545-34105-9)
14. Thea Stilton and the Dancing Shadows (March 2013, originally published in 2011 in Italy as Mistero dietro le quinte) (ISBN 978-0-545-48187-8)
15. Thea Stilton and the Legend of the Fire Flowers (June 2013, originally published in 2011 in Italy as La leggenda dei fiori di fuoco) (ISBN 978-0-545-48188-5)
16. Thea Stilton and the Spanish Dance Mission (September 2013, originally published in 2012 in Italy as Mission Flamenco) (ISBN 978-0-545-55626-2)
17. Thea Stilton and the Journey to the Lion's Den (December 2013, originally published in 2012 in Italy as Cinque amiche per un leone) (ISBN 978-0-545-55627-9)
18. Thea Stilton and the Great Tulip Heist (March 2014, originally published in 2013 in Italy as Sulle tracce del tulipano nero) (ISBN 978-93-5103-215-1)
19. Thea Stilton and the Chocolate Sabotage (June 2014, originally published in 2013 in Italy as Una cascata di cioccolato!) (ISBN 978-0-545-64656-7)
20. Thea Stilton and the Missing Myth (December 2014, originally published in 2014 in Italy as I segreti dell'Olimpo) (ISBN 978-93-5103-550-3)
21. Thea Stilton and the Lost Letters (June 2015, originally published in 2014 in Italy as Amore alla corte degli zar) (ISBN 978-93-5103-908-2)
22. Thea Stilton and the Tropical Treasure (December 2015, originally published in 2015 in Italy as Avventura ai Caraibi) (ISBN 978-0-545-83552-7)
23. Thea Stilton and the Hollywood Hoax (June 2016, originally published in 2015 in Italy as Colpo di scena a Hollywood) (ISBN 978-93-86041-13-5)
24. Thea Stilton and the Madagascar Madness (December 2016, originally published in 2015 in Italy as Mistero in Madagascar) (ISBN 978-1-338-03289-5)
25. Thea Stilton and the Frozen Fiasco (June 2017, originally published in 2015 in Italy as Inseguimento Tra I Ghiacci) (ISBN 978-93-86313-76-8)
26. Thea Stilton and the Venice Masquerade (December 2017, originally published in 2015 in Italy as Carnevale a Venezia) (ISBN 978-93-5275-122-8)
27. Thea Stilton and the Niagara Splash (May 2018, originally published in 2016 in Italy as Missione Niagara) (ISBN 978-93-5275-259-1)
28. Thea Stilton and the Riddle of the Ruins (December 2018, originally published in 2016 in Italy as Il tesoro scomparso) (ISBN 978-93-5275-554-7)
29. Thea Stilton and the Phantom of the Orchestra (June 2019, originally published in 2016 in Italy as Due cuori a Londra) (ISBN 978-1-338-30615-6)
30. Thea Stilton and the Black Forest Burglary (December 2019, originally published in 2017 in Italy as Il segreto della Foresta Nera) (ISBN 978-93-5275-983-5)
31. Thea Stilton and the Race for the Gold (June 2020, originally published in 2016 in Italy as Sognando le Olimpiadi) (ISBN 978-93-90066-80-3)
32. Thea Stilton and the Rainforest Rescue (1 December 2020, originally published in 2018 in Italy as Destinazione Malesia) (ISBN 978-93-90189-32-8)
33. Thea Stilton and the American Dream (18 May 2021, originally published in 2019 in Italy as Avventura negli U.S.A) (ISBN 978-1-338-68707-1)
34. Thea Stilton and the Roman Holiday (21 September 2021, originally published in 2017 in Italy as Caccia al tesoro a Roma) (ISBN 978-1-338-75687-6)
35. Thea Stilton and the Fiesta in Mexico (7 June 2022, originally published in 2017 in Italy as Viaggio in Messico) (ISBN 978-93-5471-071-1)
36. Thea Stilton and the Cave of Stars (3 October 2023, originally published in 2019 in Italy as La Grotta Delle Stelle) (ISBN 978-1-338-84804-5)
37. Thea Stilton and the Ghost of the Woods (12 November 2024, originally published in 2018 in Italy as La legenda del fantasma Irlandese) (ISBN 978-1-339-02767-8)
38. Thea Stilton and the Search for the Secret Garden (1 July 2025, originally published in 2023 in Italy as Appuntamento a Parigi) (ISBN 978-1-5461-4181-5)
39. Thea Stilton and the Blue Island Thief (2 June 2026, originally published in 2021 in Italy as Il ladro dell'Isola Blu) (ISBN 979-8-225-02785-8)
40. Thea Stilton and the Recipe for Trouble (1 June 2027, originally published in 2020 in Italy as A Barcellona con lo chef) (ISBN 979-8-225-08296-3)

==== Thea Stilton: Special Edition ====
1. The Journey to Atlantis (October 2012, originally published in 2010 in Italy as Il principe di Atlantide) (ISBN 978-0-545-53012-5)
2. The Secret of the Fairies (October 2013, originally published in 2012 in Italy as Il Fate del Lago) (ISBN 978-0-545-55688-0)
3. The Secret of the Snow (October 2014, originally published in 2013 in Italy as Il Fate del Nevi) (ISBN 978-0-545-65902-4)
4. The Cloud Castle (October 2015, originally published in 2014 in Italy as Il Fate del Nuvole) (ISBN 978-0-545-83537-4)
5. The Treasure of the Sea (October 2016, originally published in 2015 in Italy as Il Fate degli Oceni) (ISBN 978-1-338-03561-2)
6. The Land of Flowers (October 2017, originally published in 2016 in Italy as Il Fate dei Fiori) (ISBN 978-1-338-15942-4)
7. The Secret of the Crystal Fairies (October 2018, originally published in 2017 in Italy as Il Fate dei Cristalli) (ISBN 978-1-338-26860-7)
8. The Dance of the Star Fairies (October 2019, originally published in 2018 in Italy as Il Fate delle Stelle) (ISBN 978-1-338-54702-3)
9. The Magic of the Mirror (6 October 2020, originally published in 2019 in Italy as Lo Specchio Segreto delle Fate) (ISBN 978-1-338-65510-0)

==== Thea Stilton Mouseford Academy ====
1. Drama at Mouseford (October 2014/April 2018, originally published in 2009 in Italy as "L'amore va in scena a Topford") (ISBN 978-0-545-64532-4)
2. The Missing Diary (October 2014/April 2018, originally published in 2009 in Italy as "Il diario segreto di Colette") (ISBN 978-0-545-64533-1)
3. Mouselets in Danger (November 2014/April 2018, originally published in 2009 in Italy as "Tea sisters in pericolo!") (ISBN 978-0-545-67011-1)
4. Dance Challenge (November 2014/April 2018, originally published in 2010 in Italy as "Sfida a ritmo di danza") (ISBN 978-0-545-67010-4)
5. The Secret Invention (February 2015/August 2018, originally published in 2009 in Italy as "Il progetto super segreto") (ISBN 978-0-545-78904-2)
6. A Mouseford Musical (February 2015/December 2018, originally published in 2010 in Italy as "Cinque amiche per un musical") (ISBN 978-0-545-80900-9)
7. Mice Take the Stage (December 2015, originally published in 2010 in Italy as "La strada del successo") (ISBN 978-0-545-87095-5)
8. A Fashionable Mystery (December 2015, originally published in 2010 in Italy as "Chi si nasconde a Topford") (ISBN 978-0-545-87096-2)
9. The Mysterious Love Letter (May 2016, originally published in 2010 in Italy as "Una misteriosa lettera d'amore") (ISBN 978-93-86041-07-4)
10. A Dream on Ice (May 2016, originally published in 2011 in Italy as "Un sogno sul ghiaccio per Colette") (ISBN 978-0-545-91797-1)
11. Lights, Camera, Action! (September 2016, originally published in 2011 in Italy as "Ciak si gira a Topford") (ISBN 978-93-86106-22-3)
12. Mice on the Runway (2016, originally published in 2011 in Italy as "Top model per un giorno") (ISBN 978-93-5275-157-0)
13. Sea Turtle Rescue (December 2017, originally published in 2011 in Italy as "Missione mare pulito") (ISBN 978-93-5275-158-7)
14. The Secret Notebook (2018, originally published in 2011 in Italy as "Il club delle poetesse") (ISBN 978-93-5275-159-4)
15. The Friendship Recipe (2018, originally published in 2012 in Italy as "La ricetta dell’amicizia") (ISBN 978-1-338-18274-3)
16. The Royal Ball (2018, originally published in 2012 in Italy as "Gran ballo con il principe") (ISBN 978-93-5275-161-7)
17. The Puppy Problem (2018, originally published in 2015 in Italy as "Un cucciolo in cerca di casa") (ISBN 978-93-5275-239-3)
18. The Secret of the Butterflies (2019, originally published in 2015 in Italy as "Il segreto delle farfalle dorate") (ISBN 978-1-338-23313-1)
19. The Missing Mirror (2019, originally published in 2016 in Italy as "Lo specchio della sirena") (ISBN 978-1-338-28270-2)
20. The Sweetest Dream (2019, originally published in 2015 in Italy as "I dolci del cuore") (ISBN 978-1-338-28271-9)

==== Thea Stilton and the Treasure Seekers ====
1. The Treasure Seekers (2019, originally published in 2016 in Italy as "Alla Ricerca Dei Tesori Perduti") (ISBN 978-1-338-30617-0)
2. The Compass of the Stars (2020, originally published in 2017 in Italy as "Tesori Perduti: La Bussola Di Stelle") (ISBN 978-1-338-58740-1)
3. The Legend of the Maze (2021, originally published in 2018 in Italy as "Tesori Perduti: Il Labirinto Incantato") (ISBN 978-1-338-68722-4)

=== Creepella von Cacklefur ===
This series follows Creepella von Cacklefur, one of the recurring characters of the main series.

1. The Thirteen Ghosts (August 2011, originally published in 2010 in Italy as Tredici fantasmi per Tenebrosa) (ISBN 978-0-545-30742-0)
2. Meet Me in Horrorwood (August 2011, originally published in 2010 in Italy as Mistero a Castelteschio) (ISBN 978-0-545-30743-7)
3. Ghost Pirate Treasure (February 2012, originally published in 2010 in Italy as Il tesoro del pirata fantasma) (ISBN 978-0-545-30744-4)
4. Return of the Vampire (August 2012, originally published in 2011 in Italy as Un vampiro da salvare!) (ISBN 978-0-545-39348-5)
5. Fright Night (August 2013, originally published in 2011 in Italy as Il rap della paura) (ISBN 978-0-545-39349-2)
6. Ride for Your Life! (August 2014, originally published in 2011 in Italy as Brividi sull'ottovolante) (ISBN 978-0-545-64660-4)
7. A Suitcase Full of Ghosts (August 2015, originally published in 2011 in Italy as Una valigia piena di fantasmi) (ISBN 978-0-545-74611-3)
8. The Phantom of the Theater (August 2016, originally published in 2012 in Italy as Il fantasma del Teatro dei Sospiri) (ISBN 978-0-545-75029-5)
9. The Haunted Dinosaur (August 2017, originally published in 2012 in Italy as Il risveglio del Brividosauro) (ISBN 978-1-338-08789-5)

=== Cavemice ===
The series focuses on Geronimo's ancestor, Geronimo Stiltonoot, in the Stone Age where dinosaurs co-exist with mice and prehistoric mammals.

1. The Stone of Fire (January 2013, originally published in 2011 in Italy as Via le zampe dalla pietra di fuoco!) (ISBN 978-0-545-44774-4)
2. Watch Your Tail! (May 2013, originally published in 2011 in Italy as Attenti alla coda, meteoriti in arrivo) (ISBN 978-0-545-44775-1)
3. Help, I'm in Hot Lava! (November 2013, originally published in 2012 in Italy as Sei nella lava fino al collo, Stiltonùt!) (ISBN 978-0-545-64290-3)
4. The Fast and the Frozen (February 2014, originally published in 2011 in Italy as Per mille mammut, mi si gela la coda!) (ISBN 978-93-5103-194-9)
5. The Great Mouse Race (June 2014, originally published in 2012 in Italy as Per mille ossicini, vai col brontosauro!) (ISBN 978-0-545-64654-3)
6. Don't Wake the Dinosaur! (November 2014, originally published in 2012 in Italy as Dinosauro che dorme non piglia topi!) (ISBN 978-0-545-64654-3)
7. I'm a Scaredy-Mouse! (March 2015, originally published in 2012 in Italy as La tremenda carica dei Tremendosauri) (ISBN 978-93-5103-731-6)
8. Surfing for Secrets (July 2015, originally published in 2013 in Italy as Mordosauri in mare... tesoro da salvare!) (ISBN 978-93-5103-907-5)
9. Get the Scoop, Geronimo! (November 2015, originally published in 2013 in Italy as Cadono notizie da urlo, Stiltont!) (ISBN 978-93-5103-023-2)
10. My Autosaurus Will Win! (March 2016, originally published in 2012 in Italy as Mi si è bucato il trottosauro!) (ISBN 978-93-5103-999-0)
11. Sea Monster Surprise (July 2016, originally published in 2013 in Italy as Polposaura affamata... coda stritolata) (ISBN 978-93-86041-92-0)
12. Paws Off the Pearl! (November 2016, originally published in 2013 in Italy as Trottosauro contro ostrica mannara) (ISBN 978-93-86106-67-4)
13. The Smelly Search (March 2017, originally published in 2014 in Italy as Per mille pietruzze... il gonfiosauro fa le puzze!) (ISBN 978-93-86313-19-5)
14. Shoo, Caveflies! (July 2017, originally published in 2014 in Italy as Non svegliate le mosche Ronf Ronf) (ISBN 978-93-86313-79-9)
15. A Mammoth Mystery (November 2017, originally published in 2013 in Italy as Ahi ahi Stilton, è finito il latte di mammut!) (ISBN 978-93-5275-121-1)

=== Spacemice ===
The series is set in a parallel universe based on space opera, featuring Geronimo Stiltonix as the captain of the MouseStar1 spaceship.

1. Alien Escape (2014, originally published in 2013 in Italy as Minaccia dal pianeta Blurgo) (ISBN 978-0-545-64650-5)
2. You're Mine, Captain! (2014, originally published in 2013 in Italy as Un'aliena per il capitano Stiltonix) (ISBN 978-0-545-64652-9)
3. Ice Planet Adventure (February 2015, originally published in 2013 in Italy as L'invasione dei dispettosi Ponf Ponf) (ISBN 978-0-545-74619-9)
4. The Galactic Goal (2015, originally published in 2014 in Italy as Sfida galattica all'ultimo gol) (ISBN 978-93-5103-732-3)
5. Rescue Rebellion (2015, originally published in 2014 in Italy as Il pianeta dei cosmosauri ribelli) (ISBN 978-0-545-22774-2)
6. The Underwater Planet (2016, originally published in 2014 in Italy as Il mistero del pianeta sommerso) (ISBN 978-93-5103-823-8)
7. Beware! Space Junk! (2016, originally published in 2015 in Italy as pericolo spazzatura spaziale) (ISBN 978-93-86041-08-1)
8. Away in a Star Sled (2016, originally published in 2014 in Italy as la magica notte delle stelle danzanti) (ISBN 978-1-338-03286-4)
9. Slurp Monster Showdown (2017, originally published in 2015 in Italy as Stiltonix contro il mostro Slurp) (ISBN 978-93-86313-17-1)
10. Pirate Spacecat Attack (2017, originally published in 2015 in Italy as Sfida stellare all'ultimo baffo) (ISBN 978-93-86313-75-1)
11. We'll Bite Your Tail, Geronimo! (2017, originally published in 2015 in Italy as E poi ti mordicchio la coda, Stiltonix!) (ISBN 978-93-5275-117-4)
12. The Invisible Planet (2018, originally published in 2016 in Italy as Il pianeta invisibile) (ISBN 978-93-5275-264-5)

=== Heromice ===
The series focuses on Geronimo Superstilton and the Heromice, a team of superheroes who live in Muskrat City and watch over the crimes prevailing in the city.

1. Mice to the Rescue! (July 2014, originally published in 2012 in Italy as "Fermi tutti, superscamorze in arrivo!") (ISBN 978-0-545-66812-5)
2. Robot Attack (November 2014, originally published in 2013 in Italy as "La carica dei robottini puzzoni") (ISBN 978-93-5103-373-8)
3. Flood Mission (March 2015, originally published in 2013 in Italy as "Missione speciale... diluvio universale!") (ISBN 978-93-5103-904-4)
4. The Perilous Plants (July 2015, originally published in 2013 in Italy as "Il superattacco delle margherite zannute") (ISBN 978-93-5103-905-1)
5. The Invisible Thief (November 2015, originally published in 2014 in Italy as "Due supertopi contro il ladro invisibile") (ISBN 978-93-5103-766-8)
6. Dinosaur Danger (November 2016, originally published in 2014 in Italy as "Polpette di supertopo per il T-Rex") (ISBN 978-93-5275-153-2)
7. Time Machine Trouble (March 2017, originally published in 2014 in Italy as "SuperGer e la supermacchina del tempo") (ISBN 978-93-5275-154-9)
8. Charge of the Clones (May 2017, originally published in 2015 in Italy as "Superallarme, Supertopo in fuga!") (ISBN 978-93-5275-155-6)
9. Insect Invasion (July 2017, originally published in 2015 in Italy as "S.O.S. Superinsetti all'assalto") (ISBN 978-93-5275-156-3)
10. Sweet Dreams, Sewer Rats! (December 2017, originally published in 2015 in Italy as "La lunga notte dei Supertopi") (ISBN 978-93-5275-260-7)
11. Revenge of the Mini-Mice! (February 2018, originally published in 2016 in Italy as "Mini-Topi contro Maxi-Pantegane") (ISBN 978-93-5275-261-4)

=== Micekings ===
The series is set in the Viking Age and stars Geronimo Stiltonord, who lives in the village of Mouseborg and faces fiery, mouse-eating dragons every day.

1. Attack of the Dragons (April 2016, originally published in 2014 in Italy as Sei ciccia per draghi) (ISBN 978-0-545-87238-6)
2. The Famouse Fjord Race (August 2016, originally published in 2014 in Italy as Scattare scattareee... Geronimord!) (ISBN 978-93-86041-93-7)
3. Pull the Dragon's Tooth! (December 2016, originally published in 2014 in Italy as Toglilo tu, il dente al dragante!) (ISBN 978-93-86106-69-8)
4. Stay Strong, Geronimo! (April 2017, originally published in 2015 in Italy as La rivincita delle topinghe!) (ISBN 978-93-86313-20-1)
5. The Mysterious Message (August 2017, originally published in 2015 in Italy as Nella terra degli uffa uffa) (ISBN 978-93-86313-81-2)
6. The Helmet Holdup (December 2017, originally published in 2015 in Italy as Chi ha rubato l'elmo Topingo?) (ISBN 978-93-86313-81-2)
7. The Dragon Crown (April 2018, originally published in 2016 in Italy as la corona dei draganti) (ISBN 978-1-338-15921-9)
8. The Great Miceking Stone (November 2018, originally published in 2017 in Italy as Il mistero della pietra topinga) (ISBN 978-93-5275-258-4)

=== The Journey Through Time ===
1. The Journey Through Time (2004, February 2014 (English Edition)) (ISBN 978-0-545-55623-1)
2. Back in Time (2006, February 2015 (English Edition)) (ISBN 978-93-5103-660-9)
3. The Race Against Time (2010, February 2016 (English Edition)) (ISBN 978-93-5103-770-5)
4. Lost in Time(2011, February 2017 (English Edition)) (ISBN 978-1-338-08877-9)
5. No Time to Lose (2012, February 2018 (English Edition)) (ISBN 978-1-338-21526-7)
6. The Test of Time (2013, February 2019 (English Edition)) (ISBN 978-93-5275-686-5)
7. Time Warp (2014, February 2020 (English Edition)) (ISBN 978-93-89628-79-1)
8. Out of Time (2016, 5 January 2021 (English Edition)) (ISBN 978-1-338-68712-5)

=== Classic Tales ===
The series are adaptations of public domain literature with anthropomorphic mouse characters.

1. Treasure Island (2006, 1 November 2014 (English Edition) (ISBN 978-93-5103-982-2)
2. Little Women (2007, 1 October 2015 (English Edition)) (ISBN 978-93-5103-998-3)
3. Around the World in Eighty Days (2006, 1 October 2016 (English Edition)) (ISBN 978-93-5103-624-1)
4. The Wonderful Wizard of Oz (2011, 1 July 2017 (English Edition)) (ISBN 978-93-86106-00-1)
5. Alice in Wonderland (2010, 1 December 2017 (English Edition)) (ISBN 978-93-5275-115-0)
6. Moby Dick (2014, 1 June 2018 (English Edition)) (ISBN 978-93-5275-880-7)
7. The Secret Garden (2012, 1 November 2018 (English Edition)) (ISBN 978-93-5275-881-4)
8. Gulliver's Travels (2012, 1 August 2019 (English Edition)) (ISBN 978-93-5275-882-1)
9. A Christmas Carol (2013, 1 November 2019 (English Edition)) (ISBN 978-1-338-54695-8)
10. Journey to the Center of the Earth (2016, 1 November 2019 (English Edition)) (ISBN 978-1-338-31462-5)
11. 20,000 Leagues Under the Sea (2009, February 2020 (English Edition)) (ISBN 978-1-338-54083-3)
12. The Jungle Book (2008, May 2023 (English Edition)) (ISBN 978-981-337-370-9)
13. Mystery of Frankenstein (2013, May 2025 (English Edition)) (ISBN 978-981-351-004-3)

==== Thea Stilton Classic Tales ====
1. Romeo and Juliet (2019, October 2020 (English Edition)) (ISBN 978-93-5471-288-3)
2. Pride and Prejudice (2019, October 2020 (English Edition)) (ISBN 978-93-5471-296-8)
3. A Midsummer Night's Dream (2020, November 2022 (English Edition)) (ISBN 978-981-337-373-0)
4. The Phantom of the Opera (2019, November 2023 (English Edition)) (ISBN 978-981-337-374-7)
5. Goddesses of Olympus (2024, May 2026 (English Edition)) (ISBN 978-981-351-005-0)

=== Graphic novels ===
The English translations of the graphic novels are published by Papercutz.

1. The Discovery of America (18 August 2009, originally published in 2007 in Italy as "Alla scoperta dell'america") (ISBN 978-1-59707-158-1)
2. The Secret of the Sphinx (18 August 2009, originally published in 2007 in Italy as "Il Segreto Della Sfinge") (ISBN 978-1-59707-159-8)
3. The Coliseum Con (24 November 2009, originally published in 2007 in Italy as "La Truffa Del Colosseo ") (ISBN 978-1-59707-172-7)
4. Following the Trail of Marco Polo (13 April 2010, originally published in 2007 in Italy as "Sulle Tracce di Marco Polo") (ISBN 978-1-59707-575-6)
5. The Great Ice Age (6 July 2010, originally published in 2008 in Italy as "La Grande Era Glaciale") (ISBN 978-1-59707-202-1)
6. Who Stole the Mona Lisa? (26 October 2010, originally published in 2009 in Italy as "Chi Ha Rubato Ia Gioconda") (ISBN 978-1-59707-581-7)
7. Dinosaurs in Action (1 February 2011, originally published in 2009 in Italy as "Dinosauri in Azione") (ISBN 978-1-59707-239-7)
8. Play It Again, Mozart! (11 October 2011, originally published in 2011 in Italy as "Suonala Ancora, Mozart!") (ISBN 978-1-59707-587-9)
9. The Weird Book Machine (24 January 2012, originally published in 2011 in Italy as "La Strana Macchina dei Libri") (ISBN 978-1-59707-295-3)
10. Geronimo Stilton Saves the Olympics (17 July 2012, originally published in 2012 in Italy as "Hai Salvato Le Olimpiadi, Stilton") (ISBN 978-1-59707-319-6)
11. We'll Always Have Paris (23 October 2012, originally published in 2012 in Italy as "Il Mistero Della Torre Eiffel") (ISBN 978-1-59707-347-9)
12. The First Samurai (19 March 2013, originally published in 2011 in Italy as "Il Primo Samurai") (ISBN 978-1-59707-385-1)
13. The Fastest Train in the West (October 2013, originally published in 2012 in Italy as "Il Treno Piu Veloce Del Far West") (ISBN 978-1-59707-448-3)
14. The First Mouse on the Moon (24 June 2014, originally published in 2013 in Italy as "Il Primo Topo Sulla Luna") (ISBN 978-1-59707-731-6)
15. All for Stilton, Stilton for All! (13 January 2015, originally published in 2014 in Italy as "Uno per Tutti, Tutti per Stilton") (ISBN 978-1-62991-149-6)
16. Lights, Camera, Stilton! (4 August 2015, originally published in 2014 in Italy as "Ciak, Si Gira, Geronimo Stilton") (ISBN 978-1-62991-366-7)
17. The Mystery of the Pirate Ship (24 May 2016) (ISBN 978-1-62991-451-0)
18. First to the Last Place on Earth! (22 November 2016) (ISBN 978-1-62991-603-3)
19. Lost in Translation (29 August 2017) (ISBN 978-1-62991-758-0)
20. Saving Liberty (October 2018) (cancelled book)

==== Thea Stilton graphic novels ====
1. The Secret of Whale Island (30 April 2013, originally published in 2008 in Italy as "Il Segreto Dell'isola Delle Balene") (ISBN 978-1-59707-403-2)
2. Revenge of the Lizard Club (20 August 2013, originally published in 2008 in Italy as "La Rivicinta del Club Delle Lucertole") (ISBN 978-1-59707-430-8)
3. The Treasure of the Viking Ship (22 April 2014, originally published in 2009 in Italy as "Il tesoro Della Nave Vichinga") (ISBN 978-1-59707-819-1)
4. Catching the Giant Wave (30 September 2014, originally published in 2009 in Italy as "Aspettando L'Onda Gigante ") (ISBN 978-1-62991-050-5)
5. The Secret of the Waterfall In The Woods (9 February 2016) (ISBN 978-1-62991-288-2)
6. The Thea Sisters and the Mystery At Sea (30 August 2016) (ISBN 978-1-62991-478-7)
7. A Song for the Thea Sisters (14 March 2017) (ISBN 978-1-62991-913-3)
8. The Thea Sisters and the Secret Treasure Hunt (26 December 2017) (ISBN 978-1-62991-836-5)

==== Geronimo Stilton Reporter ====
Taking the place of the original graphic novels, the Geronimo Stilton Reporter series are adaptations of episodes from the Geronimo Stilton animated series, which ended the year before the first entry was published.

1. Operation Shufongfong (16 October 2018) (ISBN 978-1-62991-871-6)
2. It's My Scoop! (4 June 2019) (ISBN 978-1-5458-0537-4)
3. Stop Acting Around! (8 October 2019) (ISBN 978-1-5458-0332-5)
4. The Mummy with No Name (28 January 2020) (ISBN 978-1-5458-0402-5)
5. Barry the Moustache (9 June 2020) (ISBN 978-1-5458-0477-3)
6. Paws Off, Cheddarface! (27 October 2020) (ISBN 978-1-5458-0546-6)
7. Going Down to Chinatown (2 March 2021) (ISBN 978-1-5458-0617-3)
8. Hypno Tick-Tock (6 July 2021) (ISBN 978-1-5458-0699-9)
9. Mask of the Rat-Jitsu (16 November 2021) (ISBN 978-1-5458-0729-3)
10. Blackrat’s Treasure (22 March 2022) (ISBN 978-1-5458-0866-5)
11. Mystery on the Rodent Express (26 July 2022) (ISBN 978-1-5458-0885-6)
12. Mouse House of the Future (15 November 2022) (ISBN 978-1-5458-0970-9)
13. Reported Missing (14 February 2023) (ISBN 978-1-5458-1025-5)
14. The Gem Gang (26 September 2023) (ISBN 978-1-5458-1046-0)
15. Clean Sweep (26 December 2023) (ISBN 978-1-5458-1135-1)
16. Mr. and Mrs. Matched (2 April 2024) (ISBN 978-1-5458-1145-0)
17. Top Model Thea (19 November 2024) (ISBN 978-1-5458-1214-3)
18. Attack of the Killer Whale (In Italian "Mamma, che orca!") (1 April 2025) (ISBN 978-1-5458-1621-9)
19. Cheese Connection (In Italian "Che ne è stato del formaggio") (19 August 2025) (ISBN 978-1-5458-1834-3)
20. Starring Geronimo (9 December 2025) (ISBN 978-1-5458-2094-0)
21. Rules of the Game (7 April 2026) (ISBN 978-1-5458-2370-5)
22. The Gator Samaritan (4 August 2026) (ISBN 978-1-5458-2743-7)
23. The Bad Luck of Team Fromage (15 December 2026) (ISBN 978-1-5458-3463-3)

==== Geronimo Stilton the Graphic Novel ====
The graphic novels are illustrated by Tom Angleberger.

1. The Sewer Rat Stink (May 2020, based on the 2003 Geronimo Stilton book Lo strano caso della Pantegana Puzzona) (978-1338587302)
2. Slime for Dinner (2 February 2021, based on the 2018 Geronimo Stilton book Cena con mistero) (ISBN 978-1-338-58735-7)
3. Great Rat Rally (4 January 2022, based on the 2019 Geronimo Stilton book Metti il turbo, Stilton!) (ISBN 978-1-338-72938-2)
4. Last Ride at Luna Park (17 May 2022, based on the 2020 Geronimo Stilton book Brividi Felini Al Luna Park) (ISBN 978-1-338-72939-9)

=== Adventure Camp ===
This series has not been published in English.

1. Una notte sotto le stelle 6 July 2021 (ISBN 978-88-566-7887-1)
2. Coraggio in alta quota 31 August 2021 (ISBN 978-88-566-7888-8)
3. Sfida lungo il fiume 8 February 2022 (ISBN 978-88-566-8165-9)
4. Missione Tartarughe Marine 10 May 2022 (ISBN 978-88-566-8166-6)
5. Esploratori in mountain bike 30 August 2022 (ISBN 978-88-566-8167-3)
6. Il manuale dell'avventura 8 November 2022 (ISBN 978-88-566-8168-0)

== Reception ==
Publishers Weekly's review of Lost Treasure of the Emerald Eye praised the book for its fast pace, chapter format, full-color design, and usage of colored typefaces. Kirkus Reviews' review of the Special Edition book The Hunt for the Hundredth Key states that "the simplistic mysteries and silly jokes are in line with other series outings, 'special edition' status notwithstanding." Its review of Geronimo on Ice! found it to be average, criticizing the plot holes, and remarks that it "skates by without landing any impressive tricks."

Kirkus Reviews' reviews of Cavemice entry The Stone of Fire and Spacemice entry Alien Escape were positive, albeit criticized the slow pacing at the beginning of the former. Its review of Creepella Von Cacklefur entry Fright Night felt the plot wasn't "the strongest of Stilton spinoffs". Its review of The Kingdom of Fantasy entry The Enchanted Charms was mixed, criticizing the plot for not being original and appealing enough, but praising the art and incorporation of puzzles.

== Other media ==
Two English-language eBooks, Geronimo Stilton's Illustrated Tails and Geronimo Stilton's Humorous Tails with the Secret Portrait Gallery, were published by Edizioni Piemme and sold by CyberRead and Barnes & Noble in 2000. The eBooks were part of a collaboration with Microsoft. The books Il mio primo manuale di internet (My First Internet Manual), Trentino: Una Provincia Speciale! (Trentino: A Special Province!), and Il piccolo libro della pace (The Little Book of Peace) were also adapted into eBooks. Piemme released the eBooks at the Frankfurt eBook Awards.

There are also audiobooks of the Geronimo Stilton books published by Scholastic Audio Books, available on CD and as downloadables through various services such as OverDrive and Audible. There are three stories in the first three collections (1–3, 4–6, 7–9), book 10 is sold by itself, and the remaining books are sold in pairs (11–12, 13–14, 15–16, 17–18, 20–21, 22 and 24, 25–26). Books 1 through 10 are read by Edward Herrmann. Books 11–18, 20–22 and 24, and 25–26 are read by Bill Lobley.

=== Television series ===
In 1999, a pilot episode for an animated series of the same name, with two seasons each consisting of 26 episodes, was created by Stranemani, Graphilm, MatitAnimatA and Gertie Productions. It was directed and storyboarded by Marco A. Zanoni, written by Carlotta Mastrangelo, and animated by Federico Panella and Stefania Gallo. In 2000–2001, the series was reported to be in development at Carrère Group, in co-production with Gertie, Les Films de la Perrine, Red Whale and RAI. The series was set for broadcast on Rai 2 in 2004. Many animators and artists participated in the series' production, including Annetta Zucchi and Bruno Olivieri. The voice of Geronimo in this series was provided by Francesco Lovati. A theme song for the series was recorded by I Piccoli Cantori di Milano ("The Little Singers of Milano").

Another animated series debuted in Italy on 15 September 2009. The show ran for 78 episodes across three seasons (26 episodes for each season) with the series finale airing on 28 February 2017.

=== Theatre ===
The Kingdom of Fantasy series has been developed into a musical theatre show, which has been performed in Spanish in Barcelona, Spain, in Dutch in Hong Kong and the Netherlands, in Dutch and Flemish in Belgium, and in both English and French in Montreal, Canada.

In 2016, Oregon Children's Theatre produced Geronimo Stilton: Mouse in Space, a world-premiere adaptation of Mouse in Space! by John Maclay, and the first live-action production of Geronimo Stilton media in the United States. The production was performed in Canada in 2018.

=== Video games ===
Sony Computer Entertainment partnered with Virtual Toys to develop two video games based on The Kingdom of Fantasy series for PlayStation Portable. The first, Geronimo Stilton in the Kingdom of Fantasy, was released in Europe on 3 November 2011. The follow-up, Geronimo Stilton: Return to the Kingdom of Fantasy, was released in the continent on 31 October 2012. In North America, both titles were released exclusively on the PlayStation Store on 16 July 2013.

=== Quiz show ===
A quiz show named Topo Quiz con Geronimo Stilton (Mouse Quiz with Geronimo Stilton) was broadcast on Sky Italia and RaiSat in 2005–2008. The show, hosted by Geronimo (portrayed by Gianni Coluzzi) and a presenter named Gaia, covered environmental topics, nutrition, road safety, and general life studies. Each episode would involve a team of two competing with each other. The show was directed by D. Di Santo. A talk show, Giga blu, was also broadcast on RaiSat around this time.

=== Film ===
A film based on Geronimo Stilton has been in development since 2002.

In February 2023, Radar Pictures acquired the rights to make a feature film based on Geronimo Stilton. The film is a co-production between Radar and Italian company Atlantyca Entertainment, which also produced the television series, with DreamWorks Animation veteran David Soren attached to write and direct and Anthony Tringali, Michael Napoliello and Maria Frisk set to produce under Radar Pictures.
