= Elisabetta Dami =

Italian children's books author (born 1958)

Elisabetta Maria Dami
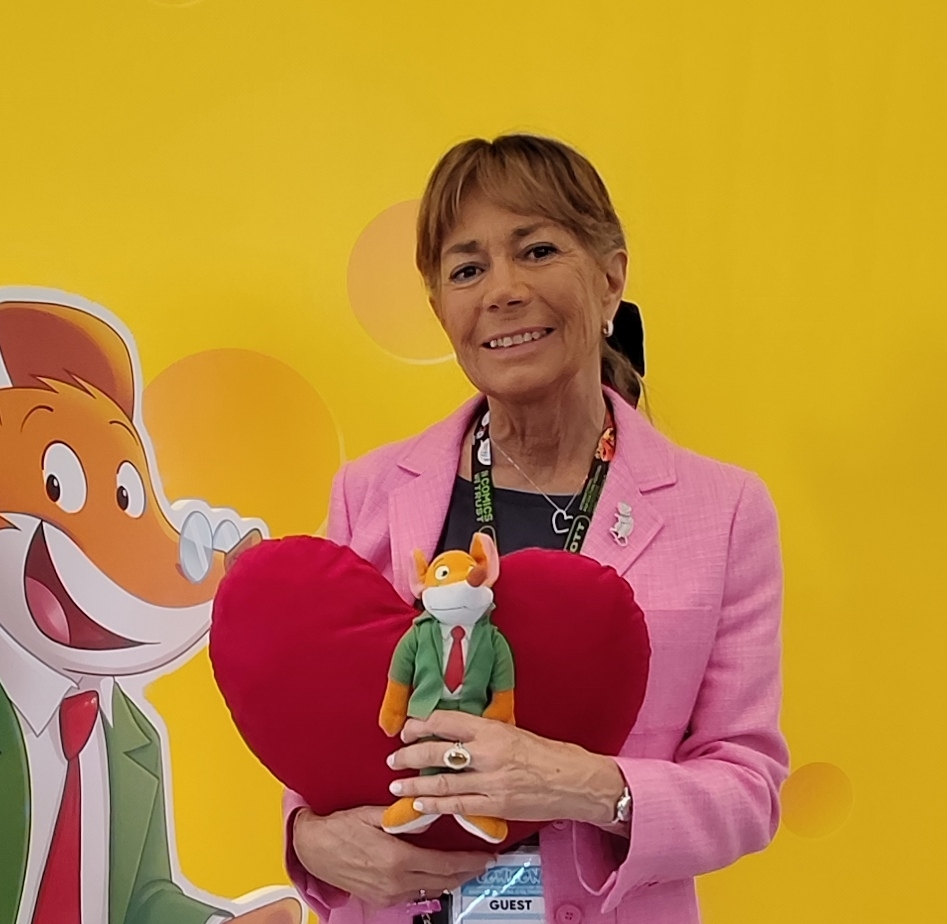
- Elisabetta Dami at COMICON Napoli 2026
- Born: Elisabetta Maria Dami; 1 January 1958 (age 68); Milan, Italy
- Occupation: Author
- Writing career
- Pen name: Geronimo Stilton
- Period: 1997–present
- Genre: Children's literature
- Notable work: Geronimo Stilton
- Website: elisabettadami.com

Elisabetta Maria Dami (born 1 January 1958) is an Italian children's author. She is known for her book series Geronimo Stilton.

== Biography ==
Dami is the daughter of publisher Piero Dami (who founded Dami Editore in 1972). At the age of 13 she started out in the publishing world as a proofreader for the family business, and at nineteen, she wrote her first short stories. As an adventure lover, she got her aircraft pilot and parachutist licenses aged 20. At 23 she traveled around the world on her own and completed a famous survival course at the Outward Bound school in Maine. Some of Dami's other adventures include taking part in a rally in the Sahara desert and crossing Africa from north to south in an off-road vehicle; she raced the 100-km Sahara ultramarathon and ran three New York marathons (in 2002, 2003, and 2017). Dami has spoken at numerous conferences and debates in Italy and abroad, promoting culture and values. Frequently travelling internationally, Dami supports Italian cultural initiatives under the direction of the Ministry of Foreign Affairs and International Cooperation. In addition, Dami has served two terms as a National WWF councillor and is actively involved in various environmental conservation projects. In 2022, Dami was awarded the title of Commendatore della Repubblica Italiana by the President of the Italian Republic, Sergio Mattarella, for her dedication to educating children.

=== The creation of Geronimo Stilton ===
In 1990, Dami discovered that she was unable to have children. Shortly afterwards she began volunteering at a children's hospital.

As she cared for the sick children, Dami decided to write adventure stories that featured a mouse called Geronimo Stilton as the protagonist. These stories became a publishing sensation both in Italy and internationally.

For a while I worked as a volunteer in a hospital, and it was there, almost by chance, that I invented Geronimo Stilton … It was at the time when Patch Adams taught the world that children need to laugh to get better. So I started to make up funny stories in which the protagonist was a clumsy mouse called Geronimo Stilton. He would get involved in all sorts of entertaining adventures, full of funny events and twists in the plot, that children found really compelling.

Geronimo Stilton has been translated into 49 languages and more than 180 million copies have been sold worldwide.
