= List of Needless episodes =

Needless is an anime series adapted from Kami Imai manga series of the same name. Produced by Madhouse and directed by Masayuki Sakoi, the series was broadcast on Tokyo MX from July 2, 2009, to December 10, 2009, for 24 episodes. The opening theme is "Modern Strange Cowboy" by GRANRODEO and the ending is "Aggressive Zone" by Needless★Girls, composed of the voice actresses of the series, Aya Endo, Eri Kitamura, Emiri Katō, Saori Gotō and Yui Makino. The second opening is "Scarlet Bomb!" by Aki Misato and the second ending is "WANTED! for the love" by Needless★Girls.

North American anime distributor Section23 Films announced that Sentai Filmworks has licensed the series and would release the series. The first complete set was shipped on Blu-ray and DVD February 11, 2011. The second complete set was released on April 12, 2011.

== Episode list ==
No.	Title	Original release date
1	"Adam Blade"; Transliteration: "Adamu ・ Bureido" (Japanese: アダム・ブレイド)	July 2, 2009
Cruz Schild, a survivor of the uprising against the Simeon Tower, is saved by a priest named Adam Blade, who destroys a spider-like patrolling machine known as a Testament in pursuit, nearly taking his life. Gido treats Blade in a church, and Eve Neuschwanstein later meets with the rest there. Eve scolds Cruz for what the Resistance has started against the Simeon Tower, causing him to run away to an abandoned shelter. An assassin sent from the Simeon Tower named Kafka attempts to kill Cruz, but Blade and Eve come to the rescue. Kafka tries to entangle Blade with his threads, but the latter easily breaks free. Eve duplicates Cruz's appearance and switches places with him as a distraction. Blade then learns how to control his own threads to defeat Kafka.
2	"Eve Neuschwanstein"; Transliteration: "Ivu ・ Noishuvanshutain" (Japanese: イヴ・ノイシュヴァンシュタイン)	July 9, 2009
While Cruz helps buy Eve a specific beverage near a warehouse, the two encounter Uten, one of the four elite from the Simeon Tower. Uten, expressing his tricks as a magician using barriers, attacks Eve with a barrage of knives, putting her at a disadvantage. Then, he creates a bed of nails on the ground, trapping them on a floating platform. After Eve shields herself using the soft drink, Cruz figures out from the splashes that the floor is actually invisible. As Uten's power of transparency is exposed, Eve transforms her arm into a drill to break through the concrete wall that Uten was hiding behind, cancelling out his power and uncovering the surrounding area.
3	"Momiji Teruyama"; Transliteration: "Teruyama Momiji" (Japanese: 照山最次)	July 16, 2009
A mysterious man with flame powers named Momiji Teruyama goes inside the church, on a mission to kill a man named "Adam". Blade reveals his name as such and challenges Teruyama to a duel, while Eve takes Cruz to a safe place to hide. Soon enough, Blade learns how to control flames and punches Teruyama. The two go outside, where Teruyama launches a giant fireball at Blade. After dodging the attack, Blade learns how to launch his own fireball and combines it with threads for a surprise attack. Gido realizes that Teruyama was not sent from the Simeon Tower to find Blade. Instead, Teruyama says he was searching for Adam Arclight, the head of the Simeon Tower, having to apologize for the confusion.
4	"Iron Mountain"; Transliteration: "Aianmaunten" (Japanese: アイアンマウンテン)	July 23, 2009
With his body becoming fragile, Arclight send three girls from the Simeon Girl Squadron to have Blade captured to have his body replaced. Teruyama leads Blade, Eve, Cruz and Gido underground to talk to an informant via secret computer, who tells the group to meet at Iron Mountain for information about Arclight. During a long journey, the group sees some thugs harassing a young girl. Blade, with his flaw of an attraction to young girls, immediately takes down the thugs. The girl, recognized as Mio, follows the group to Iron Mountain, where they enter a laboratory filled with rebuilt Testaments. After making past all the death traps, they finally meet the informant named Disc, a cyborg who appears to be a young girl, who states that Blade is one of the clones of the "Adam Project".
5	"Simeon Girl Squadron"; Transliteration: "Shimeon shōjo butai" (Japanese: シメオン少女部隊)	July 30, 2009
Two girls of the Simeon Girl Squadron, Setsuna and Kuchinashi, infiltrate the laboratory and destroy the rebuilt Testaments sent out by Disc. Eve fights Setsuna, one who can attack at great speeds, while Blade battles Kuchinashi, one who sprays a fragrance that allows her to paralyze and control his body. Afterwards, Disc activates the defense walls to prevent Eve and Blade from further damage. Mio then asks Cruz to take get to the restroom, handing him her stuffed teddy bear, which turns out to be very heavy, and knocks him unconscious. She is revealed as the third member of the Simeon Girl Squadron, having the ability of power, which gives her superhuman strength. Mio carries Cruz and exits with Setsuna and Kuchinashi out of the laboratory after Eve duplicated Setsuna's appearance to sound the alarm. However, Eve switched bodies with Cruz during that time, and she tries to take them all on. In the end, she ends up being their hostage.
6	"Goldy Locks"; Transliteration: "Gorudirokkusu" (Japanese: ゴルディロックス)	August 6, 2009
Disc decides to join the group to search for Eve and face the Simeon Girl Squadron. Meanwhile, Eve has escaped from the Simeon Girl Squadron when they took a brief stop. The squadron finds a mansion armed with a security system. Eve is there as well, looking for something to replenish her energy. The squadron falls through many traps while trying to find Eve in the kitchen. After entering the bank vault, with Eve setting off the alarm, the four girls are sent down a tunnel to the cannon, blasting them out into the sky. At the church, Disc and the others see a live broadcast of Arclight on screen in the sky, mandating the citizens to attend an inaugural event in the Simeon Tower at noon the following day. After the squadron returns to the tower, Eve is then held captive inside.
7	"Adam Arclight"; Transliteration: "Adamu ・ Aakuraito" (Japanese: アダム・アークライト)	August 13, 2009
Riru Roukakuji, leader of the Simeon Girl Squadron, sends Setsuna, Kuchinashi and Mio on a mission to retrieve a golden safe from a bank against their rivals, Nanami and Misaki, to see who will truly represent the squadron for the inaugural event. Nanami and Misaki arrive there and use their respective powers of water and earth to tear up the bank and restrain the bank owner. Setsuna, Kuchinashi and Mio, first misled by the location, later arrive and cause further destruction, then manage to obtain the safe. During the inaugural event, some members of the Resistance try to charge at Arclight, but they are easily overpowered and consumed by him. However, Blade comes after Arclight, after the latter tried to apprehend two children.
8	"Riru Roukakuji"; Transliteration: "Roukakuji Riru" (Japanese: 楼閣寺離瑠)	August 20, 2009
Everyone gathered around the Simeon Tower watch as Blade and Arclight go head-to-head in battle. After Arclight counters Blade's threads and fireball, Disc deduces that Arclight has the same ability as Blade, but the former's power is much stronger than the latter's. The citizens try to evade the area, but Riru barricades them with dog-like Testaments surrounding the area. Riru, revealed as another one the four elite from the Simeon Tower, uses her ability of psychokinesis to raise a whole monument over the citizens as a threat for them to stay put. Blade goes into the tower alone upon Arclight's request. He enters a room called Shelter No. 3, a battlefield resembling that of a large-scale bedroom, where he will be fighting the Simeon Girl Squadron in order to save Eve from captivity. Disc uses her ability to scan in an attempt to reprogram one of the Testaments, while Teruyama does his very best to keep it from crushing her.
9	"Shelter No. 3"; Transliteration: "Dai 3 sherutā" (Japanese: 第3シェルター)	August 27, 2009
After Disc successfully reprograms the Testament, it is recalled into the tower for assumed repair. Cruz, Gido, Teruyama and Disc hide inside of it to gain entry. After evading the engineers and the guards, they crawl through the air vents, where Disc hacks into the security camera system to locate Blade. Meanwhile, Blade seems to struggle as he fights the Simeon Girl Squadron, having no chance for an attack. Cruz and company travel to an underground plant, but they are cornered by guards and Testaments. However, they are saved by Set and Solva, who easily defeat the squadron when they arrive.
10	"Set & Solva"; Transliteration: "Seto × Soruvua" (Japanese: セト×ソルヴァ)	September 3, 2009
Long ago, Blade and Set were former partners in a guild and met Solva while taking a trip on a bus. Blade and Set protected the passengers from two bandits who tried to rob the bus. Later, Solva asks them to retrieve the money stolen from the bandits, but from drinking poisoned tea, they are soon captured by the two bandits and their boss, Kanna, who can control both fire and ice. The guild members come to rescue Blade and Set, but Kanna stops them in their tracks. Set uses her ability to control gravity to subdue the bandits, and she destroys Kanna's throne after figuring out it was the source of producing fire and ice. However, it was Kanna that hired Blade and Set to kill Solva, not the other way around. Solva uses her power of magnetism in response, but Blade and Set defeat her using their abilities. As a reward, Kanna show the two her late father's sunflower garden. Solva asks to join the two on their journey, to which they accept.
11	"Black Attraction"; Transliteration: "Burakku ・ Atorakushon" (Japanese: ブラック・アトラクション)	September 10, 2009
The Simeon Girl Squadron still wants to pick a fight with the group. Blade, Teruyama, Set and Solva take on the squadron altogether, merging their abilities into one combined attack. Setsuna, Kuchinashi and Mio call a surrender and release Eve. When Blade goes to see Eve, she attacks him out of nowhere, drilling a hole in his chest. This is because Kurumi, a fourth member of the squadron, used her ability to control the mind, manipulating Eve's thoughts and actions. While Disc performs emergency medical procedures on Blade, Gido believes that if the group can get Eve back to normal, then it would allow her to switch places with Blade and heal his body. When Solva tries to come after Kurumi, the former finds out that the latter is a holographic image of herself. Even when Cruz figures out that Eve will exhaust after a short while, Setsuna reveals that a concentrated beverage is installed into Eve in order to maintain her energy.
12	"Kurumi"; Transliteration: "Kurumi" (Japanese: 胡桃)	September 17, 2009
Although Cruz detects a security camera is hidden in the room, he theorizes that Kurumi is hiding somewhere in the room. Teruyama, Set and Solva merge their abilities to control the power, speed and direction of a giant baseball. They send the baseball into the bookshelf where Kurumi was hiding, stabbing her on impact. Cruz explains his reasoning of how he knew where Kurumi was hiding, pointing out that she would only be behind a large book placed on the second shelf based on the layout of the room. After Kurumi falls to her death, Eve seems to return to normal. However, this is not true since she is still brainwashed, aside from the fact that Kurumi died. After Teruyama, Set and Solva incur severe injuries from Eve's surprise attack, Disc tells Cruz and Gido that there could still be a way to return Eve back to normal.
13	"Byakugou"; Transliteration: "Byakugō" (Japanese: 白毫)	September 24, 2009
In order to save Eve, Blade would need to learn the ability to control the mind. The Byakugou, a jewel placed on his forehead, would be able to drain out the power of his enemy if it is placed on their forehead. As Disc continues to recover Blade, Gido acts as decoy against the Simeon Girl Squadron, while Cruz sneaks past them to get to Kurumi's body. Saten, another of the four elite from the Simeon Tower, suddenly appears and instills fear on everyone. He sends Cruz with Kurumi's body next to Disc near Blade's body, and Blade reawakens after learning the ability to control the mind, before the squadron tries to finish him off. Using the ability, Blade commands Eve to destroy the viruses inside of her, returning her back to normal. Eve heals Blade's wounds completely while fending the squadron off at the same time. Blade then takes on the squadron alone while Eve goes off to heal the rest of the group.
14	"Lilith Temptation"; Transliteration: "Ririsu ・ Tenputēshon" (Japanese: リリス・テンプテーション)	October 1, 2009
Kuchinashi, having spoken for the first time, uses her ultimate attack, a fragrance which makes people see their greatest desire in an alternative dimension. Teruyama easily defeats Blade and Arclight; Eve guesses everyone's name right in a game show; Set finds a pile of gold underground, thanks to Disc; Solva sees Arclight and Saten captured, and she becomes ruler; Gido reunites with Kazumi Ogiha, one of his former laboratory partners; and Cruz is surprised to see that his sister, Aruka Schild, is still alive. Disc, not affected by the strong scent, watches as the Simeon Girl Squadron effortlessly beats up the ones affected. However, Cruz, realizing he is in a trance, runs away from his sister, which snaps him out of it. Blade reveals that he is not affected by the strong scent since he is already surrounded by cute girls. He takes out Kuchinashi and Mio first, allowing the affected ones to come back to their senses. Learning the ability of speed, he attacks Setsuna head on. But before Blade has the opportunity to finish her off, Saten intervenes.
15	"Fourth Wave"; Transliteration: "Dai shi hadō" (Japanese: 第四波動)	October 8, 2009
Saten freezes Kurumi's body and tells the Simeon Girl Squadron to take her away, before beginning his fight with Blade and covering the floor with ice. He uses his ability to absorb thermal energy and redirect it in various ways, such as fire, ice and wind. Blade uses the Byakugou to learn this ability, but it fails to work. A mask woman, said to be the last of the four elite from the Simeon Tower, appears, as she takes on Teruyama, Set and Solva all at once. As Blade and Eve face off against Saten, Cruz speculates how Saten's ability works.
16	"Aruka Schild"; Transliteration: "Aruka ・ Shirudo" (Japanese: アルカ・シルド)	October 15, 2009
Cruz concludes that Saten uses his ability in the order of absorption and redirection. The masked woman uses her ability to speed up kinetic energy, breaking Set's sword right before her eyes. Teruyama and Solva attack the mask woman, cracking her mask and revealing her to actually be Aruka, Cruz's long-lost sister. She is actually a spy from the Simeon Tower, sent to leak top-secret information about the Resistance. There is a data chip inside Cruz's pendant containing that information, as she was ordered to retrieve the data chip to Arclight. In order to protect Cruz from harm, Set and Solva attack Aruka, but they are no match against her since she has already figured out their abilities. Even Teruyama's immunity to heat has no effect against Aruka's ability. Aruka then severely injures Cruz, but as she attempts to kill him, Blade stands in her way.
17	"Resistance"; Transliteration: "Rejisutansu" (Japanese: レジスタンス)	October 22, 2009
As Cruz starts to die, he has an out-of-body experience back into the past to when the Resistance was planning to launch an attack against Arclight. Zakard, the leader of the Resistance, gives Cruz the pendant to treat it with the utmost importance. When the Resistance tries to ambush Arclight on his way to the Simeon Tower, the four elite ones kill off much of the Resistance. Aruka is soon unveiled to be an informant for Arclight, much to Zakard's surprise. Zakard uses his ability to make an armor of regenerative rock formed around him, as he begins to battle Arclight. However, Arclight easily defeats Zakard with a series of learned abilities, and Arclight then crushes Zakard after the latter says that the data chip is not longer in his possession. Meanwhile, Cruz and Aruka were being chased by a Testament. When Cruz was hiding in the sewer, Aruka actually destroyed the Testament and made it out alive. Cruz, returning from his out-of-body experience, takes his final breath, leaving everyone in the room in shock.
18	"Agni Schiwatas"; Transliteration: "Agunisshuwattasu" (Japanese: アグニッシュワッタス)	October 29, 2009
Cruz is somehow still barely alive but in a comatose state; Blade and Eve are separately still busy fighting Aruka and Saten, respectively; and Teruyama, Set and Solva are still in critical condition. Aruka explains that by unlocking all parts of the brain, one would utilize their ability to the fullest. Saten gives Eve the opportunity to give her time to heal Cruz by faking his defeat. Aruka uses her ability to speed up kinetic energy in order to trap Blade in flames. Disc delivers an electrical charge through Eve to jump-start Cruz's heart. Blade uses his ability to absorb the fire, confirming how Saten and Aruka's abilities are alike. Blade then sends a giant, electrical fireball toward Aruka, so powerful that not even she can withstand it.
19	"Positive Feedback Zero"; Transliteration: "Pojitibufīdobakku ・ Zero" (Japanese: ポジティブフィードバック・ゼロ)	November 5, 2009
Aruka still gets up from her defeat and immediately charges toward Cruz, but she suddenly withholds her punch. Arclight finally shows his face, ensuring that the citizens are in good hands, seeing a live performance hosted by an all-female rock band. He takes them to the top floor of the left wing of the tower, where he reveals that his heart and right eye are artificial, and he wants Blade's body to become all powerful. Blade is unable to land a blow when he engages in battle against Arclight. Moreover, Arclight not only has the ability to learn other abilities, but his ability is also much stronger in comparison. Arclight punches right through Blade seemingly as a finishing move, but the latter takes this opportunity to use his Byakugou to learn Arclight's ability, causing Arclight's past memories to be projected through several images.
20	"A - B"	November 12, 2009
In the past, Gido was among the scientists working on the "Adam Project". After seventy-seven failures, Gido was told that the project may be discontinued if the current test subject yields no results. Ishiyama, head of the Triple Six Committee, orders for this project to be terminated as a result. However, Gido and his team are given a chance to continue the project, in charge of two test subjects later recognized as Blade and Arclight. Upon completion of the project, Arclight was deemed a failure, while Blade turned out a success. Arclight is disposed into a landfill near the laboratory. Gido is asked by Kazumi, one of his lab partners, to go on a vacation together. Later on, Kyouji Kannazuki, another one of his lab partners, is worried about Gido, after Kazumi had been lost in a laboratory accident. Gido introduces Blade to Eve as his mating partner.
21	"A - A"	November 19, 2009
Blade frustrates over the fact that Eve has problems in memory development, but he still manages to get along with her. One day, Eve takes Blade with her to the roof of the laboratory, skipping his scheduled training, which has Gido and Kannazuki worried of where they might have gone. At night, the two see the starry sky for the first time. When Gido and Kannazuki find Blade and Eve, they prohibit Eve to see Blade until he completes his training. The laboratory is breached by an unknown intruder, who takes out the engineers and guards. When the intruder, revealed as a derailed Arclight, approaches Eve, Blade blocks him and fights back. Arclight then enters into a restricted area in the underground plant which contains remnants of the "Second", fusing with it to absorb its incredible power. The laboratory is consequentially destroyed, but thanks to Blade and Eve, Gido manages to survive the explosion along with them.
22	"The Triple Six Committee"; Transliteration: "666-Ri iinkai (Toripurushikkusu)" (Japanese: 666人委員会（トリプルシックス）)	November 26, 2009
The reverse rejection reaction between Blade and Arclight is divided into three stages. The past memories are projected through several images, both of their abilities suddenly negates each other, and only one body will remain. Blade and Arclight engage in an intense battle, a fight to the finish. Although Blade manages to critically wound Arclight, the latter shows that he can regenerate his body. Saten, working for the Triple Six Committee, freezes all the committee members to death, after he sees that he no longer needs maintenance on his body thanks to Eve's abilities. Blade pushes Arclight to the outside, busting through the protective glass window. However, Saten appears outside the tower, revealing that he possesses the Byakugou, already having learned all acquired abilities. Furthermore, Saten is revealed to be Kannazuki, one of Gido's lab partners. Saten then takes Arclight and blasts him into flames.
23	"Saten"; Transliteration: "Saten" (Japanese: 左天)	December 3, 2009
Saten claims himself as the new leader of the Simeon Tower. He wants to claim Eve as the bearer of his future children, so he forcefully takes her into his arms and knocks her unconscious. It is implied that there are traces of Kazumi inside of Eve after the laboratory accident. Teruyama, Set and Solva combine their abilities for a grand attack, but Saten overpowers them with that of his own. Not even Setsuna, Kuchinashi and Mio can stop him with their abilities. After Riru mourns for Arclight and reminisces of her life spent with him, she uses her body as a sacrifice to revive him. Blade attempts to use his Byakugou on Saten, but the latter starts to dig into the former's chest. Arclight, first appearing as Riru, subdues Saten and shows that his heart and right eye are completely healed. Arclight then uses his Byakugou on Saten, but this does not start a reverse rejection reaction. Instead, by using the field generators around the tower, this consumes all of Saten's learned abilities while it erases his very existence at the same time. Before he vanishes, he returns Eve to Gido, who cries out for him.
24	"Cruz Schild"; Transliteration: "Kurusu ・ Shirudo" (Japanese: クルス・シルト)	December 10, 2009
Arclight, reborn as the "Second" using a mass of fragment cells, desires to annihilate all of humanity, even those with special abilities, to create a new world. After deeply damaging Cruz, Arclight easily defeats Blade, Teruyama, Set and Solva one by one, as they each come to fight him. However, when he tries to finish them all off, the fragment cells begin to reject his body at the top of the mass. Cruz is awakened by Eve's healing ability. The Simeon Girl Squadron join forces with the Blade Faction in an effort to stop Arclight, but they have no idea how to reach Arclight. Aruka suggests for Cruz to come up with a plan to reach Arclight before time runs out. The group is to create a catapult to get Blade to the top of the mass, each of them using their unique abilities. At the top, Blade uses his Byakugou on Arclight, killing him off with a "Death Penalty" attack for good.
