= List of Infinite Dendrogram volumes =

Infinite Dendrogram is a Japanese light novel series written by Sakon Kaidō. Originally published as a web novel, the series has since been published by Hobby Japan featuring illustrations by Taiki. As of December 1, 2025, twenty-three volumes and one extra have been published. The light novel series was adapted into a manga by Kami Imai and published by Hobby Japan, with sixteen volumes released as of August 3, 2026. Both the novel and manga series are licensed by J-Novel Club.

== Light novel ==
No.	Title	Original release date	English release date
1	Infinite Dendrogram Vol. 1: The Beginning of Possibility ＜Infinite Dendrogram＞-インフィニット・デンドログラム- Vol.1 可能性の始まり	November 1, 2016; 978-4-7986-1325-3	July 10, 2017; 978-1-7183-5500-2
Chapter Zero: Infinite Dendrogram; Chapter One: Nemesis; Chapter Two: Dinner and Intentions; Chapter Three: Start Point; Chapter Four: Tomb Labyrinth; Chapter Five: Superior; Chapter Six: Cat's Tea Party; Chapter Seven: Ordeal of Rookies; Epilogue; Bonus Short Stories; Brother Bear's Cooking; Marie's Cooking; Lei-Lei's Cooking; Cheshire's Cooking; Figaro and Cooking; Reiji's Cooking
2	Infinite Dendrogram Vol. 2: The Beasts of Undeath ＜Infinite Dendrogram＞-インフィニット・デンドログラム- Vol.2 超級激突	December 28, 2016; 978-4-7986-1363-5	August 29, 2017; 978-1-7183-5501-9
Prologue: The Emotions of the Dead; Chapter One: A Morning in Gideon; Chapter Two: Back-Alley Cliché; Chapter Three: A Maiden's Master; Chapter Four: The Two Leaders; Chapter Five: Revenant Ox-Horse; Chapter Six: Beyond the Radix Point; Epilogue: A Morning of Smiles; Conjunction Episode: The Night Before; Bonus Short Stories; Marilyn; Hugo and Piloting; Hugo and...; Carriage; The Prism Steed; License; Lei-Lei and Fishing
3	Infinite Dendrogram Vol. 3: Clash of the Superiors ＜Infinite Dendrogram＞-インフィニット・デンドログラム- Vol.3 超級激突	April 1, 2017; 978-4-7986-1432-8	October 31, 2017; 978-1-7183-5502-6
Prologue: One of the East's Mightiest; Chapter One: Lectures and Reunions; Chapter Two: Catching up; Interlude: Before the Festival; Chapter Three: Xunyu the Yinglong; Chapter Four: The Clash of the Superiors; Conjunction Episode: The End of the Match, the Beginning of Madness; Side Story: The Case of the Untamable Slime; Side Story: A Day Off in Gideon – Noon; Side Story: A Day Off in Gideon – Night; Bonus Short Stories; Marie's Story; Nemesis' Story; Figaro's Story; Eldridge's Story; Xunyu's Story
4	Infinite Dendrogram Vol. 4: Franklin's Game ＜Infinite Dendrogram＞-インフィニット・デンドログラム- Vol.4 フランクリンのゲーム	June 30, 2017; 978-4-7986-1478-6	January 9, 2018; 978-1-7183-5503-3
Continuation: Inside Their Minds; Chapter One: "The Weakest, The Worst" Superior; Chapter Two: Irregular Newbies; Chapter Three: The Movement on the Board; Chapter Four: Battle of the Artists; Chapter Four-Point-Five: Setting; Chapter Five: Yuri and Hugo; Chapter Six: The Duel in the Frozen Hell; Chapter Seven: The Right Arm of the Victor; Bonus Short Stories; A certain day of a certain month, a certain place in Tenchi; A certain day of a certain month, Giga Professor, Mr. Franklin; Chapter Semis: Brother Bear's Welcoming Party Preparations
5	Infinite Dendrogram Vol. 5: Those Who Bind the Possibilities ＜Infinite Dendrogram＞-インフィニット・デンドログラム- Vol.5 可能性を繋ぐ者達	September 30, 2017; 978-4-7986-1551-6	March 6, 2018; 978-1-7183-5504-0
Examination Chapter: ■■■ ■■■■■'s Analysis; Chapter One: Plan C; Chapter Two: Those Who Bind the Possibilities; Chapter Three: And His Name is...; Chapter Four: King of Destruction, Shu Starling; Chapter Five: Game, Set, Match; Epilogue A: The Superiors; Epilogue B: The Sisters; Epilogue C: Ray the Unbreakable; Extra: A Change of Clothing; Extra: Reiji's Everyday Life / Ray and Nemesis's Everyday Life; Bonus Short Stories; The Royal Capital, Altea; A certain day after Franklin's Game, Nemesis
6	Infinite Dendrogram Vol. 6: The Lunar Society ＜Infinite Dendrogram＞-インフィニット・デンドログラム- Vol.6 〈月世の会〉	January 31, 2018; 978-4-7986-1620-9	May 22, 2018; 978-1-7183-5505-7
Prologue: The Kingdom of Altar's Big Three; Chapter One: In the Jaws of the Fox; Chapter Two: The Maidens' Tea Party; Chapter Three: Lion and Fox, Light and Dark; Chapter Four: Real Life Encounter; Chapter Five: The Impossible Quest; Chapter Six: Along the Way; Chapter Seven: Cross Hunting; Chapter Eight: The Bad Dog and the Owner; Chapter Nine: To the Windy Village; Conjunction Episode: The News; Bonus Short Stories; KoD-Approved Popcorn – The Ultimate Snack; KoD-Approved Popcorn – The Commercial Jingle; Xunyu's Drawings; Brother Bear's Fashion Collection
7	Infinite Dendrogram Vol. 7: The Shield of Miracles ＜Infinite Dendrogram＞-インフィニット・デンドログラム- Vol.7 奇跡の盾	May 31, 2018; 978-4-7986-1705-3	September 11, 2018; 978-1-7183-5506-4
Conjunction Episode: The Tale of a Star; Chapter One: The Black Shield; Chapter Two: Ichiro Shijima; Chapter Three: The Real Ichiro Shijima; Chapter Four: Void of the Black Sky, Monochrome; Interlude: Family; Chapter Five: B. B. B.; Chapter Six: The Shield of Miracles; Chapter Seven: Soar High, Shooting Star; Epilogue; Side Story: The Case of the Unknown Murders – The Situation; Side Story: The Case of the Unknown Murders – The Solution; Side Story: Epilogue – Outlaw; Bonus Short Stories; Signed; A Certain Interview at a Certain Contractor's Office
8	Infinite Dendrogram Vol. 8: The Hope They Left Behind ＜Infinite Dendrogram＞-インフィニット・デンドログラム- Vol.8 遺された希望	September 28, 2018; 978-4-7986-1788-6	January 15, 2019; 978-1-7183-5507-1
Prologue One: A Glimpse Into Days Long Gone; Prologue Two: The Unearthed Ruins; Chapter One: Change of Clothing – Dark Edition; Chapter Two: "I Ran Into Someone Shady" x2; Chapter Three: It's Not Against the Rules; Chapter Four: The First Night; Chapter Five: Countess Quartierlatin; Chapter Six: Ruins; Chapter Seven: Power and Will; Chapter Eight: Freedom; Chapter Nine: The Three Armies; Conjunction: What Was Left Sleeping; Bonus Short Stories; A Break for the Orchestra; The Gold-Eating Bear; Miss Marie's Lesson for Newbies – Guns
9	Infinite Dendrogram Vol. 9: Blue Blood Blitz ＜Infinite Dendrogram＞-インフィニット・デンドログラム- Vol.9 双姫乱舞	February 1, 2019; 978-4-7986-1860-9	June 18, 2019; 978-1-7183-1514-3
Conjunction: The Unfinished Hope; Chapter One: Battle of the Fairy Tales; Chapter Two: Of Demons and Devils; Chapter Three: Legendary; Chapter Four: Gifted Barbaros; Chapter Five: His Reason; Chapter Six: Infinite Multiplication; Chapter Seven: The Superweapon; Chapter Eight: The Primeval Sword; Chapter Nine: Their Choice; Chapter Ten: The Warped Hope and the Shining Despair; Chapter Eleven: The End of a Hope; Epilogue A: The Imperium; Epilogue B: The Kingdom; Epilogue C: The Ancient Ones; Bonus Short Stories; Covert?; The Lynx's Monetary Affairs
10	Infinite Dendrogram Vol. 10: After the Storm, and Before the Storm ＜Infinite Dendrogram＞-インフィニット・デンドログラム- Vol.10 嵐の後、嵐の前	June 1, 2019; 978-4-7986-1945-3	October 22, 2019; 978-1-7183-1518-1
Prologue; Episode One: College; Side Story: A Certain Arrest; Episode Two: Seniors; Side Story: Crime and Invitation; Episode Three: Sister; Side Story: Valentine's Day of 2044; Episode Four: Consultation; Pallid Pages Part One: Spin the Roulette Wheel; Episode Five: Predicament; Side Story: Nightmare at the Gaol; Epilogue: After the Storm, and Before the Storm; Bonus Short Stories; Embryo Motifs; The Triangle of Bygone Days; The Relationship Between AAA and BBB; Sisters
11	Infinite Dendrogram Vol. 11: The Glory Selector ＜Infinite Dendrogram＞-インフィニット・デンドログラム- Vol.11 栄光の選別者	October 31, 2019; 978-4-7986-2041-1	April 7, 2020; 978-1-7183-1520-4
Opening; Act One: The Golden Calamity; Act Two: Claymill Absolute Defense Line; Act Three: The Selection of Despair; Interlude: At the Royal Castle; Act Four: Figaro's Choice; Act Five: The Departure of the Two Kings; Act Six: The Lion and the Dragon; Act Seven: The Gaze of the Moon and the Evil Eye; Act Eight: Unmatched God of War – Baldr; Interlude: The Worst and the Worst; Act Nine: Power and Power; Interlude: The Past Becomes the Present Becomes the Future; Bonus Short Stories; Powerleveling; The Overworked Control AI; A Story for Another Time
12	Infinite Dendrogram Vol. 12: The Forms of Love ＜Infinite Dendrogram＞-インフィニット・デンドログラム- Vol.12 アイのカタチ	January 31, 2020; 978-4-7986-2119-7	July 7, 2020; 978-1-7183-1522-8
Opening: Correspondence Between a Certain Man and Woman; Chapter One: The Three Horrors and the Extras; Chapter Two: Battle for the Penultimate Throne; Interlude: The One Who Arrives and the One Who Finds; Chapter Three: The Start of the Festival; Chapter Four: To Each Their Own Duels of Love; Chapter Five: The Lion and the Bomb; Chapter Six: The Fuse; Chapter Seven: The End of the Festival and the Explosion; Chapter Eight: A Story Written in the Sky; Chapter Nine: The ■■■■■■■■ of Figaro; Epilogue; Bonus Short Stories; A Mascot and His Puns; The Culinary Troubles of the Royalty and Nobility (Hell's Kitchen)
13	Infinite Dendrogram Vol. 13: Vorpal Rabbit, Vorpal Hare ＜Infinite Dendrogram＞-インフィニット・デンドログラム- Vol.13 バトル・オブ・ヴォーパルバニー	June 1, 2020; 978-4-7986-2229-3	December 8, 2020; 978-1-7183-5512-5
Prologue: Friends; Chapter One: The Third Job; Chapter Two: Clan; Chapter Three: The Fearsome Clan; Interlude: The Imperium's Preparations; Chapter Four: The Rabbit Skips Through the Darkness; Chapter Five: The Night Before the Peace Conference; Chapter Six: Peace Conference; Interlude: The Assault on Altea; Chapter Seven: Opened Hostilities; Chapter Eight: The Battle of the Masterless; Chapter Nine: Vorpal Rabbit, Vorpal Hare; Interlude: The Spectator; Bonus Short Stories; The Land of Strife; A Popcorn Deficiency
EX	Infinite Dendrogram Vol. EX ＜Infinite Dendrogram＞-インフィニット・デンドログラム- Vol.EX 童話分隊	July 1, 2020	—
14	Infinite Dendrogram Vol. 14: The Physical Apex ＜Infinite Dendrogram＞-インフィニット・デンドログラム- Vol.14 物理最強	October 1, 2020; 978-4-7986-2322-1	March 9, 2021; 978-1-7183-5513-2
Interlude: First Contact; Chapter Ten: Guardian-Jaguarman Theory; Chapter Eleven: The Black Mirror; Chapter Twelve: A Dear Friend; Chapter Thirteen: Trails in the Sky; Chapter From the Past: The First SUBM; Chapter Fourteen: Soaring and Indomitable; Chapter Fifteen: The Final Choice; Chapter Sixteen: The Conclusion; Chapter Seventeen: Aftermath; Interlude: Another Story; Bonus Short Stories; A Glimpse of the Past – "The Physical Apex"; A Glimpse of the Past – "The Queen of Beasts"
15	Infinite Dendrogram Vol. 15: GAME OVER ＜Infinite Dendrogram＞-インフィニット・デンドログラム- Vol.15 GAME OVER	February 1, 2021; 978-4-7986-2416-7	October 4, 2021; 978-1-7183-5514-9
Conjunction: The Game Board They Know as This World; Chapter Eighteen: Values; Chapter Nineteen: Hero; Chapter Twenty: The Fiery Dance of the Jiangshi and the Mummy; Chapter Twenty-One: The Blades and Shields of Altar; Chapter From the Past: Memories of Fire; Chapter Twenty-Two: What Was Sought; Chapter Twenty-Three: The Humanoid Irregularity; Chapter Twenty-Four: Don't Touch the GAME OVER; Chapter From the Past: What is Untouchable, What Shouldn't be Touched; Chapter Twenty-Five: The Incarnation of Maelstroms; Chapter Twenty-Six: Supernova; Chapter Twenty-Seven: A Life of Fire; Epilogue; The Final Epilogue: Him, Her, and...; Bonus Short Stories; The Royal Leech; The Green and the Blue; Dirty Money
16	Infinite Dendrogram Vol. 16: The Tartarean Possibilities ＜Infinite Dendrogram＞-インフィニット・デンドログラム- Vol.16 黄泉返る可能性	June 1, 2021; 978-4-7986-2505-8	December 30, 2021; 978-1-7183-5515-6
Prologue: Another Started Game; Chapter One: The Poisonous Oasis; Chapter Two: Minus; Chapter Three: The Gaunt Man; Chapter Four: The Chain; Chapter Five: The Machine Knight of Ice and Roses; Chapter Six: The Rebirthing Infestation, De Vermis; Chapter Seven: Standing and Indomitable; Prologue: Another First Choice; Chapter Eight: The Tartarean Possibility; Prologue: Another Starting Point; Epilogue: Two Worlds, Two Mes; Bonus Short Stories; Pandemonium; Bar Chatter; Similarity
17	Infinite Dendrogram Vol. 17: White Cat's Cradle ＜Infinite Dendrogram＞-インフィニット・デンドログラム- Vol.17 白猫クレイドル	November 1, 2021; 978-4-7986-2637-6	April 7, 2022; 978-1-7183-5516-3
Prologue: At the Water's Edge; Chapter One: The Invitation; Interlude: Outside and Within; Chapter Two: The Rules; Interlude: The Strongest Pieces on the Board; Chapter Three: The Dark Knight, the Nukenin, and the Fallen Angel; Chapter Four: Another Team Up; Interlude: The Scorpion, the Axe, and the Costume; Chapter Five: The Asura; Interlude: The Ranker Known as Chelsea; Chapter Six: The Asura and the Hunter; Interlude: The Crawler-Riders, the Magic-Spinners; Chapter Seven: A Hint; Interlude: Blade-Dance; Chapter Eight: To Beat the Invincible; Chapter Nine: Invincible Versus Invincible; Chapter Ten: Event Cleared; Chapter Eleven: The Knight and the Asura; Chapter Twelve: The Promise; Epilogue; Bonus Short Stories; The Ones From Tenchi; Shion's Stresses; The B and the C
18	Infinite Dendrogram Vol. 18: King of Crime ＜Infinite Dendrogram＞-インフィニット・デンドログラム- Vol.18 King of Crime	April 1, 2022; 978-4-7986-2756-4	September 01, 2022; 978-1-7183-5517-0
Prologue: The Minority's Justice, The Majority's Evil; Chapter One: Real-Life Relationships; Chapter Two: Invitation; Interlude; Chapter Three: The First Clan Meeting; Interlude; Chapter Four: The Ring and the Axe; Chapter Five: Homes, Sweet Homes; Chapter Six: Rumination and Reminiscence; Chapter Seven: Love Letter; Chapter Eight: Gods of Destruction and Creation; Chapter Nine: In Skies of Twilight and Dawn; Epilogue; Bonus Short Stories; Founding IF: The Unknown Story; Smol Gar; Unintended Terror
19	Infinite Dendrogram Vol. 19: The Overlord of Dreams ＜Infinite Dendrogram＞-インフィニット・デンドログラム- Vol.19 幻夢境の王	September 1, 2022; 978-4-7986-2888-2	February 23, 2023; 978-1-7183-5518-7
Prologue: The Sword and the Axe; Chapter One: The First Battle; Chapter Two: Remembering and Overlooking; Chapter Three: The Next Stage; Chapter Four: Encounters; Interlude: An Overlord's Domain; Chapter Five: The Dream-Quest of Unknown Meetings; Chapter Six: Dreamscape Assailant; Interlude: The Village of the Overlord; Chapter Seven: A Battle He Can Lose; Chapter Eight: Finest in the Right, Strongest in the Left; Chapter Nine: The Dream's End; Epilogue: Alone in the Dark; Bonus Short Stories; Bags Under the Eyes; Getting Content; The Oddballs
20	Infinite Dendrogram Vol. 20: A Capriccio on the Sands ＜Infinite Dendrogram＞-インフィニット・デンドログラム- Vol.20 砂上の狂騒曲(カプリッチオ)	March 1, 2023; 978-4-7986-3043-4	October 10, 2023; 978-1-7183-1538-9
Prologue: The Three's Circumstances and a Single Stage; Chapter One: The Part-Time Job and the Man Who Calls Himself Vulgar; Chapter Two: The Luxury Liner and Its Troublesome Passengers; Interlude: The Test and the Mechanical Dragon; Chapter Three: The Search and the Encounter; Chapter Four: A Party Battlefield and Terrorism; Interlude: The Girl and the Spark; Chapter Five: Cascading Chaos; Interlude: Pale Death; Chapter Six: The Goblin and the Murder-Demon; Chapter Seven: The Jester and the Dragon; Chapter Eight: The Three-Way Fight and the Final Choice; Chapter Nine: The White Rose and the Corpse of Glory; Interlude: The Third and the Crystal; Epilogue: One Incident, Three Futures; Bonus Short Stories; The Singularity; Altar's PK History; About La Crima
21	Infinite Dendrogram Vol. 21: Godslayer <Infinite Dendrogram>-インフィニット・デンドログラム- 21.神殺し	September 29, 2023; 978-4-7986-3307-7	April 26, 2024; 978-1-7183-1540-2
Prologue: Tournament Day Two; Chapter One: Tournament Day Three; Interlude: Tournament Day Four; Chapter Two: Tournament Day Six / He Who Lost His Other Half; Interlude: Lunchtime; Chapter Three: Miss Zeta's Expository Lecture—Job Builds; Chapter Four: The Invited Immortals; Interlude: Tournament Days Seven and Eight; Chapter Five, Opening: The [King of Plagues] Incident; Interlude: Records and Memories; Chapter Five, Closing: Godslayer; Interlude: A Story That Was Spoken and a Story Untold; Conjunction: From the Depths
22	Infinite Dendrogram Vol. 22: When Stars Align <Infinite Dendrogram>-インフィニット・デンドログラム- 22.星辰揃いしとき	October 1, 2024; 978-4-7986-3502-6	June 24, 2025; 978-1-7183-1542-6
Prologue: Star Guidance; Chapter One: The Fallen Angel and the Arch Enemy; Interlude: Morning of the Final Day; Chapter Two: The Man Who Shouldn't Be Here; Chapter Three: GG; Chapter Four: Lunchtime; Chapter Five: The Night's Arrival; Chapter Six: The Fatal Fight, the Overlord's Descent; Chapter Seven: Sunken Labyrinth; Chapter Eight: Beneath the Starry Sky; Chapter Nine: Paradigm Shift; Chapter Ten: Star of Death; Chapter Eleven: Bringing the Climax; Epilogue: Sea Light, Star Light; After Story: The Viewer and the Streamer; Bonus Short Story; G Channel: Job Build
SP1	Infinite Dendrogram SP Volume 1: The Southern Cross (Part 1) <Infinite Dendrogram>-インフィニット・デンドログラム- SP.1 南海編（上）	October 1, 2024; 978-4-7986-3657-3	September 9, 2025; 978-1-7183-1544-0
Opening: It Begins with a Fateful Coincidence???; Act 1: It Rises with a Furry Form; Interlude 1; Act 2: Chimera; Interlude 2; Act 3: Their Agreement; Interlude 3; Act 4: Resolve Compared; Interlude 4; Act 5: From the Abyss; Conjunction: The Meaning of the Name; Bonus Short Story; New Yamato
SP2	Infinite Dendrogram SP Volume 2: The Southern Cross (Part 2) <Infinite Dendrogram>-インフィニット・デンドログラム- SP.2 南海編（下）	December 27, 2024; 978-4-7986-3724-2	December 16, 2025; 978-1-7183-1546-4
Conjunction; Act 6: Light of Hope; Act 7: Invincibility Unraveled; Interlude 6; Act 8: Rusalka; Interlude 7; Act 9: Preparations; Interlude 8; Act 10: Operation Southern Cross; Act 11: Within the Light; Final Chapter: Beneath the Clearing Sky; To the Next Stage; Bonus Short Story; On the Seadragon King
23	Infinite Dendrogram Vol. 23: Hide and Seek <Infinite Dendrogram>-インフィニット・デンドログラム- 23.ハイド・アンド・シーク	December 1, 2025; 978-4-7986-3860-7	July 27, 2026; 978-1-7183-2320-9
SP3	Infinite Dendrogram SP Volume 3: The Legacy of a Genius <Infinite Dendrogram>-インフィニット・デンドログラム- SP.3 天才の遺産	February 28, 2026; 978-4-7986-4119-5	October 14, 2026; 978-1-7183-2384-1

== Manga ==
No.	Title	Original release date	English release date
1	Infinite Dendrogram Vol. 1 (インフィニット・デンドログラム1)	May 27, 2017; 978-4-7986-1457-1	June 17, 2019; 978-1-7183-3900-2
1. Infinite Dendrogram; 2. Nemesis; 3. Dinner & Intentions; 4. Job Change & An Encounter; 5. The Starting Point
2	Infinite Dendrogram Vol. 2 (インフィニット・デンドログラム2)	January 27, 2018; 978-4-7986-1613-1	October 8, 2019; 978-1-7183-3902-6
6. Tomb Labyrinth; 7. Superior; 8. <Over Gladiator> Figaro; 9. The Feast; 10. Temptation
3	Infinite Dendrogram Vol. 3 (インフィニット・デンドログラム3)	July 27, 2018; 978-4-7986-1736-7	February 5, 2020; 978-1-7183-3904-0
11. Gardranda; 12. A New Power; 13. The Rookies' Ordeal; 14. Morning in Gideon; 15. Doggy Doggy Panic
4	Infinite Dendrogram Vol. 4 (インフィニット・デンドログラム4)	January 26, 2019; 978-4-7986-1827-2	July 1, 2020; 978-1-7183-3906-4
16. Back Alley Cliché; 17. A United Front; 18. Undead; 19. The Two Leaders; 20. Cocytus
5	Infinite Dendrogram Vol. 5 (インフィニット・デンドログラム5)	June 27, 2019; 978-4-7986-1951-4	October 7, 2020; 978-1-7183-3908-8
21. Power of the Undead; 22. Wrath; 23. Revenant Ox-Horse; 24. The Dream; 25. Beyond the Radix Point
6	Infinite Dendrogram Vol. 6 (インフィニット・デンドログラム6)	October 26, 2019; 978-4-7986-2031-2	January 6, 2021; 978-1-7183-3910-1
26. The Awakening; 27. A Morning Smile; 28. The Night Before; 29. From the East; 30. A Lecture and Reunion
7	Infinite Dendrogram Vol. 7 (インフィニット・デンドログラム7)	May 27, 2020; 978-4-7986-2212-5	April 7, 2021; 978-1-7183-3912-5
31. Story After Story; 32. Before the Festival; 33. Xunyu the Yinglong; 34. Clash of the Superiors; 35. Clash of the Superiors 2
8	Infinite Dendrogram Vol. 8 (インフィニット・デンドログラム8)	February 1, 2021; 978-4-7986-2409-9	October 6, 2021; 978-1-7183-3914-9
36. Clash of the Superiors 3; 37. The Duel Ends, the Carnage Begins; 38. The Weakest, the Worst; 39. Unusual Rookies; 40. Offense and Defense
9	Infinite Dendrogram Vol. 9 (インフィニット・デンドログラム9)	October 1, 2021; 978-4-7986-2624-6	January 5, 2022; 978-1-7183-3916-3
41. Battle of the Artists I 42. Battle of the Artists II; 43. Battle of the Artists III; 44. Battle of the Artists IV; 45. Yuri and Hugo
10	Infinite Dendrogram Vol. 10 (インフィニット・デンドログラム10)	June 1, 2022; 978-4-7986-2849-3	August 3, 2022; 978-1-7183-3918-7
46. The Duel in the Frozen Hell; 47. The Duel in the Frozen Hell II; 48. The Duel in the Frozen Hell III; 49. The Duel in the Frozen Hell IV; 50. The Right Arm of the Victor
11	Infinite Dendrogram Vol. 11 (インフィニット・デンドログラム11)	March 1, 2023; 978-4-7986-3099-1	December 6, 2023; 978-1-7183-3919-4
51. The Right Arm of the Victor II; 52. The Right Arm of the Victor III; 53. The Right Arm of the Victor IV; 54. Plan C 55. Those Who Bind the Possibilities
12	Infinite Dendrogram Vol. 12 (インフィニット・デンドログラム12)	September 29, 2023; 978-4-7986-3306-0	July 3, 2024; 978-1-7183-3920-0
56. Those Who Bind the Possibilities II; 57. His Name Is...; 58. King Of Destruction, Shu Starling; 59. Game, Set, Match
13	Infinite Dendrogram Vol. 13 (インフィニット・デンドログラム13)	July 1, 2024; 978-4-7986-3573-6	September 3, 2025; 978-1-7183-3921-7
14	Infinite Dendrogram Vol. 14 (インフィニット・デンドログラム14)	May 1, 2025; 978-4-7986-3846-1	December 24, 2025; 978-1-7183-3922-4
15	Infinite Dendrogram Vol. 15 (インフィニット・デンドログラム15)	December 1, 2025; 978-4-7986-4023-5	—
16	Infinite Dendrogram Vol. 16 (インフィニット・デンドログラム16)	August 3, 2026; 978-4-7986-4254-3	—
