= Needless =

Japanese manga series

- Manga volume 1, featuring Eve Neuschwanstein (left) and Adam Blade
- Genre: Action; Science fiction comedy
- Manga
- Written by: Kami Imai
- Published by: Shueisha
- Magazine: Ultra Jump
- Original run: October 18, 2003 – June 19, 2013
- Volumes: 16
- Anime television series
- Directed by: Masayuki Sakoi
- Produced by: Hiroshi Kawamura; Yukiko Ninokata; Yuuka Sakurai; Hirotsugu Oogo
- Written by: Satoru Nishizono
- Music by: Tatsuya Kato; Masaaki Iizuka
- Studio: Madhouse (Note: Animation production assistance (アニメーション制作協力) for all episodes provided by Imagin.)
- Licensed by: AUS: Siren Visual; NA: Sentai Filmworks; UK: MVM Films
- Original network: Tokyo MX, MBS, TVS, tvk, THK
- English network: NA: Anime Network
- Original run: July 3, 2009 – December 11, 2009
- Episodes: 24
- icon

Needless (stylized in all caps) is a Japanese manga series written and illustrated by Kami Imai. It was serialized in Shueisha's seinen manga magazine Ultra Jump from October 2003 to June 2013, with its chapters collected in 16 tankōbon volumes. A 24-episode anime television series adaptation by Madhouse aired from July to December 2009. The anime was licensed for English release in North America by Sentai Filmworks.

== Synopsis ==
This anime is set in the year 2130 (the beginning date remains unclear), 50 years after World War III. The war has left a crater where Tokyo once stood, a place now filled with contaminated rubble. This spot, known as "The Black Spot", has no electrical power (with the exception being the Simeon building) and is seen as a dark spherical patch from outer space and one of many Black Spots across Japan. The Black Spot eventually becomes populated by outcasts, some of whom, as a result of the contamination, gain various powers called "fragments". Those in possession of such fragments come to be known as "Needless".

== Characters ==
=== The Misfits ===
Adam Blade (アダム・ブレイド, Adamu Bureido)
Voiced by: Takehito Koyasu (Japanese); Andrew Love (English)
Adam Blade is a destroyer priest who lives in the church in Sector 533. He has a metal collar engraved with the characters '079.AB.' affixed to his neck. He has inhuman strength and endurance as well as accelerated healing, plus a skeletal structure attached with a special metal called Orichalcum. It was revealed that he is a clone of the strongest Needless, 'The Second Christ'. His only flaw is his attraction to cute, young girls. His fragment 'Zero' allows him to learn the attacks of his enemies, after being hit by it or seeing it, also being able to combine other abilities learned as well. His special move is 'Death Verdict', the final pronouncement when taking an enemy's life.
Eve Neuschwanstein (イヴ・ノイシュヴァンシュタイン, Ivu Noishuvanshutain)
Voiced by: Eri Kitamura (Japanese); Brittney Karbowski (English)
Eve Neuschwanstein is Blade's partner. She is bad at remembering other people's names. Even though she has the appearance of a young girl, she is proven to be a capable fighter. Her fragment is 'Doppelganger', an ability which allows her to shapeshift into anything (from a drill on her arm to other person's appearances). She is also shown to be able to shapeshift into a wall, which is inorganic. The weakness of this power is that she needs a lot of calories to use it. Therefore, she often drinks an energy drink named 'Super Gel Dero Doro Drink', which contains 5000 kilocalories.
Cruz Schild (クルス・シルト, Kurusu Shirudo)
Voiced by: Aya Endo (Japanese); Luci Christian (English)
Cruz Schild is a young boy, whose big sister Aruka is presumably killed during a Testament attack. He is a bit of a wimp, but shows certain qualities and strengths and is the only known survivor of the uprising against Simeon. He remains highly committed to the memory of Aruka, often addressing her directly in his thoughts, and is seen carrying a pendant with a picture of her in it. He is often used as a sort of gofer by some of the other team members (most notably Blade and Eve). While shown as physically weak compared to most of the other characters, his keen observational skills and raw intellect more than make up for this deficiency.
Gido (ギド)
Voiced by: Kenji Utsumi (Japanese); David Wald (English)
Gido an elderly scientist with an attitude, and his real name is Gin Rikudo (六道 銀, Rikudo Gin). He lives with Blade and Eve in the church as their father figure. He has no fragment, but is extremely intelligent and knowledgeable about current events. He seems to know more about Arclight than he lets on. Eventually it was discovered that he was the head of the Simeon initiative to clone the Second and presided over the creation of the two Adams and Eve, after 77 failures where the clone bodies would tear themselves apart. He handled the children's early development and after Arclight's actions destroyed their establishment, he took them away and raised them. Since the incident, he took care of Blade and Eve and lived with them in the Black Spot to avoid chase from the government.
Disc (ディスク, Disuku)
Voiced by: Emiri Katō (Japanese); Serena Varghese (English)
Disc is a cyborg who resided in Iron Mountain. Even though she has the appearance of a young girl, she is actually 100 years old. After the incident in Iron Mountain, she joins forces with Blade to take out Simeon. Her fragment is 'Scan', which allows her to learn her opponent's power and other things such as their BWH measurements. She was found by Cruz along with Eve after the PF Zero blast, but her body is damaged. From then until City arc, she only appears as a head, using her pigtails to move, and controlling a testament for long-distance travel. She has grown affectionate of Cruz ever since he cross-dressed as a girl.
Momiji Teruyama (照山 最次, Teruyama Momiji)
Voiced by: Kentarō Itō (Japanese); Rob Mungle (English)
Momiji Teruyama is a Needless with flame abilities who first appears to fight Blade to avenge his fallen comrades and was easily beaten. However, it is revealed that the one that he is searching for is Adam Arclight, not Adam Blade. He joins forces with Blade to fight against Simeon Tower. His abilities include 'Little Boy', where he lights his fist on fire to create an explosive punch. He can also use the ability 'Vulcan Shock Ignition', which basically looks like a giant fireball which he throws at the enemy.
Set (セト, Seto)
Voiced by: Kaori Fukuhara (Japanese); Maggie Flecknoe (English)
Set is a young girl holding a large sword with a skull design handle. She is a prominent member of the Black Spot's mercenary guild. For a while, due to unknown circumstances, Blade became her partner. Her fragment is 'Gravitation', an ability that lets her control gravity. She is obsessed with money and became a mercenary to earn tons of it. After the PF Zero Blast, she reappeared alongside Blade and Solva and finished off Hatfield. She and Solva remained behind to defend the town from future attacks.
Solva (ソルヴァ, Soruvua)
Voiced by: Asami Imai (Japanese); Elizabeth Bunch (English)
Solva is a young girl with magnets in her hair. Her fragment, which is 'Magnetic World', grants her power to manipulate metals and create a magnetic shock wave. Disc mentioned that her fragment is a unique magnetic field and that she can repel almost every attack in a hundred meter radius. She is sweet and charming on the outside but is a menace and a sadistic person on the inside. Solva is the leader of a gang of bandits called The Predators. After being defeated by Blade and Set, she seems to have become Set's partner, when Blade left them. She is a megalomaniac, in which her desire is for everyone to bow down before her as the ruler of Black Spot. After the PF Zero Blast, she reappeared along Blade and Set and killed Hatfield. She and Set remained behind to defend the town from future attacks.

=== Simeon Upper Management ===
Adam Arclight (アダム・アークライト, Adamu Ākuraito)
Voiced by: Hiroki Tōchi (Japanese); David Matranga (English)
Adam Arclight is a mysterious artificial life form similar to Blade with the characters '078.AA.' affixed to his neck, revealed to be attempt to create a clone of the strongest Needless, 'The Second Christ'. But Arclight's right eye and heart rejected the cloned cells and he was deemed a failure and left for dead at a landfill. However, Arclight survived, and made it back to the laboratory to absorb the Second's corpse to become incredibly powerful. From there, Arclight rose through the ranks of Simeon and took over interests in the Black Spot, building the Simeon Tower while using the Needless Hunt to find a means to cure his continued mutation. His fragment 'Positive Feedback Zero', is an ability similar to Adam Blade's fragment that allows him to learn the attacks of his enemies, either from physical conduct or seeing it. But Arclight's fragment has the added effect of combine learned abilities and intensifying the strength each time it is used, along with altering his body structure when needed. Eventually, Arclight is revealed to be a cloned god form of the real Adam Arclight and is destroyed once he served his purpose.
Riru Roukakuji (楼閣寺 離瑠, Rōkakuji Riru)
Voiced by: Megumi Toyoguchi (Japanese); Taylor Hannah (English)
Riru Roukakuji is a well endowed woman who is one of the Simeon Tower's Four Elite, serving as both Arclight's right-hand woman and leader of the Simeon Girl Squadron. Her fragment is 'Psychokinesis', a form of telekinesis and she is possibly the only one who possesses it, as hinted by Disc that this ability is pretty rare and the most powerful out of all fragments. Originally a subject in Eve series, Riru ruled her own Black Spot until she met Arclight, falling in love with him. While the manga has her betrayed by Saten and her own subordinates, the anime depicts Riru sacrificing herself to fully restore Archlight's physical form.
Saten (左天)
Voiced by: Kishō Taniyama (Japanese); Leraldo Anzaldua (English)
The strongest of Simeon Tower's Four Elite, Saten is one of Arclight's first followers yet acts on his own agenda as he withholds information like Blade's residence. During his fight with Eve, revealed to have feelings for her, Saten went easy on her and feigned defeat so she can save Cruz. His fragment 'Thermal Energy Conversion' allow him to use his Fourth Wave (Daiyon Haddou) ability to absorb thermal energy and redirect it in various ways like freezing objects or releasing absorbed energy as a powerful thermal wave. Eventually, revealing his true fragment to be 'Positive Feedback Zero', Saten is revealed to be the real Adam Arclight as he eliminates both his body double and Riru once they outlived their purpose. In the anime's story, Saten was originally Gido's assistant Kyoji Kanazuki who the Triple Six Committee made into a pseudo-Adam. Eventually, once he memorize Eve's Doppelganger Fragment, Saten turned on Triple Six and then seemingly kills Arclight. But Arclight reconstitutes himself, stealing Saten's power while using satellites to destroy the traitor's body.
Uten (右天)
Voiced by: Mayumi Yamaguchi (Japanese); Greg Ayres (English)
Uten is another one of the Four Elite of the Simeon Tower and the right-hand man of Arclight. His fragment is 'Bermuda Athport', which allows him to turn anything transparent. He hides this with hidden knives and guns and other tricks to make it seem like he has the power to create anything out of thin air. He is a true magician who only seems amazing until the trick is discovered. He is defeated and killed by Eve when Cruz exposed his power. It is revealed that Uten is not his real name but the name he took when he became Arclight's hand.
Aruka Schild (アルカ・シルト, Aruka Shirudo)
Voiced by: Mariya Ise (Japanese); Maggie Flecknoe (Episode 1), Carli Mosier (Episodes 14-24) (English)
Aruka Schild is the older sister of Cruz Schild as well as a member of the resistance force that were massacred by Simeon, usually wearing featureless white masks. She was believed to have died while protecting Cruz from a Testament. In reality, she is the final member of the Four Elite of the Simeon Tower and the one that leaked the resistance force's information to Simeon. Her fragment, 'Agni Schiwatas' (or 'The Breath of Fire' in English) allows her to speed up kinetic energy resulting in massive explosion and melting solid objects. Like Cruz, she can also analyze the abilities and weaknesses of others, using this insight along with her power to crush her enemies in seconds.
Kafka (カフカ, Kafuka)
Voiced by: Fuminori Komatsu (Japanese); Chris Patton (English)
Kafka is the first Needless to be defeated by both Blade and Eve. He works for Simeon and was an assassin sent out to kill Blade. His fragment 'Kandata String' allows him to generate powerful threads from his body, also create variations in the form of strings of cloth and tentacles. He is one of three members in a special group called the "Flea Team", alongside Gregoire and Zamusa, tasked to scout for information.
Gregoire (グレゴール, Guregōru)
Gregoire is a woman seen at the meeting after the battle at Simeon Tower. She has pointed ears, reportedly linked to her fragment which is called 'Hell's Ear', which allow her to hear any conversation. She is one of three members in a special group called the "Flea Team", alongside Kafka and Zamusa, tasked to scout for information.
Zamusa (ザムザ)
Zamusa is a man seen at the meeting after the battle at Simeon Tower. His fragment 'Clairvoyance' allows him to see to solid objects. He is one of three members in a special group called the "Flea Team", alongside Kafka and Gregoire, tasked to scout for information.
Hatfield (ハットフィールド, Hattofīrudo)
Hatfield is a Needless in dandy clothes, complete with a hat, suit and cane. He is an extremely intelligent and crafty villain His fragment, which is called 'Rainmaker', allows him to summon and control rain, as well as manipulate water into any kinds of weapon, including hammer and razor blades. His signature attack is 'Rain Laser', which fires super compressed streams of water that can pierce through even steel or diamonds. Hatfield states that only a few Needless can actually challenge him in an outdoor fight. He was able to defeat his enemies single-handed without so much as taking a single hit. Hatfield fights in a way he thinks is gentlemanly in that he allows his opponents the chance to attack him as a group, but he is not above using underhand methods to win if things do not go his way.
Ishiyama (いしやま)
Voiced by: Mitsuo Senda (Japanese); Chris Ayres (English)
A member of the Triple Six Committee. His fragment allows him to look into other's memories. He also has displayed superhuman athleticism and stick to walls.

=== Simeon Girl Squadron ===
Setsuna (セツナ)
Voiced by: Saori Gotō (Japanese); Jessica Boone (English)
Setsuna is another one of three the members of the Simeon Girl Squadron. She seems to be the leader of the three as well as the oldest. Her fragment is 'Speed', being able to travel at speeds.
Kuchinashi (梔)
Voiced by: Minori Chihara (Japanese); Hilary Haag (English)
Kuchinashi is another one of the three members of the Simeon Girl Squadron. A silent girl whose fragment is 'Fragrance', an ability that can control the brain and nervous system of the body once they inhale it. The scent of her fragment comes from a large fan on her left arm. She writes what she wants to say on a notepad. After Kurumi was killed, Kuchinashi used her most powerful fragrance 'Lilith Temptation', which makes people see their greatest desire. But it failed on Blade because he already had his desire, to be in a room full of cute girls.
Mio (未央)
Voiced by: Yui Makino (Japanese); Hilary Haag (English)
Mio is one of the three members of the Simeon Girl Squadron. She appears to be the youngest out of the three by both appearance and the way she speaks. Her fragment is 'Power', giving her superhuman strength. She has an affection for Blade, and is one of the few people in the series who refers to Cruz by his name.
Kurumi (胡桃)
Voiced by: Yū Shimamura (Japanese); Lesley Tesh (English)
Kurumi, though not a direct member of the Simeon Girl Squadron, fought with them during the battle in Shelter No. 3. Her fragment is 'Black Attraction', which allows her to implant ESP Viruses into people to control their thoughts and their actions. Kurumi's fragment is not meant for battle so that makes her only an observer.
Nanami (七海)
Voiced by: Mayuko Takahashi
Nanami is a member of a rival girl squad team of Setsuna's, her fate is much different between manga and anime. In the manga, Nanami was paralyzed by Kuchinashi and thrown into a wall by Mio, killing her, after it is revealed that she made them look bad. In the anime she loses a contest to Setsuna's three girl team and is humiliated. Her fragment gave her the power over water.
Misaki (美咲)
Voiced by: Megumi Toyoguchi
Misaki is another member of a rival girl squad team of Setsuna's, her fate is much different between manga and anime. As it was revealed that they had told Ruri of a failure on Mio's part, Setsuna use her fragment ability and went behind Misaki and stab her hand through Misaki's abdomen, killing her. In the anime she is humiliated along with Nanami. Her fragment allowed her to control land.
Rin (凜)
Rin is introduced as a student of the normal class in St. Rose Academy. She is a member of the newspaper club and is the culprit behind the "Invisible Bomber" incidents. Rin hid the fact she was a Needless from St. Rose in order to stay in the normal class because the Needless class had the risk of death during training. The reason behind the bombings were to kill off the top students in the normal class so that she would make it over the cut line and be placed in the active squad. Her fragment is called 'Bionic Compressor', which allows her to increase air pressure. She is defeated by the Black Madam and is expelled from St. Rose Academy.
The Black Madam (マダム・ブラック, Madamu Burakku)
The Black Madam is the headmistress of St. Rose Academy. She is the one who oversees young Needless girls training them into killer girls. She strongly believes in the ideals of the academy, stating that in the language of flowers, the "rose" stands for "beauty, "maiden, and secrets". This belief is so strong that the Black Madam was not angry when at the fact that Rin killed her fellow students, but rather it was for the cowardly way she killed them and for letting her power to make her conceited and unladylike. The Black Madam dresses like a Victorian aristocrat complete with an umbrella, outfitted with steel. She states her reason is because she believes that damage is identified by the amount of damage the wearers clothes have, therefore she cannot be harmed by what she wears. Her fragment is called 'Wind', giving her control over wind.

=== Other ===
Kanna (カンナ)
Voiced by: Kei Shindō (Japanese); Stephanie Wittels (English)
Kanna is a young girl who apparently attacked Solva and her group along with her two henchmen. She seemed to control both fire and ice. In reality it was through a machinery behind her throne and Solva and her group were the bandits. Kanna defends her father's treasure, the only patch of land in the Black Spot where flowers grow, giant sunflowers to be specific. Much later, Cruz's search for Set and Solva led them to Kanna's town only to find that Simeon had taken it over, With Kanna and her two helpers currently fighting them. It is also revealed that Kanna really is a Needless whose fragment is 'Over Technology', giving her the power to wield pieces of metal into complex machines as long as her idea of design is very specific and complex.
Zakard (ザカート, Zakādo)
Voiced by: Hiroshi Tsuchida (Japanese); Justin Doran (English)
Zakard is the leader of the Black Spot resistance force. He and his group attempted to stop Arclight from conquering the Black Spot and murdering innocent Needless. Zakard was very observant, suspecting Aruka from the start but realizing that Cruz was a truly honest soul. So he gave Cruz a pendant with her picture saying it was from her, not telling him it actually contained the data chip Arclight wanted so badly. However he did fall for the Aruka's trap and he and his resistance force were faced with Arclight and the Four Elite. Zakard personally fought Arclight. Zakard was in truth a Needless with a powerful fragment called 'Boulder Avalanche', which allowed him to make an armor of regenerative rock formed around him. But Zakard was still dominated and destroyed by Arclight and his many copied fragments. But Zakard was still defiant to the end, and denied Arclight what he most wanted for a while.
Secondaria (セカンダリ, Sekandari)
Secondaria is a maid who reported to Saten during the initial fight in Shelter No. 3.
Strom (ストレム, Sutoremu)
Strom is one of the most powerful Needless with ice abilities with dark skin and a bizarre fashion sense that stems from his daughters personal taste. His personality while fighting is like his fragment, cold and brutal. He does not hesitate to give blows that would cripple or kill his enemies, the exception seen is with woman which may stem from his daughter's influence, and he finds pleasure in fighting and destroying his opponents. Saten has stated that Strom is the one Needless (other than Arclight) that Saten can not win against due to Strom having the power to rob Saten of all the heat he can utilize with his fragment.

== Media ==
=== Manga ===
Written and illustrated by Kami Imai, Needless was serialized in Shueisha's seinen manga magazine Ultra Jump from October 18, 2003, to June 19, 2013. Shueisha collected its chapters in sixteen tankōbon volumes, released from June 18, 2004, to September 19, 2013. Additionally, a prequel, Needless Zero, was collected in two volumes, released on January 19, 2004, and June 19, 2009.

=== Anime ===
An anime television series adaptation of Needless was announced in March 2009. The series was animated by Madhouse and directed by Masayuki Sakoi. It was broadcast for twenty-four episodes on Tokyo MX, MBS, TV Saitama, TV Kanagawa and Tokai TV from July 3 to December 11, 2009. (Note: Tokyo MX listed the air dates for the series on Thursday at 25:30, which is effectively Friday at 1:30 a.m. JST.) The first opening theme is "Modern Strange Cowboy" by GRANRODEO and the first ending is "Aggressive Zone" by Needless★Girls (a group composed of the series' voice actresses, Aya Endo, Eri Kitamura, Emiri Katō, Saori Gotō and Yui Makino). The second opening theme is "Scarlet Bomb!" by Aki Misato and the second ending theme is "WANTED! for the love" by Needless★Girls. Gargoyle also contributed the insert songs "Shi ni Itaru Kizu" (死にいたる傷) and "Magma Kid" (マグマキッド, Maguma Kiddo).

In North America, Section23 Films announced in November 2010 that Sentai Filmworks licensed the series and that it would be released on Blu-ray and DVD. Two sets were released on February 15 and April 12, 2011, respectively. The series was also streamed on the Anime Network and Hulu. The anime was licensed Australia and New Zealand by Siren Visual and in the United Kingdom by MVM Entertainment.

== Reception ==
The anime drew comparisons to the work of Hiroyuki Imaishi.
