= Infinite Dendrogram =

Japanese light novel series

- First light novel volume cover

＜Infinite Dendrogram＞-インフィニット・デンドログラム- (Infinitto Dendoroguramu)
- Genre: Isekai
- Novel series
- Written by: Sakon Kaidō
- Published by: Shōsetsuka ni Narō
- Original run: 2015 – present
- Light novel
- Written by: Sakon Kaidō
- Illustrated by: Taiki
- Published by: Hobby Japan
- English publisher: NA: J-Novel Club
- Imprint: HJ Bunko
- Original run: November 1, 2016 – present
- Volumes: 23 + 3 specials + 1 extra
- Manga
- Illustrated by: Kami Imai
- Published by: Hobby Japan
- English publisher: NA: J-Novel Club
- Imprint: HJ Comics
- Magazine: Comic Fire
- Original run: December 22, 2016 – present
- Volumes: 16
- Manga

Crow Record: Infinite Dendrogram Another
- Illustrated by: La-na
- Published by: Media Factory
- Magazine: Monthly Comic Alive
- Original run: May 27, 2019 – February 26, 2021
- Volumes: 4
- Anime television series
- Directed by: Tomoki Kobayashi
- Written by: Yūichirō Momose
- Music by: Kenji Hiramatsu
- Studio: NAZ
- Licensed by: Crunchyroll: SEA: Medialink
- Original network: AT-X, Tokyo MX, BS11, SUN
- English network: US: Crunchyroll Channel
- Original run: January 9, 2020 – April 16, 2020
- Episodes: 13
- icon

Infinite Dendrogram (＜Infinite Dendrogram＞-インフィニット・デンドログラム-, Infinitto Dendoroguramu) is a Japanese light novel series written by Sakon Kaidō and illustrated by Taiki. It began serialization online in 2015 on the user-generated novel publishing website Shōsetsuka ni Narō. It was acquired by Hobby Japan, who published the first light novel volume in November 2016 under their HJ Bunko imprint. Twenty-three volumes and one extra have been released as of December 2025. A manga adaptation with art by Kami Imai has been serialized via Hobby Japan's Comic Fire website since December 2016. It has been collected in sixteen tankōbon volumes. Both the light novel and manga have been licensed in North America by J-Novel Club. An anime television series adaptation by NAZ aired from January to April 2020.

== Premise ==
In the year 2043, the virtual reality MMORPG Infinite Dendrogram is released, featuring the ability to perfectly simulate players' five senses. Nearly two years later, Reiji Mukudori enters the world of Infinite Dendrogram and assumes the name "Ray Starling", and upon his arrival, he is joined by his more experienced brother Shuu and his Embryo companion Nemesis. As Ray explores the world of Infinite Dendrogram, he learns to make a life for himself there and meets different kinds of friends and foes.

== Characters ==
Reiji Mukudori (椋鳥 玲二, Mukudori Reiji) / Ray Starling (レイ・スターリング, Rei Sutāringu)
Voiced by: Soma Saito (Japanese); Kyle Phillips (English)
The protagonist. A soon-to-be college freshman that bought a copy of Infinite Dendrogram two years after the game's release. He chooses to begin his adventure in the Kingdom of Altar, where he becomes a Paladin. During the battle of Gideon, he loses his left arm but is able to defeat both Hugo and Franklin, which significantly boosts his reputation within the game and earns him the nickname "the Unbreakable."
Nemesis (ネメシス, Nemeshisu)
Voiced by: Yūko Ōno (Japanese); Mikaela Krantz (English)
Ray's Embryo, a special kind of artificial intelligence that provides the player with information and tactical support. She transforms into Ray's weapon, a sword, and like all Embryos, she can evolve depending on Ray's progress throughout the game. During their journey to Gideon, she attains a second form, a halberd.
Shu Starling (シュウ・スターリング, Shū Sutāringu)
Voiced by: Satoshi Hino (Japanese); Chris Guerrero (English)
Ray's brother, already an experienced player of Infinite Dendrogram. He constantly wears a bear costume to hide his true identity as the King of Destruction, the player with the highest kill count in all of Altar. His Embryo is a battleship. He reveals himself during Franklin's invasion of Gideon.
Rook Holmes (ルーク・ホームズ, Rūku Hōmuzu)
Voiced by: Makoto Koichi (Japanese); Ciarán Strange (English)
A player Ray helps in a battle. He later gains the ability to tame and charm monsters. In real life, he is the son of a detective and a thief and he inherited his deductive skills from them. After his parents died in a plane crash, Rook found a letter in which his father was asked to discover the mysteries of Infinite Dendrogram.
His job class is pimp, which Rook doesn't mind much; it allows him to Tame female monsters.
Babylon (バビロン, Babiron)
Voiced by: Yūki Takada (Japanese); Dani Chambers (English)
Rook's Embryo, nicknamed "Babby" She's a succubus, but is barred from lewd things due to the child filter on Rook's system; the most she can do is give very good massages.
Hugo Lesseps (ユーゴー・レセップス, Yūgō Reseppusu)
Voiced by: Ayumu Murase (Japanese); Clifford Chapin (English)
A Master and High Driver of the Dryfe Imperium. He specializes in piloting giant robots called Magingear, which he can power up using his Embryo Cocytus. In real life, Hugo is actually a girl called Yuri Gautier and she created the Hugo character in an attempt to emulate the knights in shining armor from theater plays she enjoyed. He is member of the Triangle of Wisdom and goes along with Franklin's plan to invade Gideon, thinking it will keep casualties to a minimum and bring the Altar-Dryfe war to a quicker end. As the invasion starts, however, Rook makes him realize Franklin never had any intention of sparing the citizen and he actually wants to destroy the city and kill as many as possible, causing Hugo to betray him and instead assist the city's defenders. As Ray confronts Franklin, however, Hugo steps in to defend him, revealing that Franklin is actually his older sister, Francesa. With Franklin losing the battle of Gideon, he removes Hugo from the Triangle of Wisdom in an attempt to protect him.
Cyco (キューコ, Kyūko)
Voiced by: Yui Ogura (Japanese); Lindsay Seidel (English)
Hugo's Embryo, who keeps her true identity secret. Her real name is Cocytus and she can merge with Hugo's Magingear in order to strengthen its attacks.
Marie Adler (マリー・アドラー, Marī Adorā)
Voiced by: Yōko Hikasa (Japanese); Amber Lee Connors (English)
A journalist working for the Dendrogram Information Network. She provides Ray with information about the latest events in the world of Infinite Dendrogram. She has experience in martial arts and her Embryo, Arc-en-Ciel, is a gun. Despite having an under-leveled Embryo, she is experienced enough to defeat higher-ranking players with ease. In the real world, she used to be a manga artist who created "Marie Adler" as the main character of her manga until she hit writer's block and used Infinite Dendrogram as a way to live vicariously as Marie. She befriends Elizabeth, the second princess of Altar, and attempts to save her when Franklin kidnaps her during the invasion of Gideon.
She is the Player Killer who took out Ray, but refuses to tell him; feeling shame after becoming friends.
Liliana Grandria (リリアーナ・グランドリア, Ririāna Gurandoria)
Voiced by: Aoi Yūki (Japanese); Megan Shipman (English)
An NPC serving as Vice Commander for the army of Altar. She asks for Ray's help in looking for her sister Milianne and later assists his group while defending Gideon from Franklin's forces.
Milianne Grandria (ミリアーナ・グランドリア, Miriāna Gurandoria)
Voiced by: Natsumi Haruse (Japanese); Jad Saxton (English)
Liliana's younger sister. She gets lost in an abandoned orchard but Ray saves her.
Cheshire (チェシャ, Chesha)
Voiced by: Shiori Izawa (Japanese); Tia Ballard (English)
One of the artificial intelligences overseeing Infinite Dendrogram. He explains the basic elements of the game to Ray and explains him that Nemesis has the same functional capabilities as Cheshire and his fellow administrators.
Figaro (フィガロ)
Voiced by: Kenichi Suzumura (Japanese); Christopher Wehkamp (English)
The top duelist in Altar. Ray and Nemesis meet him while exploring Altar's underground labyrinth and he advises them to visit Gideon, the Duel City, so they can become stronger. He fights Xunyu in Gideon's fighting tournament and narrowly beats him.
Figaro is bedridden IRL due to disability, which resulting in his embryo becoming symbiotic and replacing his avatar's heart.
Xunyu (迅羽)
Voiced by: Nao Tōyama (Japanese); Rachael Messer (English)
A high-ranking player from the Huang He Empire who travels to Gideon in order to enter its fighting tournament.
Though Xunyu's avatar is a nightmarish jiangshi, she is just a mischievous girl. Her avatar's voice is so distorted, subtle emotion is hard to pick up; leaving others misinterpreting Xunyu's actions.
Elizabeth S. Altar (エリザベート・S・アルター, Erizabēto Esu Arutā)
Voiced by: Aya Uchida (Japanese); Alexis Tipton (English)
The second princess of Altar who is kidnapped and held hostage by Dr. Franklin.
Juliet (ジュリエット, Jurietto)
Voiced by: Yūki Kuwahara (Japanese); Laura Faverty (English)
A high-ranking player who partakes in Gideon's fighting tournament. She wields the Embryo Hraesvelgr.
Chelsea (チェルシー, Cherushī)
Voiced by: Maaya Uchida (Japanese); Krystal LaPorte (English)
A high-ranking player who partakes in Gideon's fighting tournament. She wields the Embryo Poseidon.
Mr. Franklin (Mr.フランクリン)
Voiced by: Yoshitsugu Matsuoka (Japanese); Ian Sinclair (English)
A scientist working for the Dryfe Imperium and leader of Dryfe's most powerful clan, the Triangle of Wisdom. His Embryo is Pandemonium, a large monster holding a monster-producing factory on its back. He initially uses a penguin suit and the "Dr. Flamingo" alias to travel across Altar without arousing suspicion, but he later reveals his true identity everyone in Gideon as he begins his plan to end the war between Altar and Dryfe. He gains an interest in Ray after watching him subvert his plans to weaken Altar, to the point he tricks Ray into drinking a potion that informs Franklin of his status and weapons and later uses that information to create a monster with the express purpose of killing Ray. As the battle of Gideon ends, Ray defeats Franklin, but not before Hugo reveals that Franklin is actually his older sister Francesa. With his forces depleted, Franklin removes Hugo from the Triangle of Wisdom, both in an attempt to protect him and to undo any moral restrains he himself may have in his goal towards beating Ray.
Mohwak X (モホークX, Mohōku X)
Voiced by: Chado Horii (Japanese); Orion Pitts (English)
He is a member of Mohwak League under the leadership of Mohwak Omega.

== Media ==
=== Light novels ===
It was originally published by Sakon Kaidō as a free-to-read web novel on Shōsetsuka ni Narō in 2015 and Hobby Japan published the first volume in print with illustrations by Taiki in November 2016. As of December 1, 2025, twenty-three volumes and one extra have been published. The light novel is licensed by J-Novel Club.

=== Manga ===
The light novel series was adapted into a manga series by Kami Imai and published by Hobby Japan, with sixteen volumes released as of August 3, 2026. The manga is also licensed by J-Novel Club.

=== Anime ===
An anime television series adaptation was announced on January 25, 2019. Tomoki Kobayashi directs the series, with NAZ producing the animation, Yūichirō Momose handling series composition, Masahiko Nakata designing the characters, and Kenji Hiramatsu composing the series' music. It aired from January 9 to April 16, 2020, on AT-X, Tokyo MX, BS11, and SUN. Aoi Yūki performs the series' opening theme song "Unbreakable", while Aya Uchida performs the series' ending theme song "Reverb". Funimation had licensed the series for a simulcast and a SimulDub. Following Sony's acquisition of Crunchyroll, the series was moved to Crunchyroll. It ran for 13 episodes.

| No. | Title (Note: All English titles are taken from Funimation.) | Original release date |
|---|---|---|
| 1 | "The Beginning of Possibility"; Transliteration: "Kanōsei no Hajimari" (Japanese: 可能性の始まり) | January 9, 2020 |
Reiji Mukudori buys a copy of Infinite Dendrogram, the world's first full virtual reality MMORPG. Upon entering the game, he is greeted by Cheshire, one of the AIs in charge of overseeing the game, who tells Reiji he must choose an online alias. Reiji chooses the name "Ray Starling". As he arrives at the Kingdom of Altar, Ray meets Liliana Grandria, an NPC who asks for his help in looking for her sister Milianne. Shu, Ray's brother, offers to help in the quest, but after finding Milianne in an abandoned orchard, they are attacked by demi-drag-worms. With Shu dragged underground and Liliana fighting elsewhere, only Ray is left to bring Milliane to safety. Fortunately, Ray awakens his Embryo, Nemesis, who manifests as a sword, and destroys the last demi-drag-worm, finishing the quest.
| 2 | "Tomb Labyrinth"; Transliteration: "Bohyō Meikyū" (Japanese: 墓標迷宮) | January 16, 2020 |
As Ray, Nemesis and Shu celebrate the completion of Ray's first quest, Shu explains some of Altar's history to Ray and helps him to become a Paladin. Later, Ray and Nemesis attempt to level up but they are ambushed by a player killer. Despite his efforts to escape, Ray is killed and has to wait 24 hours before logging into Infinite Dendrogram again. To become stronger, Ray and Nemesis go to the Tomb Labyrinth in the royal cemetery, where they fight zombies and meet Figaro, one of the top-ranking players in Altar, who recommends Ray to visit Gideon, a city where players can have duels and suffer no penalty for dying. As Figaro takes his leave, Ray and Nemesis continue their fight throughout the labyrinth, but Nemesis is left terrified by the zombies and Ray consoles her by polishing her blade.
| 3 | "Superior"; Transliteration: "Superioru" (Japanese: 超級) | January 23, 2020 |
Ray, Nemesis, Rook and Babylon discover that the player killer bands stalking the four corners of Altar have been eliminated. Marie Adler, a journalist working for the Dendrogram Information Network, confirms the story and shows the group a video depicting three of the top players in Altar, Figaro included, defeating the player killers. Marie also confirms that the player killer stalking the north, the one responsible for killing Ray, escaped and is still at large, giving Ray and Nemesis the opportunity to get even. Later, as Ray and Nemesis survey a destroyed forest, they come across Cheshire, who was running maintenance in the area and informs Ray that Maiden-type Embryos like Nemesis share the same functionality as administration AIs. With the player killers defeated, the roads across Altar are now open and Ray and his allies accept a quest to transport goods to Gideon, with Marie offering to come along. Unbeknownst to Ray and his allies, however, a giant ogre called Gardranda stalks the road to Gideon.
| 4 | "Like a Flag Flying the Reversal"; Transliteration: "Gyakuten wa hirugaeru hata no gotoku" (Japanese: 逆転は翻る旗の如く) | January 30, 2020 |
As Ray's groups sets out on their journey to Gideon, they encounter a group of goblins attacking a caravan of travelers. Ray and his allies defeat the goblins until they are ambushed by Gardranda, who spreads out poisonous gas to weaken Ray. Marie gives Ray an elixir to temporarily protect him from the poison's effects while Rook and Babylon keep Gardranda distracted. As the battle progresses, Nemesis evolves into her second form and gains the ability "Like a Flag Flying the Reversal", which allows her to reverse any status ailments affecting Ray. Despite this, Nemesis' offensive abilities are severely reduced and Ray only kills Gardranda when a bullet fired by the unidentified player kills weakens Gardranda at the last possible second. With the boss defeated and the group arriving at Gideon, the quest ends and Ray is selected as MVP. Ray also obtains two magical bracers as new weapons, but he gets himself injured while testing them out, until a stranger in a penguin suit, who calls himself "Dr. Flamingo", gives Ray a potion that does heal him but also gives him animal ears. Flamingo runs away, but not before telling Ray that he should return to normal in 10 hours. Ray and Nemesis are confused as to how does Flamingo know Ray, even though Ray never gave him his name. At the end, we see what looks like a player sitting in a dark room looking at monitor screens watching several players and commenting about Ray.
| 5 | "La Porte de I'Enfer"; Transliteration: "Jigoku mon" (Japanese: 地獄門) | February 6, 2020 |
Ray and Nemesis visit an item shop in Gideon, where Ray earns a special stallion from a gacha game machine. Unfortunately, Ray cannot ride it without earning a special amulet first. Ray attempts to earn money in order to buy the amulet, until he comes across a fellow Master called Hugo and his friend Cyco and they all get a quest from a woman, who asks them to save her brother from a child-kidnapping gang. Upon accepting the quest, Hugo reveals his weapon, a giant robot called Magingear, which he uses to take Ray to the gang's fortress, but not before telling Ray that Masters of Maiden-type Embryos, like Ray, do not consider Infinite Dendrogram to be a game, but as genuine as real life itself. While Hugo and Cyco attack the fortress' defenders head-on, Ray and Nemesis infiltrate the fortress and discover that several of the kidnapped children have been murdered and turned into undead monsters, forcing Ray to kill them in an act of mercy. Hugo is attacked by a giant boss guarding the fortress, forcing him to reveal Cyco, whose real name is Cocytus, as his Embryo and merge her with his Magingear. Hugo destroys the boss while Ray reaches the fortress' lowest dungeon and finds a child as the sole survivor, but as he tries to save him, the child awakens and attacks Ray.
| 6 | "Beyond the Radix Point"; Transliteration: "Shōsūten no Kanata" (Japanese: 小数点の彼方) | February 13, 2020 |
Ray survives the surprise attack thanks to Nemesis' halberd form and confronts the mastermind behind the kidnappings, a lich who was trying to create a powerful magical relic called the Crystal of Resentment. The lich attempts to flee but is stopped by Hugo and Ray kills him. While Ray and his allies venture deep into the castle to rescue the remaining children, the bandits had worked for the lich attempt to steal his possessions, including the Crystal. Unfortunately, the Crystal reacts to the lich's death, kills the bandits and merges with their corpses, creating a new boss. Hugo takes the children to safety while Ray confronts the boss alone. Nemesis discovers that the boss is controlled by the lingering grudges of the people that compose it and she gains extra attack power whenever the lich's grudge controls it. Unfortunately, Ray is injured in battle and Nemesis takes him to safety while going to confront the boss on her own. Ray has a dream about a mysterious girl who observes the time Shu saved him and a little girl from getting hit by a truck, but getting his foot injured in the process. Ray blamed himself for his injury but Shu told him to believe in himself and to never lose faith in whatever choice he makes. This motivates Ray to return to the fight, but not before the girl reveals herself to be the last remnant of Gardranda's mind, having acquired sentience after Ray killed her original form. Ray and Nemesis destroy the boss and acquire a pair of greaves as a reward. Later that night, Hugo and Cocytus meet up with Flamingo, who takes off his penguin suit and discusses his plan to end the war between Altar and Dryfe.
| 7 | "The Dueling Cities"; Transliteration: "Kettō Toshi" (Japanese: 決闘都市) | February 27, 2020 |
With all their major quests finished, Ray and Nemesis meet up with Marie, Rook and Babylon to have breakfast together. Marie gives them an invitation to a fighting tournament that will be held in Gideon. Later, Shu tells Ray and Nemesis that he is friends with Figaro, who will compete in the tournament. Ray goes to see Hugo in order to split up the reward for the previous quest and Hugo advises Ray to go west. As the tournament begins, Franklin calls the general of Dryfe's military and tells him of his plan to use the tournament to Dryfe's advantage. Shu gives Ray a telepathy cuff, which can be used to communicate two people across long distances. Shu also warns Figaro that he will face tough opponents in the tournament, but Figaro still intends to win.
| 8 | "Clash of the Superiors"; Transliteration: "Superioru Gekitotsu" (Japanese: 超級激突) | March 5, 2020 |
Ray is about to bet on Figaro for the tournament's next match, but Nemesis stops him, thinking he will waste their money again. They stumble upon Xunyu, who is carrying an unconscious girl. Ray thinks Xunyu is about to harm the girl and attempts to fight Xunyu, who proves to be too fast for him. Fortunately, Shu steps in and defuses the situation and the unconscious girl is actually an ambassador from the Huang He Empire and Xunyu was her bodyguard. Ray and Shu reunite with the rest of the party as the match begins, with Figaro and Xunyu set to fight each other. Xunyu is able to land several hits on Figaro, even cutting out one of his lungs, but as Shu explains, Figaro possesses a special Embryo that makes him more powerful the longer he remains in a fight. Just when it looks like Xunyu has directed a killing blow towards Figaro's heart, Shu reveals that Figaro's Embryo is inside his body and is shaped like a heart, protecting him from the attack. Figaro wins the match, but Flamingo interrupts and reveals himself to be Franklin, a scientist working for the Dryfe Imperium. He also reveals he kidnapped Elizabeth, Altar's second princess, and is keeping her hostage.
| 9 | "The Beginning of Madness"; Transliteration: "Kyōen no Hajimari" (Japanese: 狂宴の始まり) | March 12, 2020 |
Marie, having known Elizabeth right before the tournament at Gideon started, becomes determined to save her from Franklin, who reveals that he surrounded the arena with a barrier and if players attempt to break through, the monsters under Franklin's control will destroy Gideon. While Marie goes on to save Elizabeth on her own, Ray discovers that under-leveled players like himself can walk through the barrier safely, as the barrier was only meant to hold high-ranking players that could partake in the tournament's matches. Ray, Rook and other under-leveled players fight players affiliated with Dryfe. Franklin tells Elizabeth that his plan is to eliminate any players affiliated with Altar, an action that will leave Altar vulnerable in an upcoming war against Dryfe. Marie briefly saves Elizabeth and inflicts lethal damage from Franklin, but Franklin transfers all the damage he sustained to his monsters and survives. As he recaptures Elizabeth, he deduces Marie managed to kill a high-rankling player using only an under-leveled Embryo and orders his henchman Veldorbell to eliminate Marie. Meanwhile, a group of low-ranking players attempt to liberate Gideon's west gate, but Hugo kills them.
| 10 | "The Movement on the Board"; Transliteration: "Banjō no Kōbō" (Japanese: 盤上の攻防) | March 19, 2020 |
Marie, Hugo and Veldorbell remember the experiences that led to them to play Infinite Dendrogram in the first place. Veldorbell uses his ability to manipulate sound in an attempt to kill Marie, but she kills him by her revealing her Embryo, Arc-en-Ciel. Meanwhile, Franklin takes the unconscious Elizabeth outside Gideon and instructs Hugo to keep everyone, except Ray, from leaving the city. As Franklin steps outside the city, he is attacked by the Royal Guard, commanded by Liliana, but he summons a monster to decimate them. Ray and Rook reach Hugo, who agrees to let Ray confront Franklin, but not before Ray and Hugo attack each other only once. As Rook remains behind and fights Hugo, Ray reaches the city's outskirts and prepares to fight Franklin.
| 11 | "The Right Arm of the Victor"; Transliteration: "Shōrisha no Uwan" (Japanese: 勝利者の右腕) | March 26, 2020 |
As the fight between Rook and Hugo continues, Hugo uses a skill that freezes parts of Rook's body over time. Thanks to his deduction skills, however, Rook is able to understand how Hugo's skill works and merges with Babylon to fight with Hugo's Magingear evenly. The power boost allows Rook to pierce through Hugo's cockpit and incapacitate him with his charm magic. Meanwhile, Franklin tells Ray that the potion he gave him earlier actually feed Franklin information about his status, level and weapons and he used that information to create a monster with the express purpose of killing Ray. He also reveals he is the one that sent Liliana's sister, Milliane, to the monster-infested orchard, which was yet another attempt to weaken Altar. Ray tells Liliana and Sir Lindos of the Royal Guard to save their injured companions while he attacks the monster directly. Using his newest weapons, Ray is able to expose the monster's entrails and unleashes a magical attack that completely disintegrates it.
| 12 | "King of Destruction"; Transliteration: "Hakaiō" (Japanese: 破壊王) | April 2, 2020 |
Although Ray is successful in destroying Franklin's monster, he sustains severe injuries and falls unconscious. Liliana casts a healing spell that keeps Ray from dying, but she is unable to heal his left arm. Franklin reveals the monster Ray destroyed was actually the weakest monster he created for the invasion and he uses a detonator to activate a series of bombs he planted all over Altar, but the bombs fail to activate and Franklin realizes Marie has disarmed them. Rook has captured Hugo and makes him realize that Franklin never intended to end the Altar-Dryfe war with minimal casualties. Franklin summons his Embryo, Pandemonium, and sends an army of suicidal monsters to attack Gideon, but Ray awakens and takes on Franklin's monster in order to buy enough time for his allies to prepare a counterattack. With the help of Rook, Marie and a group of players, Ray is able to hold the line. Franklin realizes that, with so many players assisting Ray, Hugo must have betrayed him. Shu enters the battlefield and reveals himself to be the King of Destruction, the player with the highest kill count in all of Altar. He summons his Embryo, a battleship that decimates a significant portion of Franklin's army. Franklin realizes he has lost the battle, so he activates his final weapon.
| 13 | "Those Who Bind the Possibilities"; Transliteration: "Kanōsei wo tsunagu monotachi" (Japanese: 可能性を繋ぐ者達) | April 16, 2020 |
Franklin activates his final weapon, a large subterranean creature that will destroy Gideon's coliseum, but Fatoum, a foreign player who had infiltrated the coliseum, uses magic to move the tectonic plates around the creature, crushing it to death. Ray manages to reach Pandemonium and attempts to confront Franklin, but Hugo steps in to protect Franklin, revealing that Franklin is Hugo's elder sister. Ray sacrifices both arms to defeat both Hugo and Franklin, while Shu destroys Pandemonium and Marie rescues Elizabeth. With the battle over, Liliana heals Ray but is unable to save his left arm, leaving Ray with his right arm to continue playing the game. In the aftermath, Franklin removes Hugo from the Triangle of Wisdom, both in an attempt to protect him and to undo any moral restrains he himself may have in his goal towards beating Ray. Ray also has a rematch with Marie, having already discovered she was the one who killed him in the second episode. Later, Ray disconnects himself from the game and continues his college studies in the real world.
