= Kami Imai =

Japanese manga artist (born 1980)

- 今井神
- Born: February 8, 1980 (age 46)
- Occupation: Manga artist
- Known for: Needless

Kami Imai (今井 神, Imai Kami; February 8, 1980) is a Japanese manga artist, best known as the creator of Needless which has been adapted into a 24 episode anime television series by Madhouse.

== Works ==
- Angoromoa-chan no Chikyū Shinryaku (2004, SoftBank Creative)
- Needless (2003-2013, serialized in Ultra Jump, Shueisha)
- Katatsumuri-chan (2006-2011, serialized in Manga Time Kirara, Houbunsha)
- Shirasunamura (2006-2013, serialized in Comic Rex, Ichijinsha)
- Infinite Dendrogram (2016-ongoing, serialized in Comic Fire)
- Magaimono (2019-ongoing, serialized in Young Magazine the 3rd)
- Outside works that appear in the ARCADIA magazine.
