= List of Great Teacher Onizuka chapters =

First volume cover of the Tokyopop English edition, released on April 23, 2002

Great Teacher Onizuka is a Japanese manga series written and illustrated by Tōru Fujisawa, serialized in Kodansha's Weekly Shōnen Magazine from January 8, 1997, to February 13, 2002. Its chapters were collected in twenty-five tankōbon volumes by Kodansha and released under the "Shōnen Magazine Comics" imprint from May 16, 1997, to April 17, 2002. Kodansha republished the series in twelve bunkoban volumes from September 12, 2017, to February 14, 2018.

In North America, the manga was licensed for English release by Tokyopop in 2001. The twenty five volumes were released from April 23, 2002, to August 9, 2005. Kodansha USA republished the series digitally on February 2, 2022.

== Volumes ==
- Note: All chapters are labeled as "Lessons".

No.	Original release date	Original ISBN	English release date	English ISBN
1	May 16, 1997	978-4-06-312411-8	April 23, 2002	978-1-931514-93-4
1. "Enter Eikichi Onizuka"; 2. "On Becoming a Teacher"; 3. "Hooray for the Sensei!"; 4. "Happiness in a Six-Mat Apartment"; 5. "I Want to Be a Wolf"
2	July 17, 1997	978-4-06-312436-1	June 25, 2002	978-1-931514-96-5
6. "The Teacher, Onizuka"; 7. "The Educator's Exam"; 8. "There's a Pervert on the Bus"; 9. "The German Suplex (or Back of Steel)"; 10. "Gotta Be Rock N' Roll"; 11. "Back of Steel Seals the Deal"; 12. "Teacher Onizuka is Born"; 13. "Leap of Faith"; 14. "The National Kid"
3	September 17, 1997	978-4-06-312455-2	July 23, 2002	978-1-931514-49-1
15. "The Infamous Class Four"; 16. "Picking on the Teacher"; 17. "The Homeroom Teacher"; 18. "The Plot to Kill Onizuka"; 19. "The Big Sega Center Battle"; 20. "Mother and Me"; 21. "The Shumai of Fear"; 22. "My Beautiful White Cresta!"; 23. "Fire the Scoundrel"
4	November 17, 1997	978-4-06-312481-1	August 20, 2002	978-1-59182-028-4
24. "I Am a Student!"; 25. "The Biggest Oedipal Case in the Class"; 26. "The Kichijoji Bowling Wars"; 27. "Bay Bridge Bungee Jumping"; 28. "Disqualified!"; 29. "Those Who Can't, Teach P.E."; 30. "The Trouble with Tomoko"; 31. "Eggplants and Cucumbers"; 32. "Only a Doll to Play With"
5	January 16, 1998	978-4-06-312503-0	September 24, 2002	978-1-59182-029-1
33. "Skilled in the Art of Love"; 34. "The Audition"; 35. "A Star is Born"; 36. "Retirement Recommended"; 37. "The Springtime of His Life (a Young 51)"; 38. "He Knows!"; 39. "I Love You"; 40. "The Very First Visit"; 41. "More Beautiful Than a Butterfly"
6	April 17, 1998	978-4-06-312538-2	October 22, 2002	978-1-59182-030-7
42. "Faint, Faint, Then Faint Again"; 43. "Onizuka's IQ"; 44. "Dream of Living Together"; 45. "The Road to National Domination"; 46. "The Back Up Slave"; 47. "Lick Me ♡"; 48. "Tests, Gangsters, and School Girls"; 49. "Educational Guidance!?"; 50. "The Academy's Greatest Threat"
7	June 17, 1998	978-4-06-312559-7	November 12, 2002	978-1-59182-031-4
51. "The TV Hero"; 52. "Teacher for Life"; 53. "The Dangerous Mermaid"; 54. "Happy Little Bird"; 55. "The Innocent Mermaid"; 56. "The Devilish Mermaid"; 57. "What Wolf Girls Dream Of"; 58. "Butt Bumps, Verdicts and More…"; 59. "Games of the Dead"
8	August 17, 1998	978-4-06-312583-2	December 10, 2002	978-1-59182-032-1
60. "A Day in the Life of Saejima the Cop"; 61. "Real Tuna Sings a Tune"; 62. "For Our Beloved Teacher"; 63. "My Secret"; 64. "Extracurricular Class"; 65. "X-Pandin' da Butthole!!"; 66. "The Sad Little Girl Finally Smiles"; 67. "Last Natural Enemy"; 68. "Li'l Witches Club"
9	November 17, 1998	978-4-06-312619-8	January 7, 2003	978-1-59182-070-3
69. "The Devil's Poison Cookie"; 70. "A Woman Teacher?"; 71. "The "Take Me Away" Place"; 72. "Do You Like Pretty Moms?"; 73. "Dear Fukada ♡"; 74. "Only Big on the Outside…"; 75. "Son of a Bitch!!"; 76. "The Penalty for Peeping"; 77. "No Money!?"
10	March 17, 1999	978-4-06-312665-5	March 11, 2003	978-1-59182-106-9
78. "No Money!??"; 79. "Good-bye Note"; 80. "The Missing Persons Bicycle Squad"; 81. "The Masks Come Off"; 82. "How to Make Your Own Way"; 83. "The Long Road to Okinawa"; 84. "How to Up Your Income Ten-Fold"; 85. "A Man of Men"; 86. "To Live on Luck Alone"
11	June 17, 1999	978-4-06-312688-4	May 13, 2003	978-1-59182-135-9
87. "The Mercedes Bends"; 88. "The Musashino Kinky Club"; 89. "Rope and Nutritional Supplements"; 90. "The Stubborn Underage Hooker"; 91. "Judgement Day"; 92. "Sayonara Onizuka!"; GTO Bonus Story: Tomoko's Big Adventures: "Scene 1: Number One Idol"; "Scene 2: Manager Boogie"; "Scene 3: Manager Rule Number 1"
12	August 17, 1999	978-4-06-312727-0	June 17, 2003	978-1-59182-136-6
93. "Metamorphosis"; 94. "The Azusa Metamorph Challenge"; 95. "Making it a "Go" in Okinawa"; 96. "Making it a "Go" Back in the Rooms"; 97. "Making it a "Go" with the Sea Turtles"; GTO ~♡~: "Scene 4: Where's the Office"; "Scene 5: The Little Girl's Hair"; "Scene 6: The Little Girl's Scandal"; "Scene 7: For Tomorrow…"
13	November 17, 1999	978-4-06-312773-7	August 12, 2003	978-1-59182-137-3
98. "Making it a "Go" with the Treasure!"; 99. "Making it a "Go" with the Search Dogs"; 100. "Making the Adventure "Go""; 101. "LOVE LOVE de Go"; 102. "Just Can't Go Straight"; 103. "Re-Inventing Anko"; 104. "Moonlight Blues"; 105. "LOVE LOVE LOVE"; 106. "Great Teacher Fuyutsuki…?!"
14	January 17, 2000	978-4-06-312791-1	September 16, 2003	978-1-59182-138-0
107. "White Collar Blues"; 108. "A Day in the Life of Officer Saejima (Pt. 2)"; 109. "The Return of Techigawara"; 110. "The Girl with Blue Hair"; 111. "The Delinquents Come A-Calling"; 112. "Smash the Life Out of Him!"; 113. "Major Incontinence"; 114. "The Man Who Lost to Money"
15	April 14, 2000	978-4-06-312824-6	November 11, 2003	978-1-59182-139-7
115. "Smooth Johnny"; 116. "Cuties, Crap, and the Secret Stash"; 117. "The Girl with the Butterfly Tattoo"; 118. "One Hardcore Party"; 119. "Standing in the Dark"; 120. "The Hundred to One Shot"; 121. "Thirteen Steps to the Hanging Block"; 122. "The Hundredth Man"; 123. "Down for the Count"
16	July 17, 2000	978-4-06-312848-2	January 13, 2004	978-1-59182-140-3
124. "The Loneliest Heart in the World"; 125. "Little Lost Lambs 1"; 126. "Little Lost Lambs 2"; 127. "The Bird That Couldn't Fly"; 128. "Lonely Little Fish"; 129. "Memories That Sting"; 130. "The Cast"; 131. "Crime and Punishment 1"; 132. "Crime and Punishment 2"
17	September 14, 2000	978-4-06-312882-6	March 9, 2004	978-1-59182-141-0
133. "Tears of an Angel"; 134. "The Spite Syndrome"; 135. "Mother, Daughter and Dirty Laundry"; 136. "And a Boomerang Feels No Pain"; 137. "The Delusion Junkie"; 138. "Sayonara, Sensei"; 139. "The Value of the Greener Grass"; 140. "In My Life"; 141. "A Mid-Summer's Snow"
18	December 15, 2000	978-4-06-312914-4	May 4, 2004	978-1-59182-142-7
142. "A Shock to the System"; 143. "Born Anew"; 144. "Love in a Boxed Lunch"; 145. "The Burden of Friendship (Pt. 1)"; 146. "The Burden of Friendship (Pt. 2)"; 147. "Enter the Makoto"; 148. "Inspector Makoto"; 149. "Hello, Azusa"; 150. "Fantasy Wedding"
19	March 16, 2001	978-4-06-312947-2	July 6, 2004	978-1-59182-143-4
151. "The Locust Diaries"; 152. "The Metamorphosis"; 153. "Climbing Out of the Rut"; 154. "That Crazy Tokyo U. Rhapsody"; 155. "Heroes and Zeroes"; 156. "And Then"; 157. "One Less Thing to Worry About"
20	June 15, 2001	978-4-06-312980-9	September 14, 2004	978-1-59182-144-1
158. "My Room and the Second Semester"; 159. "The Art of Amassing Garbage"; 160. "Scoring 200 Percent"; 161. "How to Smoke Out a Shut-In"; 162. "Manhood in Full Bloom"; 163. "Brandy Love"; 164. "Strawberry Panties Forever"
21	August 10, 2001	978-4-06-313006-5	November 9, 2004	978-1-59182-455-8
165. "The Brute Club"; 166. "Tears of an Angel"; 167. "Avenging Angels"; 168. "And Angels Give Golden Nectar"; 169. "Teaching by the Book"; 170. "The Azusa Reason"; 171. "When Angels Get Spanked"; 172. "The Angel with Broken Wings"
22	November 16, 2001	978-4-06-313041-6	January 11, 2005	978-1-59532-410-8
173. "Little Boys and Little Girls"; 174. "The Angel Army"; 175. "Police Blotter: Saejima Schemes (Pt. 3)"; 176. "My Boyfriend's into Games"; 177. "Tales of Summer Nights"; 178. "And Summer Festivals"; 179. "Five Centimeters to the Other Side"; 180. "The End of Summer (Pt. 1)"; 181. "The End of Summer (Pt. 2)"
23	March 15, 2002	978-4-06-313073-7	March 8, 2005	978-1-59532-411-5
182. "Kidnap and Go!"; 183. "The Mother and Her Other"; 184. "Memories of a Terrorist"; 185. "It Happened on a Beautiful Morning"; 186. "The Shape of the Heart in the Sky"; 187. "Her Circumstances"; 188. "Friends"
24	April 17, 2002	978-4-06-313097-3	May 10, 2005	978-1-59532-412-2
189. "Heaven's Gate"; 190. "MRIs and Garter Belts"; 191. "Been Tossed Away Once Already"; 192. "An Angel's Miscalculation"; 193. "When Angels Go Bad"; 194. "Looking for Love Again Tonight"; 195. "Grieving Time"
25	April 17, 2002	978-4-06-313098-0	August 9, 2005	978-1-59532-413-9
196. "Sayonara"; 197. "Give Me Wings"; 198. "Good Luck and Goodbye"; 199. "When Angels Go Bad"; 200. "Forever"; ""We Really Eat It!" Special Supplement: Tohru Fujisawa's Way of the Comic Artist – The Explosive Crusade"
