= GTO: Paradise Lost =

Japanese manga series

- First tankōbon volume cover, featuring Eikichi Onizuka

GTO パラダイス・ロスト (Jītīō Paradaisu Rosuto)
- Manga
- Written by: Tōru Fujisawa
- Published by: Kodansha
- English publisher: NA: Kodansha USA (digital)
- Imprint: Young Magazine KC
- Magazine: Weekly Young Magazine (2014–2023); Magazine Pocket (2024) (Note: Under the title GTO: Paradise Lost Kai)
- Original run: April 14, 2014 – October 15, 2024
- Volumes: 23
- Preceded by
- Shonan Junai Gumi (1990–1996); Bad Company (1996); Great Teacher Onizuka (1997–2002); GTO: 14 Days in Shonan (2009–2011)
- icon

GTO: Paradise Lost (Japanese: GTO パラダイス・ロスト, Hepburn: Jītīō Paradaisu Rosuto) is a Japanese manga series written and illustrated by Tōru Fujisawa. It is a sequel to Fujisawa's Great Teacher Onizuka manga series. It was published in Kodansha's Weekly Young Magazine from April 2014 to February 2023, and was later transferred to the Magazine Pocket digital platform, where it ran under the title GTO: Paradise Lost Kai from April to October 2024. The GTO: The Paradise Lost chapters were initially collected in 20 tankōbon volumes, and the series was later republished under the GTO: Paradise Lost Kai title in 23 volumes.

== Plot ==
A sequel to the events of Great Teacher Onizuka, the story opens with Eikichi Onizuka serving time in prison. From his cell, Onizuka recounts the chain of events that led to his incarceration, centering on his role as assistant homeroom teacher for Class G at Holy Forest Academy, a newly established class composed of high school–aged celebrities and aspiring idols. The narrative unfolds as a framed story, with Onizuka explaining to his fellow inmates how his unorthodox teaching methods and involvement in the personal and professional scandals of his students escalated into a major incident.

As he becomes entangled in the rivalries, media pressures, and hidden agendas surrounding Class G, Onizuka confronts exploitation within the entertainment industry while attempting to guide his students through their crises. The series chronicles these escalating troubles and adventures, gradually revealing how his efforts to protect and reform his students ultimately resulted in the circumstances that landed him behind bars.

== Publication ==
Written and illustrated by Tōru Fujisawa, GTO: Paradise Lost is a sequel to his Great Teacher Onizuka manga series. The manga started in Kodansha's seinen manga magazine Weekly Young Magazine on April 14, 2014. The manga went on hiatus several times; the series's first part finished in October 2017, and Fujisawa put the manga on hiatus, attributing it to a staff shortage. In June 2021, Fujisawa stated that GTO: Paradise Lost would be the last manga in the GTO series. The last chapter in Weekly Young Magazine was released on February 14, 2023. The series resumed publication on the Magazine Pocket digital platform, under the title GTO: Paradise Lost Kai (GTO パラダイス・ロスト 改, Jītīō Paradaisu Rosuto Kai), on April 1, 2024, and finished on October 15 of the same year. An additional one-shot chapter, which serves as the finale of the manga's Saejima story arc, was published in Weekly Young Magazine on August 31, 2026.

Kodansha first collected its chapters in 20 tankōbon volumes, released from August 6, 2014, to November 4, 2022. Kodansha later started republishing the volumes, under the title GTO: Paradise Lost Kai, on July 18, 2025. The 23rd and final volume was released on June 19, 2026.

Crunchyroll published the manga digitally in English. In April 2017, Kodansha USA started publishing the volumes digitally.

=== Volumes ===
No.	Original release date	Original ISBN	English release date	English ISBN
1	August 6, 2014 (1st ed.); July 18, 2025 (Kai ed.)	978-4-06-382506-0 (1st ed.); 978-4-06-539005-4 (Kai ed.)	April 11, 2017	978-1-68233-507-9
2	March 6, 2015 (1st ed.); July 18, 2025 (Kai ed.)	978-4-06-382582-4 (1st ed.); 978-4-06-539020-7 (Kai ed.)	May 16, 2017	978-1-68233-508-6
3	August 6, 2015 (1st ed.); August 20, 2025 (Kai ed.)	978-4-06-382651-7 (1st ed.); 978-4-06-539021-4 (Kai ed.)	July 4, 2017	978-1-68233-509-3
4	April 6, 2016 (1st ed.); August 20, 2025 (Kai ed.)	978-4-06-382762-0 (1st ed.); 978-4-06-539022-1 (Kai ed.)	August 1, 2017	978-1-68233-510-9
5	June 6, 2016 (1st ed.); September 19, 2025 (Kai ed.)	978-4-06-382813-9 (1st ed.); 978-4-06-539023-8 (Kai ed.)	September 5, 2017	978-1-68233-775-2
6	September 6, 2016 (1st ed.); September 19, 2025 (Kai ed.)	978-4-06-382849-8 (1st ed.); 978-4-06-539025-2 (Kai ed.)	March 13, 2018	978-1-64212-160-5
7	December 6, 2016 (1st ed.); October 20, 2025 (Kai ed.)	978-4-06-382893-1 (1st ed.); 978-4-06-539024-5 (Kai ed.)	April 10, 2018	978-1-64212-186-5
8	March 6, 2017 (1st ed.); October 20, 2025 (Kai ed.)	978-4-06-382935-8 (1st ed.); 978-4-06-539026-9 (Kai ed.)	May 8, 2018	978-1-64212-202-2
9	June 6, 2017 (1st ed.); November 20, 2025 (Kai ed.)	978-4-06-382977-8 (1st ed.); 978-4-06-539027-6 (Kai ed.)	June 12, 2018	978-1-64212-234-3
10	September 6, 2017 (1st ed.); November 20, 2025 (Kai ed.)	978-4-06-510143-8 (1st ed.); 978-4-06-539028-3 (Kai ed.)	October 29, 2019	978-1-64659-091-9
11	January 5, 2018 (1st ed.); December 19, 2025 (Kai ed.)	978-4-06-510713-3 (1st ed.); 978-4-06-539030-6 (Kai ed.)	December 31, 2019	978-1-64659-183-1
12	November 6, 2019 (1st ed.); December 19, 2025 (Kai ed.)	978-4-06-517739-6 (1st ed.); 978-4-06-539029-0 (Kai ed.)	August 4, 2020	978-1-64659-621-8
13	July 6, 2020 (1st ed.); January 20, 2026 (Kai ed.)	978-4-06-519995-4 (1st ed.); 978-4-06-542173-4 (Kai ed.)	November 3, 2020	978-1-64659-793-2
14	October 6, 2020 (1st ed.); January 20, 2026 (Kai ed.)	978-4-06-521001-7 (1st ed.); 978-4-06-542174-1 (Kai ed.)	June 1, 2021	978-1-63699-140-5
15	February 5, 2021 (1st ed.); February 19, 2026 (Kai ed.)	978-4-06-522286-7 (1st ed.); 978-4-06-542568-8 (Kai ed.)	October 5, 2021	978-1-63699-401-7
16	July 6, 2021 (1st ed.); February 19, 2026 (Kai ed.)	978-4-06-523676-5 (1st ed.); 978-4-06-542570-1 (Kai ed.)	December 21, 2021	978-1-63699-528-1
17	November 5, 2021 (1st ed.); March 18, 2026 (Kai ed.)	978-4-06-525847-7 (1st ed.); 978-4-06-542940-2 (Kai ed.)	May 17, 2022	978-1-68491-178-3
18	March 4, 2022 (1st ed.); March 18, 2026 (Kai ed.)	978-4-06-527110-0 (1st ed.); 978-4-06-542943-3 (Kai ed.)	August 16, 2022	978-1-68491-394-7
19	July 6, 2022 (1st ed.); April 20, 2026 (Kai ed.)	978-4-06-525847-7 (1st ed.); 978-4-06-543299-0 (Kai ed.)	December 20, 2022	978-1-68491-599-6
20	November 4, 2022 (1st ed.); April 20, 2026 (Kai ed.)	978-4-06-529802-2 (1st ed.); 978-4-06-543297-6 (Kai ed.)	March 21, 2023	978-1-68491-856-0
21	May 20, 2026 (Kai ed.)	978-4-06-543578-6 (Kai ed.)	—	—
22	May 20, 2026 (Kai ed.)	978-4-06-543579-3 (Kai ed.)	—	—
23	June 19, 2026 (Kai ed.)	978-4-06-543869-5 (Kai ed.)	—	—
