= List of Great Teacher Onizuka characters =

This is a list of the major and minor characters that appear in Great Teacher Onizuka (abbreviated GTO), which is a Japanese manga series written and illustrated by Tōru Fujisawa. Also included are characters from the manga, anime, and live-action series.

== Holy Forest Academy faculty and staff ==
Eikichi Onizuka (鬼塚 英吉, Onizuka Eikichi)

- Voiced by: Wataru Takagi (Japanese); David Lucas (English)
- Japanese live-action actor: Takashi Sorimachi, Akira (2012-Remake)

A 22 year-old, hormonal, blonde-haired biker, virgin, and former bōsōzoku, Eikichi Onizuka is the protagonist of GTO. Onizuka was the protagonist of series author Tōru Fujisawa's previous series, Shonan Junai Gumi. He graduated from a bottom-rung university by cheating and, as such, cannot get a decent job. His primary way of spending time is peeping up girls' skirts at a local mall. He is very athletic, as he can bench press 150 kg (331 lbs), has a second dan black belt in karate, and claims he performs 500 push ups, 1000 pull ups and 2000 Hindu squats daily. His mode of transportation is a Kawasaki Z750RS Z2 motorcycle.

Through the events explained in the manga, Onizuka decides to become a teacher, even though it is implied he has an IQ of about 50. His initial training is in the Musashino Public High School, where he meets Nanako Mizuki. His experience taming the rowdy gangs in his assigned class hardens his convictions that teaching is the way to go, and when he learns of Mizuki's problems, he also decides to abstain from sexual experience with schoolgirls, opting to solve their personal issues for them, instead.

Unfortunately, he nearly messes up by forgetting to take the public teachers' civil service exam; as a result, no public high school will accept him, but he is still eligible for private school teaching. He manages to get a job at the upper-crust Kissho (Holy Forest) Academy, despite the objections of Vice-Principal Hiroshi Uchiyamada, whom he continues to aggravate well into his tenure. One of the conditions of having the job at Holy Forest is that he must sleep at the school - in the storage room at the top floor, with roof access - and it is here that Onizuka officially starts his career in teaching, when he stops Noboru Yoshikawa from committing suicide.

Onizuka is put in charge of class 3-4, a class so bad it has driven past teachers insane and one to death. Not only does he survive their brutal, bullying tactics, but he also befriends his students, and the backbone to the story of GTO consists of his unique experiences in turning his students around and learning lessons of his own.

Onizuka has incredible physical resilience. On more than one occasion, he has fallen from heights that would instantly kill most people and claims to have a sort of healing factor, as he healed from a broken arm in less than a day, and even endure multiple gunshot wounds. Onizuka often presents his strength in unintentionally flamboyant ways, such as arm-wrestling over 100 men of exponential strength, (sometimes 3 at once) in a row and winning. His fighting abilities are not to be taken lightly either, as Onizuka is capable of fending off multiple opponents, even if they are well-armed. However, it was revealed around chapter 190 that because of all the physical damage he sustained since he started teaching, it all resulted in a clotted blood vessel in his brain and that a jolt to his head could either turn him into a vegetable, paralyze him, or kill him.

In spite of his impressive fighting skills, Onizuka is often roughed up by his students, and others, whenever he behaves badly. It could be speculated that deep down, Onizuka knows when he's acting immature, and allows others to keep him in line. An example of this is when he forces his students to dig for buried treasure during the Okinawa trip. Urumi Kanzaki kicks Onizuka into a hole, and later forces him to wear S&M garb and has him crawl around on all fours, with Urumi riding on his back. Another example is when Vice-Principal Uchiyamada has Onizuka over for dinner and hits him on the head with a wooden bench, after finding out that he was acting lecherous with his daughter at a karaoke bar (Onizuka was playing "Where's The Nipple?").

It is shown throughout the series that Onizuka is also very lucky, as he always manages to squeeze out of tight situations. An example of this is when he must raise 8 million yen to live up to a promise he made to the 3rd year students. He received what he believed to be a winning lottery ticket but it turned out to be false. However, he was given a raffle ticket which he kept but didn't expect for it to help his predicament, but ended up winning a car worth the 8 million yen. He gave away the car in an act of kindness, and while it seemed unlikely for him to get the car back, it was returned to him in the last minute.

GTO-Shonan 14 days

In Shonan 14 Days, Onizuka revealed on a live television programme that he nearly buried one of his students for thinking that she is dead. Although he denied the claim that he did this on purpose, the crowd did not take it and Onizuka was forced to leave Tokyo for a while until the outrage subsides. He goes to Shonan, a place where he grew up. There he met Shiratori, one of Fujitsuki-chan's friends and he learns that she is a caregiver at the White Swan Youth Home which houses kids from broken homes. He tells her that he is a teacher back in Tokyo and he probably could give her a hand in managing the kids at White Swan. Shiratori invites him to stay with them and help out, and Onizuka obliges in order to help the kids in the same manner he does at school.

Onizuka mentioned a little about his dad, who left his mom when he was younger for another woman when he shows Katsuragi his secret place, a place where he goes when he is stressed out or in trouble. Katsuragi thinks that she might have misjudged him and started to think of Onizuka on a different perspective after that.

Azusa Fuyutsuki (冬月 あずさ, Fuyutsuki Azusa)

- Voiced by: Fumiko Orikasa (Japanese); Wendee Lee (English)
- Japanese live-action actor: Nanako Matsushima, Takimoto Miori (2012-Remake)

A 22 year-old female teacher, employed at the same private school as Eikichi Onizuka, Azusa Fuyutsuki is the heroine of the series. Unlike Onizuka, she led a relatively normal life, graduating from Waseda University. Her quiet manner and moderate ideas are misleading, as she proves to be very tough on her own, which scares the overconfident, zealous Onizuka. To prepare him for the test which would determine his teaching career, she makes a mountain of jelly with eyes of Maguro tuna fish as fruits and imposes an impossibly tough schedule that would have killed anyone or driven them mad. Her field of expertise is Kokugo or Japanese language (English, in the live-action). She falls in love with Onizuka, but as both are quite reluctant to admit their affections and show them in the open, they claim they are "just friends". This friendship is not something major, except under the eyes of the cunning Suguru Teshigawara, who finds it most aggravating that a woman with her qualifications would fall in love with one with such a crude background as Onizuka. She has difficulty with the female students in her class, due to all the boys having crushes on her, but brings them around fairly quickly, after Onizuka's advice. She has a younger sister named Makoto Fuyutsuki.

Ryoko Sakurai (桜井 良子, Sakurai Ryōko)

- Voiced by: Yoshiko Okamoto (Japanese); Wendee Lee (English)
- Japanese live-action actor: Yumi Shirakawa, Kuroki Hitomi (2012-Remake)

Ryoko Sakurai is the director of the Holy Forest Academy. She is a caring woman who believes that Eikichi Onizuka and his "methods" will work positively for the school, contrary to the beliefs of the faculty. The only time in the series that she did not approve of his behavior is when Onizuka endangered her grandson, Mayu Wakui, but she later admits this is due to his manipulative nature. She is also Daimon Misuzu's former teacher.

In the 1998 live-action series, she is named Akira Sakurai (桜井 あきら, Sakurai Akira) instead, and acts as the temporary principal of Holy Forest Academy while also being the chairwoman of the board, believing that Uchiyamada and Nakamaru are not yet proper "educators of educators". In the 1999 drama special, Onizuka is dispatched by chairwoman Sakurai to help her identical twin sister, Sakura Sakurai (桜井 さくら, Sakurai Sakura), the chairwoman of a girls' school. In the 2026 live-action series, she is deceased, and Onizuka finds himself imparting the advice she once imparted on him to his students, most notably, her grandson, Soma Sato.

Hiroshi Uchiyamada (内山田 ひろし, Uchiyamada Hiroshi)

- Voiced by: Yūichi Nagashima (Japanese); John Smallberries (English)
- Japanese live-action actor: Akira Nakao, Tayama Ryosei (2012-Remake)

The vice-principal at the Holy Forest Academy, and the Mr. Wilson to Eikichi Onizuka's Dennis the Menace, Hiroshi Uchiyamada is commonly seen throwing fits over two things: Onizuka the "parasite", and his beloved and frequently-totaled Toyota Cresta.

According to a self-explained biography in the manga, Uchiyamada was born and educated in a small rural town. He was discovered as a prodigy and recommended to become a teacher at the Tokyo College of Education, where he first met his wife-to-be, Ryōko. 29 years of hard work eventually earned him his current house and position at the Holy Forest Academy. His daughter is Yoshiko Uchiyamada.

Uchiyamada holds very conservative ideals on how peoples' backgrounds determine their future performance. Despite his attempts to thwart Onizuka's plans, Uchiyamada is not so much a classic villain than merely dogmatically serious about the job of teaching (at least in his mind). He is a not-quite-extreme example of the punishment an ordinary, older middle-aged, Japanese man takes from his home and workplace. He is forced to work with a young man like Onizuka, who easily breaks the rules and does things that don't make sense to him. His superior, Headmaster Ryoko Sakurai, seems to think it is fun to have a presence like Onizuka. At home, his wife, daughter, and dog openly disdain him in his often deluded imaginings, and feels that they're only satisfied with the luxuries that his work earns.

Uchiyamada eventually accepts Onizuka's views of teaching, when the latter yells at and punches Uchiyamada, when he interferes with Onizuka, trying to save Urumi Kanzaki, on the verge of death, for the sake of his job. As Onizuka takes Urumi to an ambulance, Uchiyamada contemplates on his 29 years as a teacher and realizes that he had stopped caring for his students and more for his job, and he even decides to save Onizuka from being fired. With Onizuka's help, he also reconciles with his family, though he remains viciously defensive, when Onizuka tries to make a move on his daughter.

A running gag in the manga has Onizuka constantly destroying Uchiyamada's Cresta, mostly as a side effect of rescuing students, such as falling from the top of the school building and landing on the car. Another running gag involves Uchiyamada frequently getting injured, or assaulted by accident, from an oblivious Onizuka.

Suguru Teshigawara (勅使河原 優, Teshigawara Suguru)

- Voiced by: Tōru Furuya (Japanese); Doug La Rosa (English)
- Japanese live-action actor: Kunihiko Ida, Yano Masato (2012-Remake)

Suguru Teshigawara is a ruthless, perfectionist mathematics teacher and a graduate cum laude of Tokyo University. He grew up trying to follow in the footsteps of his successful, older brother and father, the latter of whom is a high-ranking Parliament minister. He dresses very neatly and even wears a white velvet glove - his symbol of perfection.

Teshigawara is obsessed with Azusa Fuyutsuki and her dedication and relatively clean, prestigious background - far past the point of stalking. The walls of his apartment, which overlooks Azusa's, is completely covered with photos of her, and keeps tabs on her every move in her apartment, with extensive surveillance equipment. He even has a large pillow with a full-body shot of Azusa imprinted onto it. Suguru ends up having to drape white cloth all over the walls to conceal his fetish, when he tries to invite her over to his apartment.

Teshigawara absolutely loathes Eikichi Onizuka, not only because of his poor educational background, but because his students love him, and Azusa appears to love Onizuka more. As a result of his hatred, he pulls in a favor with the head of a local Parent-Teacher Association group, the mother of Hidemi Ohta, a student he tutors, whose father is a member of Japanese Parliament, eventually leading Onizuka to take a national high-school aptitude test, to prove he is capable of teaching. Sadly for Teshigawara, Onizuka places first nationally, keeping his position, much to his dismay and frustration. It is later revealed (exclusive to the manga) that his mental instability and fanatical perfectionism arose from the pressures placed on him by his father, who expected him to never fail at anything. His failures in his love life corroded his sanity which led him to kidnap Azusa and then failing that, to take over the school and declare it an independent country.

In the 1998 live-action series, he is renamed Yu Teshigawara (勅使河原 優, Teshigawara Yu), a different pronunciation of his given name.

Hajime Fukuroda (袋田 はじめ, Fukuroda Hajime)

- Voiced by: Kazuhiro Nakata (Japanese); Richard George (English)
- Japanese live-action actor: Sugi-chan (2012-Remake)

The stereotypically macho-muscular gym coach at the Holy Forest Academy, Hajime Fukuroda (more commonly known as "Moleface", due to a rather large mole on the side of his cheek) is a graduate of a prestigious physical education academy. Fukuroda admires his body and does his very best to keep it, and those of his pupils (the female ones, in particular), in tip-top shape. He even enjoys famously macho theme songs at karaoke bars with his colleagues. However, he also has a closeted sexual longing for young girls - in his case, the aforementioned female students. He also as a curious habit of doing pushups when under extreme stress.

In the 1998 live-action series, he is named Hajime Hakamata (袴田 はじめ, Hakamata Hajime) instead.

Tadashi Sakurai (桜井 ただし, Sakurai Tadashi)

- Voiced by: Katsumi Suzuki (Japanese); David Lelyveld (English)

The 42-year-old English teacher at the Holy Forest Academy, Tadashi Sakurai is not very fluent at the language he teaches. His last name was changed to Sakurada in the anime, in order to avoid confusion with Headmaster Ryoko Sakurai, with whom he shares no relation. Though he makes few appearances in the earlier volumes of the manga, he gets a more important role when Miyabi Aizawa blackmails him into embezzling the funds for the class trip.

In the manga, Miyabi uses Sakurai's fetish for looking up girls' skirts in the bathroom stalls, with a hidden camera, as blackmail, and his downfall comes at the hands of the police. In the anime, Miyabi blackmails Sakurai with pictures showing him as a cross-dresser, and he simply flees from school.

A flashback in the manga reveals he was bullied a lot during his high school years. He sent a love letter to a girl, but she didn't share Sakurai's feelings, and as a result was beaten up by his male peers for even sending the letter, in the first place. One day, while Sakurai was skipping class, hiding in the boys' washroom stalls, the same girl needed to use the boys' washroom, because the girls' washroom smelled bad. Sakurai was able to watch her, leading to his fetish.

Naoko Moritaka (森高 尚子, Moritaka Naoko)

- Nao Kenda is voiced by Kaya Matsutani in Japanese and Midge Mayes in English.
- Japanese live-action actor: Takizawa Saori (2012-Remake)

Naoko Moritaka is the eccentric, school nurse at Holy Forest Academy. Often acting as the teachers' muse, Naoko is quite helpful and knows her trade well, though she seems to derive some erotic pleasure from her regular blood donations. She's extremely attractive, and Azusa Fuyutsuki notes that she's heard "quite a few love confessions" about her from students.

In the anime, she is replaced by a former street racing queen named Nao Kadena (originally from Shonan Junai Gumi, the prequel to GTO), who took the nursing position at the Holy Forest Academy, in order to help pay for her brother's surgery - a result of him racing in her place.

Hiroshi Kochatani (小茶谷 宏, Kochatani Hiroshi)

- Voiced by: Isshin Chiba (Japanese); Ron Allen (English), and David Lucas (English)

The primary science and biology teacher, Hiroshi Kochatani is obsessed with trying to find a woman for marriage. He is nicknamed "chihuahua", because his facial features closely resembles one (even more so, after a prank by Urumi Kanzaki).

Itagake Kinoshita (Kinoshita Itagake)
Itakagake Kinoshita was originally one of Headmaster Sakurai's attendants, until he appeared to work for Misuzu Daimon, so as to help her rid the school of any useless teachers and students. However, it was Headmaster Ryoko Sakurai who ordered him to do so, as a ruse for Daimon to keep an eye on her and her actions. He was the one who gives a software CD to Takumi Ishida, a former student from Holy Forest, to shut down Daimon's network and surveillance control over the school.

Ippachi Maruyama (丸山 一八, Maruyama Ippachi)
Headmaster of Holy Forest Academy, with jurisdiction over administration, Ippachi Maruyama is nicknamed "Xavier" by Eikichi Onizuka, due to his resemblance to Francis Xavier. During the latter half of the series, he is transferred to another school but came back at the ending of the series which caused the vice-principles to loses their chance to be promoted.

Misuzu Daimon (大門 美鈴, Daimon Misuzu)

- Japanese live-action actor: Nishida Naomi (2012-Remake)

Misuzu Daimon is the new vice-principal, hired during the second semester, after Vice-Principal Ippachi Maruyama's transfer. She was placed by the board, in order to weaken the position of Headmaster Ryoko Sakurai and to force Eikichi Onizuka to leave. To that end, she deploys a school wide intranet and gives each student and faculty member a palm device. Additionally, she institutes a point system for the faculty, in an attempt to cause Onizuka's resignation and employs a special force in the school known as the "Angels", to further control the school and its faculty. One particular Angel, Sho Shibuya, regards her as a surrogate mother and the only person he has no animosity towards. She sees school as nothing more than a business, and deems personal things like friendship to be utter nonsense and unrealistic in real life, this outlook on life stems from her time in her high school, where she was always the butt of bullying and cruel verbal abuse by her classmates because of her excellent academic performance, and also due to the escalating rumors that her parents were incarcerated in prison (according to the rumors, they were both arsonists, although this was never explicitly proven). However, through it all she was able to overcome only most of the pain through her teacher at that time; Ryoko, who gave her sincere support. In a moment of weakness, she set her school on fire, and was set to die if it wasn't for Ryoko rescuing her. However, she wasn't able to remember exactly who rescued her at that time, assuming that the fire fighters were the ones responsible for that, but it would only be years later that she would find out the truth from Ryoko herself.

=== Live-action exclusive ===
Kouji Nakamaru (中丸 浩司, Nakamaru Kouji)

- Japanese live-action actor: Yoshimasa Kondo

Kouji Nakamaru is Hiroshi Uchiyamada's faithful personal assistant and the equivalent of Hiroshi Kochatani (at least in appearance) and Ippachi Maruyama (in behavior). Nakamaru is the one who receives Tomoko Nomura's "invitation" to Miyabi Aizawa's trap, though Miyabi doesn't catch him in the act. Instead, she watched Eikichi Onizuka pass by in the other direction (his envelope contained a paycheck, for sending in some photos of Azusa Fuyutsuki to a magazine) and then watched Nakamaru head into the clinic, where Tomoko was supposed to wait.

Nakamaru returns in the 2026 series, as the vice-principal of Seishin Academy. Although he came to respect Onizuka due to the events of the original series, he still holds some enmity towards Onizuka and wishes to see him fired as a teacher. Although he does act in the interests of his colleagues and students, he desires to take over the principal position from principal Ohkubo, often talking over principal Ohkubo as a means to assert his authority.

Hiroko Kotani (小谷 宏子, Kotani Hiroko)

- Japanese live-action actor: Aya Enjoji

In the anime and manga, there is a diminutive, unnamed female teacher with glasses, who often warns teachers in a sneaky manner about the troubles ahead. In the live-action, the teacher is given the name Hiroko Kotani. She is the home economics teacher, educating her female students about skills they can use around the house, such as sewing and flower arranging.

She is firmly committed to ensuring that her students become good housewives, especially Tomoko Nomura, who aggravates her, due to her constant distractions. She also berated Tomoko for sewing a duck puppet (Tomoko would use it in her audition), instead of knitting in class. She is also obsessed with finding a husband, and although she espouses dressing properly and conservatively, Onizuka and Fuyutsuki encounter her shopping at a high-end fashion outlet, at one point in the live-action.

Makoto Fujitomi (藤富 誠, Fujitomi Makoto)

- Japanese live-action actor: Baku Numata

The classic literature teacher assigned to Eikichi Onizuka's class, Makoto Fujitomi is depicted as an aging, sad, meek individual, marred by the stress of dealing with troublemaking students. In fact, Eikichi Onizuka does not meet Fujitomi on his first day of work, because the latter was taking a good amount of time off, due to stress. Fujitomi is also looked down upon by other teachers, as well as Vice-Principal Hiroshi Uchiyamada, for failing to deal with his students. He had been demoralized enough that he was tendering his resignation, and Azusa Fuyutsuki was told to collect donations for his retirement party.

However, Noboru Yoshikawa's bravery and some counseling from Onizuka convinced him to withdraw his resignation and gave him the confidence to keep teaching, though he is still regarded lowly by most other teachers. During a summer break pool party for students (held at the school pool by Onizuka), Fujitomi could be seen playing go with his students and socializing.

== Holy Forest Academy students ==
=== Class 3–4 ===
Noboru Yoshikawa (吉川 昇, Yoshikawa Noboru)

- Voiced by: Kōsuke Okano (Japanese); Ron Allen (English)
- Japanese live-action actor: Shun Oguri, Nakagawa Taishi (2012-Remake)

Noboru Yoshikawa is a student at the Holy Forest Academy, and did not have a good time before Eikichi Onizuka arrived, being the victim of bullying, mostly from Anko Uehara and her group (Miyabi Aizawa replaces Anko's role in the live-action on GTO 1998 Series). He is extremely good with video games and is somewhat of an otaku, but proves to be quite handy with making things. He also has an eye for girls and pays a lot of attention to them, as seen when Aizawa's plan to charge Onizuka with embezzlement when the group tries to identify the girls Aizawa paid to follow her plan.

Anko's bullying is so bad it included bruises over most of his body as well as writing made with permanent marker around his private parts, it makes Noboru attempt suicide twice, both times by leaping off the roof of the school, and both times resulting in him being saved by Onizuka, at the cost of Vice-Principal Hiroshi Uchiyamada's car (note that only the second attempt was caused by Anko's gang in the manga version; Noboru mentions some thugs in Class 2 as the cause of his first attempt). The two strike a quick friendship, which works for Onizuka, as Noboru has plenty of items that he wants to "borrow". His loyalty to Onizuka is by far the strongest, seen when he willingly sells his game collection to help cover Onizuka's debt.

While on the school trip to Okinawa, he gets room assigned with Anko and her friends by Onizuka. In retaliation for Onizuka and Noboru's antics, he gets tied up and led away into the dense jungle by the girls, but they all end up getting lost and rely on him for help. Despite the abuse, he saves Anko's life after she falls off a cliff, getting separated from the others. As the rest of the events of the manga unfolds, Noboru begins to enjoy Anko's company enough that she begins to feel affectionate to him.

In the 1998 live-action series, Yoshikawa (Yoshikawa Noboru (吉川 のぼる), with kana instead of kanji given name) is portrayed similarly. In the 2024 revival special, Yoshikawa is a school guidance counselor, having chosen to follow in Onizuka's footsteps, and was helping with Kenji's mental health issues when he asks Onizuka to become a substitute teacher in Kenji's place.

Anko Uehara (上原 杏子, Uehara Anko)

- Voiced by: Akemi Okamura (Japanese); Midge Mayes (English)
- Japanese live-action actor: Yua Shinkawa (2012-Remake)

Anko Uehara is an athletic girl with well-off parents who, like Kunio Murai, Miyabi Aizawa and Ruruka Hikita, has her own trio, in which she is accompanied by Naoko Asano and Mayuko Izumi.

Anko is one of the first of the class to start trouble for Eikichi Onizuka, due to her and her friends' constant mistreatment of Noboru Yoshikawa. After the most recent assault on Noboru Yoshikawa leaving him severely beaten and humiliated yet again do they get taught a lesson by Onizuka, who literally spanks them at a karaoke bar and takes pictures of himself committing the act. Afterwards, Anko gets her mother, the president of the local Parent-Teacher Association, who believes her daughter is incapable of wrongdoing, to get Onizuka fired. This backfires, with the help of Noboru and Yoshito Kikuchi, who reveal her cruel, bullying nature in front of the student body and PTA. Anko tearfully confronts her mother about their relationship and perfectionist expectations of her, which leads to some family reconciliation and doesn't get any serious retribution from what she and her friends had done.

She and her friends keep their distance from any other attempts by students to get Onizuka fired, despite giving their verbal support. While still cold to Onizuka, Anko allies with him, after being fed up with Miyabi Aizawa's manipulation of others for her own gain. When Onizuka is framed for embezzling funds for the school trip, she offers her credit card for use, but he flat-out refuses.

On the school field trip to Okinawa, her mean streak towards Noboru continues to persist, even escalating, as he and Onizuka start playing pranks of their own against her and her friends. In an ironic twist, Noboru saves her life, after her own prank fails. During a near-death experience, a flashback reveals her bullying stems from growing up with an abusive, older brother, who in turn, was abused by their father.

Shortly after, she develops feelings for him, and unsuccessfully tries to deny them. It takes an Onizuka scheme to get her to admit it.

Kunio Murai (村井 國男, Murai Kunio)

- Voiced by: Tomokazu Seki (Japanese); Rafael Antonio Oliver (English)
- Japanese live-action actor: Hiroyuki Ikeuchi, Morimoto Shintaro (2012-Remake)

The class "jock bully", Kunio Murai is not very bright and loses his temper easily. When Eikichi Onizuka arrives at the Holy Forest Academy, Kunio and his gang (consisting of Kouji Fujiyoshi and Tadaaki Kusano) attempt to kill him several times with seemingly innocent pranks, such as a cockroach planted in his school lunch. The plans backfire (such as Kunio eating the cockroach, instead) and he goes insane, nearly ending up with his face impaled on a pair of razor-sharp scissors. Onizuka then takes advantage of Kunio's 27-year-old mother, Julia Murai, after trouncing Kunio at several arcade games. It is later revealed that Julia was carrying her son at the age of 13, and her parents and boyfriend abandoned her, making Kunio overprotective of his mother.

Kunio and his gang befriend Onizuka (inadvertently becoming his "partners in crime" whenever he is up to his antics), after he saves them from a group of ruffians, but not before Onizuka joins the ruffians and has Kunio bungee-jump off the Tokyo Bay Bridge. Kunio still gets very angry when Onizuka tries to make a pass at his mother, especially with the possibility that Onizuka may very well be his new stepfather. His fear of a new father also rears its head when he suspects his mother may be marrying a man who resembles Dr. Elefun from Astro Boy.

In the 1998 live-action series, Kunio (Kunio Murai (村井 国雄, Murai Kunio), with different kanji in the given name) is the son of a biker that Onizuka and Saejima admired, though the fact that he died shortly after Kunio was born made him resent his deceased father. Out of respect, he is one of the few students Onizuka refers to by his surname. In both the 2024 revival special and the 2026 live-action series, Kunio is a restauranteur, operating a restaurant named TSUBASA, named after his mother. In the 2024 revival special, it is an izakaya, while in the 2026 series it specializes in fusion cuisine.

Kouji Fujiyoshi (藤吉 晃二, Fujiyoshi Kōji)

- Voiced by: Junichi Suwabe (Japanese); David Lucas (English)
- Japanese live-action actor: Yuki Yamada (2012-Remake)

Kouji Fujiyoshi is part of Kunio Murai's gang, usually tagging along with him and Tadaaki Kusano. He was an unwitting part of Miyabi Aizawa and Tadashi Sakurai's plan to get rid of Eikichi Onizuka, by making him collect money for the annual school trip and then lose it. The money was planted into Onizuka's jacket, which he quickly spent in one night, thus leading to Onizuka being charged with embezzlement. Feeling responsible because he had also stolen some of the money to buy a new watch, Fujiyoshi worked dropped out temporarily to earn the money back, and his actions helped lead to a school trip to Okinawa, courtesy of Onizuka.

He is also romantically interested in Miyabi, to the point of hijacking a car to get her to take a ride with him.

Tadaaki Kusano (草野 忠明, Kusano Tadaaki)

- Voiced by: Tomoki Yanagi (Japanese); Brad Rowen (English)
- Japanese live-action actor: Suzuki Nobuyuki (2012-Remake)

Tadaaki Kusano is part of Kunio Murai's gang, usually tagging along with him and Kouji Fujiyoshi. He doesn't do much, except help Murai with his mischief. He is quite attracted to Ai Tokiwa, to the point of obsession, even stealing her socks. Unfortunately, Daimon Misuzu's Angels used this to their advantage, and accuse him of also stealing her urine sample. His mother, in stark contrast to Murai's mother, is a rather portly woman that he seems quite ashamed of.

Tomoko Nomura (野村 朋子, Nomura Tomoko)

- Voiced by: Ayako Kawasumi (Japanese); Debra Cunningham (English)
- Japanese live-action actor: Miki Kuroda, Miyazaki Karen (2012-Remake)

A student in Eikichi Onizuka's class, Tomoko Nomura has a large chest (her cup size is F), but is not too bright, leading to people calling her Toro-ko (Toro meaning "slow" in Japanese; she is nicknamed Slo-mo-ko in the English version). After initially messing up her role in one of Miyabi Aizawa's plans to get Onizuka fired, she is cut off from Miyabi's group. Seeing her rather slow, clumsy nature, Onizuka enters her into a local beauty contest. He even arranges two porn producer friends to dress her up for the competition. Rather than read the given script for the acting category, Onizuka gives her a couple of action figures and she ends up doing an excellent improvised piece (with Vice-Principal Uchiyamada getting an accidental role). In the anime, Onizuka throws a cellphone on stage and she leaves a sentimental message on Miyabi's answering machine instead. She doesn't win, but she gets noticed by several television producers and begins starring in various commercials. Her young male manager, impressed with her natural beauty, and after falling in love at first sight, makes it his lifetime goal to help her succeed.

She was friends with Urumi Kanzaki since childhood, and their close bond likely arose out of their opposite personalities (Tomoko is clumsy and rather docile with a heart of gold, compared to Urumi's intellect and potential to be savagely cruel).

A side-story in the manga features Tomoko and her manager, also called GTO, only it stands for Great Tomoko Oppai (Oppai meaning breasts). In it, Tomoko's manager embarks on one very madcap adventure to save her from her dubious producers.

Miyabi Aizawa (相沢 雅, Aizawa Miyabi)

- Voiced by: Junko Noda (Japanese); Wendee Lee (English)
- Japanese live-action actor: Aimi Nakamura, Kawaguchi Haruna (2012-Remake)

Miyabi Aizawa is another student in Eikichi Onizuka's class and hates all teachers severely. She is easily the most popular girl in school, though her queen-like manner can irritate anyone. At the beginning, she appears to be the ringleader of the classmates that want to get rid of Onizuka. Like Anko Uehara and Kunio Murai, she has her own crime trio, with Saeko Ijima and Chikako Shirai. She also used Tomoko Nomura for a blackmail trap against Onizuka, but the attempt is foiled and she expels her from the group, putting the blame solely on Tomoko. Originally just out to be rid of Onizuka on principle, she quickly makes it personal, when she loses to the Onizuka-sponsored Tomoko at a beauty contest.

Miyabi is also behind the school trip funds embezzlement, where she blackmails Tadashi Sakurai into asking parents to submit the money in cash, and has Sakurai put Kouji Fujiyoshi in charge of collecting it. This allows her to steal the money from Fujiyoshi by cunningly playing on his family's tight financial situation, then planting it on Onizuka, who manages to lose it all in a step up, involving a faux female student hostess club and drugged drinks. However, Urumi Kanzaki, wanting to aid Onizuka in paying off the debt, cruelly sets her and her two friends up with an S&M group, where she is narrowly saved from being raped, when Onizuka crashes into their room of their hotel through the window after swinging from a rope, suspended by a blimp, all the way from another skyscraper. Of course, before he could actually save them, he demanded a sincere apology from Miyabi (in the anime, Urumi hires a group of yakuza, instead).

Urumi later insults Miyabi at a carnival, leading her to reveal Urumi's secret. Urumi retaliates by posting a website where it claims to post pictures of Miyabi in the bathroom taken with a hidden camera. Miyabi attempts to commit suicide by overdosing on sleeping pills, but survives. The website is revealed to be a ruse.

Miyabi was the one who led class 2-4 (as they were known then) onto the path of terrorizing teachers (previously, it was only Urumi who would occasionally do the terrorizing). Her motives behind this, however, varies between the manga and the anime.

In the anime, Miyabi was a model student, who turns this way due to a teacher who indirectly caused one of her closest friends to commit suicide, over an illicit affair between them. This, compounded by her family problems, became the root cause of Miyabi's mistrust (and often outright hate) for all adults. Her personal convictions are shattered, when she was accused of attempting to murder the aforementioned teacher, as well as assaulting a member of the Japanese Board of Education (who she sees as taking only the teacher's side). She is shocked when Onizuka takes the fall for her, by announcing he committed all of the crimes she was accused of. Arriving in time to see Onizuka being led away in handcuffs, Miyabi finally asks Onizuka to forgive her for everything she had done. One would assume that this event has restored in Miyabi the capacity to trust in adults again.

In the manga, Miyabi had a crush on their former, homeroom teacher, Ōgi, and started to believe that her feelings may be reciprocated, when he invites her to dinner. However, Ōgi already had a fiancé, whom he wanted to introduce to Miyabi. Crushed, she takes illicit photographs of herself (knowing that his hobby was photography) and tells the class that he took advantage of her. Things go out of hand when fellow classmate, Takumi Ishida, takes matters into his own hands and assaults Ōgi. Distraught over the events (Ōgi and Takumi were fired and expelled, respectively), Miyabi decides to turn the class against all teachers, thus beginning class 2-4's rebellion.

Miyabi's guilt, as well as her deteriorating family situation, makes her colder and distant to friends and classmates, leading to the events in the carnival and her rivalry with Urumi, mentally breaking her down. Her guilt is further compounded when she discovers just how much her friends still care for her. Things take a turn for the worse when she returns to her already broken family, forcing Onizuka to intervene, which results in him and a few students holding Miyabi "hostage", on the condition that her father demonstrates his love for her. The plot works, but this doesn't please Misuzu Daimon and her Angels, who then expose Miyabi's secret, forcing her to attempt a suicide from the school roof, but before that happens, Takumi, who had flown in from Okinawa, appears on the roof, to try to convincing her not to jump, despite the guilt she feels for all she's done. However, Onizuka accidentally bumps her off the ledge. Miyabi, not willing to end her life, after having settled her guilt, calls out to him, who leaps after her, landing on Uchiyamada's Cresta.

In the 1998 live-action series, Miyabi (Aizawa Miyabi (相沢 みやび), with kana instead of kanji given name) also briefly dates Murai. She is referenced, but does not appear, in the 2026 live-action series, in reference to their brief romance.

Urumi Kanzaki (神崎 麗美, Kanzaki Urumi)

- Voiced by: Kotono Mitsuishi (Japanese); Michelle Ruff (English)
- Japanese live-action actor: Honda Tsubasa (2012-Remake)

The antithesis to the "dumb blonde" stereotype, Urumi Kanzaki is a prodigy, with an IQ over 200. She is also a heterochromatic, possessing different colored eyes: one brown and one blue. However, she is psychologically disturbed, having her fair share of hate toward teachers. Her genius is displayed repeatedly by such abstract actions as the detonation of time bombs (i.e. firecrackers in disposable boxes) and making a harmless snake look like a cobra using paper cutouts. Her intellect is also shown through actions, such as shouting curse words in French and being able to speak fluent Mandarin. On the trip in Okinawa, Yoshito Kikuchi noted that she can speak 5 languages, but ironically, she doesn't understand what her Gundam otaku roommates say.

Her hatred for teachers stems from her time in elementary school. Urumi's teacher, Ms. Fujimori, while initially welcoming and receptive, wasn't able to handle her intellect properly, since she went to a second-rate college, and it was her first year teaching. Urumi's constant requests for the teacher's time, both inside and outside of school, as well as the fact that the lessons she wanted to learn from the teacher included extremely advanced, college-level subjects (such as differential calculus) eventually made the teacher snap. When Urumi interrupted Ms. Fujimori's lecture to correct her in front of the whole class, the teacher then told Urumi's secret to her class. While it isn't stated explicitly, it can be deduced that her intelligence is derived from her biological father, when Urumi tells Eikichi Onizuka that her mother had selected a sperm-donor, based on his intellect and nothing more. It is even suggested that her mother took the sperm from an American scientific genius (this information can be gleaned from a scene where Urumi and her mother visited some friends in the United States, and Urumi was led into a dark storage room by a doctor, who explains to her that her father is actually just a bottle of donated sperm); this also explains Urumi's natural, blond hair. Naturally, this caused a great deal of psychological trauma to Urumi, and quite an understandable hatred of teachers. It is still unclear what happened to Ms. Fujimori, as her last appearances in the storyline was begging Onizuka to help Urumi before something terrible happens to her.

She is later found by Miyabi in a small apartment, and hired to torture Onizuka. Formerly a student at Holy Forest for a while, but stopped attending regularly after some time, she begins almost immediately, as she frames him for lechery and sends him to jail overnight, only to appear in class and on his homeroom roster the morning after. Onizuka's frustration with her vastly increases, when Vice-Principal Uchiyamada strictly advises him that he cannot inflict physical harm on her due, to her educational potential. Urumi is eventually able to turn Onizuka into her slave (more-or-less, her "genie") by threatening to have him arrested, after she fakes her death when he accidentally pushes her off a building.

However, all this changes when she encounters her Ms. Fujimori again, awakening her deepest hatred and causing her to direct her wrath at the student body. Onizuka responds by bringing his biker gang to school and "kidnaps" her from class. He is finally able to get through to her by almost killing the two of them by jumping over - and nearly falling into - a gap at a suspension bridge, despite her attempts to convince him that she is not afraid of anything, including death. Onizuka makes her see past her trauma, however bad, just isn't worth messing up the present with (in the manga, he does this by having his biker friends share their life experiences with her). Inspired, she allies with Onizuka, and helps with his troubles.

Despite her switch in allegiance, Urumi continues her feud with Miyabi, until Miyabi reveals her origins to the student body. Urumi retaliates by setting up a web page, where she promises to post pictures of Miyabi in her bathroom (Urumi had earlier placed a hidden camera), after a countdown timer reaches zero. However, the site reveals only a single photograph of Urumi, Miyabi, and Tomoko Nomura during their younger years. Urumi never had any intention of ruining Miyabi; she just wanted to scare her. Urumi attempts suicide at an indoor skiing arena by freezing to death, but Onizuka rescues her. It is after this incident that Urumi considers Onizuka to be her "favorite".

She grows extremely infatuated with Onizuka, to the point of wanting to elope with Onizuka. Urumi takes a more stereotypical role of a character that prefers the use of violence, in response to jealousy - she is often seen beating Onizuka mercilessly every time he tries to fulfill his pervertedness. Urumi states Onizuka should wait for her hormones to start kicking in, because she's sure that she would have a bouncing body by then. Like Noboru Yoshikawa, her loyalty to Onizuka is extremely strong, to the point that she would consider suicide, if he were to die, feeling that her own life is worthless without him around.

Yoshito Kikuchi (菊地 善人, Kikuchi Yoshito)

- Voiced by: Hikaru Midorikawa (Japanese); Ron Allen (English)
- Japanese live-action actor: Yōsuke Kubozuka, Takada Sho (2012-Remake)

Yoshito Kikuchi is one of Eikichi Onizuka's students. This computer prodigy (scoring the highest without certain "aid" in the country, on a standardized test) serves as class president and is also notorious for making pornographic composite photos, during Onizuka's arrival at the Holy Forest Academy. He tries to blackmail him into resignation with several pictures posted all across the school for everyone to see. Onizuka catches Kikuchi and instead of punishing him, hires him to make composite pictures of Azusa Fuyutsuki and other female teachers, much to his surprise.

Kikuchi is eventually the second person to befriend Onizuka, and later helps Noboru Yoshikawa prevent Anko Uehara's mother, the president of the local Parent-Teacher Association, from getting Onizuka fired. Kikuchi is an amateur martial artist, having prior experience in judo and other techniques learned from Mayu Wakui (in the live-action, he claims he only knows it, and does not demonstrate this claim). It is revealed after the examinations that he was the one who switched Onizuka's test papers for a perfect score. When questioned about the actual results that Onizuka has, Kikuchi calculates it himself, and is thoroughly surprised at the score (it is unknown whether Onizuka actually did score perfect, or a score befitting his intelligence), and asks him directly, to which his teacher replies that he definitely received a perfect score.

In the manga, a possible relationship is hinted between him and Ai Tokiwa, after some intervention and a forced embrace from Onizuka.

In the 1998 live-action series, Kikuchi (Kikuchi Yoshito (菊池善人), with different kanji for the surname) has a long distance relationship with Tomoko Nomura. In the 2024 revival special, he is an administrator at MEXT, and presents an opportunity for Onizuka to resume his teaching career.

Mayu Wakui (和久井 繭, Wakui Mayu)

- Japanese live-action actor: Shono Hayama (2012-SP Episode)

The grandson of Headmaster Sakurai, Mayu Wakui attended Holy Forest Academy, until the incident involving Miyabi Aizawa and Ōgi left their class scarred and traumatized. Continuing with Miyabi's scheming to get rid of Eikichi Onizuka, she calls on Mayu's aid to return to Holy Forest and get him removed. This handsome, mischievous, unprecedented young man accepts and immediately rubs Onizuka the wrong way, which forces Sakurai to chastise his actions. Vice-Principal Hiroshi Uchiyamada takes the opportunity to suspend Onizuka, but the decision is overturned, when Sakurai, who knows her grandson needs to cease his self-destruction, begs Onizuka to try to bring him back onto the straight path.

After unsuccessful attempts to have Onizuka out of the picture, Onizuka decides to settle their feud with a 100-man arm-wrestling match. Onizuka comes out undefeated, with Mayu left as his one hundredth opponent. Already physically and mentally unstable, he collapses. At the hospital, it is revealed he has been taking tryptophan, an emotional stabilizer, to treat his anxiety issues, but exactly what is the cause behind his condition is never revealed (there are several allusions where he speaks with Yoshito Kikuchi on the subject of dying young). There is also the suggestion that his instability is due to some familial or societal factor, when he explains that with enough finances from becoming a teen idol (he is in the same agency as Tomoko Nomura), he can expose those that have harmed him publicly. Additionally, a cover-up involving Mayu may explain his ready access to large sums of money, although he already comes from a wealthy background.

Seeing how Onizuka has proved his worth, Mayu relents and stops his pranking, stating that he's glad to have met Onizuka, but it would have been better if he had known his teacher sooner. Although Mayu does not return to class, he occasionally shows up to assist Onizuka, whenever it appears the odds are against him, in terms of manpower.

Yūki Miyamori (宮森 勇気, Miyamori Yūki)

- Japanese live-action actor: Utsumi Akiyoshi (2012-Remake)

Enrolled in Eikichi Onizuka's class, but never shows up, Yūki Miyamori is the son of the head of the local yakuza. When his "friends" did not show up for his mother's funeral (he claims they were only "friends", because of his father's status as a yakuza member), he became withdrawn and isolated, displaying symptoms of hikikomori. Onizuka only knew of his existence when he tried to get some high points in the point system, set up by Misuzu Daimon. One of the criteria to get more than 100 points is to persuade a student who has not attended class for over a year to return, thus, Onizuka sets out to bring Yūki back.

Despite his family background, he is an ordinary boy who likes to play video games and would sneak out every 15th and 20th of each month in order to buy timetables for the bullet train. Onizuka and Noboru Yoshikawa manages to talk him out of his seclusion, saving Onizuka's salary in the process. He strikes a quick friendship with Noboru, when he returns to Holy Forest, and becomes somewhat of a defender of the weak, mostly via namedropping of his father's profession to frighten the school bullies.

Ai Tokiwa (常盤 愛, Tokiwa Ai)

- Japanese live-action actor: Nozomi Bando (2012-Remake)

A transfer student to Eikichi Onizuka's class during the second semester and one of Misuzu Daimon's "Angels", Ai Tokiwa is adept at Tae Kwon Do, and holds an extreme grudge towards men, willing injuring them, no matter who it is. When Yoshito Kikuchi sees pass her innocent persona, Ai knocks him out cold, with the notion that he should inform Onizuka of what she's doing. After incurring the wrath of several high school students, they enter Holy Forest to confront Ai, with the intention of beating her to a pulp. Onizuka, with some help from Mayu Wakui and his friends, evens out the odds, while Onizuka heads to settle her personal demons.

Ai reveals that prior to joining the Angels, she was gang raped by her ex-boyfriend and his buddies. Feeling insecure around any boy, Daimon recruited her into the Angels, allowing her to inforce her vengeance back at men. Onizuka sees through this façade - Ai is but a simple, frightened little girl, who only uses violence to deal, rather than cry it out. Realizing the truth, she breaks down and heavily cries. To make things up to her, Onizuka forces an embrace between her and Kikuchi, and though the two don't share mutual feelings for one another, it is hinted through the rest of the manga there is some form of affection and care between them. Ai summarily drops out of the Angels, and her allegiance with Daimon.

Sho Shibuya (渋谷 翔, Shibuya Shō)

- Japanese live-action actor: Shūhei Nomura (2012-Remake)

Sho Shibuya is a transfer student to Eikichi Onizuka's class and the leader of Misuzu Daimon's "Angels". In his former school, he was bullied to the point of insanity, reinforced with a flashback where he is stripped down to his underwear, with his classmates and even his teacher writing obscenities and symbols on his body with permanent markers. His own parents even thought of institutionalizing him, but instead, gave total guardianship over to Daimon. For this reason, he has a severe fear of parental abandonment, and keeps a tight, obedient relationship with Daimon (it is implied in another flashback that he was sexually abused by his mother, leading to a murder-suicide attempt that brought Daimon into his life as his counselor, before claiming guardianship status).

Sho fakes a friendship with Noboru Yoshikawa and institutes the plan to unveil Miyabi Aizawa's incident with Ōgi to the entire student body. Unfortunately, the plan backfires, no thanks to Onizuka, and Sho, having had enough of his interfering with Daimon, goes out to kill Onizuka. Though he successfully puts Onizuka in critical condition, Daimon sees Sho too out-of-control, and denies any involvement in his doings. Feeling abandoned again, he sets out to totally destroy Holy Forest.

Ruruka Hikita (引田 留々香, Hikita Ruruka)
A side-character from the manga, who appears in a brief story arc, Ruruka Hikita, like Anko Uehara and Miyabi Aizawa, is the head of her own trio, with two other girls, Madoka and Miko. In a parallel to the American television series, Charmed, the trio are heavily superstitious in magic and charms, though mainly out of fandom as magic does not exist in GTO. Over the course of her story arc, she attempts to get Itō, the class soccer star, to fall in love with her, but her plans backfire, leaving her in fear, if not, paranoid, that Eikichi Onizuka is sexually attracted to her. The three subsequently dedicate themselves to using black magic to destroy him (he is barely aware of her existence outside of their little "encounters").

Gundam Otaku (Gunji Mishima (三島 軍人, Mishima Gunji), Haruo Tokida (時田 晴男, Tokida Haruo), and Mokuba Shirai (白井 木馬, Shirai Mokuba)

Gunji Mishima, Haruo Tokida and Mokuba Shirai are Class 3-4's resident Gundam otakus. During the trip to Okinawa, they ended up rooming with Urumi Kanzaki, who proceed to call her "Sayla", after the character from the original Mobile Suit Gundam, since Urumi has natural blonde hair. They even cosplay as various Gundams, when Onizuka has the class take a walk through an abandoned apartment.

Takumi Ishida (石田 拓海, Ishida Takumi)

- Japanese live-action actor: Sano Gaku (2012-Remake)

A former student of Class 2-4, Takumi Ishida was expelled from Holy Forest after assaulting their homeroom teacher, Ōgi, with a baseball bat, when Miyabi Aizawa claimed accusations of rape. Although Ōgi revealed what really had happened, Takumi, feeling too guilty for his actions, retreated to Okinawa. However, he still kept in touch with Yoshito Kikuchi, using the pseudonym, Sunakujira (Sand Whale, in the English translations), and assists him throughout the series (Kikuchi did not know Takumi was Sunakujira). When Miyabi reveals the rape incident was a lie and attempts to set things right through suicide, Takumi returns to Holy Forest to convince her not to do it.

He assists Itagake Kinoshita, when he is handed a CD program to shut down Misuzu Daimon's network and surveillance control over the school. Takumi questions Itagake's motives behind this, since he was working for Daimon, but shrugs it off, realizing these events mean next to nothing to him.

==== Live-Action exclusive ====
Masaru Watanabe (渡辺 マサル, Watanabe Masaru)

- Japanese live-action actor: Yuta Yamazaki

Masaru is one of the first students to befriend Onizuka, originally trying to frame Onizuka alongside Nanako and Kenji but failing. In the 2024 revival special, he works alongside Murai at the latter's izakaya restaurant, TSUBASA, and intervenes when one of Onizuka's students, Rin Endo, tries to raise money in a compensated dating scheme. In the 2026 live-action series, he recommends Onizuka take up a new job at Seishin Academy, where his daughter, Kotone Wakatsuki, attends.

Kenji Yoda (依田 ケンジ, Yoda Kenji)

- Japanese live-action actor: Hidenori Tokuyama

Kenji is one of the first students to befriend Onizuka. In the 2024 revival special, he works as a physical education teacher at Aitoku Academy, but is hospitalized due to an accident, causing Onizuka to take his place as a temporary substitute teacher.

=== Other students ===
Aoi Fukada (深田 葵, Fukada Aoi)
One of the more popular and attractive girls at Holy Forest, Aoi Fukada is a girl Kunio Murai secretly has a crush on. Prior to Eikichi Onizuka's arrival, during a rainy afternoon, Murai was at a bus stop, with only his schoolbag to keep himself dry, until Aoi came along and shared her umbrella with him; he was instantly smitten. When he finds a love letter addressed to him, Murai believes Aoi is the one who sent it.

Kumiko Fukada (鱶田 久美子, Fukada Kumiko)
Kumiko Fukada's family name is pronounced the same way as Aoi Fukada's, which leads to multiple situations where Kunio Murai gets confused, when one of their names are mentioned. A small, shy girl with an outstretched face and gaping jaw, she has a crush on the tough and hardened Murai, who requests the help of Fuyumi Kujirakawa to deliver a love letter to him. Murai eventually takes her out on a date, much to his horror when he finally meets Kumiko in person. The 'fu ka' characters in her surname are different and, when put together, create the Japanese word for 'shark,' which is a play on her appearance.

Fuyumi Kujirakawa (鯨川 冬美, Kujirakawa Fuyumi)

- Voiced by: Takako Honda (Japanese); Cindy Robinson (English)

A member of the girls basketball team and manga club, Fuyumi Kujirakawa is notably tall for a girl her age, and much to her displeasure, since boys tend to prefer girls who are smaller in height than themselves. When Kunio Murai receives a love letter, with the name of the sender written out, except for the kanji "冬" ("Fu", in the English version), he believes it is Aoi Fukada, but Kōji Fujiyoshi and Tadaaki Kusano states it could also be Fuyumi herself. Although the sender was Kumiko Fukada, Fuyumi does carry some affection for Murai, but is afraid to tell him, due to their difference in height. Murai also states he finds it too unnatural and weird to be with her.

In the anime, more attention is given to the connection between Murai and Kujirakawa- a flashback where a Murai (with black hair) stops a pair of boys from teasing her about her height further highlights this. Near the end of the episode, in a moment of clarity, Murai attempts to stop Kujirakawa from leaving- only to stumble and fall as she watches from the bus she is on. While it's implied that he realizes that there is something between them, but it isn't further explored.

== Friends of Onizuka ==
Ryuji Danma (弾間 龍二, Danma Ryūji)

- Voiced by: Isshin Chiba (Japanese); Ron Allen (English)
- Japanese live-action actor: Shirota Yu (2012-Remake)

Ryuji Danma' is Eikichi Onizuka's drinking buddy and partner during their days known as the "Onibaku" in Shonan Junai Gumi that GTO is a sequel of. In the years since he went "straight", Ryuji has set up his own used motorcycle shop and profits greatly from it. He is the one who refers Onizuka to Holy Forest Academy, when he forgets to take the public teachers' civil service exam.

Ryuji is not adverse to showing Onizuka some tough love, such as refusing to lend him any money to cover the cost of the school trip to Okinawa - at least not until he clears up his own debts with Ryuji, although it can be interpreted that deep down, Ryuji is concerned for his friend's well-being; after all, the deeper the trouble Onizuka is in, the less likely Ryuji will ever see his money again.

In the 1998 live-action series, Ryuji Danma and Toshiyuki Saejima are combined into a singular character, Ryuji Saejima (冴島 龍二, Saejima Ryuji). He is Onizuka's best friend like Ryuji, but is also a police officer like Saejima. In the 2024 revival series, he has worked up the ranks to become a police administrator.

Toshiyuki Saejima (冴島 俊行, Saejima Toshiyuki)

- Voiced by: Kazuki Yao (Japanese); Jack Aubree (English)
- Japanese live-action actor: Naohito Fujiki, Yusuke Yamamoto (2012-Remake)

One of Eikichi Onizuka's and Ryuji Danma's old friends from their bōsōzoku days in Shonan Junai Gumi prequel to GTO, Toshiyuki Saejima is a corrupt police officer, and spends his time selling seized police evidence. He tries to convince Onizuka to buy into his scams, such as selling goods off the locker, Mercedes-Benz vehicles, counterfeit Prada handbags, handguns, poppies, pandas, Chinese immigrants among other things and "testing" out weapons from crime scenes. He apparently also hires prostitutes on a regular basis, and attempts to get Onizuka to join in his operations, so as cut costs.

Unlike Ryuji and Onizuka, Saejima seems to have difficulty in letting go of his bōsōzoku ways. Aside from his illegalities, he is willing to execute the psychotic Suguru Teshigawara in cold blood, during his rampage, so as to get a promotion, but also justifying it as "protecting the kiddies". Despite his ways, deep down, he is a good and reliable friend that Onizuka can count on and will always be there for him, even if it means his job (or his well-being).

Saejima stars in three chapters of the original manga, set entirely in Onizuka's perspective, where the reader learns more of his life and the fate of other characters from Shonan Junai Gumi.

Nagisa Nagase (長瀬 渚, Nagase Nagisa)

- Voiced by: Kae Araki (Japanese); Cindy Robinson (English)

Briefly seen in the manga, Nagisa Nagase is Ryuji Danma's attractive, grad-school girlfriend, where they first met in the GTO prequel, Shonan Junai Gumi. In the manga, when Eikichi Onizuka is exceptionally angry, and does not wish to teach the class, he is shown sitting behind his desk contemplating, while the students watch a lesson given by Nagisa through a videotape, albeit reluctantly, through its footage.

In the anime she first appears when Onizuka and Danma are having a conversation in a bar after Onizuka's interview. Onizuka tries to dive right into her bosom when Danma grabs him right by the collar and shortly starts throwing punches at Onizuka for being a bit of a lech towards Nagisa. She does not appear in the live-action.

== White Swan Youth Home ==
Ayame Shiratori (白鳥 あやめ, Shiratori Ayame)

- Japanese live-action actor: Fujisawa Ayano (2012-Remake)

Shiratori is a young woman and the prime caregiver at the White Swan youth home and a friend of Azusa Fuytsuki. She has a run in Onizuka when he first arrives back in Shonan and catches Miki shoplifting. After this she asks Onizuka to help out at the home.

Shinomi Fujisaki (藤崎 志乃美, Fujisaki Shinomi)

- Japanese live-action actor: Mirei Kiritani (2012-SP Episode)

She is an old friend of Eikichi and first appeared in Shonan Junai Gumi and now works with Shiratori at White Swan. Eikichi and her fight constantly, though she is secretly in love with him.

Miki Katsuragi (葛城 美姫, Katsuragi Miki)

- Japanese live-action actor: Nishiuchi Mariya (2012-Remake)

The daughter of a high ranking police official was placed in the White Swan facility after her mother's death as her father is too much a workaholic to care for her himself. She abuses the special emergency call function her father placed on her phone in order to get his attention.

Sakurako Sugiwara (菅原 桜子, Sugiwara Sakurako)
Sakurako was placed in the home in order to escape a broken home and her abusive father. She is afraid of cockroaches and has repeatedly slit her wrist in distress.

Ryuichi (遼一)
A video game fanatic who lived with various relatives before ultimately winding up at White Swan as he became a bother to them.

Ikuko Ogaki (大垣 郁子, Ogaki Ikuko)
A victim of an abusive mother who repeatedly beat her and scathed her with cigarettes and boiling water.

Seiya Dojima (堂島 誠也, Dojima Seiya)

- Japanese live-action actor: Shirahama Aran (2012-Remake)

Was put into the White Swan home after his mother abandoned him in order to escape the beatings of her boyfriend. Said boyfriend also beat Seiya and tattooed him against his will.

Keiichi Satomi (里見 圭一, Satomi Keiichi)

- Japanese live-action actor: Machida Hiroki (2012-Remake)

A baseball loving 15 year-old living at the White Swan home temporarily, until he and his sister are able to take care of their former boxing father after an accident at a construction site. Keiichi and Mio are the only two, with the exception of their caretakers and Onizuka, that have no real history of abuse or trauma.

Mio Satomi (里見 未央, Satomi Mio)
Keiichi's older sister.

== Aitoku Academy ==
Aitoku Academy (私立相徳学院高校, shiritsu Aitoku gakuin kōkō) is the setting of the 2024 live-action revival special, GTO Revival.

- Miyu Ayahara (綾原美結) (Sae Okazaki) is the homeroom teacher for Class 3-1, for which Onizuka assists. She has a lifelong passion for teaching, but has grown apathetic over the bureaucracy and its mental toll.
- Goji Fujiyamada (富士山田 剛司) (Shinya Kote) is the vice-principal of Aitoku Academy. He values Onizuka as a gig worker, but not as a teacher.
- Tomoko Minowa (三ノ輪 知子) (Miho Miyazawa) is the art teacher at Aitoku Academy. She is in a secret affair with Fujiyamada.
- Taichi Katsuno (勝野 太一) (Naritora Tanabe) is the physical education teacher at Aitoku Academy. He often does the work of removing students from their classrooms to face disciplinary action after they are exposed by the internet personality Sainokawara.
- Suzuka Ichikawa (市川 すずか) (Rikako Yagi) is a student in Class 3-1, and is the one to inform Onizuka about the internet personality Sainokawara that has put fear into students and teachers alike. She is the daughter of a politician, but her relationship with her father suffered after the death of her mother.
- Rin Endo (遠藤 凛) (Mei Hata) is a student in Class 3-1. She comes from a poor family, with two parents having to work constantly to make ends meet. Her father once ran a construction business, but it had been bankrupt due to being exposed as corrupt by Sainokawara.
- Uta Misaki (三崎 詩) (Momoko Kobayashi) is a student in Class 3-1. She immediately takes a liking to Onizuka, and lives solely for becoming virally popular on social media.
- Haruto Uno (宇野 晴翔) (Wataru Hinata) is a student in Class 3-1. He is a promising baseball prospect, but finds himself unable to play due to an injury, and as such has stopped attending classes altogether.

== Seishin High School ==
Seishin High School (私立誠進学園, shiritsu Seishin gakuen) is the setting of the 2026 live-action series. Each episode of the series focuses on one of the 28 students of Class 1-B, though only 11 are featured. Each student eventually would adopt a nickname that is used by the rest of the class.

- Mio Kashiwabara (柏原 実央) (Meru Nukumi) is the assistant under Onizuka of Class 1-B. She does not have any passion for teaching, and is merely using the teaching job as an opportunity to obtain a job within the school's sponsor company, Growth Talent Organization.
- Ryunosuke Miyazawa (宮澤 龍之介) (Asuka Kudo) is a former student of Onizuka who works as a liaison between the school and its sponsor company. He hires Onizuka on the spot to fill in the teaching vacancy there, and is the fiercest defender of his actions. Though not formally part of the school stuff, he also ends up doing odd jobs around the school.
- Motoko Koizumi (小泉 望都子) (Maryjun Takahashi) is the popular English teacher, and was Kashiwabara's mentor when she was a new teacher. She is a single mother, who is intrigued by Onizuka's unorthodox approach to teaching.
- Ikuto Abe (阿部 郁人) (Tomohiro Ichikawa) is the mathematics teacher. His approach to teaching contrasts that of Onizuka, preferring to teach the subject rather than being involved in the affairs of his students.
- Haruki Murayama (村山 春樹) (Atom Shukugawa) is the history teacher and guidance counselor. He is an unpopular teacher who has lost his ideals, and thus often scapegoated for the misfortunes at the school.
- Yasuhiro Ohkubo (大久保 安博) (Takashi Ukaji) is the principal at Seishin High School. He was installed into the position by the sponsor company despite having little experience in education, and largely seen as a figurehead. However, he and Onizuka come to bond together over their common love of motorcycles.
- Kenta Katayama (片山 健太) (Rikuto Morimoto) is the son of an executive at the sponsoring company, but he refuses to attend his Class 1-B. He is distant from his father, and feels guilty over the fact that his mother had died from COVID-19. He later chooses the nickname Ken-Ken for himself.
- Yui Ito (伊藤 結) (Kurumi Inagaki) is a student of Class 1-B who is willing to give Onizuka a good grade in exchange for him helping her establish a Drill Team at the school, something she wanted to do since middle school but lacked the courage to do. She later adopts the nickname Yukichi for herself.
- Ayumu Yoshida (吉田 歩夢) (Kazuki Kawaguchi) is a student of Class 1-B who aspires to be the Secretary-General of the United Nations, and thus later adopts the nickname Secretary-General. He has an unrequited crush for Kotone Wakatsuki.
- Momoka Suzuki (鈴木 百花) (Miyu Oshima) is a cheerful student of Class 1-B who is not afraid to speak her mind, even if it is only to fill awkward silences. She later adopts the nickname Momocchi.
- Wataru Tanaka (田中 航) (Momori Oikawa) is a student of Class 1-B who is behind on his school fees, and is considering dropping out to help support his family. He later adopts the nickname Big Brother.
- Itsuki Fukuda (福田 樹) (Kaede Shibasaki) is a top student of Class 1-B, who refuses to be taught by Onizuka due to believing that he is not intelligent. He later adopts the nickname Comeback.
- Hiroto Hosokawa (細川 大翔) (Shinnosuke Nishiura) is the star goalkeeper for the school's soccer team, though he would later suffer from an injury that would limit his participation. He later adopts the nickname Hero.
- Cocoa Ishibashi (石橋 心愛, Ishibashi Kokoa) (Ru Kitasato) is a student of Class 1-B who lacks self-confidence tries to follow trends. She later adopts the nickname TC ("Teacher Cocoa").
- Ayano Ashida (芦田 綾乃) (Maho Horiguchi) is a student of Class 1-B who comes from a wealthy family, who, despite appearing as a model student, has a serious distrust of Onizuka. She later adopts the nickname Seishin, after the school.
- Kotone Wakatsuki (若槻 琴音) (Kana Kajiwara) is the daughter of Masaru Watanabe, though raised by his ex-wife. She is kind and polite, but tries to not get involved with affairs, and keeps a neutral stance on Onizuka. She later adopts the nickname Seims, a shortening of seishun musume ("youthful girl").
- Soma Sato (佐藤 颯真) (Aoi Namba) is the grandson of the late chairwoman Sakurai, who is shown to be uninterested in class, and is constantly being harassed by a group of suspicious teenagers that he knows from his time in middle school. He later adopts the nickname Chairman, in honor of his grandmother.

== Other characters ==
Nanako Mizuki (水樹 ななこ, Mizuki Nanako)

- Voiced by: Yūko Miyamura (Japanese); Cindy Robinson (English)
- Japanese live-action actor: Kirari, Tanuichi Risa (2012-Remake)

Nanako Mizuki is a student at the Musashino Public High School, in a class of troublemakers that Eikichi Onizuka is assigned to for teacher training. Initially, she agrees to set Onizuka up, seducing him into taking her back to his apartment, where she undresses for him. At that moment, some of the boys from the class take a picture of Onizuka and Nanako together, threatening to release it to the media, if he doesn't pay a large sum of money. However, Onizuka is able to "persuade" the boys to keep quiet, with a little help from his old biker gang.

Despite the set-up, Onizuka agrees to take Nanako back to his apartment, after she insinuates he might be able to sleep with her. However, this is just a ruse, when she explains that due to her parents having no time for family bonding anymore, because of their tight jobs, Onizuka's small apartment reminds her of the time when her family used to live in these conditions and were much closer. This moment sparked Onizuka's revelation of actively resisting the urge to sleep with his female students.

Onizuka solves her problem by walking into Nanako's home with a sledgehammer, bashing a hole in the wall separating her parents' bedrooms, assuring her the wall will not act as a barrier between Nanako and her parents. Her parents have the physical hole filled, but she realizes that time and her efforts can heal the spiritual rift in their relationship. To show her appreciation, she briefly, and without panties, flashes for Onizuka, promising that he'll be the one to take her virginity. She does not reappear in the manga or anime after this.

In the 1998 live-action series, she is instead part of the class at Holy Forest Academy, and is one of the first students to befriend Onizuka.

Hidero Ohsawa (大沢 秀郎, Ōsawa Hiderō)

- Voiced by: Shinichiro Miki (Japanese); Ron Allen (English)

The first teacher Eikichi Onizuka meets at Musashino Public High School during training, Hidero Ohsawa has a reputation for sleeping with his female students and convinces Onizuka that teaching high school is the way to lose one's virginity. He states the prospect of having a beautiful, 16 year-old wife, even at the age of 40, is irresistible to the ears of the 22 year-old Onizuka. Upon learning that Nanako Mizuki has been staying over at Onizuka's apartment, with no action going on, Ohsawa insists that he forces himself on her, and videotape it to keep her quiet about it (ensuring that Onizuka's "merchandise" won't go to waste). However, Onizuka does not follow-up with Ohsawa's advice.

Ohsawa is not seen, after Onizuka finishes his training, but it is revealed that he was caught having an affair with a student, and left for another training session, away from Musashino High.

Makoto Fuyutsuki (冬月 まこと, Fuyutsuki Makoto)
Makoto Fuyutsuki is Azusa Fuyutsuki's 17 year-old sister. She is in the detective club in her high school, which helps her and Eikichi Onizuka a great deal, when they are trying to find a missing Azusa, who left a cryptic fax message to her parents and sister. Makoto is also adept in judo, carrying a white belt. Surprisingly, she is a big fan of hentai pro-wrestling.

Hidemi Ohta (太田 秀美, Ōta Hidemi)

- Voiced by: Tomoe Hanba (Japanese); Debra Cunningham (English)

Hidemi Ohta is the spoiled daughter of a Tokyo legislator and president of a concerned parents' group (not the Parent-Teacher Association group). Suguru Teshigawara is her math tutor, and through him, develops a dominatrix-type of persona, having him lick her feet. She tries to get Eikichi Onizuka to do the same, on threat of having him fired from Holy Forest from her legislator father, but is summarily kidnapped by the yakuza, who wants to use her as blackmail against her father. However, Onizuka follows the kidnappers to their hideout, where he engages them, rescues Hidemi and hurries back to finish his examinations, even though he is heavily wounded during the fight.

Hidemi's parents eventually arrive at Holy Forest, and though it seems they are there to chastise Onizuka's presence as a schoolteacher there, they see in him a "true educator", and are moved to tears for rescuing their daughter. Mr. Ohta gives Onizuka his full support, just as the results of Onizuka's examinations are being printed.

Yoshiko Uchiyamada (内山田 好子, Uchiyamada Yoshiko)

- Voiced by: Atsuko Bungo (Japanese); Kate Davis (English)
- Japanese live-action actor: Erika Mabuchi, Komatsu Mizuki (2012-Remake)

The daughter of Hiroshi Uchiyamada, Yoshiko Uchiyamada is into designer handbags, ganguro fashion, and according to her father, "single handedly keeps the tanning salon industry alive". Although Eikichi Onizuka abstained from any sexual relations with students, he and Yoshiko meet at a karaoke place and strike a quick friendship, the connotations of which severely anger her father. The "gap" between Yoshiko and her father is already large to begin with, as she openly disdains him for his deluded imaginings and not living up to her own material expectations.

It is implied in the manga that she may not be Hiroshi Uchiyamada's biological daughter, but the meat delivery man's, though this could be argued as another one of Uchiyamada's paranoid delusions.

Julia Murai (村井 樹里亜, Murai Juria)

- Voiced by: Megumi Ogata (Japanese); Cindy Robinson (English)
- Japanese live-action actor: Rikako Murakami, Yoshida Yo (2012-Remake)

Kunio Murai's attractive mother, 27 year-old Julia Murai carried Kunio at the age of thirteen, and chose to run away to be able to keep him, when her parents disowned her and Kunio's father abandoned her. Julia works as a crane operator at a local construction yard, and is known to wearing skimpy outfits and no bra. On occasion she would also model bridal gowns for her boss (which led her son to think she will be married to a man who looks like Dr. Elefun). Although Eikichi Onizuka swore off relations with female students, their mothers are still available, thus, he attempts to woo her on multiple occasions, even asking her out once.

In the 1998 live-action series, her name is instead Tsubasa Murai (村井 つばさ, Murai Tsubasa)). In the 2024 revival special and 2026 live-action series, Kunio's restaurants are named TSUBASA, in her honor.

Noboru Saito (斎藤 さいとう のぼる 昇, Saitou Noboru)

Kyousuke Masaki (真樹 京介, Masaki Kyōsuke)
Kyousuke Masaki is Eikichi Onizuka's deceased idol from his bōsōzoku days, and the original owner of his Kawasaki ZII. Although he first appeared in the predecessor to GTO, Shonan Junai Gumi, Kyousuke appears briefly in a vision while Onizuka is in a coma, urging him to go on and become the greatest teacher in Japan.

Heihachi Mishima (三島平八, Mishima Heihachi)

- Voiced by: Daisuke Gōri

Heihachi Mishima is based on the Tekken video game character of the same name. In Great Teacher Onizuka, he makes a cameo as a former detective, now working for his own company, the Mishima Zaibatsu.
