= GTO: 14 Days in Shonan =

Japanese manga series

- First volume cover, featuring Eikichi Onizuka
- Manga
- Written by: Tōru Fujisawa
- Published by: Kodansha
- English publisher: NA: Vertical (print); Kodansha USA (digital)
- Imprint: Shōnen Magazine Comics
- Magazine: Weekly Shōnen Magazine
- Original run: June 10, 2009 – September 14, 2011
- Volumes: 9
- Preceded by
- Shonan Junai Gumi (1990–1996); Bad Company (1996); Great Teacher Onizuka (1997–2002)
- Followed by
- GTO: Paradise Lost (2014–2024)
- icon

GTO: 14 Days in Shonan, known as GTO Shonan 14Days in Japan, is a Japanese manga series written and illustrated by Tōru Fujisawa. It is a side story to the main Great Teacher Onizuka manga series. It was published in Kodansha's Weekly Shōnen Magazine from June 2009 to September 2011, with its chapters collected into nine tankōbon volumes.

== Plot ==
GTO: 14 Days in Shonan is set immediately after Great Teacher Onizuka's Teshigawara story arc. Following getting shot by former teacher Teshigawara, Eikichi Onizuka is hospitalized but soon escapes, disappearing for fourteen days. During this period, a wanted poster surfaces showing a man resembling Onizuka, which raises questions about his actions while he was missing. The story is framed around uncovering what occurred during those two weeks away from Holy Forest Academy.

Seeking to lie low after damaging his school's reputation, Onizuka returns to his hometown of Shonan, a coastal area known for its surf culture. There, he becomes involved with a group of troubled foster children facing neglect and abuse. Onizuka applies his unconventional methods to address their personal struggles. Over the course of fourteen days, he confronts local conflicts and systemic problems affecting the children, ultimately revealing how his actions during this period led to both the wanted notice and his return to Tokyo.

== Publication ==
Written and illustrated by Tōru Fujisawa, GTO: 14 Days in Shonan is a side story to the main manga series Great Teacher Onizuka. It was serialized in Kodansha's Weekly Shōnen Magazine from June 10, 2009, to September 14, 2011. Kodansha compiled its chapters into nine tankōbon volumes, released from October 16, 2009, to November 17, 2011. A three-chapter spin-off, titled Black Diamond, was later published in Weekly Shōnen Magazine in November 2011.

In North America, Vertical announced the English language release of the manga in May 2011. The nine volumes were published from January 31, 2012, to May 28, 2013. Kodansha USA published the volumes digitally on February 1, 2022.

=== Volumes ===
| No. | Original release date | Original ISBN | English release date | English ISBN |
|---|---|---|---|---|
| 1 | October 16, 2009 | 978-4-06-384201-2 | January 31, 2012 | 978-1-932234-88-6 |
| 2 | December 17, 2009 | 978-4-06-384229-6 | March 27, 2012 | 978-1-932234-89-3 |
| 3 | March 17, 2010 | 978-4-06-384271-5 | May 29, 2012 | 978-1-932234-92-3 |
| 4 | July 16, 2010 | 978-4-06-384336-1 | July 24, 2012 | 978-1-932234-93-0 |
| 5 | October 15, 2010 | 978-4-06-384385-9 | September 25, 2012 | 978-1-932234-98-5 |
| 6 | February 17, 2011 | 978-4-06-384450-4 | November 27, 2012 | 978-1-932234-99-2 |
| 7 | September 16, 2011 | 978-4-06-384553-2 | January 29, 2013 | 978-1-935654-51-3 |
| 8 | October 17, 2011 | 978-4-06-384570-9 | March 26, 2013 | 978-1-935654-62-9 |
| 9 | November 17, 2011 | 978-4-06-384584-6 | May 28, 2013 | 978-1-935654-63-6 |
