= Bad Company (manga) =

1998 one volume prequel to Shonan Junai Gumi

- Tankōbon volume cover, featuring Ryuji Danma (left), Eikichi Onizuka (center), and Sakura Yamato (front)
- Manga
- Written by: Tōru Fujisawa
- Published by: Kodansha
- Magazine: Weekly Shōnen Magazine
- Original run: January 8, 1996 – July 31, 1996
- Volumes: 1
- Live-action film

Shonan Junai Gumi! Bad Company
- Directed by: Noboru Matsui
- Written by: Shunmichi Okowa
- Released: June 5, 1998
- Runtime: 93 minutes
- Preceded by
- Shonan Junai Gumi (1990–1996)
- Followed by
- Great Teacher Onizuka (1997–2002); GTO: 14 Days in Shonan (2009–2011); GTO: Paradise Lost (2014–2024)
- icon

Bad Company (stylized in all caps) is a Japanese manga series written and illustrated by Tōru Fujisawa. It was serialized in Kodansha's shōnen manga magazine Weekly Shōnen Magazine in two parts; the first was published in January 1996 and the second from June to July of that same year. Its chapters were collected in a single tankōbon volume. The series is a prequel to Fujisawa's Shonan Junai Gumi manga series.

== Plot ==
Ryuji Danma is a delinquent transfer student who becomes obsessed with Eikichi Onizuka after witnessing his violent victory in a street fight. Determined to provoke Onizuka into a decisive battle, Ryuji is frustrated when his rival dismisses schoolyard power struggles, instead spending time repairing a salvaged Kawasaki Z400GP motorcycle with friends. Sakura Yamato, a mutual acquaintance, bridges their divide by revealing Onizuka's carefree philosophy, eventually drawing Ryuji into the group. Their camaraderie is tested when the Skull Gang, a local biker group, steals the restored motorcycle. Onizuka and Ryuji confront the thieves, leading to an intervention by the Running Wild Angels—a prominent bōsōzoku gang led by Masaki. Impressed by Onizuka's defiance, Masaki invites the boys to ride with his gang.

Ryuji's life takes another turn when he meets Natsuki, a former Running Wild Angels member. After learning he has been locked out of his home, she gifts him her Honda CBX motorcycle, unknowingly entangling him in her violent past. During a group ride, Masaki recognizes the bike, exposing Natsuki's history with the gang. The conflict escalates when her abusive ex-boyfriend, Akira Nezu—claiming ownership of the CBX—beats her and extorts Ryuji. In a final confrontation, Natsuki stabs Nezu in self-defense and is arrested, though she is later released due to his minor injuries. The story concludes with Ryuji maintaining the CBX in anticipation of Natsuki's return, while Onizuka and the group plan a trip to Tokyo.

== Media ==
=== Manga ===
Written and illustrated by Tōru Fujisawa, Bad Company was serialized in Kodansha's shōnen manga magazine Weekly Shōnen Magazine; the first part was published from January 8–31, 1996, and the second from June 26 to July 31 of that same year. Kodansha collected its chapters in a single tankōbon volume, released on June 17, 1997.

=== Film ===
A direct-to-video film, titled Shonan Junai Gumi! Bad Company (湘南純愛組!バッドカンパニー), was released on June 5, 1998.
