= Kamen Teacher =

Japanese manga series

- Manga volume 1 cover

仮面ティーチャー (Kamen Tīchā)
- Manga
- Written by: Tōru Fujisawa
- Published by: Shueisha
- Imprint: Young Jump Comics
- Magazine: Weekly Young Jump
- Original run: August 24, 2006 – October 25, 2007
- Volumes: 4
- Manga

Kamen Teacher Black
- Written by: Tōru Fujisawa
- Published by: Shueisha
- Imprint: Young Jump Comics
- Magazine: Weekly Young Jump
- Original run: April 25, 2013 – October 16, 2014
- Volumes: 5
- Television drama
- Directed by: Kentaro Moriya; Ryūichi Honda; Koutarō Gotō; Toshimitsu Chimura; Kengo Takimoto
- Produced by: Harukazu Morizane; Hiroyuki Ueno; Tetsuya Sakashita; Shōko Maehata
- Written by: Junpei Yamaoka
- Music by: Luv Sick by Kis-My-Ft2
- Original network: Nippon TV
- Original run: July 7, 2013 – September 29, 2013
- Episodes: 12
- Live-action film

Gekijouban Kamen Teacher
- Directed by: Kentaro Moriya
- Written by: Junpei Yamaoka
- Music by: Luv Sick by Kis-My-Ft2
- Released: February 22, 2014
- Runtime: 93 minutes
- icon

Kamen Teacher (Japanese: 仮面ティーチャー, Hepburn: Kamen Tīchā; lit. 'Masked Teacher') is a Japanese manga series written and illustrated by Tōru Fujisawa. It was serialized in Shueisha's Weekly Young Jump magazine from 2006 to 2007. A sequel manga, titled Kamen Teacher Black was published in the same magazine from 2013 to 2014. It was adapted into a live action television series in 2013 and was adapted into a live action film in 2014. The special for this film was broadcast by NTV on February 14, 2014, on Kinyou Roadshow.

== Characters ==
- Taisuke Fujigaya as Araki Gota
- Aya Omasa as Ichimura Miki
- Takumi Saito as Iikura Rui
- Fuma Kikuchi as Takehara Kinzo
- Jesse as Kusanagi Keigo
- Yuta Kishi as Shishimaru
- Taiga Kyomoto as Bon
- Yanagi Shuntaro as Ryōta
- Taketomi Seika as Kondo Kanako
- Maeda Goki as Kotaro
- Tsukada Ryoichi as Kinpatsu Sensei
- Shiga Kotaro as Sugawara Kentaro
- Shintaro Yamada as Tooyama Shunsaku
- Fujisawa Ayano as Honda Ayumi
- Musaka Naomasa as Kobayashi Tōbē
- Yamamoto Maika as Kobayashi Saeko

== Media ==
=== Manga ===
Kamen Teacher, written and illustrated by Tōru Fujisawa, was serialized in Shueisha's seinen manga magazine Weekly Young Jump from August 24, 2006, to October 25, 2007. Shueisha collected its chapters in four tankōbon volumes, released from April 19 to December 19, 2007.

A sequel, titled Kamen Teacher Black (仮面ティーチャーBLACK), was serialized in Weekly Young Jump from April 25, 2013, to October 16, 2014. Shueisha collected its chapters in five tankōbon volumes, released from August 19, 2013, to December 19, 2014.

==== Volume list ====
===== Kamen Teacher =====
No.	Japanese release date	Japanese ISBN
1	April 19, 2007	978-4-08-877232-5
2	June 19, 2007	978-4-08-877281-3
3	September 19, 2007	978-4-08-877321-6
4	December 19, 2007	978-4-08-877364-3

===== Kamen Teacher Black =====
No.	Japanese release date	Japanese ISBN
1	August 19, 2013	978-4-08-879634-5
2	November 19, 2013	978-4-08-879712-0
3	February 19, 2014	978-4-08-879752-6
4	June 19, 2014	978-4-08-879795-3
5	December 19, 2014	978-4-08-890041-4
