= Shonan Junai Gumi =

Japanese manga series

- First tankōbon volume cover, featuring Ryuji Danma (left) and Eikichi Onizuka (right)

湘南純愛組! (Shōnan Jun'ai Gumi!)
- Genre: Action; Comedy; Yankī
- Manga
- Written by: Tōru Fujisawa
- Published by: Kodansha
- English publisher: NA: Tokyopop (former); Vertical
- Magazine: Weekly Shōnen Magazine
- Original run: October 10, 1990 – October 2, 1996
- Volumes: 31
- Original video animation
- Directed by: Katsumi Minoguchi (1–2); Gyou Suzuki (3); Takeshi Yamaguchi (4); Noboru Matsui (5)
- Produced by: Mitsuo Sejima
- Written by: Hideo Nanbu
- Music by: Mao Saeki
- Studio: J.C.Staff; Life Work
- Released: January 21, 1994 – January 24, 1997
- Runtime: 44–51 minutes (each)
- Episodes: 5
- Television drama
- Directed by: Hideo Nanbu; Noboru Matsui
- Original run: January 27, 1995 – April 25, 1997
- Episodes: 5
- Manga

Shonan Seven
- Written by: Tōru Fujisawa
- Illustrated by: Shinsuke Takahashi
- Published by: Akita Shoten
- Magazine: Monthly Shōnen Champion
- Original run: January 6, 2014 – July 6, 2019
- Volumes: 17
- Television drama
- Directed by: Eiji Uchida; Yusaku Matsumoto; Nobuhiro Suzumura
- Studio: Atmovie
- Licensed by: Amazon Prime Video
- Original run: February 28, 2020
- Episodes: 8
- Followed by
- Bad Company (1996); Great Teacher Onizuka (1997–2002); GTO: 14 Days in Shonan (2009–2011); GTO: Paradise Lost (2014–2024)
- icon

Shonan Junai Gumi (Japanese: 湘南純愛組!, Hepburn: Shōnan Jun'ai Gumi!; lit. 'Shōnan Pure Love Gang!') is a Japanese manga series written and illustrated by Tōru Fujisawa. It was published in Kodansha's shōnen manga magazine Weekly Shōnen Magazine from October 1990 to October 1996, compiled in 31 tankōbon volumes. A 15-volume bunkoban edition was released from May to December 2005. The story follows the youth of Eikichi Onizuka and his best friend Ryuji Danma while they are still in high school but have already formed their shock duo the Oni-Baku Combi.

Multiple adaptations were established during the series’ run, such as a five-episode original video animation (OVA) series released on VHS from 1994 to 1997, a television drama, and several live action movies. The bunkoban edition of the manga was licensed in North America by Tokyopop, which retitled it as GTO: The Early Years, although the editions retain Shonan Junai Gumi as a subtitle. The first volume was released in June 2006. The Tokyopop editions ended with volume 10. Publisher Vertical Inc continued and concluded the series in 2012.

The character Eikichi Onizuka would later star in the sequel series Great Teacher Onizuka. By January 2020, Shonan Junai Gumi had over 45 million copies in circulation, making it one of the best-selling manga series in history.

== Plot ==
The story of Shonan Junai Gumi deals with the Oni-Baku (鬼爆コンビ; "Demon Explosion") duo, consisting of Eikichi Onizuka and Ryuji Danma, and their quest to lose their virginity and reach maturity. They are widely feared Bōsōzoku, and are known for their tenacity and viciousness in a fight. However, this lifestyle does not endear them to the opposite gender, so they decide to change their ways—although that is not an easy task for them. The series focuses on the Oni-Baku's wide range of friends and foes, and the crazy situations they all get into. The story begins as a gag manga, but more serious issues present themselves as it continues.

== Characters ==
=== Oni-Baku and friends ===
Eikichi Onizuka (鬼塚英吉, Onizuka Eikichi)
Voiced by: Issei Futamata
Portrayed by: Naoki Miyashita (1995 drama), Kanichiro (2020 drama)
A former member of the Running-Wild Angels (暴走天使, Bōsō Tenshi) biker gang, once regarded its leader, Kyousuke Masaki, as an elder brother. During junior high, he initially clashed with Ryuji Danma, though the two later formed a strong friendship. Eikichi is skilled in combat but awkward around women. Beneath his rough exterior, he has a kindhearted nature and often aids others despite his rebellious demeanor. He resides with his mother in an apartment and rides a Kawasaki Zephyr 1100, while also owning Masaki's ZII motorcycle.
Ryuji Danma (弾間龍二, Danma Ryūji)
Voiced by: Hideyuki Hori
Portrayed by: Yoshiyuki Yamaguchi (1995 drama), Daichi Kaneko (2020 drama)
The other half of the Oni-baku duo, is taller and somewhat more composed than his partner, though his temper makes him dangerous when provoked. Unlike Eikichi, he fares better with women, having been involved with his former teacher Ayumi and later Nagisa. His affluent family strongly disapproves of his rebellious lifestyle, though his elder sister Yoko occasionally shelters him. Ryuji is a skilled mechanic who owns a motorcycle shop, and participates in illegal street races. He rides a Honda CBX-400F, a bike featured in Bad Company.
Toshiyuki Saejima (冴島俊行, Saejima Toshiyuki)
Voiced by: Ken Narita
Alongside Kamata, Saejima is feared as one of the "Mad Dogs of Kamakura", notorious for their violent tactics—including an infamous pencil assault. After being defeated by the Oni-Baku duo, he and Kamata join their gang. With an intimidating appearance that unnerves women and even his own wealthy family, Saejima is often mistaken for a yakuza. His relatives are so fearful that his sisters communicate through a locked door, and his parents flinch at his presence. He rides a Kawasaki motorcycle. Later, in GTO, he becomes a corrupt police officer, while in the spin-off Ino-Head Gargoyle, he continues operating on the fringes of the law.
Jun Kamata (鎌田純, Kamata Jun)
Voiced by: Nobuyuki Hiyama
He initially appears as an antagonist alongside Saejima until their defeat by the Oni-Baku leads them to reform. Known for his immense strength, Kamata can single-handedly overpower entire gangs when angered. His troubled past includes the traumatic suicide of his childhood friend's sister after her assault by a gang, followed by his friend Natsu killing the perpetrators—an act Kamata mistakenly perceived as betrayal. After leaving Japan for the U.S., he later returns in the series' finale working at a bar. He rides a Honda Steed. In Ino-Head Gargoyle, he becomes a junior officer seeking vengeance against drug dealers who harmed his younger brother, aided by former allies.
Hiroshi Abe (阿部寛, Abe Hiroshi)
Voiced by: Masaki Aizawa
Originally from Iwamisawa in Hokkaidō, Abe is a charismatic womanizer whose flashy style and confidence attract constant female attention—much to the Oni-Baku’s initial annoyance. After being convinced to share his "secrets", he joins their gang and proves fiercely loyal, standing by them in clashes like the Midnight Angels conflict and the fight against Kamata and Saejima. Though he fades from focus later in the manga, his absence is never addressed, implying he remains part of the group offscreen. He rides a Honda CBX 1000. By the time of GTO, his fortunes have declined; once the owner of multiple stores, he struggles to maintain a single business while lamenting his baldness and impotence.
Tsuyoshi Tsukai (塚井強, Tsukai Tsuyoshi)
Voiced by: Takumi Yamazaki (1, 2), Toshiyuki Morikawa (4)
A former member of Enoshima Yonchuu Junior High's "Shitennou" (Four Heavenly Kings), later joins the Oni-Baku after transferring to Tsujidou High. As Kunito Nakajo's kohai, he possesses unique insights within the group. He is a skilled, though not elite, fighter who consistently triumphs against tough opponents. His relationship with Yui Itou evolves from a one-sided crush to a committed romance. In GTO, Saejima reveals Tsukai married Itou and had a child while maintaining his biker lifestyle, as seen in GTO: 14 Days in Shonan where he continues riding alongside Katsuyuki despite joining an athletic club.
Makoto Hashiri (走真, Hashiri Makoto)
Voiced by: Nobutoshi Canna
Makoto is a steadfast member of the Oni-Baku, known more for his loyalty than his combat ability. Though less skilled in fights than his peers, he consistently supports his friends, even after being manipulated into briefly betraying them during the clash between the Kamakura and Shonan gangs. Previously bullied by Saejima and Kamata before their reformation, he later proves his courage by standing by the group. He is popular with women and eventually forms a lasting relationship with a girl named Mami.
Katsuyuki Tsumoto (津元克幸, Tsumoto Katsuyuki)
Voiced by: Showtaro Morikubo
Katsuyuki leads the K.T. Butai, a subgroup of the Oni-Baku composed of fellow students like Yasuo and Atsushi. Known for his explosive temper, he often instigates conflicts—particularly with rivals Tamura and Kenkichi Hino. After losing a fight to Eikichi, he begins idolizing him, remaining fiercely loyal to both Eikichi and the Oni-Baku. By the events of GTO: 14 Days in Shonan, he works at a junkyard but continues his biker lifestyle alongside Tsukai.
Yasuo (ヤスオ)
A devoted member of Katsuyuki's gang who initially resents the Oni-Baku's influence but grows loyal to them through his unwavering allegiance to "Ka-chan". He frequently clashes with students from Enoshima Shogyou, harboring a particular grudge against them. Yasuo appears regularly and occasionally takes prominent roles in the story. He rides a Yamaha XJ-R and maintains a relationship with his girlfriend Mayumi.
Saegusa (三草)
A K.T. Butai member resembling Saejima and Makoto who regularly appears with Katsuyuki's group. He fights without hesitation, even when vastly outnumbered like during a café brawl against Enoshou students. He rides a Honda CB-SF.
Kitamura (北村)
Kitamura appears least often among the K.T. Butai members, serving primarily as a background character. He is present during the Oni-Baku's encounter with the intimidating Kiwamezawa, reacting nervously to his imposing presence. Beyond these minor appearances, he plays no substantial role in the group's activities.
Atsushi Honma (あつし, Atsushi)
A K.T. Butai member who endures repeated violence from the Oni-Baku's foes—including brutal attacks by Yagyou Atsuki and a DOA gang member. Despite this, he consistently participates in major battles, maintaining unwavering loyalty to his senpai Onizuka and Katsuyuki.
Yui Itou (伊藤唯, Itō Yui)
Voiced by: Hekiru Shiina
Itou initially helps the Oni-Baku by providing information about Kamata and Saejima, having attended the same junior high. Though she develops feelings for Eikichi, his rivalry over Kaoru leads to a conflict between Tsukai and Onizuka. She ultimately becomes Tsukai's longtime girlfriend, with their relationship progressing to marriage and parenthood by GTO. As the first female accepted into the Oni-Baku's circle, she frequently appears in later volumes during group gatherings.
Shinomi Fujisaki (藤崎志乃美, Fujisaki Shinomi)
Voiced by: Akiko Hiramatsu
Portrayed by: Satou Shinobu (1995 drama), Misato Morita (2020 drama)
Shinomi first appears as an overweight, bullied girl protected by Eikichi, later transforming into an attractive woman involved with Idaten gang member Takezawa Akira. After Eikichi hospitalizes Takezawa and ends their relationship, she joins the Oni-Baku's circle, dyeing her hair blonde. Though harboring romantic feelings for Eikichi, he views her platonically as a sister figure. With her fiery personality and fighting spirit—essentially a female version of Eikichi—she befriends Nagisa and frequently appears alongside her. In later series, she works as a makeup artist, including for Tomoko in GTO, and briefly assists at White Swan in GTO: 14 Days in Shonan while subtly recognizing Onizuka's teaching identity.
Nagisa Nagase (長瀬渚, Nagase Nagisa)
Voiced by: Megumi Hayashibara
Portrayed by: Kasumi Yamaya (2020 drama)
Nagisa works as a waitress at Marine House seafood restaurant when Ryuji first notices her. Though appearing gentle, she struggles with dissociative identity disorder, manifesting an aggressive alter ego named Yasha. This condition stems from her traumatic rape by Junya Akutsu, leader of the Midnight Angels gang to which she belongs. After Ryuji rescues her, she conquers her psychological struggles and becomes his devoted girlfriend, remaining with him through the events of GTO.
Yoshio Tamaru (田丸善男, Tamaru Yoshio)
Motivated by his grandfather's final words to become "strong", the once-timid Yoshio joins the Oni-Baku to reinvent himself. His aggressive fighting style quickly clashes with Eikichi and Ryuji's leadership. After seizing control of the rogue Atsuki Yagyou gang—who had been tarnishing the Oni-Baku's name—he escalates tensions to a deadly confrontation. In their final encounter, his antique firearm misfires during a standoff with Eikichi, severely wounding his own hands before disappearing from the story permanently.

=== Foes ===
Machida (町田)
Voiced by: Ikuya Sawaki
An eyebrowless boxing champion who initially defeats Eikichi through deception—using a knuckle-duster and evasive tactics before finishing him with a street sign. While skilled, his victory relies entirely on the element of surprise. When they meet again, Ryuji dismantles Machida's gang singlehandedly while Eikichi overwhelms the boxer in a brutal rematch, absorbing his punches and retaliating with devastating force.
Takashi Yokokawa (横川たかし, Yokokawa Takashi)
The mustachioed yakuza successor and former senpai of the Oni-Baku endured constant humiliation at their hands—most of it well-deserved. After fading from the main story, he makes a final appearance reacting to the gang's fate in the concluding volume, displaying characteristically little sympathy for their circumstances.
Mitsuaki Okubo (大久保光明, Ōkubo Mitsuaki)
Voiced by: Hisao Egawa
Nicknamed "Eguriya" (Slasher) for his brutal knife attacks, Okubo is a Kyokuto High alumnus and Madara gang member. He resurfaces to settle unfinished business with Eikichi, having previously stabbed him during a fight. Despite Eikichi battling with a broken foot, he overwhelms Okubo in their violent rematch, nearly beating him to death.
Fumiya Shindoji (神堂寺郁也, Shindōji Fumiya)
The younger brother of Ayumi's late fiancé. He initially seeks to sabotage her relationship with Ryuji. As a Kyokuto High student leading a sizable gang—including member Asakura Yoshiaki—he kidnaps Ayumi before being defeated by Ryuji. He later returns as an ally, riding a Yamaha V-Max. In GTO: 14 Days in Shonan, he assists Onizuka while working as a Tokyo Artists Production representative.
Junya Akutsu (阿久津淳也, Akutsu Jun'ya)
Voiced by: Takehito Koyasu
The second leader of the Midnight Angels. He harbored jealousy toward Eikichi for stealing his mentor Masaki's attention years earlier. Seeking to restore the gang's dominance, he recruits the Idaten and manipulates Nagisa in a failed attempt to kill Ryuji. Known for petrol arson, his feud with Satsuriku Butai's Kamishima stems from a fiery confrontation during their Midnight Angels days. After defeats by Onizuka and Kamishima, he later aids the Oni-Baku when needed. In later appearances, he leads a revived Midnight Angels in GTO: 14 Days in Shonan, still displaying his reckless nature, and assists Kamata's revenge plot in Ino-Head Gargoyle alongside Nakajo and his gang members.
Junji Kashiya (柏屋ジュンジ, Kashiwaya Junji)
The chain-smoking leader of the Blue Rose gang and yakuza heir. He earns his "Tobacco Guy" nickname through constant cigarette use. Preferring manipulation over direct confrontation, he controls subordinate gangs like DOA while maintaining a longstanding rivalry with Kunito Nakajo over Shonan's underworld affairs.
Akira Takezawa (武沢明, Takezawa Akira)
Takezawa leads the Idaten gang and dates Shinomi Fujisaki until his brutal defeat by Onizuka leaves him hospitalized, ending their relationship. Though Akutsu temporarily absorbs his gang into the Midnight Angels, the Idaten members refuse to turn against their true leader when Takezawa returns. He resurfaces later upon recognizing Eikichi's new girlfriend Misato Hazuki—a former Idaten member now radically changed from her gang days.
Joey (ジョーイ, Jōi)
Joey, the pain-insensitive leader of the Blue Rose-affiliated DOA gang, carries the trauma of his girlfriend Yoko's tragic death. His clashes with the Oni-Baku end inconclusively, while a high-speed race against Onizuka sends him crashing into the ocean—a near-death experience that prompts reflection after his brother rescues him. By GTO: 14 Days in Shonan, he redeems himself as owner of Yokosuka's L-club.
Natsuki Smith-Mizuki (水樹・スミス・夏希)
Nicknamed "Shinigami", Natsu was Kamata's childhood friend until an incident shattered their bond. When Kamata's sister Fuyuka took her own life after a brutal gang assault, Natsu slaughtered her attackers in retaliation. Kamata, misunderstanding Natsu's actions as betrayal, inadvertently caused his arrest by bringing adults to intervene. Over the following years, Natsu's violent rampages against rivals earned him the Yokohama Group's enmity. His life ended when Nakagaki shot him in the back as he helped Kamata up—a final act of loyalty. Honoring their childhood pact, Kamata departed for America shortly after Natsu's death.
Nakagaki (中垣) (Yokohama Group No. 1)
Nakagaki arrives as a brutal antagonist determined to demonstrate his gang's dominance over Shonan's factions. He disrupts a fight between Katsuyuki and Tamura, teaming with Mauchi to defeat them both, then later singlehandedly overwhelms an entire diner of Enoshou students. His deep-seated grudge against Natsu—marked by a facial scar from their past—leads him to fatally shoot Natsu during a major gang confrontation. This provokes Eikichi to deliver a savage beating in retribution.
Mauchi (真内) (Yokohama Group No. 2)
Mauchi operates silently beside Nakagaki, his surgical mask and quiet demeanor masking formidable fighting skills. Though underestimated as a mere subordinate, he defeats multiple gang members during the Yokohama conflict. While Nakajo initially overpowers him, Nakagaki retaliates by crushing Nakajo with a chair—demonstrating their effective partnership, seen again when they overwhelm Katsuyuki and Tamura. Mauchi's durability shines when he withstands an iron bar to the neck and continues fighting Ryuji. His final defeat comes at Kamata's hands after Onizuka dismantles Nakagaki.
Toshiki Kamishima (神島俊生, Kamishima Toshiki)
Voiced by: Yasunori Matsumoto
The leader of the Satsuriku Butai. He carries deep scars from Akutsu's petrol attack during their Midnight Angels days. Now locked in a three-way conflict against both Akutsu and the Oni-Baku, he rides a Kawasaki GPZ900R into battle. Though soundly defeated by Akutsu and caught in one of his explosions, Kamishima survives—only to resurface later when the Oni-Baku mistake an Atsuki Yagyou member (riding an identical bike) for him. The series concludes with Kamishima institutionalized, physically healed but mentally broken, his original scars remaining as grim reminders of his violent past.

=== Other characters ===
Ayumi Murakoshi (村越鮎美, Murakoshi Ayumi)
Voiced by: Hiromi Tsuru
Portrayed by: Nin Nakayama (1995 drama), Yanagi Yurina (2020 drama)
During their first encounter on Yoron Shima, the Oni-Baku meet teachers Ayumi and Mariko—Eikichi pursues casual flings while Ryuji develops genuine feelings for Ayumi. Their relationship persists despite her fabricated identity and interference from Fumiya Shindouji, who reveals Ayumi's tragic past engagement to his deceased brother. When marriage plans surface, Ayumi selflessly abandons Ryuji to prevent depriving him of youthful experiences, leaving him devastated. Though he later forms a relationship with Nagisa, Ayumi's sporadic reappearances continue to unsettle their dynamic, much to Nagisa's frustration.
Mariko Izumo (出雲真理子, Izumo Mariko)
Voiced by: Masako Katsuki
Portrayed by: Shiori Yoshida (2020 drama)
During their encounter on Yoron Shima, Eikichi persistently pursues Mariko with crude advances, unaware she and Ayumi are actually teachers. Though initially seeking revenge after discovering their true identities, Eikichi eventually develops a mutual understanding with Mariko. Following Ayumi's departure, Mariko becomes a recurring ally who helps the group out of trouble. Her background includes yakuza connections as a crime boss's daughter and former membership in Kadena Nao's "Purple Haze" gang.
Nao Kadena (嘉手納南風, Kadena Nao)
Voiced by: Michiko Neya
Portrayed by: Noriko Tachikawa (1995 drama)
Kadena Nao, a former street racer turned Tsujikou teacher, replaces the absent Nanno. She motivates students through her charm—inspiring boys with her beauty and girls with promises of attractive university connections. Haunted by guilt over her brother Kazuhito's racing accident that left him comatose, she regains her passion for driving after racing Onizuka, who demonstrates responsible enjoyment of the sport. Her later attempt to matchmake Shinomi with Eikichi ends awkwardly.
Youkou Minamino (南野用高, Minamino Yōkō)
Nanno, a hardened teacher with yakuza-like demeanor, initially controls his delinquent students through fear and intimidation. His authoritarian rule faces rebellion when Ryuji challenges him to a fight. Though Nanno's superior "Hokuto Shinken" martial arts would easily defeat Ryuji, the Oni-Baku uncover his secret lolita complex. They blackmail him using Myou-chan (a girl who always wears a black strip over her eyes), forcing him to take a fall in the fight. Humiliated, Nanno becomes the gang's reluctant errand boy until finally leaving the school after clashing with Kiwamezawa and fleeing from police.
Masami Sato (佐藤昌美, Sato Masami)
Voiced by: Tetsuya Iwanaga
A longtime ally since their Midnight Angels days, Sato operates a family-owned garage and repair shop. His first significant appearance involves breaking the news to Eikichi about his failed car design, which leads to Yokokawa taking him hostage until repairing the KS Benz. He later plays supporting roles during the Akutsu conflict and routinely assists the group with motorcycle repairs, including when Onizuka needs to use Masaki's ZII.
Kunito Nakajo (仲条國士, Nakajō Kunito)
Voiced by: Toshiyuki Morikawa
Nakajo commands all Enoshima gangs as a prominent figure at Enoshima Shogyou High. Formerly Tsukai's senpai and leader of the Enoshima Midnight Angels division, his scarred face reflects his violent past. Though the Oni-Baku previously defeated his entire gang, creating lingering tension, Nakajo becomes a valuable ally against threats like the Yokohama Group and Atsuki Yagyou. Typically avoiding petty school conflicts, he eventually challenges Eikichi to a decisive one-on-one fight.
Akimitsu Tamura (田村亜希光, Tamura Akimitsu)
Tamura serves as second-in-command to Toshiki Kamishima in Kamakura's Satsuriku Butai, where his enduring rivalry with Katsuyuki begins through repeated violent clashes. Their conflict pauses temporarily when Nakagaki and Mauchi brutally defeat them both, hospitalizing the rivals. During recovery, they compete for nurse Nene Mihara's attention—a former respected gang member—before uniting against Sakaki Ashura. Tamura later becomes Nakajo's lieutenant while maintaining his feud with Katsuyuki.
Onizuka's mom
Mrs. Onizuka struggles to manage her son's delinquent behavior before finally evicting him from their apartment. A resilient single mother who had Eikichi young, she works as a club hostess while maintaining an attractive appearance with her long, wavy hair. Though Eikichi's father—former leader of the Speed motorcycle gang—remains absent, his womanizing tendencies are later revealed to explain his disappearance. By GTO: 14 Days in Shonan, she relocates to Hawaii, leaving Eikichi to fend for himself.
Yoshiaki Asakura (朝倉良明, Asakura Yoshiaki)
Voiced by: Hiro Yuuki
Yoshiaki, a Kyokuto student subordinate to Fumiya, initially falls victim to the Oni-Baku during their confrontation. Later coerced into serving Okubo after his girlfriend Natsumi's kidnapping, he ultimately betrays Okubo by summoning the Oni-Baku's help—despite fighting with a broken foot against overwhelming odds. After these events, he and Natsumi resume normal life, though he reappears disrupting police operations with his gang during the Midnight Angels conflict.
Usagi Kiwamezawa (極沢うさぎ, Kiwamezawa Usagi)
Kiwamezawa first appears as an avid Sailor Moon collector before Saejima recruits him for the "New Kamakura Combi" following Kamata's departure. His unusual family consists of five identical siblings (regardless of gender) and a remarkably youthful mother, all of whom share his distinctive features. The family's supposed father presents a stark physical contrast, making his paternity biologically implausible. When a deliveryman arrives bearing an uncanny resemblance to Kiwamezawa, Saejima pieces together the truth about the family's origins, though the Kiwamezawas themselves remain unaware. He later appears visiting Saejima during his hospitalization after another pencil-related incident.
Ashura Sakaki (榊阿修羅, Sakaki Ashura)
Sakaki, a Hokkaido transfer student nicknamed "General of the North", boasts incredible pain tolerance inherited from his boxer father. After falsely claiming to defeat Onizuka and Tsukai, his own schoolmates turn on him when they expose his lies—though Katsuyuki stabs him anyway. He later reappears as an outcast student during the Atsuki Yagyou incident, tolerated only by an annoyed Saejima.
Kaoru Kamata (鎌田薫, Kamata Kaoru)
Kaoru, Jun Kamata's younger sibling, first appears at an Oni-Baku gathering where Jun protectively shields "her" from the others. Eikichi becomes infatuated, ignoring Itou and sparking a fight with Tsukai—until revealing Kaoru is actually male. The charade continues as Kaoru still crossdresses around an oblivious Onizuka.
Hazuki Misato (葉月ミサト, Misato Hazuki)
Misato Hazuki first encounters Eikichi at a karaoke bar, where she pities him after girls trick him into paying their bill. Their spontaneous night together—singing, city-gazing at his favorite park, and an aborted hotel encounter—marks Eikichi's near-first sexual experience, which he nervously cancels despite her willingness. When she later appears at his home cooking dinner, their relationship blossoms until shocking revelations emerge: she recognizes Takezawa as her former gang leader, then confesses to Eikichi she was formerly male. On her departure day, Eikichi arrives at the station too late as her train leaves, their bittersweet connection ending with mutual unspoken understanding.
Kenkichi Hino (火野剣吉, Hino Kenkichi)
Hino, Ryuji's junior high kohai from his previous school, harbors a fierce grudge against Katsuyuki over an eyebrow scar. Their feud nearly divides the Oni-Baku until Tsukai violently intervenes during a beach confrontation—though Ryuji and Eikichi reconcile beforehand. After DOA's Joey assaults Hino for posting Oni-Baku stickers in their territory, Ryuji defends him by dismantling twenty gang members. He remains loyal to Ryuji during the final conflict.
Saya Minazuki (水無月沙也, Minazuki Saya)
Saya leads the Enbutou female biker gang within the Blue Rose alliance. She first encounters Eikichi during a police evasion, later crossing paths again where she clashes with Shinomi over romantic tensions. During the climactic rooftop battle, she remains among the few who pay final respects to the Oni-Baku.
Nozomi Takagi (Takagi Nozomi)
A Hatsuchuu Middle School third-year who develops an obsessive crush on Ryuji, creating elaborate scrapbooks of his photos while her friends fawn over Eikichi. Defying her brother's warnings about Tsujikou's poor reputation, she pursues admission solely to be near Ryuji. Their brief encounter at a pachinko parlor—where Ryuji helps her win before quietly departing—and subsequent observation of the Oni-Baku's childish behavior shatters her romantic illusions. The story concludes ironically as she gains admission to Tsujikou just as her infatuation fades.
Manabu Midouji (魅堂寺学, Midōji Manabu)
Midouji, a veteran member of the Bousou Tenshi/Midnight Angels, emerges during the gang's final conflict with a cadre of senior members—much to Akutsu's surprise. He observes Onizuka's decisive battle with Akutsu and witnesses the race's conclusion when Akutsu is hospitalized. Midouji later participates in the climactic rooftop confrontation and pays his respects afterward.
Machiruda (待留田)
Machiruda, a former Speed motorcycle gang member, shares history with Eikichi's family—the Onizukas having led the gang's first generation. Though previously unseen, he aids Eikichi during the DOA conflict. Now retired from gang life, he co-owns the Speed-themed café with partner Misako.
Misako (みさ子)
A former Speed motorcycle gang member who once carried an intimidating presence but now co-owns the Speed café with Machiruda. Her demeanor has softened considerably, and she appears thoroughly relaxed and good-natured in her current life.
Kiyoma (清間)
Kyoma arrives with a fearsome reputation for "Chōnōryoku" (超能力) psychic powers, singlehandedly intimidating Harumurata and Samehara when they confront Tsujikou students. The would-be attackers flee upon his arrival—only for everyone to discover his "powers" merely consist of lifting skirts and popping coat buttons, much to Saejima's exasperation.
Akira Saijou (西條あきら, Saijō Akira)
A classmate of Nagisa's who proposes marriage despite her relationship with Ryuji. When Nagisa feels neglected by Ryuji's casual attitude, she rejects Saijou but accepts a date. Though Ryuji secretly observes them, Nagisa ultimately declines Saijou's offer to move to Tokyo, affirming her contentment with Ryuji—prompting him to become more attentive. Saijou demonstrates impressive karate skills, seen shattering breeze blocks at his dojo.
Kyosuke Masaki (真樹 京介, Masaki Kyousuke)
The first leader of the Midnight Angels who remains an idol to Eikichi and Ryuji even after his fatal racing accident. The iconic jacket he wore—unique among gang members—passes to Onizuka, who ultimately cremates it in tribute during the series finale. His legacy endures in GTO, where he appears in Onizuka's vision, inspiring him to become Japan's greatest teacher.

== Media ==
=== Manga ===
Written and illustrated by Tōru Fujisawa, Shonan Junai Gumi was serialized in Kodansha's shōnen manga magazine Weekly Shōnen Magazine from October 10, 1990, to October 2, 1996. Kodansha collected its chapters in 31 tankōbon volumes, published from March 16, 1991, to December 13, 1996. Kodansha republished the series in 15 bunkoban volumes from May 12 to December 9, 2005.

In North America, the series was licensed by Tokyopop in 2005. The version released by Tokyopop was the fifteen-volumes deluxe edition by Kodansha. The first volume was released on June 13, 2006, and the series was discontinued after the tenth volume, published on February 9, 2009. In May 2011, Vertical announced the license for the series. Vertical release started with the eleventh volume, published on February 21, 2012, and concluded with the fifteenth, published on October 30 of that same year.

A sequel spin-off written by Fujisawa and illustrated by Shinsuke Takahashi, titled Shonan Seven, was published in Akita Shoten's Monthly Shōnen Champion from January 6, 2014, to July 6, 2019. Akita Shoten collected its chapters in 17 tankōbon volumes, published from June 6, 2014, to September 6, 2019.

=== Original video animation ===
An original video animation (OVA) series was produced by J.C. Staff. The series has never been released on DVD.

==== Episode list ====
| Ep. # | Title | Length | Release date |
|---|---|---|---|
| 1 | Shonan Junai Gumi! Down the Delinquent Highway! (湘南純愛組!: 高速道路の犯人の下！) | 51 minutes | January 21, 1994 |
| 2 | Shonan Junai Gumi! 2 (湘南純愛組!2) | 48 minutes | September 23, 1994 |
| 3 | Shonan Junai Gumi! 3 Runaway Angel of Hell (湘南純愛組!3 地獄の暴走天使) | 44 minutes | June 23, 1995 |
| 4 | Shonan Junai Gumi! 4 Hunting Death (湘南純愛組!4 死神狩り) | 44 minutes | May 24, 1996 |
| 5 | Shonan Junai Gumi! 5 Forever Onibaku (湘南純愛組!5 鬼爆よ永遠に) | 44 minutes | January 24, 1997 |

=== Drama ===
A five-episode adaptation was made between 1995 and 1997, starring Naoki Miyashita as Onizuka and Yoshiyuki Yamaguchi as Ryuji.

An eight-episode live-action web drama adaptation starring Kanichiro as Onizuka and Daichi Kaneko as Ryuji was released on Amazon Prime Video in Japan on February 28, 2020.

== Reception ==
By January 2020, the manga had over 45 million copies in circulation.
