= Tōru Fujisawa =

Japanese manga artist

- Born: Hokkaido, Japan
- Occupation: Manga artist
- Employer: Kodansha
- Known for: Great Teacher Onizuka
- Spouse: Ayano Fujisawa
- Website: http://ameblo.jp/toofu001

Tōru Fujisawa (藤沢 とおる, Fujisawa Tōru; born 1967) is a Japanese manga artist. His name is romanized as Tohru Fujisawa on the Tokyopop English-language Great Teacher Onizuka books and as Toru Fujisawa on the Kodansha bilingual releases. His first serialized work was Adesugata Junjo Boy, published from 1989 in Weekly Shōnen Magazine. Fujisawa's best-known work is Great Teacher Onizuka (GTO) about a biker, Eikichi Onizuka, and his attempt to become and remain a teacher. It is a sequel to Shōnan Jun'ai Gumi! and its side story Bad Company. In 1998, Fujisawa won the Kodansha Manga Award for Great Teacher Onizuka.

== Personal ==
Fujisawa was born and raised in Hokkaido and started drawing as a child. Fujisawa originally wanted to be in animation but decided manga would give him more freedom. He based Shonan Junai Gumi at a seaside location after growing up inland. At the age of 17, he moved to Tokyo by himself to become a manga artist. He wrote science fiction Dōjinshi and submitted them to publishers. He is a fan of Initial D and was inspired by Akira. He is also a fan of the beat 'em up video game Spartan X (Kung-Fu Master).

In 2010, he married actress Ayano Sugiyama.

== Works ==
- Love You (1989, Magazine Fresh!, Kodansha)
- Adesugata Junjo Boy (艶姿純情 Boy, 1989, Weekly Shōnen Magazine, Kodansha)
- Shonan Junai Gumi (湘南純愛組!, 1990–1996, Weekly Shōnen Magazine, Kodansha)
- Bad Company (1996, Weekly Shōnen Magazine, Kodansha)
- Great Teacher Onizuka (1997–2002, Weekly Shōnen Magazine, Kodansha)
- Rose Hip Rose (2002–2003, Young Magazine Uppers, Kodansha)
- Wild Base Ballers (2003, Weekly Shōnen Magazine, Kodansha. Artwork by Taroh Sekiguchi)
- Himitsu Sentai Momoider (ひみつ戦隊モモイダー, 2003/2006–2007, Weekly Young Jump, Young Jump Extra Edition Mankaku, Shueisha)
- Tokko (2003–2004, Monthly Afternoon, Kodansha)
- Rose Hip Zero (2005–2006, Weekly Shōnen Magazine, Kodansha)
- Magnum Rose Hip (2006, Weekly Shōnen Magazine, Kodansha)
- Kamen Teacher (仮面ティーチャー, 2006–2007, Weekly Young Jump, Shueisha)
- Reverend D (2006–2007/2008/2009, Monthly Comic REX, Ichijinsha)
- Animal Joe (アニマルJOE, 2006/2008, Big Comic Spirits, Shogakukan)
- Unhappy! (あんハピっ!, 2008, Comic Charge, Kadokawa)
- Tooi Hoshi kara Kita ALICE (遠い星から来たALICE, 2008, Big Comic Spirits, Shogakukan)
- GTO: 14 Days in Shonan (2009–2011, Weekly Shōnen Magazine, Kodansha)
- Repoman Soul! (レポマン魂！, 2010, Weekly Young Jump, Shueisha)
- Soul Reviver (ソウルリヴァイヴァー, 2011–2014, Monthly Hero's, Hero's Inc.)
- Ino-Head Gargoyle (井の頭ガーゴイル, 2012–2014, Weekly Young Magazine, Kodansha)
- GT-R - Great Transporter Ryuji (2012, Weekly Shōnen Magazine, Kodansha)
- Kamen Teacher BLACK (2013–2014, Weekly Young Jump, Shueisha)
- GTO: Paradise Lost (2014–2024, Weekly Young Magazine, Kodansha)
- Oishii Kamishama (2014–2015, Weekly Shōnen Sunday, Shogakukan)
- Soul Reviver South (ソウルリヴァイヴァー SOUTH, 2014–2016, Monthly Hero's Hero's Inc.)
