= Great Teacher Onizuka =

Japanese manga series

- First tankōbon volume cover, featuring Eikichi Onizuka
- Genre: Action; Comedy; Yankī
- Manga
- Written by: Tōru Fujisawa
- Published by: Kodansha
- English publisher: NA: Tokyopop (former); Kodansha USA (current, digital)
- Imprint: Shōnen Magazine Comics
- Magazine: Weekly Shōnen Magazine
- Original run: January 8, 1997 – February 13, 2002
- Volumes: 25
Further information
Television drama
Directed by	Hiroshi Akabane; Satoru Nakajima
Written by	Kazuhiko Yukawa
Studio	Fuji Television; Avec Company
Original network	FNS (Fuji TV)
Original run	July 7, 1998 – September 22, 1998
Episodes	12 + 1 special
Anime television series
Directed by	Noriyuki Abe
Produced by	Ken Hagino; Katsunori Narumo; Madoka Takiyama (1–10); Yoshihiro Suzuki (11–28); Yuriko Nakamura (29–43)
Written by	Masashi Sogo
Music by	Yusuke Honma
Studio	Studio Pierrot
Licensed by	AUS: Madman Entertainment; NA: Discotek Media
Original network	FNS (Fuji TV)
English network	NA: SHONext; Anime Selects on Demand; SEA: Animax Asia
Original run	June 30, 1999 – September 17, 2000
Episodes	43
Live-action film
Directed by	Masayuki Suzuki
Released	December 1999
Runtime	140 minutes
Television drama
Directed by	Imai Kazuhisa
Produced by	Kasai Hideyuki; Yamamoto Yoshihiko
Written by	Masaki Fukuzawa
Music by	Haneoka Kei
Studio	Kansai Telecasting Corporation; Media Mix Japan
Original network	FNS (KTV)
Original run	July 3, 2012 – September 11, 2012
Episodes	11 + 3 specials
Television drama
GTO Taiwan
Directed by	Imai Kazuhisa
Written by	Junpei Yamaoka
Music by	Haneoka Kei
Studio	Kansai Telecasting Corporation
Original network	GTV Variety Show (Taiwan); FNS (KTV); (Japan)
Original run	March 22, 2014 – April 12, 2014
Episodes	4
Television drama
Directed by	Ken Iizuka
Studio	Kansai Telecasting Corporation
Original network	FNS (KTV)
Original run	July 8, 2014 – September 16, 2014
Episodes	11
Manga
GTU: Ikari no Death Yamada
Written by	Tōru Fujisawa
Published by	Hero's Inc.
Magazine	Comiplex
Original run	October 18, 2024 – January 16, 2026
Volumes	2
- Preceded by
- Shonan Junai Gumi (1990–1996); Bad Company (1996)
- Followed by
- GTO: 14 Days in Shonan (2009–2011); GTO: Paradise Lost (2014–2024)
- icon

Great Teacher Onizuka, abbreviated as GTO, is a Japanese manga series written and illustrated by Tōru Fujisawa. It was originally serialized in Kodansha's shōnen manga magazine Weekly Shōnen Magazine from January 1997 to February 2002, with its chapters collected in 25 tankōbon volumes. The story focuses on 22-year-old ex-bōsōzoku member Eikichi Onizuka, who becomes a teacher at a private middle school, Holy Forest Academy, in Tokyo, Japan. It is a standalone sequel to Fujisawa's earlier manga series Shonan Junai Gumi and Bad Company, both of which focus on Onizuka's life before becoming a teacher.

Due to the popularity of the manga, several adaptations of GTO were created, including a 12-episode Japanese television drama running from July to September 1998; a 1999 live-action film directed by Masayuki Suzuki, and a 43-episode anime television series produced by Studio Pierrot, which aired on Fuji TV from June 1999 to September 2000. A second live-action series aired in Japan during 2012, and two more in 2014.

A sequel manga series, titled GTO: 14 Days in Shonan, ran in Weekly Shōnen Magazine from June 2009 to September 2011. Another sequel, titled GTO: Paradise Lost, ran in Weekly Young Magazine and later Magazine Pocket from April 2014 to October 2024. Both the anime and manga were licensed in North America by Tokyopop. The anime series was re-released by Discotek Media in 2013, and the manga by Kodansha USA in 2022.

The manga has had over 50 million copies in circulation, making it one of the best-selling manga series in history. In 1998, Great Teacher Onizuka won the 22nd Kodansha Manga Award in the shōnen category.

== Plot ==
Eikichi Onizuka is a 22-year-old ex-gang member who wants to lose his virginity. While peeping up girls' skirts at a local shopping mall, Onizuka meets a schoolgirl who agrees to go out on a date with him. Onizuka's attempt to sleep with her fails when her current "boyfriend", her teacher, shows up at the love hotel they are in and asks her to return to him. The teacher is old and ugly, but has sufficient influence over her that she leaps from a second-story window and lands in his arms.

Onizuka, upon seeing this display of a teacher's power over girls, decides to become a teacher himself. He earns his teaching degree, just barely, at a second-rate college. In his quest, he develops a conscience. This means taking advantage of impressionable schoolgirls is out of the question, but their unusually attractive mothers are a different matter. He enjoys teaching and, most of the time, he teaches life lessons rather than routine schoolwork. He hates the system of traditional education, especially when other teachers and administrators have grown ignorant and condescending to students and their needs. With these realizations, he sets out to become the greatest teacher ever, using his own unique brand of philosophy and the ability to do nearly anything when under enough pressure. He is hired as a long-shot teacher by a privately operated middle school in Kichijōji to tame a class that has driven one teacher to a mysterious death, another to a nervous breakdown, and one other to join a cult. He embarks on a mission of self-discovery by reaching out to each student one by one to help them overcome their problems and learn to enjoy life. He uses methods that are unorthodox, illegal, and life-threatening, yet he manages to succeed in educating and opening up his students.

== Production ==
While writing GTO, manga author Tōru Fujisawa said that he focused on the writing style Japanese people enjoy most. He added that he was influenced by playwright Kōhei Tsuka's ability to blend touching and funny moments. The series was originally intended to run for ten volumes; however, it was extended at the request of Kodansha, the manga's publisher. Onizuka's first name, Eikichi, was taken from musician Eikichi Yazawa. When developing the character, Fujisawa sought to incorporate real traits of Japanese gang members, often referred to as yankī. Onizuka's appearance and bleached hair were modeled after these gang members, and despite some assumptions from non-Japanese readers, his intention was not to make Onizuka look foreign or American. Onizuka acts tough and confident, but he is actually shy and lacks the confidence to act on his desires. He is straightforward and stands by his reasoning and principles, and he has a strong conscience. Through the character, Fujisawa sought to convey the importance of taking responsibility for one's own actions. When facing writing block, Fujisawa would write stories without Onizuka.

Onizuka's role in the school is to provide a bridge between the students and teachers. The character of Azusa Fuyutsuki reflects the point of view of the average teacher. Fujisawa built the series on his own school experience where teachers were mostly focused only on a good performance record rather than the teaching itself. However, he was able to take an interest in mathematics because of the approach of his teacher. Manga artist Tatsuya Egawa, whom Fujisawa once served as a disciple, claimed that GTO plagiarized his debut manga, Be Free!, and mentioned that, when he met Fujisawa again, Fujisawa admitted to the plagiarism. However, Egawa said he understood because Fujisawa was his disciple.

== Media ==
=== Manga ===
Written and illustrated by Tōru Fujisawa, Great Teacher Onizuka was serialized in Kodansha's shōnen manga magazine Weekly Shōnen Magazine from January 8, 1997, to February 13, 2002. Kodansha collected its 200 individual chapters in 25 tankōbon volumes, released from May 16, 1997, to April 17, 2002.

The series was licensed in English by Tokyopop and was one of Tokyopop's first releases in the "Authentic Manga" lineup of titles using the Japanese right-to-left reading style. In doing so the artwork remained unchanged from the original compared to previous publishing methods. The 25 volumes were published between April 23, 2002, and August 9, 2005. Kodansha USA republished the series digitally on February 2, 2022.

==== Sequels and spin-offs ====
A side story series, titled GTO: 14 Days in Shonan, was serialized in Weekly Shōnen Magazine from June 10, 2009, to September 14, 2011.

A three-chapter spin-off, titled Black Diamond, was later published in Weekly Shōnen Magazine in November 2011.

A spin-off manga, titled GT-R, focused on Onizuka's friend Ryūji Danma, was published in Weekly Shōnen Magazine from June 27 to October 3, 2012. Kodansha collected its chapters in a single tankōbon volume, released on November 16, 2012.

A sequel, titled GTO: Paradise Lost, was serialized in Kodansha's seinen manga magazine Weekly Young Magazine from April 14, 2014, to February 14, 2023, and later ran on the publisher's Magazine Pocket digital platform, under the title GTO: Paradise Lost Kai, from April 1 to October 15, 2024.

A spin-off, titled GTU: Ikari no Death Yamada (GTU -怒りのDEATH山田-; 'Great Teacher Uchiyamada: Fury of Death Yamada'), was serialized on Hero's Inc.'s Comiplex website from October 18, 2024, to January 16, 2026. Hero's collected its chapters in three tankōbon volumes, released from April 4, 2025, to March 5, 2026.

=== Anime ===
A 43-episode anime television series adaptation, produced by Studio Pierrot, directed by Noriyuki Abe, and with series composition by Masashi Sogo, was broadcast on Fuji TV from June 30, 1999, to September 24, 2000. Yoshiyuki Suga provided scripts, having also written scripts for the live-action adaptation.

Tokyopop licensed the series for release in North America and released it across 10 DVDs between March 22, 2002, and September 16, 2003, and for American TV broadcast on Showtime's SHONext channel in 2004 and Comcast's Anime Selects on Demand network in 2006. The series was re-released in a seven-disc box set by Discotek Media on September 24, 2013. Crunchyroll began streaming the series in January 2015. Netflix began streaming the series in April 2024.

=== Live-action ===
==== Starring Takashi Sorimachi ====
A 12-episode television drama (titled GTO: Great Teacher Onizuka) adaptation starring Takashi Sorimachi as the titular 22 years old character was broadcast on Fuji TV from July 7 to September 22, 1998. Some of the manga's more violent and smutty elements were toned down in the TV drama. Changes were also made to the character of Fuyutsuki (Nanako Matsushima) who disliked Onizuka early on in the drama and had wanted to leave teaching to become an Air Hostess (contrasting her depiction as an eager teacher who supported Onizuka throughout the manga). A television special titled GTO: Drama Special was broadcast on June 29, 1999. It was followed by a theatrical movie, GTO: The Movie, premiered in January 2000. The movie was released in North America by Media Blasters, under their Tokyo Shock division, on July 26, 2005. The theme song for the original series is "Poison: Iitai Koto mo Ienai Konna Yo no Naka wa" (POISON ～言いたい事も言えないこんな世の中は～; lit. 'Poison: In a World Like This, Where I Can't Even Say What I Want to Say'), performed by Sorimachi.

A special sequel project titled GTO Revival, set 22 years after the original TV series, with the title character reprised by Sorimachi, was announced to air in 2024, as part of Fuji TV's 65th anniversary. Takashi Sorimachi reprised his role as Onizuka, now a 49 years old teacher. The cast of third-year students and teacher team of Sotoku Gakuin High School, where this version takes place, includes Sae Okazaki (as Miyu Ayahara, a third-year homeroom and Japanese History teacher), Shinya Kote (as Takeshi Fujida, the vice-principal), Rikako Yagi (as Suzuka Ichikawa, an honor student, with a strained relationship with her father), Mei Hata (as Rin Endo, a student whose father's company's fraud problem was exposed), Wataru Hyuga (as Haruto Uno, a student on a baseball scholarship, unable to play because of an injury, whose father despises him for this), and Kosuke Suzuki (as Koichi Ichikawa, Suzuka's father and a candidate for the House of Representatives). It premiered on April 1, 2024. Seven cast members from the original series reprised their roles in this version: Hiroyuki Ikeuchi as Kunio Murai, Yuta Yamazaki as Masaru Watanabe, Yōsuke Kubozuka as Yoshito Kikuchi, Hidenori Tokuyama as Kenji Youda, Shun Oguri as Noboru Yoshikawa, Naohito Fujiki as Ryuji Saejima, and Nanako Matsushima as Azusa Fuyutsuki. For the 2024 revival version, a new version of "Poison" was performed by Sorimachi with Blue Encount.

Following the success of GTO Revival, a brand new television drama was announced in 2026, with Sorimachi reprising his role as Eikichi Onizuka, now aged 52. Titled GTO 2026, the series aired on Kansai TV, Fuji TV, and affiliated channels from July 20 to September 28, 2026; the series has also been streamed on Netflix. "Poison" by Sorimachi, from the 1998 series, is used again as the theme song for the 2026 series. The drama also featured the return of Hiroyuki Ikeuchi as Kunio Murai, Yuta Yamazaki as Masaru Watanabe and Nanako Matsushima as Azusa Fuyutsuki. There was also a cameo by Yōsuke Kubozuka as Yoshito Kikuchi, Hidenori Tokuyama as Kenji Youda and Shun Oguri as Noboru Yoshikawa in the final episode.

==== Starring Akira ====
During 2012, it was announced that a new live-action remake series would be broadcast in Japan. Produced by Kansai TV and Media Mix Japan, the series ran from July 3 to September 11, 2012. Originally, Jin Akanishi was to play the role of Onizuka; however, he was forced to withdraw by his management. Instead, Akira of Japanese band Exile was selected to play Onizuka.

An Autumn special, titled GTO: Autumn Demon Rampage Special (GTO 秋も鬼暴れスペシャル), was broadcast on October 2, 2012. It is a two-hour television special featuring Onizuka defending a local orphanage from a corrupt politician. It also introduces the character of Shimomi Fujisawa from the manga prequels.

A holiday special aired on January 2, 2013. It features Onizuka dealing with a student who got mixed up with a dangerous underground scouting agency.

A special episode, titled GTO Final Chapter: Farewell Onizuka, Graduation Special, aired on April 2, 2013. It serves as a conclusive ending for the 2012 series.

On March 22, 2014, a four-part mini-series aired in Taiwan on GTV Variety Show, before being broadcast in Japan at a later date. Titled GTO Taiwan, the series places Onizuka in a Taiwanese school as part of a training program. It is a Japan/Taiwan co-production containing both Japanese and Mandarin Chinese dialogue. The series was streamead in Japanese with English subtitles on Crunchyroll.

A second season aired from July 8 to September 16, 2014. Onizuka is transferred to a completely new school, Meisai Academy's Shonan branch, adapting story arcs from the GTO: 14 Days in Shonan manga sequel.

== Reception ==
By November 2007, the manga had over 50 million copies in circulation. Great Teacher Onizuka won the 22nd Kodansha Manga Award for the shōnen category in 1998.

In Manga: The Complete Guide, Jason Thompson referred to the manga as "shameless, frequently sexist and totally hilarious". He gave it four stars out of four, praising its imagery, detailed art, and "smutty, pop culture-laden dialogue". He added that in its best moments, the manga "goes beyond the level of an Adam Sandler movie and approaches true social satire".

The 1998 live-action series had an average audience share of 28.5% with the final episode recording a rate of 35.7%. The final episode was the eighth-most-watched broadcast in the Kantō region during 1998. The 2000 live-action film sequel grossed ¥1.32 billion at the box office, becoming the tenth-highest-grossing film of the year.

In The Anime Encyclopedia: A Guide to Japanese Animation Since 1917, Jonathan Clements and Helen McCarthy noted the anime's use of computer graphics for cloud and water effects to cover up "the cheap TV animation". They called the 1998 live-action adaptation "the quintessential GTO, with its handsome loner [protagonist] fighting injustices on his motorcycle like an educational lawman" but still found the anime adaptation to have "considerable bite" due to its animated origins allowing for "slightly more violence and menace than its prime-time live-action counterpart."

In 2008, Russian network 2x2 came under investigation by Rossvyazkomnadzor, the government watchdog, for allegedly promoting "child pornography, sexual aberrations, violence and cruelty" by broadcasting the GTO anime.
