= Macross Fb7 Listen to My Song! =

- Directed by: Tetsurō Amino
- Screenplay by: Tetsurō Amino
- Story by: Shōji Kawamori
- Edited by: Tetsurō Amino
- Production company: Satelight
- Release date: 20 October 2012 (Japan)
- Running time: 90 minutes
- Country: Japan
- Language: Japanese

Macross Fb7 Listen to My Song! (Japanese: マクロスFB7 銀河流魂 オレノウタヲキケ！, Hepburn: Macross FB7 Ore no Uta o Kike!) is a 2012 Japanese anime film directed by Tetsurō Amino and set in the Macross universe.

== Plot ==
Macross Fb7 is a movie adaptation of Macross 7, using the framing device of the main cast of Macross Frontier studying the mysterious lack of new songs from Fire Bomber in over a decade, via a set of tapes that are delivered through mysterious means.

== Voice cast ==
=== Macross Frontier ===
- Katsuyuki Konishi as Ozma Lee
- Megumi Nakajima as Ranka Lee
- Aya Endo as Sheryl Nome
- May'n as Sheryl Nome (singing voice)
- Kenta Miyake as Bobby Margot
- Jun Fukuyama as Luca Angeloni
- Hiroshi Kamiya as Mikhail Blanc
- Megumi Toyoguchi as Klan Klang
- Houko Kuwashima as Canaria Berstein
- Akio Suyama as Gavil

== International release ==
Due to a current legal dispute over the distribution rights of the Macross franchise, involving Studio Nue and Big West against Harmony Gold, much of the Macross merchandise post 1999, including Macross Fb7, had not received an international release.

However, on 1 March 2021, Big West, Studio Nue and Harmony Gold reached an agreement on the international distribution of most Macross sequels and films.
