= Hidetaka =

- Gender: Male

Origin
- Origin: Japanese
- Meaning: Different meanings depending on the kanji used

Hidetaka (written: 秀孝, 秀貴, 秀隆, 英孝, 英貴, 英峻, 英学, or 英高) is a masculine Japanese given name. Notable people with the name include:

- Hidetaka Kanazono (金園 英学; born 1988), Japanese footballer
- Kawajiri Hidetaka (河尻 秀隆; 1527–1582), Japanese samurai
- Hidetaka Miyazaki (宮崎 英高), Japanese video game director
- Hidetaka Monma (門馬 秀貴; born 1973), Japanese mixed martial artist
- Hidetaka Nishiyama (西山 英峻; 1928–2008), Japanese karateka
- Oda Hidetaka (織田 秀孝; died 1555), Japanese samurai
- Hidetaka Suehiro (末広 秀孝; born 1973), Japanese video game designer
- Hidetaka Tenjin (天神 英貴; born 1973), Japanese illustrator
- Hidetaka Yamada (山田 英孝; born 1976), Japanese badminton player
- Hidetaka Yoshioka (吉岡 秀隆; born 1970), Japanese actor
