= Macross The Ride =

Japanese light novel series

- First volume cover of Macross the Ride

マクロス・ザ・ライド (Makurosu Za Raido)
- Genre: Air racing Romance; Space opera Military science fiction Mecha
- Light novel
- Written by: Ukyō Kodachi
- Illustrated by: Hidetaka Tenjin; Tommy Otsuka; Katsumi Enami
- Published by: ASCII Media Works
- Imprint: Dengeki Hobby Books
- Magazine: Dengeki Hobby Magazine
- Original run: December 24, 2010 – November 24, 2011
- Volumes: 2

Macross The Ride or Macross R is a light novel series published in the Dengeki Hobby Magazine, a Japanese model kit magazine. It is based on the Macross sci-fi mecha series. It was serialized from December 2010 until November 2011.

== Synopsis ==
The light novel is set in an air race competition performed using advanced civilian "valkyries" (variable fighters) in the massive space emigration colony ship Macross Frontier in the year 2058 A.D., one year before the events of the Macross Frontier anime television series. Many designs from the different Macross series also appear in this novel.

== Production ==
Original Macross creator and mecha designer Shoji Kawamori performed editorial supervision of the novel. Ukyō Kodachi, who was in charge of the novelization of Macross Frontier, wrote the new novel series. Famous mecha illustrator Hidetaka Tenjin created graphic art adapted from Varchi Lee's new variable fighter model kit designs. Muneharu designed the color schemes of the new variable fighters and other mecha shown in the magazine. The character designer for the new novel series was Katsumi Enami. Tommy Otsuka was in charge of the illustration of the web adaptation of the novel.

The new models of plastic model kits shown in the hobby magazine were sponsored and manufactured by Hasegawa and Bandai. Garage kits were converted and customized for the new plastic model designs and were manufactured from scratch for the hobby magazine. Dengeki published submitted fan-based garage kits of various variable fighters.

A book summarizing the light novel episodes was published on June 25, 2011. Also a visual book with photos of the new models published in the magazine was released with the novel.

A limited sale kit of the VF-11D "Thunderfocus" variable fighter which appeared in the light novel was produced as a plastic model kit from Hasegawa in December 2011.

== Episodes ==
1. "Deep Space Warbird"
2. "Up, up and Away"
3. "Spiral Blue"
4. "City Fight Step"
5. "Virtual Sky"
6. "Iron Maiden"
7. "Past Days Attacker"
8. "Combat Open"
9. "Piece Children"
10. "Fascas"
11. "Try Again"
12. "Final Rap"
