= Macross Delta =

2016 science fiction anime television series

- Macross Delta poster

マクロスΔ(デルタ) (Makurosu Deruta)
- Genre: Mecha; Military science fiction Romance; Musical
- Created by: Studio Nue; Shōji Kawamori
- Anime television film

Mission 0.89: Battlefield Prologue
- Directed by: Shōji Kawamori (chief director); Kenji Yasuda
- Studio: Satelight
- Original network: Tokyo MX, BS11
- Released: December 31, 2015
- Runtime: 26 minutes
- Anime television series
- Directed by: Shōji Kawamori (chief director); Kenji Yasuda
- Written by: Toshizo Nemoto
- Music by: Saeko Suzuki; TOMISIRO; Mina Kubota
- Studio: Satelight
- Licensed by: Big West (licensing) Disney Platform Distribution (worldwide streaming license); NA: Anime Limited (home video); UK: Anime Limited (home video)
- Original network: Tokyo MX, TVQ, BS11, MBS, TVA, TVh
- Original run: April 3, 2016 – September 25, 2016
- Episodes: 26
- Video game

Macross Delta Scramble
- Developer: Artdink
- Publisher: Bandai Namco Entertainment
- Genre: Shooter
- Platform: PlayStation Vita
- Released: October 20, 2016
- Anime film

Macross Delta: Passionate Walküre
- Directed by: Shōji Kawamori
- Produced by: Shinichi Hirai; Fumio Kaneko; Bungo Kondou
- Written by: Shōji Kawamori; Toshizo Nemoto
- Music by: Saeko Suzuki; TOMISIRO; Mina Kubota
- Studio: Satelight
- Licensed by: Big West (licensing) Disney Platform Distribution (worldwide streaming license); NA: Anime Limited (home video); UK: Anime Limited (home video)
- Released: February 9, 2018
- Runtime: 120 minutes
- Anime film

Macross Delta: Zettai Live!!!!!!
- Directed by: Shōji Kawamori
- Produced by: Shinichi Hirai; Yuuichi Hatanaka
- Written by: Toshizo Nemoto
- Music by: Saeko Suzuki; TOMISIRO; Mina Kubota
- Studio: Satelight
- Licensed by: Big West (licensing) Disney Platform Distribution (worldwide streaming license); NA: Anime Limited (home video); UK: Anime Limited (home video)
- Released: October 8, 2021
- Runtime: 124 minutes
- icon

Macross Delta, stylized as Macross Δ (Japanese: マクロスΔ(デルタ), Hepburn: Makurosu Deruta) is a science fiction anime television series that aired on Tokyo MX in Japan from April 3, 2016, to September 25, 2016. The fourth television series set in the Macross universe, it is directed by Kenji Yasuda and written by Toshizo Nemoto with Shōji Kawamori being the chief director and mechanical designer, with Chisato Mita (Capcom) handling the original character design. Kawamori is also credited as the original creator along Studio Nue.

== Summary ==
Macross Delta is set in the year 2067, eight years after the events of Macross Frontier in a remote part of the Milky Way Galaxy called the Brísingr Globular Cluster (ブリージンガル球状星団, Burījingaru Kyūjō Seidan), which is plagued by the Vár Syndrome (ヴァールシンドローム, Vāru Shindorōmu), a mysterious phenomenon which turns people berserk without any apparent cause. A team of talented idols, the Walküre, uses the power of their songs to calm down the infected by the Vár Syndrome, assisted by the Delta Flight, a team of experienced Valkyrie pilots, while facing the interference from the Aerial Knights of the Windermere Kingdom, which found a way to exploit the infection in their favor as part of their plan to resume war against the New United Government (新統合政府, Shin Tōgō-seifu) for control of the Cluster.

== Production ==
The series was sponsored by Big West Advertising and Bandai Visual. As with the previous Macross series, the Macross Delta staff have scouted new talent for the anime. Auditions began on December 1, 2014. On February 7, 2015, it was reported that over 8,000 people auditioned to star in the new series. The final selection round was held in Tokyo in late April 2015. The finalists went through interviews with the judges, and demonstrated their singing and voice performing skills.

Macross Delta held a "'Chō Jikū' Seisaku Happyōkai" ("The Super Dimension" Production Unveiling), a live-streamed event that revealed more details on the project on October 29 at 12:00 p.m. Kawamori appeared at the event to reveal the main staff, the winner of the audition for the new singer in the anime, and the new anime's characters.

=== Promotional media ===
A promotional visual created by artist Hidetaka Tenjin an depicting 2 fictional dogfighting aircraft was posted in the franchise's official website on Friday the 25th September 2015. Kawamori confirmed that both fighters in the visual are "Valkyries" (transforming variable fighters), and he specifically cited the old Swedish jet fighter Saab 35 Draken as an inspiration for the darker Valkyrie in the background of the image. Kawamori added that he has been a fan of the Draken jet since he was a child. He also acknowledged that the blue and white Valkyrie in the foreground shares a design lineage with previous variable fighters in the Macross series and therefore was less of a challenge to design. By contrast, the background variable fighter will feature a relatively new transformation scheme that bears little similarity to those of previous Valkyries.

Shoji Kawamori explained that the two fighters have exhausts in different colors because they were developed by different companies. He also noted that he has been deliberately avoiding more direct design inspirations from current real world fighters, since stealth technology has made modern combat aircraft look too similar and harder to distinguish from each other. Kawamori added that this new series will emphasize "Valkyrie versus Valkyrie" duels as opposed to previous television series. While video productions such as Macross Plus and Macross Zero prominently featured variable fighters against each other, Kawamori admitted that it has not been the focus in a Macross television series in a long time.

The staff also presented the official designs by Shōji Kawamori for the two main variable fighters: the VF-31 Siegfried and the Sv-262 Draken III. The VF-31 is flown by the Walküre group's escorts, the "Delta Flight". Kawamori confirmed that the VF-31 is an update of the YF-30 Chronos that appeared in the PlayStation 3 video game Macross 30: Voices across the Galaxy. However, unlike the YF-30 the VF-31 design has built-in gunpods in its arms and forward-swept wings.

The Sv-262 is used by the Aerial Knights Valkyrie Aerial Knights of the Windermere Kingdom. The new variable fighter design was inspired by the real-life Saab 35 Draken. While describing the Sv-262, Kawamori mentioned that this is the first time that a Valkyrie with this unique delta wing design variant has appeared in Macross. Hidetaka Tenjin also noted that unlike other Valkyries its cockpit is not transparent.

=== New series logo ===
The Macross Delta logo features a planet within the Japanese characters that form the word "Macross". Shoji Kawamori specifically noted that this planet is the main setting for the new series. He also explained that this was made deliberately in direct contrast with Macross Frontier, whose setting was primarily in space. Kawamori started to describe more details about Macross Delta's setting but stopped short and asked fans to watch "The Super Dimension" Production Unveiling event.

Kawamori pointed out that the delta symbol in the logo is made of triangular symbols to symbolize the three main thematic elements of Macross: music, a love triangle, and Valkyries. However, he also noted that the two symbols are split, and explained that this is indicative that the three elements will not come together as expected in the new story.

=== The Super Dimension Production Unveiling ===
18-year old Minori Suzuki from Aichi Prefecture was announced as the winner of the newest Macross singer auditions. Suzuki plays Freyja Wion, an aspiring idol who is full of spirit and who is always smiling. Other characters include five girls that form the "Tactical Sound Unit Walküre", the first major songstress group in the Macross anime franchise. (Macross 7 had the "Jamming Birds" group, and the PlayStation video game Macross Digital Mission VF-X had the group "Milky Dolls").

Hidetaka Tenjin is credited as the "Macross visual artist" for this series while Majiro (Barakamon, Nagareboshi Lens) and Yuu Shindo (My Teen Romantic Comedy SNAFU, Persona 4: The Golden Animation) adapted the original character designs by Chisato Mita (designer in Capcom's E.X. Troopers video game). Other non-Japanese staff members include Thomas Romain as worldview designer, Vincento Niemu as art designer, and Stanislas Brunet as mechanical designer.

Bandai also presented prototypes of the DX Chōgōkin models of both fighters.

== Media ==
=== Anime ===
A Macross Delta Preview Special was aired on Japanese television on New Year's Eve in 2015, with the all-but complete first episode.

The anime premiered on Tokyo MX and BS11, along other stations in Japan on April 3, 2016. The series used twelve musical themes: two openings and ten endings.

- Openings by Walküre:
  - Episodes 2-12 and 14: "Ichido Dake no Koi Nara" (一度だけの恋なら; lit. If I Love Only Once)
  - Episodes 15–2: "Zettai reido Θ Novatick" (絶対零度θノヴァティック; lit. Absolute Zero Novatick)
- Endings 1-14 by Walküre
  - New Year Special and episode 1: "Ikenai Borderline" (いけないボーダーライン; lit. Forbidden Borderline)
  - "Rune ga Pikatto hikarittara" (ルンがピカッと光ったら; lit. When the Rune Sparkles)
  - "Axia ~ Daisuki de caikirai ~" (AXIA〜ダイスキでダイキライ〜; lit. "Axia ~ I Love, I Hate")
  - "Giraffe Blues", and "Hametsu no junjō" (破滅の純情; lit. Ruin of Pure Heart)
- Endings 15-25 all by Walküre, except one
  - Zettai reido θ Novatick" (絶対零度θノヴァティック)"
  - "Hametsu no Junjō" (破滅の純情; lit. Ruin of Pure Heart),
  - "God Bless You", "Love! Thunder Grow"
  - "Kaze wa yokoku naku fuku" (風は予告なく吹く; lit. The Wind Blows Without Notice)
  - "Ai oboete imasu ka ~Orch2067~" (愛・おぼえていますか 〜ORCH2067〜; lit. Do You Remember Love? ~Orch2067~) by Mina Kubota.
  - Episode 26: "Zettai reido θ Novatick" (絶対零度θノヴァティック)"

The series started streaming on Disney+ in several countries & territories all around the world (via the Star hub) in 2024. The series started streaming on Hulu in the United States on January 13, 2025.

==== Movies ====
A compilation film with some plot changes, Macross Delta: Passionate Walküre, was released in Japanese theatres on February 9, 2018. On October 8, 2021, a new film, Macross Delta: Zettai Live!!!!!!, serving as a sequel to Passionate Walküre, was released in Japanese theaters.

=== Manga ===
Four manga adaptations were officially serialized, all released in June 2016. The first one was serialized in Kodansha's Monthly Shōnen Sirius. The second, titled Macross Delta Gaiden: Macross E (マクロスΔ外伝 マクロスE (エクストラ), Makurosu Deruta Gaiden Makurosu E (Ekusutora)) was written by Shoji Kawamori and serialized in Kodansha's Magazine Special. The third, Macross Delta: The Diva Who Guides the Galaxy (マクロスΔ 銀河を導く歌姫, Makurosu Deruta Ginga o Michibiku Utahime), was serialized in Ichijinsha's Monthly Comic Rex. The last, Macross Delta: The Black-Winged White Knight (マクロスΔ 黒き翼の白騎士, Makurosu Deruta Kuroki Tsubasa no Shiro Kishi), was also serialized in Monthly Comic Rex.

== Music ==
=== Singles ===
| Release date | Title | Notes |
|---|---|---|
| December 31, 2015 | "Ikenai Borderline" (いけないボーダーライン) | Digital single |
| March 21, 2016 | "Koi! Halation THE WAR" (恋！ ハレイション THE WAR) | Digital single |
| May 11, 2016 | "Ichido Dake no Koi Nara / Rune ga Pikatto Hikattara" (一度だけの恋なら / ルンがピカッと光ったら ) | |
| August 10, 2016 | "Zettai Reido θ Novatic / Hametsu no Junjou" (絶対零度θノヴァティック / 破滅の純情) | |
| February 14, 2018 | "Walküre wa Uragiranai" (ワルキューレは裏切らない) | |
| May 27, 2020 | "Mirai wa Onna no Tame ni Aru" (未来はオンナのためにある) | |

=== Albums ===
| Release date | Title | Notes |
|---|---|---|
| July 27, 2016 | Walküre Attack! | |
| September 28, 2016 | Walküre Trap! | |
| January 25, 2017 | Walküre ga Tomaranai | Mini album |
| February 14, 2018 | Walküre ga Uragiranai | Mini album |
| October 13, 2021 | Walküre Reborn! | |

=== Songs ===
| Title | Lyrics | Arrangement | Composition | Strings Arrangement | Vocals | Episode | Album |
|---|---|---|---|---|---|---|---|
| Absolute 5 | Kisuke | Takuya Watanabe | | | Walküre | 22 | Walküre Trap! |
| "AXIA~Daisuki de Daikirai~" (AXIA〜ダイスキでダイキライ〜) | Rokutsumi Sumiyo | Hideyuki Daichi Suzuki | Ryōki Matsumoto | | Kiyono Yasuno, Nao Toyama, Nozomi Nishida | 9, 10 | Walküre Attack! |
| "Aura Sala ~Hikaru Kaze~" (オーラ・サーラ〜光る風〜) | Mina Kubota | | | | Heinz (Melody Chubak) | 6, 15, 18 | |
| "Bokura no Senjō" (僕らの戦場) | Miho Karasawa; Yūsuke Katō | Yūsuke Katō | | | Walküre | 3, 4, 9, 18 | Walküre Attack! |
| "Ai Oboete Imasu ka" (愛・おぼえていますか; "Do You Remember Love?) | Kazumi Yasui | Kazuhiko Katō | | | Walküre | 25 | Walküre Trap! |
| "Fukakuteisei ☆ Cosmic Movement" (不確定性☆COSMIC MOVEMENT) | Kotomi Fukagawa; Rokutsumi Sumiyo; Akiko Watanabe; Aneta Umuya | Umuya Aneta | | Tatsuya Kurauchi | Walküre | 3, 4, 17 | Walküre Attack! |
| "Giraffe Blues" | Naho | H-Wonder | | Yūsuke Katō | Mira Larrazábal, JUNNA | 7 | |
| "Giraffe Blues" | Naho | H-Wonder | | Yūsuke Katō | Minori Suzuki | 8, 23 | Zettai Reido θ Novatic / Hametsu no Junjou (single) |
| "Giraffe Blues" | Naho | H-Wonder | | Yūsuke Katō | Walküre | 9, 11, 18 | Walküre Attack! |
| "Giraffe Blues" | Naho | H-Wonder | | Yūsuke Katō | Kiyono Yasuno | 11, 20 | Walküre ga Tomaranai |
| "Giraffe Blues" | Naho | H-Wonder | | Yūsuke Katō | JUNNA | 21 | Zettai Reido θ Novatic / Hametsu no Junjou (single) |
| "Giritick ♡ Beginner" (ジリティック♡BEGINNER) | Kotomi Futagawa | Umuya Aneta | | | Nao Toyama and Nozomi Nishida | 1, 7, 17 | Walküre Attack! |
| "Hametsu no Junjō" (破滅の純情) | Naoki Nishi | Minoru Komorita | | | JUNNA | 18 | Walküre Trap! |
| "Hametsu no Junjō" (破滅の純情) | Naoki Nishi | Minoru Komorita | | | Walküre | 14, 15, 17 | Zettai Reido θ Novatic / Hametsu no Junjou (single) |
| God Bless You | Katsutoshi Kitagawa | | | | Walküre | 16 | Walküre Trap! |
| "Hear The Universe" | Yuho Iwasato | Rasmus Faber | | | Walküre | 17 | Walküre Trap! |
| "Ichido Dake no Koi Nara" (一度だけの恋なら) | Miho Karasawa; Yūsuke Katō | Yūsuke Katō | | | Walküre | 13, 26 | Walküre Attack! |
| "Ikenai Borderline" (いけないボーダーライン) | Naoki Nishi | Minoru Komorita | | | Walküre | 1, 2, 8, 13 | Walküre Attack! |
| "Kaze wa Yokoku naku Fuku (風は予告なく吹く) | Maaya Sakamoto | Katsutoshi Kitagawa | | | Walküre | 19 | Walküre Trap! |
| "Koi! Halation The War" (恋！ ハレイション THE WAR) | Umuya Aneta; Kotomi Fukagawa | Tatsuya Kurauchi | | | Walküre | 1, 2, 4, 17 | Walküre Attack! |
| "Kurage Ondo" (クラゲ音頭) | Toshizō Nemoto | Saeko Suzuki; TOMISIRO | | Mina Kubota | Minori Suzuki, Nao Toyama, Nozomi Nishida | 10 | |
| LOVE! THUNDER GLOW | Kenzo Saeki | SiZK | SiZK; Stephen McNair | | Walküre | 18 | Walküre Trap! |
| "Namidame Bakuhatsuon" (涙目爆発音) | Kohei Dojima | Katsutoshi Kitagawa | Kohei Dojima | | Kiyono Yasuno, Nozomi Nishida, Nao Toyama | 21 | Walküre Trap! |
| "NEO STREAM" | Emi Nishida | Mirai Watanabe | | Tatsuya Kurauchi | Walküre | 8, 14 | Walküre Attack! |
| "Onyanoko ♡ Girl" (おにゃの子♡girl) | Saida Kaseki | TeddyLoid | | | Nozomi Nishida and Nao Toyama | 17 | Walküre Trap! |
| "Silent Hacker" | Saeko Suzuki; TOMOSIRO | | | | Nao Toyama, Nozomi Nishida, Kiyono Yasuno | 7 | Walküre Trap! |
| "Remember 16" | K.INOJO | Atsushi Takashi | | bamboo tree | Zack & Hack | 11 | |
| "Rune ga Pikatto Hikarittara" (ルンがピカッと光ったら) | Naoki Nishi | Minoru Komorita | | | Walküre | 5, 17 | Walküre Attack! |
| "Walküre Attack!" | UiNA | Kōtarō Odaka | Kōtarō Odaka; UiNA | | Walküre | 6, 10, 13 | Walküre Attack! |
| "Walküre no Birthday Song" (ワルキューレのバースデイソング) | Happy Field | Mina Kubota | Happy Field | | Walküre | 16 | Walküre Trap! |
| "Wind Vaasa ~Ketsui no Kaze~" (ザルド・ヴァーサ〜決意の風〜) | Mina Kubota | | | | Heinz (Melody Chubak) | 8, 10, 12, 13, 15 | |
| "Zettai Reido θ Novatic" (絶対零度θノヴァティック) | Junko Zushi; Kouichi Kawashima | Mitsunori Ikeda | Junko Zushi; Kouichi Kawashima; Mitsunori Ikeda | | Walküre | 15-25 | Walküre Trap! |

== International release ==
Due to a legal dispute over the distribution rights of the Macross franchise, involving Studio Nue and Big West against Harmony Gold, much of the Macross merchandise post 1999, including Macross Delta, has not received an international release.

However, on March 1, 2021, Big West, Studio Nue and Harmony Gold reached an agreement on the international distribution of most Macross sequels and films. In America, these series are available for streaming on Disney+ and Hulu.

== Reception ==
Richard Eisenbeis from Kotaku gives the preview episode a mixed review. He praised the episode's beginning for introducing the basic setting and shows the first meeting of Freyja, Hayate, and Mirage along with some short character building scenes for each, but criticised halfway point of the episode. Despite praising the aerial dogfight, he thinks the sudden conflict and the introduction of 15 different characters was "far too much too fast". For the music, while the first two Walkure songs are deemed forgettable, he thinks the final song used for the ending and credits, "Ikenai Borderline", is great. Richard's main problem is Walkure themselves, referring them as the elephant in the room. He commented "While their 'magic' is clearly technology-based, it is something so unexpected in a Macross anime, it's likely to throw even longtime fans for a loop—I know it did me". Nevertheless, he hopes much of the information will be sorted out by the time the series makes its true premiere this spring.

Writing for The Encyclopedia of Science Fiction, Piotr Konieczny described Macross Delta as a competent but uninspired continuation of the Macross franchise, noting that its plot and themes closely resemble those of Macross Frontier despite its chanted setting of colonial conflict. He highlighted the series' exploration of music as both a means of overcoming cultural divisions and an instrument of mind control, interpreting this duality as a complication of the franchise's traditionally optimistic treatment of communication and cultural exchange. The reviewer noted the mixed critical reception, observing other reviewers praised the music, aerial combat and energetic opening episodes while criticizing the exposition-heavy second half, underdeveloped romantic triangle and rushed conclusion. He identified the enduring popularity of the fictional idol group Walküre, which became a successful real-world musical act, as the series' most significant legacy, helping sustain the franchise beyond the television broadcast.
