= Hidetaka Tenjin =

Japanese anime illustrator (born 1973)

- 天神英貴
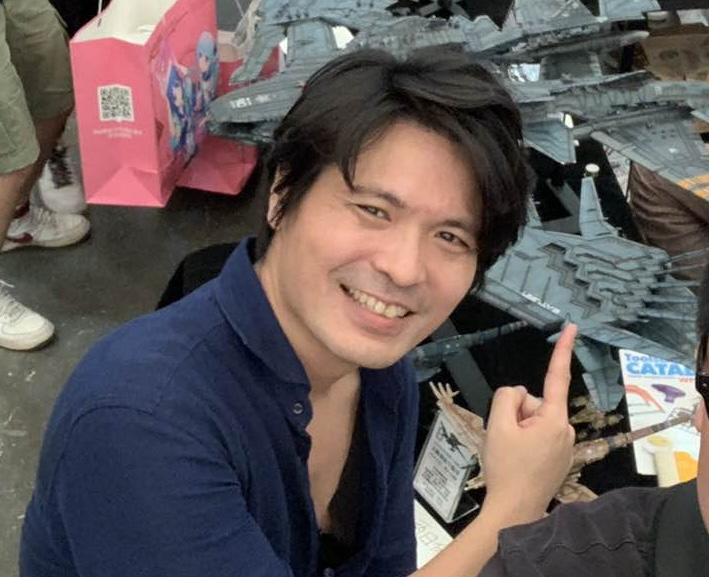
- Tenjin at Shanghai Wonder Festival 2018
- Born: October 13, 1973 (age 53); Kobe City, Japan
- Occupations: Anime artist Sci-fi artist Mecha anime illustrator
- Known for: Macross; The Super Dimension Fortress Macross; Macross Zero; Macross Frontier; Macross Delta; Space Battleship Yamato

Hidetaka Tenjin (天神 英貴, Tenjin Hidetaka; born October 13, 1973) is a Japanese mecha anime artist, science fiction illustrator, and voice actor.

== Personal life ==
Hidetaka Tenjin was born in Nishinomiya, Kobe City, on October 13, 1973. After graduating from the Shibaura institute of Technology's Department of System Engineering, majoring in mechanical control systems, he became a freelance illustrator.

In 2022, Tenjin won the prestigious Inkpot Award, given by Comic-Con International, for his contributions to the world of animation.

== Mechanical and science fiction illustrations ==
Later he established the Tenjin Studio Ltd. where he began working on plastic model box art, video game software and DVD cover art, illustrations, etc., the best known being in the Hasegawa Macross series, the Bandai MG Gundam series, Konami's Gradius V videogame, Space Battleship Yamato Fact File illustrations, etc. He has declared in many occasions that his realistic art style is influenced by the works of Yoshiyuki Takani, Noriyoshi Ohrai, Shigeru Komatsuzaki, Yuji Kaida and Tsuyoshi Nagano.

== Anime ==
Tenjin has also worked as an animation artist in several sci-fi anime productions like Macross Zero, Sousei no Aquarion, Gundam Evolve, Macross Frontier and Macross Delta.

== Voice Acting ==
Tenjin is also an accomplished voice actor, acting professionally since 2003. He has lent his voice to live action narration projects, and has had roles in such notable anime series as Ghost in the Shell SAC 2nd Gig, Hunter x Hunter, and Jujutsu Kaisen.

Tenjin has also provided Japanese vocal dubbing for notable American productions such as Any Given Sunday, Erin Brockovich, Gladiator, and Malcom in the Middle.

A life-long Star Wars fan, Tenjin also provided the Japanese voice for Ryder Azadi in the Star Wars: Rebels animated series, and later reprised his role when the character made a cameo appearance in the live-action Ahsoka series.

== Videography ==
=== Macross ===
- Macross Zero - Mechanical Artist
- Macross Frontier - Mechanical Artist
- Macross Frontier: The False Songstress - Mechanical Artist
- Macross Frontier: The Wings of Farewell - Mechanical Artist
- Macross Delta - Macross Visual Artist

=== Other anime ===
- Bullet/Bullet - Concept Designer, Mechanical Designer
- Hellsing Ultimate - Mechanical Designer, Special Effects
- Genesis of Aquarion - Mechanical Designer, Special Effects
- Aquarion Evol - Mechanical Designer
- Noein - to your other self - Special Effects
- BALDR FORCE EXE Resolution - Texture Artist, Special Effects
- FREEDOM-PROJECT - Background Artist, Special Effects
- Engage Planet Kiss Dum - Mechanical Designer, Special Effects
- Glass Fleet - Texture Artist
- Gundam Evolve - Mechanical Designer, Special Effects
- Yasuke - Mechanical Designer
- Back Arrow - Mechanical Designer
- Mushoku Tensei: Jobless Reincarnation - Mechanical Designer
- Knights and Magic - Mechanical Designer
- Synduality - Mechanical Designer

=== Video games ===
- Sonic Wings Assault - Videogame Box Art
- Macross VF-X2 - Videogame Box Art
- Macross Plus GAME EDITION
- Gradius V - Videogame Box Art
- Armodyne - Videogame Box Art
- STARHAWK - Videogame Box Art Japan Release
- Macross Ultimate Frontier - Videogame Box Art
- Macross Ace Frontier - Videogame Box Art
- Macross Triangle Frontier - Title Art
- Macross 30: The Voice that Connects the Galaxy - Videogame Box Art
- Mobile Suit Gundam Side Stories - Videogame Box Art
- Mobile Suit Gundam: Battle Operation
- Super Robot Wars T - Mechanical Designer
- Dark Machine - Mechanical Designer

== Artbooks ==
- Tenjin Hidetaka Art Works Of Macross: VALKYRIES - Mechanical Illustrator
- Hidetaka Tenjin Works: the Art of Hidetaka Tenjin - Mechanical Illustrator
- Tenjin Hidetaka Art Works Of Macross: VALKYRIES SECOND SORTIE - Mechanical Illustrator
- Macross The Ride - Mechanical Illustrator
- Yamato Mechanical Illustrations - Mechanical Illustrator
- Tenjin Hidetaka Art Works Of Macross: VALKYRIES THIRD SORTIE - Mechanical Illustrator
- Star Wars: The Box Artistry of Hidetaka Tenjin - Author, Artist
- Hidetaka Tenjin's Artistry Of Macross: From Flash Back 2012 To Macross Frontier - Author, Artist
- Hidetaka Tenjin's Artistry of Macross: Macross frontier Films, Macross Delta & Archives - Author, Artist
