= List of Boruto: Naruto Next Generations episodes =

Boruto: Naruto Next Generations is a Japanese anime series based on the manga series of the same name and is a spin-off and sequel to Masashi Kishimoto's Naruto. It is produced by Pierrot and broadcast on TV Tokyo. The anime is directed by Noriyuki Abe (#1–104 (Note: Chief Director), #282–286), Hiroyuki Yamashita (#1–66), Toshirō Fujii (#67–104), and Masayuki Kōda (#105–281, #287–) and is written by Makoto Uezu (#1–66) and Masaya Honda (#67–). Former manga writer Ukyō Kodachi supervised the story until episode 216.

Boruto follows the exploits of Seventh Hokage Naruto Uzumaki's son Boruto and his comrades from the Hidden Leaf Village's ninja academy while finding a path to follow once they grow up. Despite being based on the manga, the anime explores original storylines and adaptations of the spin-off manga, Naruto: The Seventh Hokage and the Scarlet Spring; Boruto: Naruto the Movie; as well as the Naruto Shinden light novel series.

It premiered on TV Tokyo on April 5, 2017, and aired every Wednesday at 5:55 PM JST. Starting May 3, 2018 (episode 56) it aired every Thursday at 7:25 PM JST. Starting October 7, 2018 (episode 76) it now airs every Sunday at 5:30 PM JST. The series is also being released in DVDs. Viz Media licensed the series on March 23, 2017, to simulcast it on Hulu, and on Crunchyroll. On April 21, 2020, it was announced that episode 155 and onward would be delayed due to the ongoing COVID-19 pandemic. After a two-month hiatus, the episode resumed on July 5, 2020. On March 9, 2023, it was announced that the series is set to finish its first part with episode 293 on March 26, 2023, and a second part was announced to be in development.

In the United States, the English dub made its premiere on Adult Swim's Toonami programming block on September 29, 2018. Adult Swim removed the series from the block's rotation after episode 52 on October 20, 2019. Adult Swim executive Jason DeMarco addressed on Twitter that they currently have no plans to bring the anime back. The same batch of dubbed episodes were additionally broadcast in Australia on ABC Me.

== Episode list ==
NOTE: The series does not feature any official "arc" or "season" sub-listing titles on Japanese home media releases, which was originally the case in determining the division of both Naruto anime series. For practicality purposes this article has been split up into smaller sectioned listings, with each representing groups of 52 episodes each (with the exception of the sixth list, which consists of 33 episodes and stops at the end of the anime's first part). These lists do not constitute an official means for dividing the Boruto anime series.

=== List 1 (2017–18) ===
| No. | Title (Note: All English titles are taken from Crunchyroll.) | Directed by | Written by | Original release date | English air date |
|---|---|---|---|---|---|
| 1 | "Boruto Uzumaki!"; Transliteration: "Uzumaki Boruto!!" (Japanese: うずまきボルト!!) | Hiroyuki Yamashita | Makoto Uezu | April 5, 2017 | September 29, 2018 |
| 2 | "The Hokage's Son!"; Transliteration: "Hokage no musuko...!!" (Japanese: 火影の息子...!!) | Ayumu Ono | Kiyomune Miwa Makoto Uezu | April 12, 2017 | October 6, 2018 |
| 3 | "Metal Lee Goes Wild!"; Transliteration: "Bōsō, Metaru Rī!!" (Japanese: 暴走、メタル・リー!!) | Nobuyoshi Nagayama | Hideto Tanaka Makoto Uezu | April 19, 2017 | October 13, 2018 |
| 4 | "A Ninjutsu Battle of the Sexes!"; Transliteration: "Danjo taikō ninjutsu gassen!!" (Japanese: 男女対抗忍術合戦!!) | Hikari Satō | Masahiro Ōkubo | April 26, 2017 | October 20, 2018 |
| 5 | "The Mysterious Transfer Student!"; Transliteration: "Nazo no tenkōsei...!!" (Japanese: 謎の転校生...!!) | Yōji Satō | Kōjiro Nakamura Kō Shigenobu | May 3, 2017 | October 27, 2018 |
| 6 | "The Final Lesson!"; Transliteration: "Saigo no jugyō...!!" (Japanese: 最後の授業...!!) | Hodaka Kuramoto | Kō Shigenobu | May 10, 2017 | November 3, 2018 |
| 7 | "Love and Potato Chips!"; Transliteration: "Koi to potechi...!!" (Japanese: 恋とポテチ...!!) | Kodaira Maki | Hideto Tanaka | May 17, 2017 | November 10, 2018 |
| 8 | "The Dream's Revelation"; Transliteration: "Yume no otsuge" (Japanese: 夢のお告げ) | Matsuki Keiichi | Kiyomune Miwa | May 24, 2017 | November 24, 2018 |
| 9 | "Proof of Oneself"; Transliteration: "Jibun no shōmei" (Japanese: 自分の証明) | Ayumu Ono | Kiyomune Miwa | May 31, 2017 | December 1, 2018 |
| 10 | "The Ghost Incident: The Investigation Begins!"; Transliteration: "Gōsuto jiken, sōsa kaishi!!" (Japanese: ゴースト事件、捜査開始!!) | Masatoyo Takada | Masaya Honda | June 7, 2017 | December 8, 2018 |
| 11 | "The Shadow of The Mastermind"; Transliteration: "Kuromaku no kage" (Japanese: 黒幕の影) | Hikari Satō | Masaya Honda | June 14, 2017 | December 15, 2018 |
| 12 | "Boruto and Mitsuki"; Transliteration: "Boruto to Mitsuki" (Japanese: ボルトとミツキ) | Mizumoto Hazuki | Masahiro Ōkubo | June 21, 2017 | January 5, 2019 |
| 13 | "The Demon Beast Appears!"; Transliteration: "Majū, arawaru...!!" (Japanese: 魔獣、現る...!!) | Nobuyoshi Nagayama | Kō Shigenobu | June 28, 2017 | January 12, 2019 |
| 14 | "The Path That Boruto Can See"; Transliteration: "Boruto ni mieru michi" (Japanese: ボルトに見える道) | Noriyuki Abe | Makoto Uezu | July 5, 2017 | January 19, 2019 |
| 15 | "A New Path"; Transliteration: "Atarashii michi" (Japanese: 新しい道) | Masatoyo Takada Masayuki Matsumoto | Masahiro Ōkubo | July 12, 2017 | January 26, 2019 |
| 16 | "Crisis: The Threat of Failing!"; Transliteration: "Daburi no kiki" (Japanese: 留年(ダブり)の危機) | Kawana Kana | Hideto Tanaka | July 19, 2017 | February 2, 2019 |
| 17 | "Run, Sarada!"; Transliteration: "Sarada, hashiru!!" (Japanese: サラダ、走る!!) | Masaaki Kumagai | Masaya Honda | July 26, 2017 | February 9, 2019 |
| 18 | "A Day in the Life of the Uzumaki Family"; Transliteration: "Uzumaki-ke no ichinichi" (Japanese: うずまき家の一日) | Nagayama Nobuyoshi | Kō Shigenobu | August 2, 2017 | February 16, 2019 |
| 19 | "Sarada Uchiha"; Transliteration: "Uchiha Sarada" (Japanese: うちはサラダ) | Takashi Andō | Masaya Honda | August 9, 2017 | February 23, 2019 |
| 20 | "The Boy With The Sharingan"; Transliteration: "Sharingan no shōnen" (Japanese: 写輪眼の少年) | Hikari Satō | Kōjiro Nakamura | August 16, 2017 | March 2, 2019 |
| 21 | "Sasuke and Sarada"; Transliteration: "Sasuke to Sarada" (Japanese: サスケとサラダ) | Yūsuke Onoda | Masaya Honda | August 23, 2017 | March 9, 2019 |
| 22 | "Connected Feelings"; Transliteration: "Tsunagaru omoi" (Japanese: つながる想い) | Rokō Ogiwara | Kōjiro Nakamura | August 30, 2017 | March 16, 2019 |
| 23 | "Bonds Come in All Shapes"; Transliteration: "Tsunagari no katachi" (Japanese: つながりのカタチ) | Ken'ichi Fujisawa Kaito Asakura | Kōjiro Nakamura | September 6, 2017 | March 23, 2019 |
| 24 | "Boruto and Sarada"; Transliteration: "Boruto to Sarada" (Japanese: ボルトとサラダ) | Ayumu Ono | Masaya Honda | September 13, 2017 | March 30, 2019 |
| 25 | "The Turbulent Field Trip"; Transliteration: "Haran no shūgakuryokō!!" (Japanese: 波乱の修学旅行!!) | Matsuo Asami | Makoto Uezu | September 20, 2017 | April 6, 2019 |
| 26 | "The Mizukage's Successor"; Transliteration: "Mizukage no kōkeisha" (Japanese: 水影の後継者) | Takeru Ogiwara Tomoki Fujiwara Seimei Kidokoro | Kiyomune Miwa | September 27, 2017 | April 14, 2019 (Note: Adult Swim moved Boruto: Naruto Next Generations from 11:30 p.m. to 2:00 a.m. EDT/PDT, making the air dates from episodes 26 to 52 effectively Sunday morning.) |
| 27 | "A Shinobi Bout of Friendship"; Transliteration: "Yūjō no shinobi bauto" (Japanese: 友情のシノビバウト) | Mizumoto Hazuki | Masahiro Ōkubo | October 4, 2017 | April 21, 2019 |
| 28 | "Declaration of War"; Transliteration: "Sensen fukoku" (Japanese: 宣戦布告) | Yūsuke Onoda | Kō Shigenobu Makoto Uezu | October 11, 2017 | April 28, 2019 |
| 29 | "The New Seven Ninja Swordsmen!"; Transliteration: "Shin shinobigatana shichininshū!!" (Japanese: 新・忍刀七人衆!!) | Kazuki Horiguchi | Kō Shigenobu | October 18, 2017 | May 5, 2019 |
| 30 | "The Sharingan vs. The Lightning Blade, Kiba the Fang!"; Transliteration: "Sharingan bāsasu raitō Kiba" (Japanese: 写輪眼VS(バーサス)雷刀·牙) | Naoki Hishikawa | Masaya Honda | October 25, 2017 | May 12, 2019 |
| 31 | "Boruto and Kagura"; Transliteration: "Boruto to Kagura" (Japanese: ボルトとかぐら) | Hikari Satō | Masahiro Ōkubo | November 1, 2017 | May 19, 2019 |
| 32 | "The Quest for Souvenirs"; Transliteration: "Omiyage kuesuto" (Japanese: おみやげクエスト) | Yōji Satō | Masaya Honda | November 8, 2017 | May 26, 2019 |
| 33 | "The Super Beast Scroll Slump!"; Transliteration: "Suranpu!! Chōjū giga" (Japanese: スランプ!! 超獣偽画) | Tomoki Fujiwara Takeru Ogiwara | Hideto Tanaka | November 15, 2017 | June 2, 2019 |
| 34 | "The Night of the Shooting Stars"; Transliteration: "Hoshi furu yoru" (Japanese: 星降る夜) | Seimei Kidokoro | Kiyomune Miwa Ukyō Kodachi | November 22, 2017 | June 9, 2019 |
| 35 | "The Parent Teacher Conference!"; Transliteration: "Sansha mendan...!!" (Japanese: 三者面談...!!) | Tomoki Fujiwara | Kō Shigenobu | November 29, 2017 | June 16, 2019 |
| 36 | "The Graduation Exam Begins!"; Transliteration: "Sotsugyō shiken, kaishi!!" (Japanese: 卒業試験、開始!!) | Yūjirō Abe | Masahiro Ōkubo | December 6, 2017 | June 23, 2019 |
| 37 | "A Shinobi's Resolve"; Transliteration: "Shinobi no kakugo" (Japanese: 忍の覚悟) | Yūsuke Onoda | Masahiro Ōkubo | December 13, 2017 | June 30, 2019 |
| 38 | "Formation of the Three-Man Squad?"; Transliteration: "Surī manseru, kessei...?" (Japanese: スリーマンセル、結成...?) | Hiroyuki Okuno | Masaya Honda | December 20, 2017 | July 7, 2019 |
| 39 | "The Path Lit by the Full Moon"; Transliteration: "Michita tsuki ga terasu michi" (Japanese: 満ちた月が照らす道) | Takeru Ogiwara | Hideto Tanaka | December 27, 2017 | July 14, 2019 |
| 40 | "Team 7: The First Mission"; Transliteration: "Dainanahan, hatsu ninmu!!" (Japanese: 第七班・初任務!!) | Yoshito Hata | Touko Machida | January 10, 2018 | July 21, 2019 |
| 41 | "Strength in Unity"; Transliteration: "Kessoku no chikara" (Japanese: 結束の力) | Kaito Asakura | Tōko Machida | January 17, 2018 | July 28, 2019 |
| 42 | "A Ninja's Job"; Transliteration: "Ninja no oshigoto" (Japanese: 忍者のお仕事) | Kazuki Horiguchi | Kō Shigenobu | January 24, 2018 | August 4, 2019 |
| 43 | "The Byakuya Gang Surfaces!"; Transliteration: "Byakuya-dan, arawaru!!" (Japanese: 白夜団、現る!!) | Nanako Shimazaki | Masaya Honda | January 31, 2018 | August 11, 2019 |
| 44 | "Shikadai's Doubts"; Transliteration: "Shikadai no mayoi" (Japanese: シカダイの迷い) | Masayuki Īmura | Masahiro Ōkubo | February 7, 2018 | August 18, 2019 |
| 45 | "Memories from the Day of Snow"; Transliteration: "Yuki no hi no kioku" (Japanese: 雪の日の記憶) | Yūsuke Onoda | Kō Shigenobu | February 14, 2018 | August 25, 2019 |
| 46 | "Go! The Crest of Night Strategy"; Transliteration: "Kekkō!! Kyokuya sakusen" (Japanese: 決行!! 極夜作戦) | Yūjirō Abe | Kōjiro Nakamura | February 21, 2018 | September 1, 2019 |
| 47 | "The Figure I Want to Be"; Transliteration: "Naritai sugata" (Japanese: 成りたい駒(すがた)) | Takeru Ogiwara | Masaya Honda | February 28, 2018 | September 8, 2019 |
| 48 | "The Genin Documentary"; Transliteration: "Genin dokyumentarī!!" (Japanese: 下忍ドキュメンタリー!!) | Naoki Horiuchi | Hideto Tanaka | March 7, 2018 | September 15, 2019 |
| 49 | "Wasabi and Namida"; Transliteration: "Wasabi de Namida" (Japanese: ワサビでなみだ) | Yūichirō Aoki Masayuki Matsumoto | Tōko Machida | March 14, 2018 | September 22, 2019 |
| 50 | "The Chunin Exams: The Recommendation Meeting"; Transliteration: "Chūnin senbatsu shiken suisen kaigi" (Japanese: 中忍選抜試験推薦会議) | Noriyuki Abe | Masahiro Ōkubo | March 21, 2018 | October 6, 2019 |
| 51 | "Boruto's Birthday"; Transliteration: "Boruto no tanjōbi" (Japanese: ボルトの誕生日) | Norihiko Nagahama | Kō Shigenobu | March 28, 2018 | October 13, 2019 |
| 52 | "Sasuke's Shadow"; Transliteration: "Sasuke no kage" (Japanese: サスケの影) | Kaito Asakura | Kō Shigenobu | April 4, 2018 | October 20, 2019 |

=== List 2 (2018–19) ===
| No. | Title | Directed by | Written by | Original release date |
|---|---|---|---|---|
| 53 | "Himawari's Birthday"; Transliteration: "Himawari no tanjōbi" (Japanese: ヒマワリの誕生日) | Taiki Nishimura | Makoto Uezu | April 11, 2018 |
| 54 | "Sasuke and Boruto"; Transliteration: "Sasuke to Boruto" (Japanese: サスケとボルト) | Yūsuke Onoda | Makoto Uezu | April 18, 2018 |
| 55 | "The Scientific Ninja Tool"; Transliteration: "Kagaku ningu" (Japanese: 科学忍具) | Hodaka Kuramoto | Hideto Tanaka | April 25, 2018 |
| 56 | "Rivals, Gather!"; Transliteration: "Raibaru, shūketsu!!" (Japanese: ライバル、集結!!) | Takeru Ogiwara | Kōjiro Nakamura | May 3, 2018 |
| 57 | "The Reason I Can't Lose"; Transliteration: "Make rarenai riyū" (Japanese: 負けられない理由) | Yūichirō Aoki | Touko Machida | May 10, 2018 |
| 58 | "The Tournament Begins!"; Transliteration: "Tōnamento, kaishi!!" (Japanese: トーナメント、開始!!) | Hideaki Ōba | Masaya Honda | May 17, 2018 |
| 59 | "Boruto vs. Shikadai"; Transliteration: "Boruto bāsasu Shikadai" (Japanese: ボルトVS(バーサス)シカダイ) | Kaito Asakura | Masaya Honda | May 24, 2018 |
| 60 | "The Hidden Leaf vs. The Hidden Sand"; Transliteration: "Konohagakure bāsasu Sunagakure" (Japanese: 木ノ葉隠れVS(バーサス)砂隠れ) | Taiki Nishimura | Masahiro Ōkubo | May 31, 2018 |
| 61 | "The Iron Sand User: Shinki"; Transliteration: "Satetsu tsukai, Shinki" (Japanese: 砂鉄使い・シンキ) | Takeru Ogiwara | Kō Shigenobu | June 7, 2018 |
| 62 | "The Otsutsuki Invasion"; Transliteration: "Ōtsutsuki, Shūrai!!" (Japanese: 大筒木、襲来!!) | Yūsuke Onoda | Kiyomune Miwa | June 14, 2018 |
| 63 | "Sasuke's Secret Weapon"; Transliteration: "Sasuke no kirifuda" (Japanese: サスケの切り札) | Yoshinori Odaka | Tōko Machida | June 28, 2018 |
| 64 | "Rescuing Naruto!"; Transliteration: "Naruto, dakkan!!" (Japanese: ナルト、奪還!!) | Masayuki Matsumoto | Hideto Tanaka | July 5, 2018 |
| 65 | "Father and Child"; Transliteration: "Chichi to ko" (Japanese: 父と子) | Chengxi Huang | Makoto Uezu | July 19, 2018 |
| 66 | "My Story!"; Transliteration: "Ore no monogatari...!!" (Japanese: オレの物語…!!) | Takeru Ogiwara Yūta Suzuki | Masahiro Ōkubo | July 26, 2018 |
| 67 | "Super Cho-Cho Butterfly Mode!"; Transliteration: "Chō Chōchō chō mōdo!!" (Japanese: 超チョウチョウ蝶モード!!) | Yūjirō Abe | Masaya Honda | August 2, 2018 |
| 68 | "Super Cho-Cho Kiss Mode!"; Transliteration: "Chō Chōchō kisu mōdo!!" (Japanese: 超チョウチョウキスモード!!) | Taiki Nishimura | Atsushi Nishiyama | August 9, 2018 |
| 69 | "Super Cho-Cho Love Upheaval!"; Transliteration: "Chō Chōchō koi sōdō!!" (Japanese: 超チョウチョウ恋騒動!!) | Kaito Asakura | Masaya Honda | August 16, 2018 |
| 70 | "The Other Side of Anxiety"; Transliteration: "Kinchō no mukō-gawa" (Japanese: 緊張の向こう側) | Yōko Kanamori | Hideto Tanaka | August 23, 2018 |
| 71 | "The Hardest Rock in the World"; Transliteration: "Sekai de ichiban katai ishi" (Japanese: 世界で一番固い石) | Yūsuke Onoda | Masaya Honda | August 30, 2018 |
| 72 | "Mitsuki's Will"; Transliteration: "Mitsuki no ishi" (Japanese: ミツキの意志) | Takeru Ogiwara Yūta Suzuki | Atsushi Nishiyama | September 6, 2018 |
| 73 | "The Other Side of the Moon"; Transliteration: "Tsuki no uragawa" (Japanese: 月の裏側) | Masayuki Matsumoto | Tōko Machida | September 13, 2018 |
| 74 | "The Enemy, Ino-Shika-Cho!"; Transliteration: "Teki wa Ino–Shika–Chō...!!" (Japanese: 敵は猪鹿蝶…!!) | Yūichirō Aoki | Kō Shigenobu | September 20, 2018 |
| 75 | "The Trials of Ryuchi Cave"; Transliteration: "Ryūchidō no shiren" (Japanese: 龍地洞の試練) | Ayumu Ono | Masahiro Ōkubo | September 20, 2018 (Note: Episodes 74 and 75 aired together as an hour long special at 6:55 PM JST, 30 minutes before the original air time.) |
| 76 | "Incurring Wrath"; Transliteration: "Gekirin ni furero" (Japanese: 逆鱗に触れろ) | Norihiko Nagahama | Hideto Tanaka | October 7, 2018 |
| 77 | "A Fierce Enemy: Garaga's Ferocious Attack!"; Transliteration: "Kyōteki, Garaga no mōkō!!" (Japanese: 強敵、ガラガの猛攻!!) | Yūjirō Abe | Atsushi Nishiyama | October 14, 2018 |
| 78 | "Everyone's Motives"; Transliteration: "Sorezore no omowaku" (Japanese: それぞれの思惑) | Taiki Nishimura | Tōko Machida | October 21, 2018 |
| 79 | "Reunion with Mitsuki"; Transliteration: "Saikai, Mitsuki…!!" (Japanese: 再会、ミツキ…!!) | Takeru Ogiwara | Kō Shigenobu | October 28, 2018 |
| 80 | "Mitsuki's Friend"; Transliteration: "Mitsuki no tomodachi" (Japanese: ミツキのトモダチ) | Yūsuke Onoda | Masaya Honda | November 4, 2018 |
| 81 | "Boruto's Wish"; Transliteration: "Boruto no negai" (Japanese: ボルトの願い) | Kaito Asakura | Atsushi Nishiyama | November 11, 2018 |
| 82 | "Infiltrating the Hidden Stone Village"; Transliteration: "Sen'nyū!! Iwagakure no sato" (Japanese: 潜入!! 岩隠れの里) | Masayuki Matsumoto | Hideto Tanaka | November 18, 2018 |
| 83 | "Ohnoki's Justice"; Transliteration: "Ōnoki no seigi" (Japanese: オオノキの正義) | Yūta Suzuki Yūichirō Aoki | Tōko Machida | November 25, 2018 |
| 84 | "Ohnoki's Thoughts, Ku's Thoughts"; Transliteration: "Ōnoki no omoi, Kū no omoi" (Japanese: オオノキの思い、空の思い) | Yūjirō Abe | Masahiro Ōkubo | December 2, 2018 |
| 85 | "The Heart Stone"; Transliteration: "Kokoro no ishi" (Japanese: 心の石) | Norihiko Nagahama | Masaya Honda | December 9, 2018 |
| 86 | "Kozuchi's Will"; Transliteration: "Kozuchi no ishi" (Japanese: コヅチの意志) | Takeru Ogiwara Yūta Suzuki | Kō Shigenobu | December 16, 2018 |
| 87 | "The Sensation of Living"; Transliteration: "Ikiteiru jikkan" (Japanese: 生きている実感) | Masayuki Kōda | Hideto Tanaka | December 23, 2018 |
| 88 | "Clash: Kokuyou!"; Transliteration: "Gekitotsu, Kokuyō!!" (Japanese: 激突、コクヨウ!!) | Taiki Nishimura | Atsushi Nishiyama | January 6, 2019 |
| 89 | "A Piercing Heart"; Transliteration: "Tsuranuku kokoro" (Japanese: 貫く心) | Yūsuke Onoda | Tōko Machida | January 13, 2019 |
| 90 | "Mitsuki and Sekiei"; Transliteration: "Mitsuki to Sekiei" (Japanese: ミツキとセキエイ) | Takeru Ogiwara | Masahiro Ōkubo | January 20, 2019 |
| 91 | "Ohnoki's Will"; Transliteration: "Ōnoki no ishi" (Japanese: オオノキの意志) | Kaito Asakura | Masaya Honda | January 27, 2019 |
| 92 | "A New Ordinary"; Transliteration: "Atarashī nichijō" (Japanese: 新しい日常) | Yūjirō Abe | Kō Shigenobu | February 3, 2019 |
| 93 | "Parent and Child Day"; Transliteration: "Oyako no hi" (Japanese: 親子の日) | Norihiko Nagahama | Hideto Tanaka | February 10, 2019 |
| 94 | "A Heaping Helping! The Eating Contest!"; Transliteration: "Tenkomori!! Ōgui batoru" (Japanese: てんこ盛り!! 大食いバトル) | Masayuki Matsumoto | Atsushi Nishiyama | February 17, 2019 |
| 95 | "Tactics for Getting Along With Your Daughter"; Transliteration: "Musume to Icha Icha dai sakusen" (Japanese: 娘とイチャイチャ大作戦) | Takeru Ogiwara Yūta Suzuki | Tōko Machida | February 24, 2019 |
| 96 | "Blood, Sweat, and Namida"; Transliteration: "Chi to ase to Namida" (Japanese: 血と汗となみだ) | Takeru Ogiwara Yūta Suzuki | Hideto Tanaka | March 3, 2019 |
| 97 | "Shikadai's Decision"; Transliteration: "Shikadai no ketsudan" (Japanese: シカダイの決断) | Takashi Asami | Masahiro Ōkubo | March 10, 2019 |
| 98 | "The Cursed Forest"; Transliteration: "Norowareta mori" (Japanese: 呪われた森) | Yūsuke Onoda | Masaya Honda | March 17, 2019 |
| 99 | "Jugo and The Curse Mark"; Transliteration: "Jūgo to juin" (Japanese: 重吾と呪印) | Masayuki Matsumoto | Atsushi Nishiyama | March 24, 2019 |
| 100 | "The Predestined Path"; Transliteration: "Kimerareta michi" (Japanese: 決められた道) | Ayumu Ono | Tōko Machida | March 31, 2019 |
| 101 | "Jugo's Reinforcements"; Transliteration: "Jūgo no engun" (Japanese: 重吾の援軍) | Shigenori Kageyama Natsumi Yasue | Kō Shigenobu | April 7, 2019 |
| 102 | "Melee!"; Transliteration: "Ransen!!" (Japanese: 乱戦!!) | Yūjirō Abe | Atsushi Nishiyama | April 14, 2019 |
| 103 | "Migration Season"; Transliteration: "Watari no kisetsu" (Japanese: 渡りの季節) | Takeru Ogiwara | Masaya Honda | April 21, 2019 |
| 104 | "The Little Roommate"; Transliteration: "Chīsana dōkyonin" (Japanese: 小さな同居人) | Yūta Suzuki | Tōko Machida | April 28, 2019 |

=== List 3 (2019–20) ===
| No. | Title | Directed by | Written by | Original release date |
|---|---|---|---|---|
| 105 | "A Wound on the Heart"; Transliteration: "Kokoro no kizuguchi" (Japanese: 心の傷口) | Shigeki Awai | Hideto Tanaka | May 5, 2019 |
| 106 | "The Steam Ninja Scrolls: The S-Rank Mission!"; Transliteration: "Yukemuri ninpōchō: esu ranku ninmu!!" (Japanese: 湯煙忍法帖・Sランク任務!!) | Masayuki Matsumoto | Masaya Honda | May 12, 2019 |
| 107 | "The Steam Ninja Scrolls: The Dog and Cat War!"; Transliteration: "Yukemuri ninpōchō: inuneko sensō!!" (Japanese: 湯煙忍法帖・犬猫戦争!!) | Yūsuke Onoda | Kō Shigenobu | May 19, 2019 |
| 108 | "The Steam Ninja Scrolls: The Haunted Inn!"; Transliteration: "Yukemuri ninpōchō: yūrei ryokan!!" (Japanese: 湯煙忍法帖・幽霊旅館!!) | Kaito Asakura | Masahiro Ōkubo | May 26, 2019 |
| 109 | "The Steam Ninja Scrolls: Potato Chips and the Giant Boulder!"; Transliteration: "Yukemuri ninpōchō: potechi to ō iwa!!" (Japanese: 湯煙忍法帖・ポテチと大岩!!) | Yūichirō Aoki | Atsushi Nishiyama | June 2, 2019 |
| 110 | "The Steam Ninja Scrolls: The Resurrection Hot Springs!"; Transliteration: "Yukemuri ninpōchō: yomigaeri onsen!!" (Japanese: 湯煙忍法帖・蘇り温泉!!) | Taiji Kawanishi | Touko Machida | June 9, 2019 |
| 111 | "The Steam Ninja Scrolls: Mirai's King!"; Transliteration: "Yukemuri ninpōchō: Mirai no gyoku!!" (Japanese: 湯煙忍法帖・ミライの玉!!) | Takeru Ogiwara | Masaya Honda | June 16, 2019 |
| 112 | "The Chunin Selection Conference"; Transliteration: "Chūnin shōkaku shunō kaigi" (Japanese: 中忍昇格首脳会議) | Yūta Suzuki | Hideto Tanaka | June 23, 2019 |
| 113 | "The Qualities of a Captain"; Transliteration: "Taichō no soshitsu" (Japanese: 隊長の素質) | Nao Miyoshi | Atsushi Nishiyama | June 30, 2019 |
| 114 | "X Cards Proxy War!"; Transliteration: "Gemaki dairi sensō!!" (Japanese: ゲマキ代理戦争!!) | Shigeki Awai | Kō Shigenobu | July 7, 2019 |
| 115 | "Team 25"; Transliteration: "Dainijūgo han" (Japanese: 第二十五班) | Kuriyama Yoshihide | Masahiro Ōkubo | July 14, 2019 |
| 116 | "Konohamaru and Remon"; Transliteration: "Konohamaru to Remon" (Japanese: 木ノ葉丸とレモン) | Kaito Asakura | Hideto Tanaka | July 21, 2019 |
| 117 | "Remon's Secret"; Transliteration: "Remon no himitsu" (Japanese: レモンの秘密) | Yūsuke Onoda | Atsushi Nishiyama | July 28, 2019 |
| 118 | "Something That Steals Memories"; Transliteration: "Kioku o kurau mono" (Japanese: 記憶を喰らうモノ) | Masayuki Matsumoto | Tōko Machida | August 4, 2019 |
| 119 | "Konohamaru's Ninja Way"; Transliteration: "Konohamaru no nindō" (Japanese: 木ノ葉丸の忍道) | Ayumu Ono | Hideto Tanaka | August 11, 2019 |
| 120 | "With Sasuke As The Goal"; Transliteration: "Sasuke o mezashite" (Japanese: サスケを目指して) | Kōji Sasaki | Masaya Honda | August 18, 2019 |
| 121 | "The Entrusted Mission: Protect the One Tails!"; Transliteration: "Ichibi o mamore!! Takusareta ninmu" (Japanese: 一尾を守れ!! 託された任務) | Takeru Ogiwara | Yuki Kimura Masaya Honda | August 25, 2019 |
| 122 | "The Puppet Battle!"; Transliteration: "Kugutsu batoru!!" (Japanese: 傀儡バトル!!) | Yūta Suzuki | Kō Shigenobu | September 1, 2019 |
| 123 | "Urashiki Returns"; Transliteration: "Urashiki, fukkatsu" (Japanese: ウラシキ、復活) | Shigeki Awai | Masahiro Ōkubo | September 8, 2019 |
| 124 | "Decision Time"; Transliteration: "Ketsudan no toki" (Japanese: 決断の時) | Kiyomu Fukuda | Atsushi Nishiyama | September 15, 2019 |
| 125 | "Boruto and Shinki"; Transliteration: "Boruto to Shinki" (Japanese: ボルトとシンキ) | Masayuki Matsumoto | Hideto Tanaka | September 22, 2019 |
| 126 | "Shukaku's Trick"; Transliteration: "Shukaku no takurami" (Japanese: 守鶴の企み) | Yūsuke Onoda | Kō Shigenobu | September 29, 2019 |
| 127 | "Make-Out Tactics"; Transliteration: "Icha Icha Takutikusu" (Japanese: イチャイチャタクティクス) | Yūta Suzuki | Tōko Machida | October 6, 2019 |
| 128 | "Urashiki's Target"; Transliteration: "Urashiki no nerai" (Japanese: ウラシキの狙い) | Hiroyuki Okuno | Masaya Honda | October 13, 2019 |
| 129 | "The Village Hidden in the Leaves"; Transliteration: "Konohagakure no sato" (Japanese: 木ノ葉隠れの里) | Tazumi Mukaiyama | Atsushi Nishiyama | October 20, 2019 |
| 130 | "Genin, Assemble!"; Transliteration: "Atsumare, genin!!" (Japanese: 集まれ、下忍!!) | Yoshiharu Shimizu Yūta Suzuki | Masahiro Ōkubo | October 27, 2019 |
| 131 | "The Power of the Nine Tails"; Transliteration: "Kyūbi no chikara" (Japanese: 九尾のカ) | Masayuki Matsumoto | Hideto Tanaka | November 3, 2019 |
| 132 | "Jiraiya's Assignment"; Transliteration: "Jiraiya no kadai" (Japanese: 自来也の課題) | Shigeki Awai | Kō Shigenobu | November 10, 2019 |
| 133 | "A Village Without Sasuke"; Transliteration: "Sasuke no inai sato" (Japanese: サスケのいない里) | Akira Yamada | Tōko Machida | November 24, 2019 |
| 134 | "The Power to See the Future"; Transliteration: "Mirai o yomu chikara" (Japanese: 未来を読むチカラ) | Toshiaki Kamihara | Masaya Honda | December 1, 2019 |
| 135 | "The Last Battle, Urashiki"; Transliteration: "Saishū kessen, Urashiki" (Japanese: 最終決戦、ウラシキ) | Masayuki Kōda | Atsushi Nishiyama | December 8, 2019 |
| 136 | "Crossing Time!"; Transliteration: "Toki o koete!!" (Japanese: 時を越えて!!) | Yūsuke Onoda | Masahiro Ōkubo | December 15, 2019 |
| 137 | "The Samurai Exchange Student"; Transliteration: "Samurai ryūgakusei" (Japanese: サムライ留学生) | Ayumu Ono | Kyōko Katsuya | December 22, 2019 |
| 138 | "Hiashi's Birthday"; Transliteration: "Hiashi no tanjōbi" (Japanese: ヒアシの誕生日) | Michita Shiraishi | Kō Shigenobu | December 29, 2019 |
| 139 | "The Terror! Enko Onikuma"; Transliteration: "Kyōfu!! Onikuma Enko" (Japanese: 恐怖!! 鬼熊えんこ) | Tazumi Mukaiyama | Hideto Tanaka | January 12, 2020 |
| 140 | "The Mind Transfer Jutsu that Lost to Potato Chips"; Transliteration: "Potechi ni maketa shintenshin no jutsu" (Japanese: ポテチに負けた心転身の術) | Masayuki Matsumoto | Tōko Machida | January 19, 2020 |
| 141 | "The Shinobi Prison: Hozuki Castle"; Transliteration: "Shinobi kangoku: Hōzuki-jō" (Japanese: 忍監獄・鬼灯城) | Shigeki Awai | Masaya Honda | January 26, 2020 |
| 142 | "A Test of Willpower"; Transliteration: "Konjō tameshi" (Japanese: 根性試し) | Kiyomu Fukuda | Atsushi Nishiyama | February 2, 2020 |
| 143 | "The Criminal Targeting Kokuri"; Transliteration: "Kokuri o neratta han'nin" (Japanese: コクリを狙った犯人) | Yūta Suzuki | Masahiro Ōkubo | February 9, 2020 |
| 144 | "Kokuri's Secret"; Transliteration: "Kokuri no himitsu" (Japanese: コクリの秘密) | Hodaka Kuramoto | Kyōko Katsuya | February 16, 2020 |
| 145 | "Breaking out of Hozuki Castle"; Transliteration: "Hōzuki-jō o datsugoku seyo" (Japanese: 鬼灯城を脱獄せよ) | Yūsuke Onoda | Masaya Honda | February 23, 2020 |
| 146 | "Executing the Prison Break!"; Transliteration: "Datsugoku, kekkō!!" (Japanese: 脱獄、決行!!) | Hideaki Uehara | Atsushi Nishiyama | March 1, 2020 |
| 147 | "The Fateful Moonlit Battle"; Transliteration: "Gekka no kessen" (Japanese: 月下の決戦) | Yūta Suzuki | Kō Shigenobu | March 8, 2020 |
| 148 | "A New Mission!!"; Transliteration: "Aratana ninmu!!" (Japanese: 新たな任務!!) | Michita Shiraishi | Hideto Tanaka | March 15, 2020 |
| 149 | "Friends!!"; Transliteration: "Tomodachi...!!" (Japanese: 友達...!!) | Ōri Yasukawa | Tōko Machida | March 22, 2020 |
| 150 | "The Value of a Hidden Ace"; Transliteration: "Kirifuda no kachi" (Japanese: 切り札の価値) | Masayuki Matsumoto | Kyōko Katsuya | March 29, 2020 |
| 151 | "Boruto and Tento"; Transliteration: "Boruto to Tentō" (Japanese: ボルトとテントウ) | Yūta Suzuki | Masahiro Ōkubo | April 5, 2020 |
| 152 | "Developing One's Medical Ninjutsu"; Transliteration: "Iryō ninjutsu no susume" (Japanese: 医療忍術のすすめ) | Shigeki Awai | Kyōko Katsuya | April 12, 2020 |
| 153 | "Harmony in Gold"; Transliteration: "Ōgon no hāmonī" (Japanese: 黄金のハーモニー) | Ayumu Ono | Atsushi Nishiyama | April 19, 2020 |
| 154 | "Himawari's Ninja Trial Session"; Transliteration: "Himawari, ninja taiken!!" (Japanese: ヒマワリ、忍者体験!!) | Yūsuke Onoda | Hideto Tanaka | April 26, 2020 |
| 155 | "Mitsuki's Rainy Day"; Transliteration: "Ame no hi no Mitsuki" (Japanese: 雨の日のミツキ) | Hideaki Uehara | Kō Shigenobu | July 5, 2020 (Note: This episode was originally scheduled to air on May 3, 2020, but was subsequently delayed.) |
| 156 | "I Can't Stay in My Slim Form"; Transliteration: "Surimuna mama ja irarenai" (Japanese: スリムなままじゃいられない) | Michita Shiraishi | Tōko Machida | July 12, 2020 (Note: This episode was originally scheduled to air on May 10, 2020, but was subsequently delayed.) |

=== List 4 (2020–21) ===
| No. | Title | Directed by | Written by | Original release date |
|---|---|---|---|---|
| 157 | "Kara's Footprints"; Transliteration: ""Kara" no ashiato" (Japanese: 「殻」の足跡) | Masayuki Matsumoto | Masahiro Ōkubo | July 19, 2020 |
| 158 | "The Man Who Disappeared"; Transliteration: "Kieta otoko" (Japanese: 消えた男) | Tazumi Mukaiyama | Masaya Honda | July 26, 2020 |
| 159 | "The Hashirama Cell"; Transliteration: "Hashirama saibō" (Japanese: 柱間細胞) | Shintarō Inokawa | Atsushi Nishiyama | August 2, 2020 |
| 160 | "To the Land of Silence"; Transliteration: "Shijima no kuni e" (Japanese: 黙の国へ) | Kaito Asakura | Kyōko Katsuya | August 9, 2020 |
| 161 | "The Castle of Nightmares"; Transliteration: "Akumu no shiro" (Japanese: 悪夢の城) | Mihiro Yamaguchi | Masaya Honda | August 16, 2020 |
| 162 | "Escaping the Tightening Net"; Transliteration: "Hōimō o dasshutsu seyo!" (Japanese: 包囲網を脱出せよ!) | Yūta Suzuki | Kō Shigenobu | August 23, 2020 |
| 163 | "The Pursuers"; Transliteration: "Tsuisekisha-tachi" (Japanese: 追跡者たち) | Yūsuke Onoda | Touko Machida | August 30, 2020 |
| 164 | "The Forbidden Jutsu of Death"; Transliteration: "Shi no kinjutsu" (Japanese: 死の禁術) | Ayumu Ono | Masahiro Ōkubo | September 6, 2020 |
| 165 | "The Quadruplets' Duty"; Transliteration: "Yotsugo no shimei" (Japanese: 四つ子の使命) | Michita Shiraishi | Hideto Tanaka | September 13, 2020 |
| 166 | "Death Match"; Transliteration: "Shitō" (Japanese: 死闘) | Kaito Asakura | Atsushi Nishiyama | September 20, 2020 |
| 167 | "Their Decision"; Transliteration: "Futari no kakugo" (Japanese: 二人の覚悟) | Noriyuki Abe | Masaya Honda | September 27, 2020 |
| 168 | "Training Begins!"; Transliteration: "Shugyō kaishi!!" (Japanese: 修業開始!!) | Shintarō Inokawa | Kyōko Katsuya | October 4, 2020 |
| 169 | "A Joint Mission With the Sand"; Transliteration: "Suna to no kyōdō sakusen" (Japanese: 砂との共同作戦) | Ōri Yasukawa | Kyōko Katsuya | October 11, 2020 |
| 170 | "A New Rasengan"; Transliteration: "Atarashii Rasengan" (Japanese: 新しい螺旋丸) | Takashi Asami | Kō Shigenobu | October 18, 2020 |
| 171 | "The Results of Training"; Transliteration: "Shugyō no seika" (Japanese: 修業の成果) | Masayuki Matsumoto | Masahiro Ōkubo | October 25, 2020 |
| 172 | "A Signature of Fear"; Transliteration: "Kyōfu no sain" (Japanese: 恐怖のサイン) | Yūsuke Onoda | Atsushi Nishiyama | November 1, 2020 |
| 173 | "The Secret Behind the Underground Room"; Transliteration: "Chikashitsu no himitsu" (Japanese: 地下室の秘密) | Yūta Suzuki | Masaya Honda | November 8, 2020 |
| 174 | "The Revival of the Divine Tree"; Transliteration: "Shinju saisei" (Japanese: 神樹再生) | Masayuki Matsumoto | Hideto Tanaka | November 15, 2020 |
| 175 | "Beyond the Limits!"; Transliteration: "Genkai no saki e…!!" (Japanese: 限界の先へ…!!) | Kaito Asakura Ōri Yasukawa | Kyōko Katsuya | November 22, 2020 |
| 176 | "Blockade the A-Un Gate!"; Transliteration: "A・N no mon o fūsa seyo!!" (Japanese: あ・んの門を封鎖せよ!!) | Michita Shiraishi | Masaya Honda | November 29, 2020 |
| 177 | "The Iron Wall's Sensing System"; Transliteration: "Teppeki no kanchi shisutemu" (Japanese: 鉄壁の感知システム) | Noriyuki Abe | Masahiro Ōkubo | December 6, 2020 |
| 178 | "Our Fathers' Example"; Transliteration: "Chichi no senaka" (Japanese: 父の背中) | Ayumu Ono | Tōko Machida | December 13, 2020 |
| 179 | "Victor's Scheme"; Transliteration: "Vikuta no inbō" (Japanese: ヴィクタの陰謀) | Takashi Asami | Kō Shigenobu | December 20, 2020 |
| 180 | "The Assassin, Mugino"; Transliteration: "Ansatsusha Mugino" (Japanese: 暗殺者ムギノ) | Masayuki Matsumoto | Atsushi Nishiyama | December 27, 2020 |
| 181 | "The Vessel"; Transliteration: "Utsuwa" (Japanese: 器) | Yūta Suzuki | Masaya Honda | January 10, 2021 |
| 182 | "Ao" (Japanese: 青) | Yūsuke Onoda | Hideto Tanaka | January 17, 2021 |
| 183 | "The Hand"; Transliteration: "Te" (Japanese: 手) | Tazumi Mukaiyama | Kyōko Katsuya | January 24, 2021 |
| 184 | "Puppets"; Transliteration: "Ningyō" (Japanese: 人形) | Seiki Sugawara | Tōko Machida | January 31, 2021 |
| 185 | "Tools"; Transliteration: "Dōgu" (Japanese: 道具) | Michita Shiraishi | Kō Shigenobu | February 7, 2021 |
| 186 | "How You Use It"; Transliteration: "Tsukaikata" (Japanese: 使い方) | Noriyuki Abe Nozomi Fukui | Atsushi Nishiyama | February 14, 2021 |
| 187 | "Karma"; Transliteration: "Kāma" (Japanese: 楔(カーマ)) | Kim Min-sun | Kyōko Katsuya | February 21, 2021 |
| 188 | "Awakening"; Transliteration: "Mezame" (Japanese: 目覚め) | Takashi Asami | Masahiro Ōkubo | February 28, 2021 |
| 189 | "Resonance"; Transliteration: "Kyōmei" (Japanese: 共鳴) | Pierrot | Pierrot | March 7, 2021 |
| 190 | "Escape"; Transliteration: "Dassō" (Japanese: 脱走) | Masayuki Matsumoto | Hideto Tanaka | March 14, 2021 |
| 191 | "Stray Dog"; Transliteration: "Norainu" (Japanese: 野良犬) | Yūsuke Onoda | Masaya Honda | March 21, 2021 |
| 192 | "The Past"; Transliteration: "Kako" (Japanese: 過去) | Masayuki Kōda | Masaya Honda | March 28, 2021 |
| 193 | "Coexistence"; Transliteration: "Dōkyo" (Japanese: 同居) | Natsumi Yasue | Atsushi Nishiyama | April 4, 2021 |
| 194 | "The Uzumaki Household"; Transliteration: "Uzumaki-ke" (Japanese: うずまき家) | Shigetaka Ikeda | Kyōko Katsuya | April 11, 2021 |
| 195 | "A Vase"; Transliteration: "Kabin" (Japanese: 花瓶) | Michita Shiraishi | Tōko Machida | April 18, 2021 |
| 196 | "A Binding Force"; Transliteration: "Tsunagu Chikara" (Japanese: 繋ぐ力) | Yūta Suzuki | Kō Shigenobu | April 25, 2021 |
| 197 | "Delta"; Transliteration: "Deruta" (Japanese: デルタ) | Kim Min-sun | Masahiro Ōkubo | May 2, 2021 |
| 198 | "Monsters"; Transliteration: "Bakemon" (Japanese: 怪物(バケモン)) | Nozomi Fukui | Hideto Tanaka | May 9, 2021 |
| 199 | "Overload"; Transliteration: "Ōbārōdo" (Japanese: オーバーロード) | Masayuki Matsumoto | Tōko Machida | May 16, 2021 |
| 200 | "Becoming a Student"; Transliteration: "Deshiiri" (Japanese: 弟子入り) | Yūsuke Onoda | Kyōko Katsuya | May 23, 2021 |
| 201 | "Empty Tears"; Transliteration: "Karappo no Namida" (Japanese: 空っぽの涙) | Takeshi Yoshimoto | Atsushi Nishiyama | May 30, 2021 |
| 202 | "The Cult"; Transliteration: "Kyōdan" (Japanese: 教団) | Seiki Sugawara | Masaya Honda | June 6, 2021 |
| 203 | "Surprise Attack!"; Transliteration: "Kyūshū...!!" (Japanese: 急襲…!!) | Shigetaka Ikeda | Kō Shigenobu | June 13, 2021 |
| 204 | "He's Bad News"; Transliteration: "Yabai Yarō" (Japanese: ヤバイ野郎) | Takeru Ogiwara | Masahiro Ōkubo | June 20, 2021 |
| 205 | "Proof"; Transliteration: "Shōmei" (Japanese: 証明) | Michita Shiraishi | Atsushi Nishiyama | June 27, 2021 |
| 206 | "The New Team Seven"; Transliteration: "Shinsei Dai Nana-han" (Japanese: 新生第七班) | Sōta Yokote | Hideto Tanaka | July 4, 2021 |
| 207 | "Regeneration"; Transliteration: "Saisei" (Japanese: 再生) | Ayumu Ono | Kyōko Katsuya | July 11, 2021 |
| 208 | "Momoshiki's Manifestation"; Transliteration: "Momoshiki Kengen" (Japanese: モモシキ顕現) | Ryūta Yamamoto | Tōko Machida | July 18, 2021 |

=== List 5 (2021–22) ===
| No. | Title | Directed by | Written by | Original release date |
|---|---|---|---|---|
| 209 | "The Outcast"; Transliteration: "Nokemono" (Japanese: ノケモノ) | Yūsuke Onoda | Masaya Honda | August 1, 2021 |
| 210 | "Clues to Kara"; Transliteration: "Kara no Tegakari" (Japanese: 殻の手がかり) | Nozomi Fukui | Masahiro Ōkubo | August 8, 2021 |
| 211 | "The Chase"; Transliteration: "Tsuiseki" (Japanese: 追跡) | Yūta Suzuki | Kō Shigenobu | August 15, 2021 |
| 212 | "Amado's Defection"; Transliteration: "Amado no Bōmei" (Japanese: アマドの亡命) | Shigetaka Ikeda | Kyōko Katsuya | August 22, 2021 |
| 213 | "True Identity"; Transliteration: "Shōtai" (Japanese: 正体) | Ōri Yasukawa | Masaya Honda | August 29, 2021 |
| 214 | "Predestined Fate"; Transliteration: "Shukumei" (Japanese: 宿命) | Noriyuki Abe Masayuki Matsumoto Ema Saitō | Atsushi Nishiyama | September 5, 2021 |
| 215 | "Prepared"; Transliteration: "Kakugo" (Japanese: 覚悟) | Mitsuo Hashimoto | Hideto Tanaka | September 12, 2021 |
| 216 | "Sacrifice"; Transliteration: "Ikenie" (Japanese: 生贄) | Ayumu Ono | Masaya Honda | September 19, 2021 |
| 217 | "Decision"; Transliteration: "Ketsui" (Japanese: 決意) | Nozomi Fukui | Masaya Honda | September 26, 2021 |
| 218 | "Partner"; Transliteration: "Aibō" (Japanese: 相棒) | Masayuki Kōda Yūsuke Onoda | Masaya Honda | October 3, 2021 |
| 219 | "Return"; Transliteration: "Kikan" (Japanese: 帰還) | Tazumi Mukaiyama | Kō Shigenobu | October 10, 2021 |
| 220 | "Remaining Time"; Transliteration: "Nokosareta Jikan" (Japanese: 残された時間) | Takeshi Yoshimoto | Masaya Honda | October 17, 2021 |
| 221 | "The Chunin Exams Resume"; Transliteration: "Chūnin Shiken, Futatabi" (Japanese: 中忍試験、再び) | Shigetaka Ikeda | Kyōko Katsuya | October 24, 2021 |
| 222 | "The Night Before the Final Round"; Transliteration: "Kessen Zen'ya" (Japanese: 決戦前夜) | Naoki Kotani | Atsushi Nishiyama | October 31, 2021 |
| 223 | "Inojin vs. Houki"; Transliteration: "Inojin tai Hōki" (Japanese: いのじん対ホウキ) | Yoshifumi Sasahara | Masahiro Ōkubo | November 7, 2021 |
| 224 | "The Legend of the Monster Cat"; Transliteration: "Bakeneko Densetsu" (Japanese: 化け猫伝説) | Mitsuo Hashimoto | Hideto Tanaka | November 14, 2021 |
| 225 | "Showdown Between Best Friends"; Transliteration: "Shin'yū Taiketsu" (Japanese: 親友対決) | Noriyuki Abe Ema Saitō | Tōko Machida | November 21, 2021 |
| 226 | "Samurai vs. Science"; Transliteration: "Samurai tai Kagaku" (Japanese: サムライ対カガク) | Ayumu Ono | Kō Shigenobu | November 28, 2021 |
| 227 | "Team 7's Last Mission?!"; Transliteration: "Dainanahan, Saigo no Ninmu!?" (Japanese: 第七班、最後の任務!?) | Yūsuke Onoda | Masahiro Ōkubo | December 5, 2021 |
| 228 | "Kawaki's Path to Becoming a Ninja"; Transliteration: "Kawaki, Shinobi e no Michi" (Japanese: カワキ、忍への道) | Masayuki Matsumoto | Kyōko Katsuya | December 12, 2021 |
| 229 | "Breach of Orders"; Transliteration: "Meirei Ihan" (Japanese: 命令違反) | Yūta Suzuki | Kyōko Katsuya | December 19, 2021 |
| 230 | "A Wish"; Transliteration: "Negai" (Japanese: 願い) | Tazumi Mukaiyama | Kyōko Katsuya | December 26, 2021 |
| 231 | "The Rusty Sword"; Transliteration: "Sabita Katana" (Japanese: 錆びた刀) | Shigetaka Ikeda | Atsushi Nishiyama | January 9, 2022 |
| 232 | "Captain Denki's First Mission"; Transliteration: "Denki Taichō no Hatsu Ninmu" (Japanese: デンキ隊長の初任務) | Takeshi Yoshimoto | Tōko Machida | January 16, 2022 |
| 233 | "The New Team 7 Jumps Into Action"; Transliteration: "Shinsei Dai Nana-han, Hatsudō" (Japanese: 新生第七班、発動) | Yūichirō Aoki | Masaya Honda | January 23, 2022 |
| 234 | "The Unleashed Villain"; Transliteration: "Hanatareta Akutō" (Japanese: 放たれた悪党) | Rokō Ogiwara | Masaya Honda | January 30, 2022 |
| 235 | "Infiltrating Dotou Island"; Transliteration: "Sennyū, Dotōjima" (Japanese: 潜入、ドトウ島) | Masayuki Matsumoto | Atsushi Nishiyama | February 6, 2022 |
| 236 | "Cut and Run"; Transliteration: "Dasshutsu" (Japanese: 脱出) | Yūsuke Onoda | Kyōko Katsuya | February 13, 2022 |
| 237 | "The Mobile Fortress"; Transliteration: "Idō Yōsai" (Japanese: 移動要塞) | Ema Saitō | Hideto Tanaka | February 20, 2022 |
| 238 | "A Killer on the Ship"; Transliteration: "Satsujinki no Fune" (Japanese: 殺人鬼の船) | Akira Shimizu | Kō Shigenobu | February 27, 2022 |
| 239 | "The Boy from the Isle of Shipbuilders"; Transliteration: "Zōsen no Shima no Shōnen" (Japanese: 造船の島の少年) | Shigetaka Ikeda | Masahiro Ōkubo | March 6, 2022 |
| 240 | "Ikada's Dream"; Transliteration: "Ikada no Yume" (Japanese: イカダの夢) | Tazumi Mukaiyama | Masahiro Ōkubo | March 13, 2022 |
| 241 | "Ikada's Secret"; Transliteration: "Ikada no Himitsu" (Japanese: イカダの秘密) | Yoshifumi Sasahara | Tōko Machida | March 20, 2022 |
| 242 | "Seiren" (Japanese: 青煉(セイレン)) | Ayumu Ono | Masaya Honda | March 27, 2022 |
| 243 | "Where I Belong"; Transliteration: "Ibasho" (Japanese: 居場所) | Rokō Ogiwara | Atsushi Nishiyama | April 3, 2022 |
| 244 | "Rift"; Transliteration: "Kiretsu" (Japanese: 亀裂) | Naoki Kotani | Kyōko Katsuya | April 10, 2022 |
| 245 | "Funamushi's Tenacity"; Transliteration: "Funamushi no Shūnen" (Japanese: フナムシの執念) | Yūsuke Onoda | Kō Shigenobu | April 17, 2022 |
| 246 | "A Heavy Loss"; Transliteration: "Itade" (Japanese: 痛手) | Takeshi Yoshimoto | Tōko Machida | April 24, 2022 |
| 247 | "For Kagura"; Transliteration: "Kagura no Tame ni" (Japanese: かぐらのために) | Akira Shimizu | Hideto Tanaka | May 1, 2022 |
| 248 | "Another Fierce Battle"; Transliteration: "Shitō, Futatabi" (Japanese: 死闘、再び) | Masayuki Matsumoto | Atsushi Nishiyama | May 8, 2022 |
| 249 | "Burgeoning Hatred"; Transliteration: "Nikushimi no Me" (Japanese: 憎しみの芽) | Shigetaka Ikeda | Kyōko Katsuya | May 15, 2022 |
| 250 | "The Blood of the Funato"; Transliteration: "Funato no Chi" (Japanese: 舟戸の血) | Ema Saitō | Masaya Honda | May 22, 2022 |
| 251 | "Their Resolve"; Transliteration: "Futari no Ketsui" (Japanese: 二人の決意) | Tazumi Mukaiyama | Masahiro Ōkubo | May 29, 2022 |
| 252 | "The Desire to Believe"; Transliteration: "Shinjiru Kimochi" (Japanese: 信じる気持ち) | Rokō Ogiwara | Tōko Machida | June 5, 2022 |
| 253 | "Conflicting Feelings"; Transliteration: "Aiirenai Omoi" (Japanese: 相容れない想い) | Mitsuo Hashimoto | Tōko Machida Atsushi Nishiyama | June 12, 2022 |
| 254 | "The Spiral of Revenge"; Transliteration: "Fukushū no Uzu" (Japanese: 復讐の渦) | Ryūta Yamamoto | Atsushi Nishiyama | June 19, 2022 |
| 255 | "A Tricky Assignment"; Transliteration: "Yakkai na Shukudai" (Japanese: 厄介な宿題) | JOL-chan | Masahiro Ōkubo | June 26, 2022 |
| 256 | "The Ultimate Recipe"; Transliteration: "Gokujō no Reshipi" (Japanese: 極上のレシピ) | Yūsuke Onoda | Kyōko Katsuya | July 3, 2022 |
| 257 | "Konohamaru Becomes the Hokage?!"; Transliteration: "Hokage ni Natta Konohamaru!?" (Japanese: 火影になった木ノ葉丸!？) | Naoki Kotani | Hideto Tanaka | July 10, 2022 |
| 258 | "The Uzumaki Family's Hot Springs Vacation"; Transliteration: "Uzumaki-ke no Onsen Ryokō" (Japanese: うずまき家の温泉旅行) | Takeshi Yoshimoto | Tōko Machida | July 17, 2022 |
| 259 | "A Wound That Never Heals"; Transliteration: "Ienai Kizu" (Japanese: 癒えない傷) | Akira Shimizu | Kyōko Katsuya | July 24, 2022 |
| 260 | "Fireworks of Love"; Transliteration: "Koi no Uchiage Hanabi" (Japanese: 恋の打ち上げ花火) | Yūta Suzuki | Atsushi Nishiyama | July 31, 2022 |

=== List 6 (2022–23) ===
| No. | Title | Directed by | Written by | Original release date |
|---|---|---|---|---|
| 261 | "Kawaki Enters the Ninja Academy!"; Transliteration: "Kawaki, Akademī Nyūgaku!!" (Japanese: カワキ、忍者学校(アカデミー)入学!!) | Masayuki Matsumoto | Kō Shigenobu | August 7, 2022 |
| 262 | "The Princess's Tea Party"; Transliteration: "Ohime-sama no Ochakai" (Japanese: お姫様のお茶会) | Ayumu Ono | Kō Shigenobu | August 14, 2022 |
| 263 | "Bloom, Hana! The Teacher's Gifts"; Transliteration: "Hana Hirake!! Kyōshi no Sainō" (Japanese: 花開け!!教師の才能) | Rokō Ogiwara | Kyōko Katsuya | August 21, 2022 |
| 264 | "The Seven Mysteries Investigative Team Forms!"; Transliteration: "Nana Fushigi Tanken-tai Kessei!!" (Japanese: 七不思議探検隊結成!!) | Tazumi Mukaiyama | Atsushi Nishiyama | August 28, 2022 |
| 265 | "Team Rivalry: Practical Skills Training!"; Transliteration: "Chīmu Taikō, Jitsugi Jisshū!!" (Japanese: チーム対抗、実技実習!!) | Ema Saitō | Tōko Machida | September 4, 2022 |
| 266 | "Himawari Kidnapped!"; Transliteration: "Himawari Yūkai Jiken" (Japanese: ヒマワリ誘拐事件) | Ōri Yasukawa | Masahiro Ōkubo | September 11, 2022 |
| 267 | "Kawaki's Cover Blown?!"; Transliteration: "Kawaki, Shōtai Hakkaku!?" (Japanese: カワキ、正体発覚！？) | Yūsuke Onoda | Hideto Tanaka | September 18, 2022 |
| 268 | "Target: The School Festival"; Transliteration: "Nerawareta Gakuensai" (Japanese: 狙われた学園祭) | Ryūta Yamamoto | Kō Shigenobu | September 25, 2022 |
| 269 | "The Sneaking Shadow"; Transliteration: "Shinobiyoru Kage" (Japanese: 忍び寄る影) | Yūji Kanzaki | Kyōko Katsuya | October 2, 2022 |
| 270 | "Two Sides of the Same Coin"; Transliteration: "Hyōri Ittai" (Japanese: 表裏一体) | Naoki Kotani | Tōko Machida | October 9, 2022 |
| 271 | "The Island of Treachery"; Transliteration: "Uragiri no Shima" (Japanese: 裏切りの島) | Mitsuo Hashimoto | Masahiro Ōkubo | October 16, 2022 |
| 272 | "Students Unite!"; Transliteration: "Seito Danketsu!!" (Japanese: 生徒団結!!) | Yūta Suzuki | Kyōko Katsuya | October 23, 2022 |
| 273 | "Farewell, Academy!"; Transliteration: "Saraba Akademī!!" (Japanese: さらば忍者学校(アカデミー)!!) | Yūichirō Aoki | Kō Shigenobu | October 30, 2022 |
| 274 | "A Flightless Hawk"; Transliteration: "Tobenai Taka" (Japanese: 翔べない鷹) | Akira Shimizu | Masaya Honda | November 6, 2022 |
| 275 | "Into the Sky Again"; Transliteration: "Futatabi Sora e" (Japanese: 再び空へ) | Yūji Kanzaki | Masaya Honda | November 13, 2022 |
| 276 | "Welcome to the Maze"; Transliteration: "Meikyū e Yōkoso" (Japanese: 迷宮へようこそ) | Nozomi Fukui | Masaya Honda | November 20, 2022 |
| 277 | "Disappearing Lives"; Transliteration: "Kieru Inochi" (Japanese: 消える命) | Yūsuke Onoda | Atsushi Nishiyama | November 27, 2022 |
| 278 | "Musical Chairs"; Transliteration: "Isutori Gēmu" (Japanese: 椅子取りゲーム) | Ema Saitō | Masaya Honda | December 4, 2022 |
| 279 | "The Obstacle: Seven"; Transliteration: "Nana no Kabe" (Japanese: 七の壁) | Masayuki Matsumoto | Masaya Honda | December 11, 2022 |
| 280 | "Breakthrough"; Transliteration: "Toppakō" (Japanese: 突破口) | Takeshi Yoshimoto | Atsushi Nishiyama | December 18, 2022 |
| 281 | "The Eighth Truth"; Transliteration: "Yattsume no Shinjitsu" (Japanese: 八つ目の真実) | Ayumu Ono | Masaya Honda | December 25, 2022 |
| 282 | "Sasuke's Story: Infiltration"; Transliteration: "Sasuke Retsuden・Sennyū" (Japanese: サスケ烈伝・潜入) | Yūta Suzuki | Tōko Machida | January 8, 2023 |
| 283 | "Sasuke's Story: Star Lines"; Transliteration: "Sasuke Retsuden・Hoshinarabe" (Japanese: サスケ烈伝・星ならべ) | Nozomi Fukui | Atsushi Nishiyama | January 15, 2023 |
| 284 | "Sasuke's Story: The Secret in the Cellar"; Transliteration: "Sasuke Retsuden・Chikashitsu no Himitsu" (Japanese: サスケ烈伝・地下室の秘密) | Yūji Kanzaki | Masahiro Ōkubo | January 22, 2023 |
| 285 | "Sasuke's Story: The Sky that Fell to the Earth"; Transliteration: "Sasuke Retsuden・Chi ni Furishi Sora" (Japanese: サスケ烈伝・地に降りし空) | Ema Saitō | Kyōko Katsuya | January 29, 2023 |
| 286 | "Sasuke's Story: The Ring"; Transliteration: "Sasuke Retsuden・Yubiwa" (Japanese: サスケ烈伝・指輪) | Itoko Nagai; Noriyuki Abe | Kō Shigenobu | February 5, 2023 |
| 287 | "Claw Marks"; Transliteration: "Tsumeato" (Japanese: 爪痕) | Ayumu Ono; Masayuki Kōda | Masaya Honda | February 12, 2023 |
| 288 | "Captives"; Transliteration: "Toriko" (Japanese: 虜) | Yūta Suzuki | Hideto Tanaka | February 19, 2023 |
| 289 | "Qualifications"; Transliteration: "Shikaku" (Japanese: 資格) | Yūsuke Onoda | Masaya Honda | February 26, 2023 |
| 290 | "Presence"; Transliteration: "Kehai" (Japanese: 気配) | Yoshifumi Sasahara | Masaya Honda | March 5, 2023 |
| 291 | "Control"; Transliteration: "Kontorōru" (Japanese: 支配(コントロール)) | Ema Saitō | Masaya Honda | March 12, 2023 |
| 292 | "Hunger"; Transliteration: "Katsubō" (Japanese: 渇望) | Masayuki Kōda | Masaya Honda | March 19, 2023 |
| 293 | "Farewell"; Transliteration: "Wakare" (Japanese: 別れ) | Nozomi Fukui | Masaya Honda | March 26, 2023 |

== Home media release ==
=== Japanese ===
Aniplex (Japan, Region 2)
| DVD | Release date | Discs | Episodes | DVD-BOX | Release date | Discs | Episodes |
|---|---|---|---|---|---|---|---|
| 1 | July 26, 2017 | 1 | 1–4 | 1 | November 1, 2017 | 4 | 1–15 |
| 2 | August 23, 2017 | 1 | 5–8 | 1 | November 1, 2017 | 4 | 1–15 |
| 3 | September 27, 2017 | 1 | 9–12 | 1 | November 1, 2017 | 4 | 1–15 |
| 4 | October 25, 2017 | 1 | 13–15 | 1 | November 1, 2017 | 4 | 1–15 |
| 5 | December 6, 2017 | 1 | 16–20 | 2 | March 7, 2018 | 4 | 16–32 |
| 6 | January 10, 2018 | 1 | 21–24 | 2 | March 7, 2018 | 4 | 16–32 |
| 7 | February 7, 2018 | 1 | 25–28 | 2 | March 7, 2018 | 4 | 16–32 |
| 8 | March 7, 2018 | 1 | 29–32 | 2 | March 7, 2018 | 4 | 16–32 |
| 9 | April 4, 2018 | 1 | 33–35 | 3 | August 8, 2018 | 5 | 33–50 |
| 10 | May 9, 2018 | 1 | 36–39 | 3 | August 8, 2018 | 5 | 33–50 |
| 11 | June 6, 2018 | 1 | 40–43 | 3 | August 8, 2018 | 5 | 33–50 |
| 12 | July 4, 2018 | 1 | 44–47 | 3 | August 8, 2018 | 5 | 33–50 |
| 13 | August 8, 2018 | 1 | 48–50 | 3 | August 8, 2018 | 5 | 33–50 |
| 14 | September 5, 2018 | 1 | 51–54 | 4 | January 9, 2019 | 5 | 51–70 |
| 15 | October 3, 2018 | 1 | 55–58 | 4 | January 9, 2019 | 5 | 51–70 |
| 16 | November 7, 2018 | 1 | 59–62 | 4 | January 9, 2019 | 5 | 51–70 |
| 17 | December 5, 2018 | 1 | 63–66 | 4 | January 9, 2019 | 5 | 51–70 |
| 18 | January 9, 2019 | 1 | 67–70 | 4 | January 9, 2019 | 5 | 51–70 |
| 19 | February 6, 2019 | 1 | 71–75 | 5 | June 5, 2019 | 5 | 71–92 |
| 20 | March 6, 2019 | 1 | 76–80 | 5 | June 5, 2019 | 5 | 71–92 |
| 21 | April 3, 2019 | 1 | 81–84 | 5 | June 5, 2019 | 5 | 71–92 |
| 22 | May 15, 2019 | 1 | 85–88 | 5 | June 5, 2019 | 5 | 71–92 |
| 23 | June 5, 2019 | 1 | 89–92 | 5 | June 5, 2019 | 5 | 71–92 |
| 24 | July 3, 2019 | 1 | 93–97 | 6 | November 6, 2019 | 5 | 93–115 |
| 25 | August 7, 2019 | 1 | 98–101 | 6 | November 6, 2019 | 5 | 93–115 |
| 26 | September 4, 2019 | 1 | 102–105 | 6 | November 6, 2019 | 5 | 93–115 |
| 27 | October 2, 2019 | 1 | 106–110 | 6 | November 6, 2019 | 5 | 93–115 |
| 28 | November 6, 2019 | 1 | 111–115 | 6 | November 6, 2019 | 5 | 93–115 |
| 29 | December 4, 2019 | 1 | 116–119 | 7 | April 1, 2020 | 5 | 116–136 |
| 30 | January 15, 2020 | 1 | 120–123 | 7 | April 1, 2020 | 5 | 116–136 |
| 31 | February 5, 2020 | 1 | 124–128 | 7 | April 1, 2020 | 5 | 116–136 |
| 32 | March 4, 2020 | 1 | 129–132 | 7 | April 1, 2020 | 5 | 116–136 |
| 33 | April 1, 2020 | 1 | 133–136 | 7 | April 1, 2020 | 5 | 116–136 |
| 34 | June 3, 2020 | 1 | 137–140 | 8 | October 7, 2020 | 5 | 137–156 |
| 35 | July 1, 2020 | 1 | 141–143 | 8 | October 7, 2020 | 5 | 137–156 |
| 36 | August 5, 2020 | 1 | 144–147 | 8 | October 7, 2020 | 5 | 137–156 |
| 37 | September 2, 2020 | 1 | 148–151 | 8 | October 7, 2020 | 5 | 137–156 |
| 38 | October 7, 2020 | 1 | 152–156 | 8 | October 7, 2020 | 5 | 137–156 |
| 39 | December 9, 2020 | 1 | 157–160 | 9 | April 7, 2021 | 5 | 157–176 |
| 40 | January 13, 2021 | 1 | 161–164 | 9 | April 7, 2021 | 5 | 157–176 |
| 41 | February 3, 2021 | 1 | 165–168 | 9 | April 7, 2021 | 5 | 157–176 |
| 42 | March 3, 2021 | 1 | 169–172 | 9 | April 7, 2021 | 5 | 157–176 |
| 43 | April 7, 2021 | 1 | 173–176 | 9 | April 7, 2021 | 5 | 157–176 |
| 44 | May 12, 2021 | 1 | 177–180 | 10 | August 4, 2021 | 4 | 177–189 |
| 45 | June 2, 2021 | 1 | 181–183 | 10 | August 4, 2021 | 4 | 177–189 |
| 46 | July 7, 2021 | 1 | 184–186 | 10 | August 4, 2021 | 4 | 177–189 |
| 47 | August 4, 2021 | 1 | 187–189 | 10 | August 4, 2021 | 4 | 177–189 |
| 48 | September 8, 2021 | 1 | 190–192 | 11 | December 1, 2021 | 4 | 190–205 |
| 49 | October 6, 2021 | 1 | 193–197 | 11 | December 1, 2021 | 4 | 190–205 |
| 50 | November 3, 2021 | 1 | 198–201 | 11 | December 1, 2021 | 4 | 190–205 |
| 51 | December 1, 2021 | 1 | 202–205 | 11 | December 1, 2021 | 4 | 190–205 |
| 52 | January 12, 2022 | 1 | 206–208 | 12 | April 6, 2022 | 4 | 206–220 |
| 53 | February 2, 2022 | 1 | 209–212 | 12 | April 6, 2022 | 4 | 206–220 |
| 54 | March 2, 2022 | 1 | 213–216 | 12 | April 6, 2022 | 4 | 206–220 |
| 55 | April 6, 2022 | 1 | 217–220 | 12 | April 6, 2022 | 4 | 206–220 |
| 56 | May 11, 2022 | 1 | 221–223 | 13 | August 3, 2022 | 4 | 221–232 |
| 57 | June 1, 2022 | 1 | 224–226 | 13 | August 3, 2022 | 4 | 221–232 |
| 58 | July 6, 2022 | 1 | 227–229 | 13 | August 3, 2022 | 4 | 221–232 |
| 59 | August 3, 2022 | 1 | 230–232 | 13 | August 3, 2022 | 4 | 221–232 |
| 60 | September 7, 2022 | 1 | 233–235 | 14 | December 7, 2022 | 4 | 233–246 |
| 61 | October 5, 2022 | 1 | 236–238 | 14 | December 7, 2022 | 4 | 233–246 |
| 62 | November 2, 2022 | 1 | 239–241 | 14 | December 7, 2022 | 4 | 233–246 |
| 63 | December 7, 2022 | 1 | 242–246 | 14 | December 7, 2022 | 4 | 233–246 |
| 64 | January 11, 2023 | 1 | 247–249 | 15 | April 5, 2023 | 4 | 247–260 |
| 65 | February 1, 2023 | 1 | 250–252 | 15 | April 5, 2023 | 4 | 247–260 |
| 66 | March 1, 2023 | 1 | 253–256 | 15 | April 5, 2023 | 4 | 247–260 |
| 67 | April 5, 2023 | 1 | 257–260 | 15 | April 5, 2023 | 4 | 247–260 |
| 68 | May 10, 2023 | 1 | 261–263 | 16 | August 2, 2023 | 4 | 261–273 |
| 69 | June 7, 2023 | 1 | 264–266 | 16 | August 2, 2023 | 4 | 261–273 |
| 70 | July 5, 2023 | 1 | 267–269 | 16 | August 2, 2023 | 4 | 261–273 |
| 71 | August 2, 2023 | 1 | 270–273 | 16 | August 2, 2023 | 4 | 261–273 |
| 72 | September 6, 2023 | 1 | 274–277 | 17 | January 10, 2024 | 5 | 274–293 |
| 73 | October 4, 2023 | 1 | 278–281 | 17 | January 10, 2024 | 5 | 274–293 |
| 74 | November 1, 2023 | 1 | 282–286 | 17 | January 10, 2024 | 5 | 274–293 |
| 75 | December 6, 2023 | 1 | 287–289 | 17 | January 10, 2024 | 5 | 274–293 |
| 76 | January 10, 2024 | 1 | 290–293 | 17 | January 10, 2024 | 5 | 274–293 |

=== English ===
Viz Media (North America, Region A / 1)
| Set | Release date | Discs | Episodes | Ref. |
|---|---|---|---|---|
| 1 | April 9, 2019 | 2 | 1–13 + OVA | |
| 2 | July 16, 2019 | 2 | 14–26 | |
| 3 | October 8, 2019 | 2 | 27–39 | |
| 4 | January 21, 2020 | 2 | 40–52 | |
| 5 | April 21, 2020 | 2 | 53–66 | |
| 6 | July 14, 2020 | 2 | 67–79 | |
| 7 | October 13, 2020 | 2 | 80–92 | |
| 8 | January 12, 2021 | 2 | 93–105 | |
| 9 | May 25, 2021 | 2 | 106–119 | |
| 10 | September 21, 2021 | 3 | 120–140 | |
| 11 | November 23, 2021 | 2 | 141–155 | |
| 12 | May 17, 2022 | 3 | 156–176 | |
| 13 | September 6, 2022 | 2 | 177–189 | |
| 14 | January 10, 2023 | 3 | 190–210 | |
| 15 | June 13, 2023 | 3 | 211–231 | |
| 16 | November 14, 2023 | 3 | 232–255 | |
| 17 | March 26, 2024 | 3 | 256–273 | |
| 18 | August 13, 2024 | 3 | 274–293 | |

Madman Entertainment (Australia and New Zealand) Parts (Region B / 4)
| Part | Release date | | Discs | Episodes | Ref. |
| Part | Blu-ray | DVD | Discs | Episodes | Ref. |
|---|---|---|---|---|---|
| 1 | July 10, 2019 | November 6, 2019 | 2 | 1–13 | |
| 2 | November 6, 2019 | | 2 | 14–26 + OVA | |
| 3 | January 22, 2020 | | 2 | 27–39 | |
| 4 | April 15, 2020 | | 2 | 40–52 | |
| 5 | July 8, 2020 | | 2 | 53–66 | |
| 6 | October 7, 2020 | | 2 | 67–79 | |
| 7 | January 13, 2021 | | 2 | 80–92 | |
| 8 | May 5, 2021 | | 2 | 93–105 | |
| 9 | July 7, 2021 | | 2 | 106–119 | |
| 10 | December 1, 2021 | | 3 | 120–140 | |
| 11 | March 9, 2022 | | 2 | 141–155 | |
| 12 | August 3, 2022 | | 3 | 156–176 | |
| 13 | March 8, 2023 | | 2 | 177–189 | |
| 14 | March 6, 2024 | | 3 | 190–210 | |
| 15 | August 7, 2024 | | 3 | 211–231 | |
| 16 | June 4, 2025 | | 3 | 232–255 | |

Collections (Region B)
| Collection | Release date | Discs | Episodes | Ref. |
|---|---|---|---|---|
| 1 | April 5, 2023 | 8 | 1–52 + OVA | |
| 2 | January 8, 2025 | 8 | 53–105 | |

Manga Entertainment (United Kingdom, Region B)
| Set | Release date | Discs | Episodes | Ref. |
|---|---|---|---|---|
| 1 | August 19, 2019 | 2 | 1–13 | |
| 2 | December 9, 2019 | 2 | 14–26 + OVA | |
| 3 | June 1, 2020 | 2 | 27–39 | |
| 4 | August 10, 2020 | 2 | 40–52 | |
