= Macross =

Mecha anime franchise

- The original Super Dimension Fortress Macross series logo
- Created by: Studio Nue; Artland; Shōji Kawamori; Kenichi Matsuzaki
- Original work: Super Dimension Fortress Macross
- Owner: Big West

Print publications
- Book: Macross The Ride

Films and television
- Films: Macross: Do You Remember Love?; Macross Plus: Movie Edition; Macross 7: The Galaxy is Calling Me!; Macross Fb7 Listen to My Song!; Macross Frontier: The False Songstress; Macross Frontier: The Wings of Farewell; Macross Delta: Passionate Walküre; Macross Frontier: Labyrinth of Time; Macross Delta: Zettai Live!!!!!!
- Animated series: Super Dimension Fortress Macross; Macross 7; Macross Frontier; Macross Delta
- Direct-to-video: Flash Back 2012; Macross II: Lovers Again; Macross Plus; Macross 7: Encore; Macross Dynamite 7; Macross Zero

Games
- Video games: List of Macross video games; Macross (Famicom); Super Spacefortress Macross; Scrambled Valkyrie; Do You Remember Love?; Macross (PlayStation 2); Macross Ace Frontier; Macross 30: Voices across the Galaxy

Macross (マクロス, Makurosu) is a Japanese science fiction mecha anime media franchise, created by Studio Nue (most prominently mecha designer, writer and producer Shōji Kawamori) and Artland in 1982. The franchise features a fictional history of Earth and the human race after the year 1999, as well as the history of humanoid civilization in the Milky Way. It consists of four TV series, nine movies, six OVAs, and multiple light novel and manga series, all produced and sponsored by Big West, in addition to 40 video games set in the Macross universe, two crossover games, and a wide variety of physical merchandise.

Within the series, the term Macross is used to denote the main capital ship. This theme began in the original Macross, Super Dimension Fortress Macross.

"Overtech" refers to the scientific advances discovered in an alien starship ASS-1 (Alien Star Ship-One later renamed Super Dimension Fortress-One Macross) that crashed on South Ataria island. Humans were able to reverse engineer the technology to create the mecha (variable fighters and destroids), faster-than-light space fold drive for starships and other advanced technologies that the series features.

== Title ==
The series title comes from the name of the main human spacecraft (which is usually shortened from Super Dimension Fortress Macross to "SDF-1" or The Macross as it is the first). The original name for the Macross project was Battle City Megarōdo (or Battle City Megaroad, as the Japanese transliteration to either "L" or "R" gives the title a double meaning in reference to the story line: Megaload, referring to the spacecraft containing an entire city of people; and Megaroad, referring to the long journey through space back to Earth); however, one of the sponsors of the project, Big West Advertising, was a fan of Shakespeare and wanted the series and the spacecraft to be named Macbeth (マクベス, Makubesu). A compromise was made with the title Macross (マクロス, Makurosu) due to its similar pronunciation to Macbeth in Japanese and because it still contained connotations to the original title. The word Macross comes from a wordplay combination of the prefix "macro" in reference to its massive size in comparison to human vehicles (though when compared with the alien ships in the series, it is a relatively small gun destroyer) and the distance they must cross.

== Themes ==
The following are themes commonly seen and established among the various series in the Macross franchise.

=== U.N. Spacy ===
U.N. Spacy Roundel

The U.N. Spacy (統合宇宙軍, Tōgō Uchūgun) is a fictional space military arm of the Earth Unified Government (地球統合政府, Chikyū Tōgō Seifu). It was established by the successor to the modern United Nations in order to defend Earth from a possible attack by hostile aliens, and was involved in Space War I against an extraterrestrial race called the Zentradi. Later operations of the U.N. Spacy expanded into interstellar colonization and general peacekeeping of off-world Earth settlements.

The term "Spacy" is a portmanteau of the terms Space and Army or Navy. Some Japanese sources also use the term Space Army and some English-language sources use the term Space Navy, suggesting that the term is a contraction.

=== Variable fighters ===
The valkyrie fighter is one of a series of transformable aerospace fighters, primarily designed by franchise creator Shōji Kawamori and Kazutaka Miyatake. They are generally able to transform into jet/space fighters, Battroid (a humanoid robot) and a hybrid of the two modes, called Gerwalk (Ground Effective Reinforcement of Winged Armament with Locomotive Knee-joint). The VF-1 was specifically named "Valkyrie", but all of the jet fighter craft have generically been referred to as such in the series since then.

=== Music ===
Music is integral part to almost every Macross title by having significances in a series' antagonists behavior towards it. Music idols also play a central role to various Macross stories. Often, the protagonist will be involved in a love triangle with a series' music idol; most notably, Lynn Minmay.

=== Space fold ===
Space folding permits nearly-instantaneous ultra-long distance travel: a space-fold transports a spacecraft in a very short amount of time by first swapping the location of the spacecraft with super dimension space or subspace, and then swapping the Super Dimension space with the space at the destination.

According to U.N. Spacy First Lieutenant Hayase Misa during Space War I (2009–2012) an hour passes in super dimension space as approximately ten days passes in normal space. One of the latest Macross TV series, Macross Frontier, further expands on that concept by introducing fold faults or dislocations, which further retard fold travel and interfere with fold communications. Also explained in Macross Frontier are the limitations of space folding, such as the geometric increase in energy requirement with the mass of the object to be folded, which prevents very large objects from being folded with ease across vast distances.

The act of entering Super Dimension space is called "fold in". When arriving at the destination, the act of leaving Super Dimension space is called a "defold" or a "fold out".

=== Ancient astronauts ===
The metaplot of the franchise is centered on a purportedly extinct humanoid alien race called the Protoculture (プロトカルチャー, Purotokaruchā). It was first conceptualized during the pre-production of The Super Dimension Fortress Macross when the creators were researching cultural studies to develop concepts used in the plot.

According to official sources, the Protoculture was the first advanced humanoid race in the universe—advanced Protoculture civilization started 500,000 years ago—and is the creator of the Zentradi and Homo sapiens. Phases of colonization resulted in the establishment of an "Interstellar Republic" (similar to a galactic empire), which covers much of the Milky Way galaxy 2800 years after Protoculture civilization started (498,000 years ago).

A civil war happened sixty years later, resulting in a split in the Republic. One of the factions created "super-Zentradi" forces, which was later possessed by interdimensional beings—these forces are later called the "Protodeviln", which feeds on life energy of both Protoculture and Zentradi; some of both the Protoculture and Zentradi was later brainwashed into the "Supervision Army".

The Supervision Army continued to battle both the Protoculture and Zentradi, which resulted in the dwindling of Protoculture population; they revoked the prime directive that banned Zentradi from attacking the Supervision Army. This, however, made the war even more intense, and the Protoculture population sharply decreased; to avoid extinction, they seeded uninhabited planets by means of pantropy and avoided any conflict as much as possible. This action included the genetic engineering of Homo sapiens on Earth by combining Protoculture genes with native genes; a "sub-Protoculture" race meant for preparing the Earth for a future Protoculture colonization. The genetic engineering crew, however, was immediately destroyed by anti–Interstellar Republic military ships.

The final blow of the war happened because of the Protoculture lost control of the Zentradi; 475,000 years ago, the Protoculture was believed extinct. However it was discovered that 10,000 years ago, the Protoculture remnants made contact with humans on Mayan Island, genetically re-engineering the native inhabitants to utilize the artifacts left behind by them. This included the "Bird Human" bio-mecha, tasked to destroy humanity if they are still in war.

=== Other elements ===
The franchise also explores minor themes including culture shock, capitalism, coming of age and nostalgia.

The new era following the end of Space War I is part of the ongoing fictional time-line of the Macross franchise. The most recent series, Macross Delta, is set 59 years after the start of the war with the Zentradi. Its main plot is about the spread of a rage virus on a star system and the combined efforts of singing idols and valkyrie fighters to stop it spreading.

Along with Gundam, a real robot mecha series of which Shoji Kawamori is a fan, Macross explored how individuals cope with warfare. Whereas Gundam is far more political and direct on the horrors of war, each Macross television series is known for never depicting the antagonists as inherently evil and proved in the end that love, culture, and music can be used to resolve their conflicts.

== Series chronology ==
Several sequel series and one prequel have followed. Most use a chronology created by the Studio Nue creators, and those that followed their own chronologies were regarded as "parallel storylines" by the studio. Several different studios were involved with Studio Nue in the Macross franchise along the years, but since 2002's Macross Zero, production has been handled exclusively between Nue and Satelight, from which Shōji Kawamori is one of the main key members. The main of Macross production consists of (in chronological release order):

Release dates	Episodes	Work	Title (original)	Chronology
1982/10 to 1983/06	36	TV series	Super Dimension Fortress Macross; Original work adapted by Harmony Gold to become Robotech: The Macross Saga in 1985.	2009–2012
1984/07	—N/a	Movie	Macross: Do You Remember Love? Alternate telling of the events in Super Dimension Fortress Macross, specifically episodes 2 through 27.	2009–2012 / 2031 (story within a story in Macross 7)
1987/06	1	OVA	The Super Dimension Fortress Macross: Flash Back 2012; Epilogue of the 1984 movie, segments were added in the movie's definitive "Perfect Edition".	2012
1992/05 to 1992/11	6	OVA series	Super Dimensional Fortress Macross II: Lovers Again "Macross 10th Anniversary"; Sequel to the 1982 TV series, created without Studio Nue.	2092 "parallel" world alternate continuity
1994/08 to 1995/06	4	OVA series	Macross Plus; Sequel to the 1982 TV series, created by Studio Nue. A side-story.	2040
1995/03 to 1995/07	4	OVA series	Macross Plus: International Version; Alternative version of the OVA with English cast and songs.	2040
1994/10 to 1995/09	49	TV series	Macross 7 Sequel to Macross Plus. First of the sequels to touch upon the metaplot. Features a new cast of characters, and only three returning characters from the original 1982 TV series.	2045-46
1994/10 to 2001/05	8 volumes	Manga series	Macross 7: Trash; Comic side-story first serialized in Shōnen Ace magazine then released as volumes.	2046
1995/09	—N/a	Movie	Macross Plus: Movie Edition; Alternative movie version of the OVA, with different editing and additional scenes.	2040
1995/09	—N/a	Movie	Macross 7: The Galaxy is Calling Me!	2046
1995/12	3	OVA	Macross 7: Encore; Three sequel episodes to the 1994 TV series.	2046
1997/12 to 1998/08	4	OVA series	Macross Dynamite 7 "Macross 15th Anniversary"; Sequel to the 1994 TV series.	2047
2002/12 to 2004/10	5	OVA series	Macross Zero "Macross 20th Anniversary"; Prequel to the original 1982 TV series.	2008
2007/12 to 2009/11	5 volumes	Manga series	Macross Frontier Manga; Comic format telling of the events in Macross Frontier first serialized in Shōnen Ace magazine.	2059
2007/12	1	TV series pilot	Macross Frontier: Close Encounter – Deculture Edition "Macross 25th Anniversary"; Pilot episode for the sequel to the 1994 TV series.	2059
2008/04 to 2008/09	25	TV series	Macross Frontier "Macross 25th Anniversary"; Sequel to the 1994 TV series.	2059
2009/1 to 2014/4	6 volumes	Manga series	Macross: The First; Comic format alternate telling of the events in The Super Dimension Fortress Macross serialized in Macross Ace magazine and actually Newtype Ace.	2009–2012
2009/11/21	—N/a	Movie	Macross Frontier: The False Songstress; Theatrical movie adaptation of the 2008 TV series.	2059
2010/12 to 2011/11	12	Novels	Macross The Ride; Prequel to the 2008 TV series.	2058
2011/02/26	—N/a	Movie	Macross Frontier: The Wings of Farewell; Sequel to the 2009 theatrical movie, a continuing adaptation of the 2008 TV series.	2059
2012/10/3-8	—N/a	Musical	Macross The Musicalture; 30th anniversary Tokyo Dome live music show.	2062
2012/10/20	—N/a	Movie	Macross Fb7 Listen to My Song! "Macross Dynamite 7 15th Anniversary"; Adaptation of Macross 7 from the perspective of Macross Frontier characters.	2059
2013/02/28	—N/a	Video game	Macross 30: Voices across the Galaxy "Macross 30th Anniversary"; Video game sequel to Macross Frontier.	2060
2016/04 to 2016/09	26	TV series	Macross Delta; TV sequel to both Macross 30 and Macross Frontier.	2067
2018/02/09	—N/a	Movie	Macross Delta: Passionate Walküre; Compilation movie of Macross Delta, with some changes.	2067
2021/08/08	—N/a	Movie	Macross Delta: Zettai Live!!!!!! Sequel to Macross Delta: Passionate Walküre.	2067

A feature film, subtitled Do You Remember Love? (愛・おぼえていますか Ai Oboete Imasu ka), was released in 1984, with a condensed version of the storyline and cutting-edge animation. This movie was later described as a "historical drama" movie within the Macross universe (similar to World War II films in the real world). In Macross Plus and Macross 7, it is revealed that there was a movie produced after Space War I (the original Earth-Zentradi conflict). Kawamori described the relation between the two depictions of Space War I: "The real Macross is out there, somewhere. If I tell the story in the length of a TV series, it looks one way, and if I tell it as a movie-length story, it's organized another way." (An edited, English-dubbed version of the feature was also released to video as Clash of the Bionoids.)

Macross II, the only animated project without Studio Nue's direct involvement, was declared by Studio Nue to be a parallel-world story.

In March 2007, Studio Victor placed a casting call for a voice actress to play the heroine Ranka Lee, in a then untitled new Macross series. Eighteen-year-old Megumi Nakajima was selected in the nationwide singing and acting audition for the role of Ranka Lee in Japan. The project was given the tentative title of Macross 25. Later, as part of the 25th anniversary concert, a trailer was shown that revealed the new tentative title of Macross F (Frontier). During the concert, Kawamori Shoji mentioned that the timeframe of Macross Frontier was about 2070 AD. Kawamori also announced that Yoko Kanno would be the music co-composer of the new Macross series. According to Newtype magazine, this new series were supposed to take place in a school. The pilot episode aired on December 23, 2007. The new series were finally set in the year 2059 AD and took place in a new Macross Colony Fleet called "Macross Frontier". The new show was produced by Satelight and its episodes began their regular broadcast on April 4, 2008, in MBS channel of Japan. The final episode aired on September 25, 2008, what brought the series to a total of 25 episodes. A Macross Frontier Movie Edition was announced just after the ending of the new TV animated series.

The Kanto area rerun of the Macross Frontier anime television series during early 2014 in Japan ended with a teaser announcement that a new Macross TV series is in the works, and later in the year was tentatively titled Macross Δ (Delta). Just like for Macross Frontier, a casting call was held for the series' main singer who also became part of the cast. The winner of the contest as well of the rest of the cast and characters were revealed in a special event held on October 29, 2015. A new Macross anime television series was to premiere in 2018, but still hasn't released (as of September 2024). A new Macross series was announced in 2023 to be animated by Sunrise, a division of Bandai Namco Filmworks. It is unknown if this is the previously announced 2018 anime or if this is a completely new project.

On March 2, 2025, Big West and Bandai Namco Filmworks announced through a livestream that songstress auditions for the next Macross series had officially begun and that submissions for the first round would be open until April 30. This audition was limited to only women ages 13 to 22. In that same livestream, it was revealed that FlyingDog and Lantis would be responsible for the music of the series. The first round audition song was "Ai to Ai" by Fuwari and the contest featured prior franchise artists and guests performing the song during the duration of the audition.

=== Macross fictional chronology ===
Several sequel series and prequels have followed in Macross. The main Macross productions consists of (in fictional chronological timeline order):

Time period	Title (original)	Work	Release dates	Episodes
1999	Super Dimension Fortress Macross (Prologue only); Original work adapted by Harmony Gold to become Robotech: The Macross Saga in 1985.	TV series	1982/10 to 1983/6	36
2002–2010	Misa Hayase: White Reminiscences	Novels	1984/2	—N/a
2008	Macross Zero; Original Macross origin story	OVA series	2002/12 to 2004/10	5
2009	Dreaming Prelude: My Fair Minmay	Novels	1983/4	—N/a
2009–2012	Super Dimension Fortress Macross; Original work adapted by Harmony Gold to become Robotech: The Macross Saga in 1985.	TV series	1982/10 to 1983/6	36
2009–2012	Macross: The First; Comic format alternate telling of the events in Super Dimension Fortress Macross serialized in Macross Ace magazine and actually Newtype Ace.	Manga	2009/1 to 2014/4	6 volumes
2010	Macross Inside Story: Macross Classic	Audio drama	1996/8	4
2012, 2031 (story within a story)	Macross: Do You Remember Love? Alternate telling of the events in The Super Dimension Fortress Macross, specifically episodes 2 through 27. Canon in-universe as a fictional movie.	Movie	1984/7	—N/a
2012	The Super Dimension Fortress Macross: Flash Back 2012; Epilogue of the Macross: Do You Remember Love?, segments were added in the movie's definitive "Perfect Edition".	OVA	1987/6	—N/a
2014–2030	Macross M3	Video game	2001/2	—N/a
2040	Macross Plus; Original Macross sequel OVA created by Studio Nue. A side-story.	OVA series	1994/8 to 1995/9	5
2043	Macross: True Love Song	Video game	2000/3	—N/a
2045	Macross 7 Docking Festival: Singing Saves the Galaxy!?	Audio drama	1995/3	—N/a
2045–2046	Macross 7 TV series sequel to The Super Dimension Fortress Macross. First of the sequels to touch upon the metaplot. Features a new cast of characters, and only three returning characters from the original series.	TV series	1994/10 to 1995/9	49
2046	Macross 7: Trash	Manga	1995/5 to 2001/7	8 volumes
2046	Macross 7: The Galaxy is Calling Me!	Movie	1995/9	—N/a
2046	Macross 7: Encore; OVA series sequel to Macross 7	OVA series	1995/12 to 1996/2	3
2046	Macross Generation	Audio drama	1997/4	10
2047	Macross Digital Mission VF-X	Video game	1997/2	—N/a
2047	Macross Dynamite 7 Macross 7 OVA sequel	OVA series	1997/12 to 1998/8	4
2050	Macross VF-X2	Video game	1999/9	—N/a
2058	Macross The Ride	Novels	2010/12 to 2011/11	12
2059	Macross Frontier	TV series	2008/4 to 2008/9	25
2059	Super Dimension Song Maiden Ranka	Manga	2008/10	1 volume
2059	Macross Frontier: The False Songstress; Macross Frontier theatrical movie adaptation.	Movie	2009/11	—N/a
2059	Sheryl: Kiss in the Galaxy	Manga	2010/9 to 2012/10	4 volumes
2059	Macross Frontier: The Wings of Farewell; Macross Frontier theatrical movie adaptation and sequel to The False Songstress.	Movie	2011/2	—N/a
2059	Macross Frontier: Hold Me Tightly to the Edge of the Galaxy	Manga	2012/9	1 volume
2059	Macross Fb7 Listen to My Song! Macross 7 & Macross Frontier crossover special.	Movie	2012/10	—N/a
2059	Macross Fortissimo	Manga	2013/3	1 volume
2060	Macross 30: Voices across the Galaxy	Video game	2013/2	—N/a
2062	Macross The Musicalture; Macross 30th anniversary live music show.	Musical	2012/10	—N/a
2067	Macross Delta; TV sequel to both Macross 30 and Macross Frontier.	TV series	2016/04 to 2016/09	26
2067	Macross Delta: Passionate Walküre; Compilation movie of Macross Delta, with some changes.	Movie	2018/02/09	—N/a
2067	Macross Delta: Zettai Live!!!!!! Sequel to Macross Delta: Passionate Walküre.	Movie	2021/08/08	—N/a
2092	Macross II; Original Macross sequel OVA created without Studio Nue and considered an alternate universe by them.	OVA series	1992/5 to 1992/11	6

== Video games ==
Macross video games are based on its universe, sometimes expanding it with original characters and sidestories; latest games often include newly created anime footage, and all of them were exclusively released in Japan; except a Takatoku Toys handheld electronic game distributed by Incoming Trading, a Banpresto arcade game licensed by Fabtek, and a Bandai Visual PlayStation game whose debuted North American localization was eventually cancelled probably due to copyrights issues involving Harmony Gold.

See the list of Macross video games for all the official and crossover releases from the 1980s up to the 2010s.

== Legal complications with international distribution ==
Harmony Gold purchased the international distribution rights for the Macross series and between 1999 and 2003 filed trademarks on the distribution of Macross merchandise and media outside of Japan. Harmony Gold's international distribution rights are under dispute however as they bought the rights from the Japanese company, Tatsunoko Production, which in a court ruling against companies, Studio Nue and Big West, was ruled to have only the rights to the international distribution of The Super Dimension Fortress Macross and no legal claim to the rest of the franchise; those belonging to the latter companies. Harmony Gold claims that the case does not apply to them since it occurred in Japan and does not apply to the international distribution rights. Harmony Gold continued to re-affirm their claim to the international distribution through cease and desist letters, resulting in later Macross series not being distributed outside of Japan.

On March 1, 2021, Big West, Studio Nue, and Harmony Gold came to an agreement. Harmony Gold would no longer hinder Big West's distribution of Macross properties outside Japan and Harmony Gold would be allowed to release their upcoming Robotech film in Japan.

Starting in August 2024, Macross was made available via Disney+ for streaming worldwide outside the US (via the Star hub), with the exception of the Super Dimension Fortress Macross and Do You Remember Love? that are currently available only in Japan. On January 13, 2025, it was made available in the US via Hulu.

Streaming on Disney+ is only occurring in Japan and some Asian and English-speaking countries, with English, Chinese and Korean subtitles. The last roll out was for the US in January 2025. It's unknown when, or even if, Disney+ is planning to expand it to more territories with more languages.

In 2026, at Big West's Macross panel at New York Comic Con, it was announced that the rights to Do You Remember Love? would finally be included as part of the worldwide rights, with further details to be revealed later on.

== Legacy ==
Macross was the basis for the Robotech franchise in North America. Super Dimension Fortress Macross was adapted into the first saga of the Robotech television series (1985–1986), called The Macross Saga, which spawned the Robotech franchise. Robotech was influential in the Western world, helping to introduce the anime medium to North America.

Several Macross designs were used in early editions of BattleTech, however after legal disputes with Harmony Gold these designs were removed from the game resulting in the original Macross designs being referred to as "The Unseen." Harmony Gold would continue legal cases against BattleTech until the mid-2010's, taking aim at BattleTech's visual redesigns of the Macross derived mechs. In 2018, a case from Harmony Gold against video game developers Harebrained Schemes and Piranha Games was dismissed with prejudice; and the BattleTech franchise continues to use mechs inspired by but visually distinct from their Macross "Unseen" originals.

Macross popularized the concept of transforming mecha, which can transform between a standard vehicle (such as a fighter plane or transport truck) and a fighting mecha robot. Shōji Kawamori introduced the concept with Diaclone in 1980 and then popularized it with Macross. Kawamori then went on to design transforming mecha for Transformers (1986). The transforming mecha concept became popular in the mid-1980s, with Macross: Do You Remember Love? (1984) and Zeta Gundam (1985) in Japan, and with Robotech and Transformers in the West. Transformers went on to influence the Hollywood movie industry.

In contrast to earlier mecha anime which focused on combatants, Macross portrayed mecha conflict from the perspective of non-combatant civilians, such as the singer Lynn Minmay. Voiced by Mari Iijima, Minmay was the first fictional idol singer to garner major real-world success, with the theme song "Do You Remember Love?" (from the film Macross: Do You Remember Love?) reaching number seven on the Oricon music charts in Japan. This was later further explored in Macross Plus with the virtual idol Sharon Apple, an artificial intelligence (AI) computer program who takes the form of an intergalactic pop star, and in Macross 7 with the virtual band Fire Bomber who became a commercial success and spawned multiple CDs released in Japan. Macross set the template for later virtual idols in the early 21st century, such as Hatsune Miku and Kizuna Ai.

Another innovative character concept in Macross was the role of Misa Hayase in Super Dimension Fortress Macross, who was one of the main commanders of the Macross battleship. She was the commanding officer of the fighter pilot protagonist Hikaru Ichijyo, and later his love interest. This was a scenario Kawamori came up with which he had not seen in any Hollywood movies before. A similar scenario, however, later appeared in the Hollywood movie Top Gun (1986). According to Kawamori, "Many people pointed out that later films like Top Gun copied that idea and setting, as well as including the combination of many songs and fighters too."

A geological feature on Charon, one of Pluto's moons, is informally known as the Macross Chasma.
