= Macross Frontier =

2008 anime series

- DVD cover of Macross Frontier

マクロスF(フロンティア) (Makurosu Furontia)
- Genre: Musical, romance, space opera
- Created by: Studio Nue; Shōji Kawamori
- Manga
- Illustrated by: Aoki Hayato
- Published by: Kadokawa Shoten
- Magazine: Shōnen Ace
- Original run: December 26, 2007 – November 26, 2009
- Volumes: 5
- Anime television series
- Directed by: Yasuhito Kikuchi; Shōji Kawamori
- Produced by: Hiroo Maruyama; Daiki Hasebe (Bandai Visual); Shinichi Hirai; Hirofumi Morotomi
- Written by: Hiroyuki Yoshino; Shōji Kawamori
- Music by: Yoko Kanno
- Studio: Satelight
- Licensed by: Big West (licensing) Disney Platform Distribution (worldwide streaming license); NA: Anime Limited (home video); UK: Anime Limited (home video)
- Original network: MBS, CBC, TBS, TBC, SBS, RCC, RKK
- Original run: April 4, 2008 – September 26, 2008
- Episodes: 25
Further information
Anime television film
Macross Frontier: Close Encounter - Deculture Edition
Directed by	Yasuhito Kikuchi; Shōji Kawamori
Studio	Satelight
Original network	MBS, TBS
Released	December 23, 2007
Runtime	27 minutes
Manga
Macross F Chō Jikū Uta Miko Ranka
Illustrated by	Kuroiwa Yoshihiro
Published by	Kadokawa Shoten
Magazine	Comp Ace
Original run	February 26, 2008 – May 26, 2008
Light novel
Written by	Ukyō Kodachi
Illustrated by	Risa Ebata; Hayato Aoki
Published by	Kadokawa Shoten
Imprint	Kadokawa Sneaker Bunko
Original run	July 1, 2008 – March 1, 2009
Volumes	4
Manga
Macross F Dakishimete, Ginga no Hate Made
Illustrated by	Sorahiko Mizushima
Published by	Kadokawa Shoten
Magazine	Comp Ace
Original run	July 26, 2008 – Feb 26, 2009
Anime film
Macross Frontier: The False Songstress
Directed by	Shōji Kawamori
Produced by	Shinichi Hirai; Hisanori Kunisaki
Written by	Hiroyuki Yoshino; Shōji Kawamori
Music by	Yoko Kanno
Studio	Satelight; Eight Bit
Licensed by	Big West (licensing) Disney Platform Distribution (worldwide streaming license); NA: Anime Limited (home video); UK: Anime Limited (home video)
Released	November 21, 2009
Runtime	120 minutes
Manga
Sheryl~Kiss in the Galaxy
Illustrated by	Kariko Koyama
Published by	Kodansha
Magazine	Bessatsu Friend
Original run	September 13, 2010 – October 10, 2012
Volumes	4
Anime film
Macross Frontier: The Wings of Farewell
Directed by	Shōji Kawamori
Produced by	Shinichi Hirai; Hisanori Kunisaki
Written by	Hiroyuki Yoshino; Shōji Kawamori
Music by	Yoko Kanno
Studio	Satelight
Licensed by	Big West (licensing) Disney Platform Distribution (worldwide streaming license); NA: Anime Limited (home video); UK: Anime Limited (home video)
Released	February 26, 2011
Runtime	115 minutes
Anime film
Macross Frontier: Labyrinth of Time
Directed by	Shōji Kawamori
Written by	Shoji Kawamori
Music by	Yoko Kanno
Studio	Satelight
Licensed by	Big West (licensing) Disney Platform Distribution (worldwide streaming license)
Released	October 8, 2021
Runtime	14 minutes

Macross Frontier (マクロスF(フロンティア), Makurosu Furontia) is a Japanese anime television series and the third Japanese anime television series set in the Macross universe. It was broadcast on MBS from April 4, 2008, to September 26, 2008.

Macross Frontier is the story of a human space colony fleet trying to find a habitable planet near the center of the Milky Way. The story focuses on three young adults (a famed pop singer, a private military pilot, and a rising pop singer) and the events that occur around them as the fleet faces a crisis of alien origin.

== Plot ==
The series features the 25th New Macross-class Colonial Fleet, dubbed the Macross Frontier, en route to the galactic center. This heavily populated interstellar fleet (consisting of numerous civilian vessels and their military escorts) contains a makeup of both human occupants and their Zentradi allies. As such, many of the Macross Frontier's companion vessels appear to merge more metallic Human designs with organic Zentradi aesthetics. Macross Frontier's plot explores a combination of action/political intrigue/space drama more than previous Macross series have done in the past.

As the series begins, during a mission to an unexplored asteroid belt, a reconnaissance New U.N. Spacy (N.U.N.S.) VF-171 is destroyed by an extremely powerful and fast insectoid biomechanical alien mecha known as the "Vajra" which immediately begin their attack on the rest of the fleet. Unable to stop the new enemy threat, the N.U.N.S. Colonial Defense Forces authorizes the deployment of a private military provider organization called S.M.S. (Strategic Military Services) which utilizes the new VF-25 Messiah variable fighter to combat the alien menace.

== Media ==
=== Anime ===
The series was animated by Satelight and was broadcast in Japan on MBS from April 4, 2008, to September 26, 2008. A pre-broadcast airing titled Macross Frontier: Close Encounter - Deculture Edition or Macross Special Edition (マクロスSP版, Makurosu SP Ban), showcasing a preview version of the first episode was aired on December 23, 2007. The series premiered on satellite television in Japan on Animax on April 7, 2008.

The series started streaming on Disney+ globally (via the Star hub) in 2024. The series started streaming on Hulu in the United States on January 13, 2025.

=== Manga ===
Four separate manga adaptations were run in Shōnen Ace, Comp Ace and Bessatsu Friend, starting in December 2007, February 2008, July 2008, and September 2010, respectively.

=== Others ===
Macross Trial Frontier
- Developer: Artdink
- Publisher: Bandai Namco Games
- Series: Macross
- Platform: PlayStation 3
- Release: JP: October 7, 2010; (Alongside Macross Frontier The Movie: The False Songstress Hybrid Pack)
- Genre: Action
- Mode: Single-player

Macross Last Frontier
- Developer: Artdink
- Publisher: Bandai Namco Games
- Series: Macross
- Platform: PlayStation 3
- Release: JP: October 20, 2011; (Alongside Macross Frontier The Movie: The Wings of Goodbye Hybrid Pack)
- Genre: Action
- Mode: Single-player

==== Radio Macross ====
Radio Macross is a radio program, based on Macross Frontier, which was first broadcast on Bunka Hōsō and MBS Radio on January 3, 2008. It has featured Megumi Nakajima and Kenta Miyake, voice actors for the characters Ranka Lee and Bobby Margot, as hosts.

==== Macross Fufonfia ====
Macross Fufonfia is a series of Flash-based 90-second promotional shorts developed by Satelight and sponsored by Mainichi Broadcasting System where characters from Macross Frontier are portrayed as office ladies and employees at the "Frontier Software Company". While not exactly standard anime, more a sort of paper cut-out animation, these ONA shorts are a fun spoof of the original series intended to promote the show. The series was aired in 2007 and featured 20 episodes.

==== Macross Frontier: The False Songstress ====
A theatrical version of the Macross Frontier anime television series was announced in Japan during the broadcast of the 25th and final episode "Your Sound" ("Anata no Oto") on September 25, 2008. According to interviews with Shōji Kawamori the movie was to be an adaptation of the story from the television series. Japanese anime magazine Animedia had originally announced that the film was to be released during the summer of 2009. Other reports later placed the premiere in the fall of 2009. That report was confirmed by an itasha (vehicle decorated with character art) mini-van outside the "Macross: The Super Dimension Space Launching Ceremony" event that took place on February 22, 2009, in Japan. However, at that point, the creator Shoji Kawamori and the cast members Yuuichi Nakamura (Alto Saotome), Aya Endo (Sheryl Nome), and Megumi Nakajima (Ranka Lee) noted on the actual event, that the new date and the title were still subjected to changes.

The theatrical film adaptation of Macross Frontier opened in Japan on November 21, 2009, under the name Macross Frontier: The False Songstress (劇場版 マクロスF 虚空歌姫 〜イツワリノウタヒメ〜, Gekijōban Makurosu Furontia Itsuwari no Utahime). The Kadokawa Cineplex and Shochiku Multiplex theaters' websites revealed the title and date, and the second issue of Kadokawa Shoten's Macross Ace magazine eventually published the details on June 26, 2009. The teaser trailer for the film premiered in Japanese theaters on June 27, 2009 (the same day ticket pre-sales began in Japan). The first movie retells the events of the anime from episodes 1 to 13, with significant alterations to the story and timeline of the television series.

A Blu-ray Disc release of the movie, titled Macross Frontier The Movie: The False Songstress Hybrid Pack, was released on October 7, 2010. The Blu-ray release contains the Blu-ray jacket, the hybrid disc, a 48-page artwork booklet, a theatrical release archive, and a card featuring frames from the movie. The pack also included a code that allowed the owner to be entered into a contest to attend the Macross F Christmas Live event that year. A PS3 game titled Macross Trial Frontier is included in the Hybrid Pack, playable on the PlayStation 3. A standard DVD was also released in the same day. Later Namco Bandai (now Bandai Namco Holdings) released the Macross Frontier the Movie 30th d Shudisuta b Box on May 15, 2014.

==== Macross Frontier: The Wings of Farewell ====
The official website of the Macross Frontier anime series has confirmed that there will be two theatrical Macross Frontier films. While The False Songstress primarily reedited footage from the show's initial 13 episodes, the second film, titled Macross Frontier: The Wings of Farewell (劇場版 マクロスF 恋離飛翼 〜サヨナラノツバサ〜, Gekijōban Makurosu Furontia Sayonara no Tsubasa), diverges significantly from the events of the television series, featuring entirely new animation and new music. In the Macross Frontier Girasama Festival, the movie's release date is confirmed to be on February 26, 2011. The Wings of Farewell provides an original story and an alternate conclusion to Frontier, following directly off of The False Songstress.

Blu-ray and DVD editions of the movie were released by Bandai Namco Games on October 20, 2011. The Blu-ray version is still a Hybrid Pack, the same as the first movie released in Blu-ray. A PS3 game titled Macross Last Frontier is included in the Hybrid Pack, and it can be played when the disc is in the PlayStation 3. Later, Namco Bandai (now Bandai Namco Holdings) released the Macross Frontier the Movie 30th d Shudisuta b Box on May 15, 2014.

==== Macross F Galaxy Tour Final in Budokan ====
In November 2008, a live concert of Macross Frontier's music was performed by May'n, Megumi Nakajima, and Yoko Kanno. A video recording of the concert was released in November 2009, and is available on DVD and Blu-ray Disc.

==== All That VF - Macross 25th Anniversary Air Show (Frontier Edition) ====
Coinciding with both the 25th anniversary of Macross and the Blu-ray releases of volume one of both Macross Zero and Macross Frontier, the official website of Macross Frontier posted two newly animated short films featuring Air Show style demonstrations for both series. People who purchased the first pressings of either Macross Zero or Macross Frontier received a unique code to enter into the website and therefore be able to watch the short film of the respective anime.

== International release ==
Due to the legal dispute over the distribution rights of the Macross franchise, involving Studio Nue and Big West against Harmony Gold, much of the Macross merchandise post 1999, including Macross Frontier, has not received an international release. Until Big West, Studio Nue and Harmony Gold reached an agreement on the international distribution of most Macross sequels and films, on March 1, 2021.

The two Macross Frontier films each received a one-night theatrical release with English subtitles in the United States via Big West and Fathom Events, with The False Songstress shown on June 16, 2022, and The Wings of Farewell shown on June 30, 2022.

== Reception ==
=== Sales ===
The first DVD volume of the series released in Japan by Bandai Visual maintained the #3 spot in the sales chart for two consecutive weeks. It was revealed that about 45,000 Blu-ray Discs and 55,000 DVDs were shipped by Bandai Visual for the first volume. This marked the highest Blu-ray Disc pressing among all Bandai Visual releases. Macross Frontier was also reported to be the first anime television series to ship simultaneously on both disc formats in Japan.

=== Critical reception ===
Writing for The Encyclopedia of Science Fiction, Piotr Konieczny described Macross Frontier as a major commercial revival of the Macross franchise, praising its combination of traditional animation and computer-generated imagery in large-scale space battles and mecha sequences, as well as Yoko Kanno's commercially successful soundtrack. It interpreted the series primarily as a first contact narrative in which failures of communication, human paranoia and deliberate manipulation lead to conflict with the apparently hostile but ultimately non-aggressive Vajra. The encyclopedia particularly highlighted the inversion of the threatening alien hive mind trope, contrasting the Vajra's collective intelligence with a human conspiracy seeking to impose a coercive posthuman group consciousness. It also noted that the series renewed the franchise's optimistic portrayal of music as a means of overcoming divisions between species, while extending this theme to communication with a genuinely nonhumanoid intelligence.

=== Music ===
The original soundtrack of the series, Macross Frontier O.S.T.1 Nyan FRO, made it to #3 in Oricon's's weekly album chart. The album sold over 72,000 copies, becoming the first anime album in eleven years to rank in Japan's top 3. The only anime album to rival these sales was The End of Evangelion soundtrack, released on September 26, 1997.

The first opening single, "Triangular" by Maaya Sakamoto, debuted at #3 in Oricon's weekly singles chart and maintained the spot for three weeks before falling to #6. The second single, "Diamond Crevasse" by May'n, also debuted at #3. The third single, Megumi Nakajima's "Seikan Hikō", reached #5 with 34,501 copies. The fourth single, including the second opening "Lion" and the second ending theme "Northern Cross", sold about 56,000 copies in its first week, reaching #3 as well. These four singles sold a total of over 500,000 copies, marking the start of a "new anime song boom" in Japan.

=== Awards ===
Macross Frontier won the 40th Seiun Award in the Best Dramatic Presentation category. It also received a Tokyo Anime Award for television animation, while Kanno received that year's award for music. Furthermore, Macross Frontier the Movie: The Wings of Farewell also won the 2011 Newtype Anime Awards for Best Anime Film and Theatrical Film Award at the 2011 Animation Kobe (the latter prize was previously awarded to numerous Animated Film including Spirited Away and WALL-E).

=== Other ===
As a tribute to the popularity of the series, Japanese champion cosplay kickboxer Yuichiro Nagashima ("Jienotsu") crossplayed as the character Ranka Lee during one of his tournaments and also in a promotional event for the show.
