= Ichirou Mizuki =

Japanese singer (1948–2022)

Ichirou Mizuki 水木 一郎
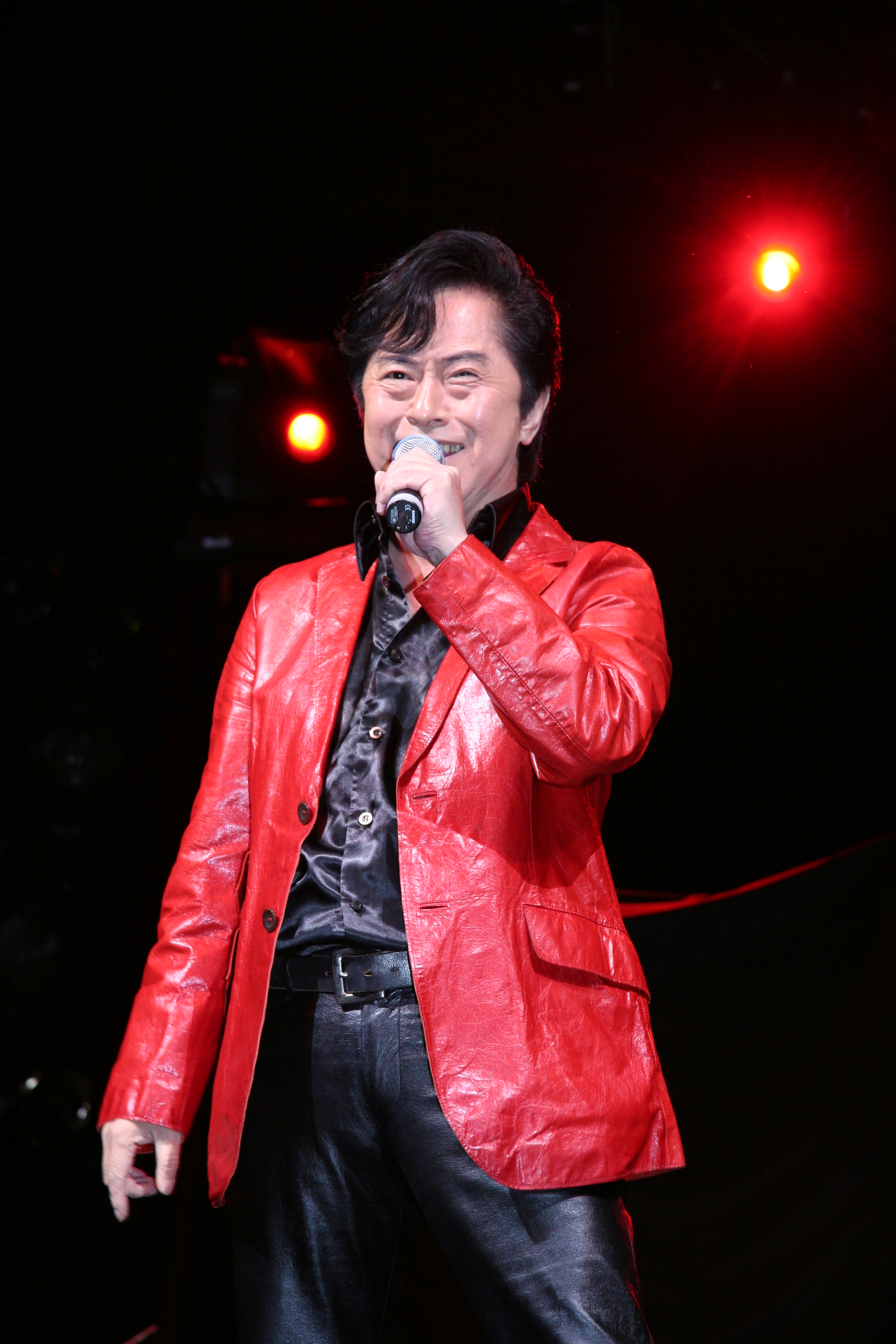
- Mizuki performing in 2007

Background information
- Also known as: Aniki, Aniking, Ichiro Mizuki "Emperor of Anime Songs"
- Born: Toshio Hayakawa (早川俊夫, Hayakawa Toshio); January 7, 1948; Setagaya, Tokyo, Japan
- Died: December 6, 2022 (aged 74) Tokyo, Japan
- Genres: Anison, J-pop, rock, R&B
- Occupations: Singer, lyricist, composer, voice actor, actor
- Years active: 1968–2022
- Labels: Nippon Columbia, First Smile Entertainment, Victor Entertainment, Sony Music Entertainment
- Website: Ichirou Mizuki Official Website

Toshio Hayakawa (早川 俊夫, Hayakawa Toshio; January 7, 1948 – December 6, 2022), better known by his stage name Ichirou Mizuki (水木 一郎, Mizuki Ichirō), was a Japanese singer, lyricist, composer, voice actor and actor best known for his work on theme songs for anime and tokusatsu. For over 50 years, he had recorded over 1,200 songs for Japanese film, television, video and video games. He was referred to by fans and fellow performers alike as the Aniki (アニキ, "big brother") of the anison, or anime music genre. He produced the singing duo Apple Pie since 1990 and created the Anison band JAM Project in 2000.

== Biography ==
=== Career ===
Mizuki was born in Setagaya, Tokyo in January 1948. He signed to the Nippon Columbia label and released his first single called "Kimi ni sasageru Boku no Uta", composed by Kanae Wada, in 1968. In 1971, Mizuki recorded the song "Genshi Shōnen Ryū ga Yuku" (原始少年リュウが行く) which was used as the opening theme for Genshi Shōnen Ryū. This began his foray into recording well over 1200 songs for various soundtracks as well as original singles and albums. Other early songs sung by Mizuki include the themes to Chojin Barom 1, Mazinger Z, Babel II, Robot Detective, Kamen Rider X, Great Mazinger, Ganbare!! Robocon, Kamen Rider Stronger, Tekkaman, Steel Jeeg, Akumaizer 3, Chōdenji Robo Combattler V, Astroganger and Space Pirate Captain Harlock. His extensive discography in the 1970s led to his dubbing as "Aniking (アニキング, Anikingu) and the "Emperor of Anime Songs" (アニメソングの帝王, Anime Songu no Teiō), with whom Mitsuko Horie is the "Queen" and Hironobu Kageyama is the "Prince". Mizuki was also part of the judging panel at the Animax Anison Grand Prix, with Horie and Yumi Matsuzawa.

Mizuki performed theme songs throughout the 1980s and 1990s, for shows such as Beast King GoLion, Getter Robo Go, and Jikuu Senshi Spielban, his work not as extensive until 2000. On July 17, 2000, with fellow anison vocalists Hironobu Kageyama (Dragon Ball Z), Masaaki Endoh (The King of Braves GaoGaiGar), Eizo Sakamoto (vocalist of ANTHEM and Animetal), and Rica Matsumoto (Pokémon), he formed the "supergroup" JAM Project. He later reduced his membership in the group to "part-time", allowing for the entry of Hiroshi Kitadani (One Piece), Masami Okui (Revolutionary Girl Utena), and Yoshiki Fukuyama (Macross 7 as Basara Nekki's in Fire Bomber).

He would return to recording in 2007 with his performances on the soundtrack of Juken Sentai Gekiranger, singing its ending theme "Tao", an image song "Chikai", and on another image song "Burning up! ~Jōnetsu o Uketsui de~" performed as a duet with Takayoshi Tanimoto who sang the series' opening theme. He also sang on JAM Project's single "STORMBRINGER", the opening theme for Kotetsushin Jeeg, a sequel to Steel Jeeg. In 2008, he released his 40th anniversary Ichirou Mizuki: Newest Best album, the Michi ~road~ (道〜road〜) 5-CD box set including 216 songs from his discography, and the TV Size Best album. Other recent releases by Mizuki include two singles for Chōjin Neiger, a local hero from Akita Prefecture. His most recent work is a single for the OVA adaptation of Katteni Kaizō, with its theme song "Katte ni Kaizō Shite mo Ii ze", and an insert song, called "Nuiguruma", featuring Kenji Ohtsuki. In 2016, Mizuki was a recipient of the Lifetime Achievement Award at the Tokyo Anime Awards Festival. In 2017, Mizuki collaborated with Kang Vorakorn, they sang "Miraigar T1" as their final work for Mizuki. In 2020, he received the Tanita Health Award, which "honor[s] individuals or groups that have contributed to improving the health of Japanese people."

On April 25, 2021, it was announced Mizuki was suffering from partial vocal cord paralysis and would focus on recovering from it. In July 2022, Mizuki's management revealed he had been diagnosed with lung cancer that had spread to his lymph nodes and brain. He said he had surgery in June and was undergoing physical therapy and speech therapy. He said he was planning to hold a belated celebration of his 50 years in the music industry, and did not plan to retire.

Mizuki died from lung cancer on December 6, 2022, at the age of 74.

== Television ==
In addition to his career as a vocalist, Mizuki has been cast in several roles as both a voice actor and a live-action actor. As a voice actor, he played the roles of Yoldo in the first episode of the OVA Dangaioh, Rat Hector in Coral no Tanken, and the villain Keisar Ephes in the video game Super Robot Wars Alpha 3. His live-action roles include Dr. Ben in Jikuu Senshi Spielban and (most notably) Voicelugger Gold in Voicelugger, a Tokusatsu show based on the last concept written by Shotaro Ishinomori before his death. He also made a guest appearance on the Japanese comedy television show, Gaki No Tsukai. He voiced the title character Bobobo-bo Bo-bobo in the first PlayStation 2 game of the series, as well as singing the theme song. In 2010, he had a role in an episode of arc of Kamen Rider W along with fellow musicians Aya Kamiki and TAKUYA. In 2012, he starred in one of the episodes in Tokumei Sentai Go-Busters as well as singing "Li-Oh! Kenzan Champion!" which is a theme song for the new robot introduced in the episode. His voice is also used as the voice for the robot's control system.

== Tokusatsu ==
- Voicelugger (Voicelugger Gold)
- Hyakujuu Sentai Gaoranger Movie (Poseidon org (Voice))
- Tokumei Sentai Go-Busters (Custom Visor (Voice), Lio Attache/Lio Blaster (Voice), Saburo Hazuki)

== Books ==
- Hitoshi Hasebe: "Anison - Kashu Ichirou Mizuki Sanjuu Shuunen Kinen Nekketsu Shashinshuu" (兄尊(アニソン)―歌手水木一郎三十周年記念熱血写真集) (1999, Oakla Publishing) ISBN 4-87278-461-8
- Ichirou Mizuki & Project Ichirou: "Aniki Damashii ~Anime Song no Teiou / Mizuki Ichirou no Sho~" (アニキ魂~アニメソングの帝王・水木一郎の書~) (2000, Aspect) ISBN 4-7572-0719-0
