= Local hero (Japan) =

Superhero representing an area of Japan

A local hero (ローカルヒーロー, rōkaru hīrō; also written as gotōchi hīrō (ご当地ヒーロー)) is a Japanese superhero who is created to represent a particular region of Japan, such as a prefecture or city. They often perform in special martial arts stage shows. Created either by local groups or the local government, a local hero is modeled after the superheroes of Japanese tokusatsu. A local hero is often themed around the city or prefecture's local mythologies or industries, are created to teach the children who watch the stage shows certain things (like Recycle Sentai Wakerunger (リサイクル戦隊ワケルンジャー, Risaikuru Sentai Wakerunjā) of Fukui, Fukui Prefecture), or are themed after the event that they are used to promote (the Traffic Sentai Anzenger (トラフィック戦隊アンゼンジャー, Torafikku Sentai Anzenjā) group performed at the Tokyo Motor Show to act in both the latter forms for road traffic safety).

Although local heroes are produced to act in a local area, some gain fame throughout Japan by performing at other local heroes' shows or being featured in mainstream media. Chōjin Neiger (超神ネイガー, Chōjin Neigā; translated as "Super-God Neiger" or "Neiger The Hero") from Nikaho, Akita Prefecture, has had two theme songs recorded by anison recording artist Ichirou Mizuki (the first of which was previously available on the Japanese iTunes Store) and a subsequent EP featuring Mitsuko Horie's vocals. Ryujin Mabuyer (琉神マブヤー, Ryūjin Mabuyā) from Okinawa Prefecture was featured in his own syndicated television series. Maburittokiba (マブリットキバ) from Tōno, Iwate Prefecture, was featured in an episode of the TBS program Kizuna Dining when they visited Tōno and appears at hero shows throughout Japan. The Marimokkori of Hokkaidō has become a popular character throughout Japan, sold as mobile phone charms, claw machine prizes, among other merchandise.

Independent film releases also use the "local hero" motif to present their characters. Crusher Kazuyoshi (クラッシャーカズヨシ, Kurasshā Kazuyoshi) is portrayed as a local hero for Tokyo, and is portrayed by Kazuyoshi Sakai of Hyakujuu Sentai Gaoranger. Anison artist Takayuki Miyauchi performs the second film's theme song. Zan Saber (斬セイバー, Zan Seibā) is a series of DVDs that feature the heroes (Zan Saber, Zan Dagger, Zan Axe) as local heroes of Osaka, starring Ryunosuke Kawai of Tenimyu fame as the lead character.

The anime Tentai Senshi Sunred is based on the local hero theme, featuring the title character as the protector of the city of Kawasaki in Kanagawa Prefecture.

Another TV tokusatsu series, Houjin Yatsurugi was shown as the local hero in Chiba.

In 2008, Symantec created the character of Norton Fighter (ノートンファイター, Nōton Faitā) for its Japanese advertising campaign alongside celebrity otaku Shoko Nakagawa for their new software, including several other characters to go with him. Hironobu Kageyama has recorded a song for Norton Fighter as well titled "Bōei Senshi! Norton Fighter" (防衛戦士！ノートン・ファイター, Bōei Senshi! Nōton Faitā). As a local hero, Norton Fighter is based in the Akihabara region of Tokyo.

During 2020, a new Local Hero series premiered: Dogengers, a show starring a group of Local Heroes from Fukuoka which comprises their leader: Ohgaman, representative of the Ohga Pharmacies, Kitakyuman (Stylized as KitaQMan) and his brother KitaQMan MTL (Metal), who represent Kitakyushu (stylized as KitaQChu), Yamashiron, who stands for the Yamashiro Gas Company, El Brave, representing Hachihata Construction, and Fukuokalibur, the Local Hero that represents Fukuoka's silk artisans. These heroes are joined by Ohgaman's chosen successor, Jiro Tanaka (dubbed "Rookie") as they fight Yabai Kamen and the Secret Society of Darkness, Incorporated, a villain-distributing corporation. The first season was so successful, a second one was made, with mixed reception. Subsequent seasons have added Great-2 to represent Pizza Cooc, MAKO and Kireko of Fukuya Mentaiko, Koujin EX from the Kagoshima prefecture, Bincho Fire from Yakitori Daishizen, a police officer hero named Hyakutoban, and in the sixth season, Korega Knight of Genbaichiba (an online shopping store), and Kaguyano-hime, the true pilot of the Sekigaku-o mecha that represents Seki Furniture.

== See also ==
- Yuru-chara
