= Himekanvas =

Studio album by Himeka
- Released: November 30, 2011
- Recorded: 2009–2011
- Genre: Pop; J-pop
- Label: Sony Music Japan International

Himeka chronology
Love Anison: Utattemita (2010)	Himekanvas (2011)

Himekanvas is the first full length original album released by Canadian J-pop singer Himeka under her new label Sony Music Japan International under the mononym HIMEKA on November 2, 2011. The album has 2 versions: A CD-only version and a limited CD+DVD version. The CD+DVD version contains a DVD of all her PVs, and on the CD it has 2 cover songs: one song she sang in her final at the Animax Anison Grand Prix, and the other is a piano version of her own song "Asu e no Kizuna".

== Track list ==
CD
No.	Title	Lyrics	Music	Length
1.	"Adesso e Fortuna: Honoo to Eien" (Adesso e Fortuna～炎と永遠; Adesso e Fortuna～Eternal Flame (CD+DVD Bonus Track))	Akino Arai	Akino Arai, Hitoshi Fujima (Elements Garden)	4:14
2.	"Asu e no Kizuna" (明日へのキズナ; Bond for Tomorrow)	Naomi Kosaka	Saya, Shintaro Tokita	4:59
3.	"1000 no Omoi" (1000の想い; Thoughts of 1000)	Toshikazu Kadono	Toshikazu Kadono	4:11
4.	"Crossroad" (クロスロード)	Naho	Ryosuke Shigenaga, Makoto Miyazaki	5:01
5.	"Higurashi" (蜩-HIGURASHI-; Product-Higurachi)	Naho	Big Boom	4:40
6.	"Hatenaki Michi" (果てなき道; Endless Road)	Yuki Okamura	Yuki Okamura, Satori Shiraishi, Tatsuhiko Murayama	4:55
7.	"Hikari" (ヒカリ; Light)	minato	Minato, Faith-T	3:37
8.	"My Door"	Minato	Minato, Masanori Takumi	4:12
9.	"Genkai Dreamers" (限界DREAMERS; Limit-Dreamers)	Saori Codama	Yukari Kato, Makoto Miyazaki	4:14
10.	"Secret Eden"	Daisuke Kikuta (Elements Garden)	Daisuke Kikuta (Elements Garden), Saori Codama	5:20
11.	"La La La (Sekai o Hitotsu ni)" (La La La ～世界をひとつに～; La La La: One of the World)	Izumi Arisato	Himeka, Daisuke Kikuta (Elements Garden)	5:09
12.	"Mirai e... -Album version-" (未来へ。。。; To the Future...)	Saya	Saya, Ace	6:37
13.	"Asu e no Kizuna -Ballad version-" (CD+DVD Bonus Track)	Naomi Kosaka	Saya, Andrew Lim, Ruka Kawada	5:13
Total length:				62:39

DVD
No.	Title	Length
1.	"Asu e no Kizuna (Music Video)"
2.	"Hatenaki Michi (Music Video)"
3.	"Mirai e...(Music Video)"

== Charts ==
Chart	Peak position	Reported sales
Oricon Albums Weekly Chart	115	1,000
