= Chōjin Neiger =

Chōjin Neiger (超神ネイガー, Chōjin Neigā, "Super-God Neiger") is a local hero from Nikaho, Akita Prefecture, a fictional superhero who represents the region and is depicted as a tokusatsu hero. Developed by a local sports gym's manager and former UWF professional wrestler Tamotsu Ebina (海老名 保, Ebina Tamotsu), Chōjin Neiger debuted in June 2005 and has gained a following throughout all of Japan. Chōjin Neiger has also spawned radio dramas, comic books, and television specials, and a series of original songs which include the vocal talents of Ichirou Mizuki and Mitsuko Horie.

== The Chōjins ==
Each of the characters developed by the Neiger Project is said to protect a different aspect of Akita Prefecture. They transform with the power of the Gōshaku Jewel (豪石玉, Gōshaku Tama, "gōshaku" is an Akita dialect word for "to get angry" or "to scold").

Neiger (ネイガー, Neigā)
Transforming from Ken Akita (アキタ・ケン, Akita Ken), Neiger protects the land and agriculture of Akita, designed after the namahage of the region's folklore. His weapons include Kiritan Swords (キリタン・ソード, Kiritan Sōdo), the Buriko Gun (ブリコガン, Buriko Gan), the Kamakura Knuckle (カマクラ・ナックル, Kamakura Nakkuru), and the Kanto Shield (カントウ・シールド, Kantō Shīrudo). He rides the Machine Shotslar (マシン・ショッツラー, Mashin Shottsurā, "Shottsuru" is a fish sauce for the Akita sailfin sandfish), which transforms from a combine harvester. Neiger can also assume a power-up form, Daihōsaku Form (大豊作フォーム, Daihōsaku Fōmu, roughly translated as "bumper crop form"). His catchphrase is "Protecting the sea, the mountains, and Akita, Chōjin Neiger!!" (海を、山を、秋田を守る、超神ネイガー!!, Umi o, yama o, Akita o mamoru, Chōjin Neigā!!).
Neiger Geon (ネイガー・ジオン, Neigā Jion)
Transforming from Shiro Fujisato (フジサト・シロー, Fujisato Shirō), Neiger Geon protects the forestry of Akita. Also designed after a namahage, Neiger Geon fights with Zui Quan attacks and his weapons are the Kiritonfa (キリトンファー, Kiritonfā) and Kiritanchaku (キリタンチャク). He also gets a powered up form called Daiginjō Form (大吟醸フォーム, Daiginjō Fōmu, "daiginjō" is a term used to refer to sake which is made from rice polished to 50% or lower).
Aragemaru (アラゲ丸)
Transforming from Ryu Hachimori (ハチモリ・リュウ, Hachimori Ryū), Aragemaru protects the fisheries of Akita. He has tetrapod designs in his armor and is armed with the Tara Bazooka (タラ・バズーカ, Tara Bazūka) and Ika Slicer (イカ・スライサー, Ika Suraisā).
Neiger Mai (ネイガー・マイ, Neigā Mai)
Transforming from Mai Akita (アキタ・マイ, Akita Mai), Neiger Mai protects the industry of Akita.
Kantō Man (カントウマン)
Transforming from, Joe Kubota (クボタ・ジョー, Kubota Jō), Kantō Man is not one of the Chōjins but is a Chōchin Neiger (提灯ネイガー, Chōchin Neigā).
Neiger BBG (ネイガービガビガG, Neigā Bigabiga Jī)
Transforming from Kenta Akita (アキタ・ケンタ, Akita Kenta), Neiger BBG is a legendary Neiger from 100 years in the future. His name comes from the Akita dialect word bigabigajii (ビガビガジイ), meaning "shiny", referencing the Maziora coloration of his costume.
Zapper Zeal (ザッパー・ジール, Zapā Jīru)
Zapper Zeal is Neiger's apprentice who is armed with a leek sword. He is named after the Akita Prefecture dish zappa jiru (ザッパ汁).

== CD releases ==
Neiger Theme Song
"Gōshaku! Chōjin Neiger ~Midaga Omedaji~" (豪石！超神ネイガー ～見だが おめだぢ～, Gōshaku! Chōjin Neigā ~Midaga Omedaji~, "Anger! Chōjin Neiger ~Did You Look?~") c/w "Tōi Kaze no Naka de" (遠い風の中で, "Away With the Wind") by Ichirou Mizuki
Ōga Neiger Theme Song
"Chōjin Neiger ~Seigi no Inaho~" (超神ネイガー ～正義ノ稲穂～, Chōjin Neigā ~Seigi no Inaho~, "Chōjin Neiger ~Rice of Justice~") c/w "Yume Kariudo" (夢刈人, "Dream Reapers") by Ichirou Mizuki
Udakko Zenshū (歌っこ全集, "Song Collection")

1. "Neiger Ondo" (ネイガー音頭, Neigā Ondo) by Abe 10zen
2. "Mamorigami ~ GEON, Mori no Ibuki o" (守森神～GEON モリノイブキヲ, Mamorigami~Jion Mori no Ibuki o, "Forest Protector God GEON, Breath of the Forest") by Shiro Fujisato
3. "Neiger Mai no Theme ~Hisui no Tsubasa" (ネイガー・マイのテーマ ～翡翠の翼～, Neigā Mai no Tēma ~Hisui no Tsubasa~, "Theme of Neiger Mai ~Wings of Jade~") by Mitsuko Horie
4. "Ore wa Minato no Abare Uma" (俺は漁港の暴れ馬, "I am the Raging Horse of the Fishing Port") by Ryu Hachimori
5. "Dajaku Kumiaika" (だじゃく組合歌, "Dajaku Union Song") by Kakusai Han
6. "Neiger Ondo (Para Para Version)" (ネイガー音頭（パラパラバージョン）, Neigā Ondo (Parapara Bājon) by Abe 10zen

== See also ==
- Local hero (Japan)
- Ryūjin Mabuyer
