= Mirai e... =

Single by Himeka

from the album Himekanvas
- B-side: "Winding Road"
- Released: May 26, 2010
- Recorded: 2010
- Genre: J-pop
- Label: Sony Music Japan International
- Composer(s): Saya, Ace
- Lyricist(s): Saya

Himeka singles chronology
"Hatenaki Michi" (2009)	"Mirai e..." (2010)	"Where I Belong" (2012)

Alternative cover
- Limited Edition

"Mirai e..." (未来へ・・・, To the Future...) is the third Japanese single by French-Canadian singer Himeka. The single was released on May 26, 2010 under her label Sony Music Japan International. "Mirai e..." is the ending theme song for the anime Senkō no Night Raid. The single has a limited edition that contains the Anime Edit version of the leading song "Mirai e...".

== Track list ==
No.	Title	Length
1.	"Mirai e... (未来へ・・・, To the Future...)"
2.	"Winding Road"
3.	"Mirai e... (Instrumental) (未来へ・・・〜Instrumental〜)"
4.	"Winding Road (Instrumental)"
5.	"Mirai e... (Anime Edit) (未来へ・・・〜Anime Edit〜)"

== Charts ==
Chart	Peak position	Sales total	Chart run
Oricon Daily Chart	48		1 week
Oricon Weekly Chart	78	1,177	1 week
Oricon Monthly Chart			1 week
Oricon Yearly Chart			1 week
