= Fire Bomber =

Fictional rock band

- Fire Bomber as seen in Macross 7

Background information
- Genres: Hard rock; pop rock; heavy metal
- Years active: 1994-present (irregularly)
- Members: Basara Nekki; Mylene Flare Jenius; Ray Lovelock; Veffidas Feaze
- Past members: unknown female singer

Fire Bomber is a fictional rock band from the anime series Macross 7 (and related projects such as Macross 7 Trash, Macross 7 Encore, and Macross Dynamite 7). Many of the songs attributed to Fire Bomber were in fact done by the real band Humming Bird. In real life, Fire Bomber's music was performed by Yoshiki Fukuyama (the singing voice and guitar of Basara), Chie Kajiura (the singing voice of Mylene), and occasionally by Tomo Sakurai (the acting spokesperson of Mylene).

The four band members are among the main characters of Macross 7, whose narrative significantly focuses on their adventures (particularly on those of the two lead vocalists Basara Nekki and Mylene Flare Jenius). The band members sing on stage as well as in space, where they occasionally engage in combat in their mecha. In the fictional world of Macross, Fire Bomber was pivotal in defeating the alien Protodeviln after discovering that their music was the only thing capable of affecting them.

Three of their songs were also featured in the 2008 series Macross Frontier, as S.M.S. Skull Leader Ozma Lee is a fan of the band. In the second Macross Frontier movie, Ranka Lee and other SMS members acted as the cover band of Fire Bomber (titled "Lovely Bomber") as part of a diversion to free Sheryl Nome from prison.

== Fictional line-up ==
- Basara Nekki – Lead vocals, guitar
- Mylene Flare Jenius – Bass, co-lead vocals
- Ray Lovelock – Keytar
- Veffidas Feaze – Drums

== Real line-up ==
- Vocals – Yoshiki Fukuyama and Nobutoshi Hayashi (Basara Nekki)
- Vocals – Chie Kajiura and Tomo Sakurai (Mylene Jenius)
- Bass – Yukio Sugi
- Drums – Kazuo Sitay
- Guitars – Yoshiki Fukuyama
- Guitars – Haruhiko Mera
- Guitars – Masaki Suzuki
- Keyboards – Seiji Tanaka

== Discography ==
=== Albums ===
- Let's Fire!!. The first Macross 7/Fire Bomber album was released. It contains the tracks played in the first half of the TV series in more or less the order in which they appear in the episodes.
- Second Fire!. The second Fire Bomber CD. Contains the songs played in the second half of the series, including the two "Let's Bomber!" video songs.
- Dynamite Fire!! The Dynamite OVA song album. Songs are in more or less the order in which they appear in the series, though there are several that are no sung in the OVA.
- Radio Fire!!. This CD contains the complete radio program from all the radio broadcasts from Elma's radio and the Zola public radio in the Dynamite OVA. Most of the tracks on this CD are drama tracks. There are also different versions of Fire Bomber songs and songs by other artists.
- Live Fire!! (1995). A recording CD of Fire Bomber live in concert. The tracks are mostly sung by the voice actor of Basara (Hayashi Nobutoushi) and Mylene (Sakurai Tomo), not their singing voices from the anime.
- Kara-OK Fire!!. Karaoke album of most of the songs that appear in the TV series. Contains duet and guitar karaoke bonus tracks at the end for Planet Dance.
- Acoustic Fire!! The songs on this acoustic album are not quite the acoustic versions found in the anime itself. There's more instrumentation, though little enough to be called "acoustic". The album also has a more "country American" feel to it, since it was recorded in the US.
- Ultra Fire!! "Best of" Fire Bomber album.
- Galaxy Network Chart 1. A "real" Macross universe album containing tracks from what is probably a single week of the Galaxy Network Chart's top 10 ratings of bands from all over the galaxy. Note that Fire Bomber has five of the ten spots.
- Galaxy Network Chart 2 As above.
- Mylene Jenius Sings Lynn Minmay (1995) Two female vocalists of Macross join forces in this album. Mylene sings Minmay's most famous songs including Ai Oboeteimasu ka? (Do You Remember Love?), the version of which appears in Fleet of the Strongest Women. The singer is not Chie Kajiura, Mylene's series singing voice, but is instead her voice actress Sakurai Tomo.
- English Fire. All the songs on this album have been redone in English by the band Fire Bomber AmeriCan. Instead of simply being English versions of Fire Bomber songs, the makers of Macross have created an English version of the band Fire Bomber. In the Macross universe, Fire Bomber AmeriCan is a band on the English-speaking fleet Macross 11 that claims that the Macross 7 Fire Bomber is a rip-off of it. The singers for this band are also different. According to the fictional Macross continuity Lynn Kaifun, a character from the first TV series from 1982 (who was Lynn Minmay's cousin and also her former manager) is the creator and manager of Fire Bomber AmeriCan.
- Best Collection (not an official release)
- Other Fire!! (not an official release)
- Memorial CD (not an official release)
- "Seventh Moon" single
- "My Friends" single
- "Heart and Soul" single
- "Dynamite Explosion" single
- "Fukuyama Fire". On May 24, 2005, 10 years after Macross 7 aired in Japan, Yoshiki Fukuyama (singing voice for Basara) released a tribute album (Fukuyama Fire – A Tribute to Nekki Basara) in which he sings the most popular Macross 7 songs with new arrangements plus a new song.
- Re.Fire. Fifteen years after Macross 7 first aired in Japan, Fire Bomber released its newest album, Re.Fire in Japan on October 14, 2009. This new album brings 10 newly made songs, and two new versions of the hit songs "Love It" and "Totsugeki Love Heart".

=== Songs ===
Songs	Composer	Lyrics	Debut	Vocals	Albums
Seventh Moon	Atsutaka Kawachi	K. Inojo	Episode 1 (opening theme)	Yoshiki Fukuyama	
Planet Dance	Sudou Hideki	K. Inojo	Episode 1	Yoshiki Fukuyama and Chie Kajiura (Duet Version)	
My Friends	Miki Kawano	M. Meg	Episode 1 (Ending Theme)	Chie Kajiura	
Totsugeki Love Heart	Kawauchi Atsutaka	K. Inojo	Episode 1	Yoshiki Fukuyama	
My Soul For You	Yoshiki Fukuyama	K. Inojo	Episode 2 (acoustic), full version: Episode 3	Yoshiki Fukuyama	
Sweet Fantasy	Ootsuki	M. Meg	Episode 10	Chie Kajiura	
Remember Sixteen	Kawauchi Atsutaka	K. Inojo	Episode 17	Yoshiki Fukuyama and Chie Kajiura	
Holy Lonely Light	Sudou Hideki	K. Inojo	Episode 21	Yoshiki Fukuyama and Chie Kajiura (Duet Version)	
Submarine Street	Shun'ya Fukuda	K. Inojo	Episode 29	Yoshiki Fukuyama	
Power to the Dream	Yoshiki Fukuyama	K. Inojo	Episode 32	Yoshiki Fukuyama	
Try Again	Yoshiki Fukuyama	K. Inojo	Episode 40	Yoshiki Fukuyama	
Light The Light	K. Inojo	TSUKASA	Episode 41	Yoshiki Fukuyama and Chie Kajiura (Single/Duet Version)	
Angel Voice	Yoko Kanno	K. Inojo	Macross Dynamite 7	Yoshiki Fukuyama	
Feel Universe			Macross Dynamite 7	Yoshiki Fukuyama	
Dynamite Explosion			Macross Dynamite 7 (Opening Theme)	Yoshiki Fukuyama	
New Frontier			Macross Dynamite 7	Yoshiki Fukuyama	
Parade			Macross Dynamite 7 (Ending Theme)	Yoshiki Fukuyama	
Burning Fire		indy	Macross Ultimate Frontier (Opening Theme)	Yoshiki Fukuyama	
