= Ryujin Mabuyer the Movie: Nanatsu no Mabui =

Ryujin Mabuyer The Movie Nanatsu no Mabui
- Directed by: Tomoki Sano
- Screenplay by: Chosenori Fukuhara
- Starring: Shintaro Yamada
- Cinematography: Takehiro Kuramochi
- Music by: Masaaki Uechi
- Production company: Chronicle
- Distributed by: Asmik Ace
- Release date: January 7, 2012
- Running time: 96 minutes
- Country: Japan
- Language: Japanese
- Box office: ¥60 million

Ryujin Mabuyer the Movie: Nanatsu no Mabui (琉神マブヤー THE MOVIE 七つのマブイ, Ryūjin Mabuyā Zā Mūbī Nanatsu no Mabui; lit. "The Seven Souls") is a 2012 Japanese tokusatsu film directed by Tomoki Sano.

== Cast ==
- Shintaro Yamada as Uruma/Ryujin Mabuyer
- Issa as Saion/Ryujin Ganasea
- Sachiko Fukumoto as Airi
- Yukihito Nagahama as Kijimun
- Hiroki Kawata as Teacher Tamaki
- Taeko Yoshida as Obâ
- YASU as Aman
- TAKANO as Kuman
- Yuria Shiina as Magoochu
- Tamotsu Ebina as Neiger/Ken Akita
- Ken Maeda (voice cast) as Jinbêdar
- Gori as Habu-devil

== See also ==
- Ryujin Mabuyer
- Chōjin Neiger
