= Voicelugger =

Television series

- Genre: Tokusatsu
- Created by: Shotaro Ishinomori
- Written by: Hideki Sonoda (eps 1-3); Shinichi Inotsume (eps 4-12)
- Directed by: Tohru Hirayama; Noboru Takemoto
- Starring: Akiko Nakagawa; Haruna Ikezawa; Tomokazu Seki; Takeshi Kusao; Ichirou Mizuki
- Composer: Shunsuke Kikuchi
- Country of origin: Japan
- Original language: Japanese
- No. of episodes: 12

Production
- Running time: approx. 25 minutes
- Production companies: Salt Production; Ishimori Productions

Original release
- Network: TV Tokyo
- Release: January 12 – March 30, 1999

Voicelugger (ボイスラッガー, Boisuraggā) is a Japanese tokusatsu that aired from January 12 to March 30, 1999. It was the last production by Shotaro Ishinomori, released posthumously, who intended for the series to be serious, while it was originally written to be a parody of older tokusatsu programs. The acting cast consisted of Japanese voice actors and popular singers of music in Japanese animation.

== Story ==
The evil Emperor Genbah of the Muon Empire (ムーオン帝国の帝王ゲンバー, Mūon Teikoku no Teiō Genbā) of the planet Tsedua (ツェドゥア, Tsedua) seeks to use the Voistones (ボイストーン, Boisutōn) of four children to control Demon Beast Hades (悪魔獣ハーデス, Akumajū Hādes), but his plans are foiled by Voicelugger Gold who takes the children to Earth. Years later, the now grown up children use the power of the Voistones to fight the Muon Empire and protect the Earth.

== Characters ==
=== The Voiceluggers ===
Voicelugger Ruby/Akiko Homura (ボイスラッガールビー/帆村 明子, Boisuraggā Rubī/Homura Akiko)
A fan of tokusatsu series of the 1970s, particularly Kamen Rider. She is the first to remember the events on Tsedua.

Voicelugger Rose/Haruka Yuuki (ボイスラッガーローズ/夕樹 遙, Boisuraggā Rōzu/Yūki Haruka)
She had been living in Los Angeles. She does not remember much about Tsedua, but her memory is slowly returning.

Voicelugger Emerald/Tomokazu Daichi (ボイスラッガーエメラルド/大地 友一, Boisuraggā Emerarudo/Daichi Tomokazu)
A popular voice actor. He has memories of Tsedua and had been training his voice since his youth so it could be used as a weapon. He trains the other Voiceluggers to do the same.

Voicelugger Sapphire/Takeshi Tenma (ボイスラッガーサファイア/天馬 武, Boisuraggā Safaia/Tenma Takeshi)
A self-proclaimed "idol voice actor" who becomes the most powerful of the four children. He is adept at playing musical instruments.
Voicelugger Gold (ボイスラッガーゴールド, Boisuraggā Gōrudo)
The savior of the other four Voiceluggers who can transform his voice to suit his needs.

==== Allies ====
Android Pi (アンドロイド・π, Andoroido Pai)
An assassin sent by Genbah that Akiko turns into a friend with her voice.

Mu (μ, Myū)
An android that also befriends the Voiceluggers.
Chaos (カオス, Kaosu)
The former Voicelugger Gold.

=== Muon Empire ===
Emperor Genbah (帝王ゲンバー, Teiō Genbā)
The ruler of the Muon Empire who seeks to use the Voiceluggers to resurrect Hades.
General Gamma (将軍γ, Shōgun Ganma)
Once head of the Muon Empire forces.
Eyelash Line (アイラシュライン, Airashurain)
Female leader of the Muon Empire's forces.

== Episodes ==
1. I am a Hero (あたしがヒーロー, Atashi ga Hīrō) (Original Airdate: January 12, 1999)
2. Rose-Colored Eyes Awaken (薔薇よ目を覚ませ, Bara yo Me o Samase) (Original Airdate: January 19, 1999)
3. The Fate of One (運命がひとつになるとき, Unmei ga Hitotsu ni Naru Toki) (Original Airdate: January 26, 1999)
4. Android Pi's Lullaby (アンドロイド・パイの子守歌, Andoroido Pai no Komorika) (Original Airdate: February 2, 1999)
5. Charming Yet Malicious: Her Name is Eyelash Line (艶やかな悪意・その名はアイラシュライン, Tsuya ya Kana Akui: Sono Na wa Airashurain) (Original Airdate: February 9, 1999)
6. Lovely Zaglaus (愛ゆえに・ザガラウス, Ai Yue ni: Zagarausu) (Original Airdate: February 16, 1999)
7. Dangerous Superhero! Roar Great Search Line (危うしスーパーヒーロー!吠える大捜査線, Ayaushi Sūpāhīrō! Hoeru Daisōsasen) (Original Airdate: February 23, 1999)
8. Change of Heart (変心, Henshin) (Original Airdate: March 2, 1999)
9. Diaspora (四散, Shisan) (Original Airdate: March 9, 1999)
10. Shouting and Whispering (叫びとささやき, Sakebi to Sasayaki) (Original Airdate: March 16, 1999)
11. The Redemption Song is Not Singing (Redemption Songは歌えない, Redemption Song wa Utaenai) (Original Airdate: March 23, 1999)
12. Smiling Face in Rain, Clear Weather in a Smiling Face (雨のち笑顔 笑顔のち晴れ, Ame nochi Egao Egao nochi Hare) (Original Airdate: March 30, 1999)

== Cast ==
- Voicelugger Ruby/Akiko Homura - Akiko Nakagawa (中川 亜紀子, Nakagawa Akiko)
- Voicelugger Rose/Haruka Yuuki - Haruna Ikezawa (池澤 春菜, Ikezawa Haruna)
- Voicelugger Emerald/Tomokaze Daichi - Tomokazu Seki (関 智一, Seki Tomokazu)
- Voicelugger Sapphire/Takeshi Tenma - Takeshi Kusao (草尾 毅, Kusao Takeshi)
- Voicelugger Gold - Ichirou Mizuki (水木 一郎, Mizuki Ichirō)
- General Gamma - Akira Kamiya (神谷 明, Kamiya Akira)
- Eyelash Line - Michie Tomizawa (富沢 美智恵, Tomizawa Michie)
- Chaos - Shin-ichiro Miki (三木 眞一郎, Miki Shin'ichirō)
- Mu (Voice) - Satomi Kōrogi (こおろぎ さとみ, Kōrogi Satomi)
- Android Pi (Voice) - Masami Suzuki (鈴木 真仁, Suzuki Masami)
- Emperor Genbah (Voice) - Shōzō Iizuka (飯塚 昭三, Iizuka Shōzō)

== Guest cast ==
- Captain Squad - Hiroshi Watari
- Squad Member - Keiya Asakura
- Squad Member - Keiichi Wada
- Squad Member - Ei Hamura
- Squad Member - Hiroshi Tsuchida
- Squad Member - Shu Kawai
- Squad Member - Daisuke Tsuchiya

== Stunt Crew ==
- Voicelugger Ruby - Tomohiko Akiyama (秋山 智彦, Akiyama Tomohiko; credited as 秋山 智緋子 in the last episode)
- Voicelugger Rose - Yumiko Murata (村田 裕美子, Murata Yumiko)
- Voicelugger Emerald - Kiyoshi Hayashi (林 潔, Hayashi Kiyoshi)
- Voicelugger Sapphire - Toru Kadowaki (門脇 亨, Kadowaki Toru)
- Voicelugger Gold - Toshiyuki Kikuchi (菊地 寿幸, Kikuchi Toshiyuki)

== Songs ==
Opening theme
"Hoero! Voicelugger" (ほえろ!ボイスラッガー, Hoero! Boisuraggā; "Roar! Voicelugger") by Ichirou Mizuki
Released on a single with "Voicelugger Action" (ボイスラッガー・アクション, Boisuraggā Akushon)
Ending theme
"Ame nochi Egao, Egao nochi Hare" (アメノチエガオエガオノチハレ; "Smiling Face in Rain, Clear Weather in a Smiling Face") by Hironobu Kageyama with Apple Pie
Released on a single with "Change! Voicelugger" (チェンジ!ボイスラッガー, Chenji! Boisuraggā)
