= Where I Belong (Himeka song) =

Single by Himeka
- A-side: "Where I Belong"
- B-side: "Echoes", "Kami to Akuma to Tenshi to Watashi"
- Released: October 24, 2012
- Recorded: 2012
- Genre: J-pop
- Label: Sony Music Japan International

Himeka singles chronology
"Mirai e..." (2010)	"Where I Belong" (2012)

"Where I Belong" is the fourth Japanese single by French-Canadian singer Himeka and the first single released under her new label Mages. The single was scheduled to be released on October 24, 2012. "Where I Belong" is the ending theme song for the TV program Audrey no Kami Appli Shin-seiki Up Date (オードリーの神アプリ＠新世紀―ＵＰ ＤＡＴＥ―).

== Track list ==
No.	Title	Length
1.	"Where I Belong"
2.	"Echoes"
3.	"Kami to Akuma to Tenshi to Watashi (God, Devil, Angel and Me)"
4.	"Where I Belong: Off Vocal"
5.	"Echoes: Off vocal"
6.	"Kami to Akuma to Tenshi to Watashi: Off vocal"
