= Akiko Nakagawa =

Japanese voice actress

Akiko Nakagawa (中川 亜紀子, Nakagawa Akiko) is a Japanese voice actress who was born in Sapporo. She is married to Inuyasha music composer Kaoru Wada. She is one of the voice actresses for Miyuki Nanase in Kindaichi Case Files series.

== Notable voice roles ==
- Anne in Little Snow Fairy Sugar
- Moe Yanagida in Tokyo Mew Mew
- Sōta Higurashi in Inuyasha
- Inori Yamabuki/Cure Pine in Fresh Pretty Cure!
- Miyuki Nanase in Kindaichi Case Files
- Miss Goldenweek in One Piece
- Demi in Flame of Recca
- Kanna Togakushi in Happy Lesson
- Sayla and Nana in Superior Defender Gundam Force
- Massa in Gokujō!! Mecha Mote Iinchō
- Chiaki Yabe in Futari wa Pretty Cure
- Kayo Ando in Futari wa Pretty Cure Splash Star
- Shiori Kubou in Maria-sama ga Miteru
- Sivil in Macross 7
- Susie in PaRappa the Rapper
- Bomper in Engine Sentai Go-onger
- Akiko Homura in Voicelugger
- Kero Midorikawa in Mega Man NT Warrior
- Cammy in Fortune Dogs
