= Love Anison: Utattemita =

Love Anisong: Utattemita ラブ・アニソン ～歌ってみた～

Studio album by Himeka
- Released: March 3, 2010
- Recorded: 2009–2010
- Genre: Anison
- Label: Sony Music Japan International

Himeka chronology
Love Anisong: Utattemita ラブ・アニソン ～歌ってみた～ (2010)	Himekanvas (2011)

Love Anison: Utattemita (ラブ アニソン ～歌ってみた～, Rabu Anison ~Utattemita~; "Love Anime Songs: I Tried Singing") is the first Japanese cover album by French-Canadian singer Himeka. The album was released on March 3, 2010, under her label Sony Music Japan International. The Limited edition contains a second CD with all the instrumental versions of the cover songs. All the songs are opening or endings from popular anime series. The cover album charted at the #137 spot on the weekly Oricon chart and sold 1,008 copies so far.

== Track listing ==
Disc 1
No.	Title	Length
1.	"Yuzurenai Negai" (ゆずれない願い "Unyielding Wish" from Magic Knight Rayearth)
2.	"Hitomi no Naka no Meikyū" (from Yami to Bōshi to Hon no Tabibito)
3.	"Blaze" (BLAZE from Tsubasa: Reservoir Chronicle)
4.	"Soul's Refrain" (魂のルフラン Tamashii no Rufuran, from Evangelion: Death and Rebirth)
5.	"Voices" (from Macross Plus)
6.	"Sore ga, Ai Deshō?" (それが、愛でしょう? "Isn't That Love?" Full Metal Panic? Fumoffu)
7.	"Dreams" (DREAMS from After War Gundam X)
8.	"Last Regrets" (from Kanon)

Disc 2 (Limited Edition only)
No.	Title	Length
1.	"Yuzurenai Negai (Instrumental)"
2.	"Hitomi no Naka no Meikyū (Instrumental)"
3.	"Blaze (Instrumental)"
4.	"Tamashii no Refrain (Instrumental)"
5.	"Voices (Instrumental)"
6.	"Sore ga, Ai Deshō? (Instrumental)"
7.	"Dreams (Instrumental)"
8.	"Last Regrets (Instrumental)"
