= Hatenaki Michi =

Single by Himeka

from the album Himekanvas
- Released: November 25, 2009
- Genre: J-pop
- Label: Sony Music Japan International
- Songwriter(s): Yuki Okamura, Satori Shiraishi, Tatsuhiko Murayama

Himeka singles chronology
"Asu e no Kizuna" (2009)	"Hatenaki Michi" (2009)	"Mirai e..." (2010)

Alternative cover
- Limited edition cover

"Hatenaki Michi" (果てなき道) is the second Japanese single by French-Canadian singer Himeka. The single was released on November 25, 2009, on the Sony Music Japan International label. "Hatenaki Michi" is the ending theme song for the anime Tegami Bachi. The single has a limited edition that contains the Anime Edit version of the leading song "Hatenaki Michi".

== Track list ==
No.	Title	Length
1.	"Hatenaki Michi (果てなき道, Endless Road)"
2.	"Sora wa Oshietekureru (空は教えてくれる, The Sky Will Let Me Know)"
3.	"Hatenaki Michi (Instrumental) (果てなき道〜Instrumental〜)"
4.	"Sora wa Oshietekureru (Instrumental) (空は教えてくれる 〜Instrumental〜)"
5.	"Hatenaki Michi (Anime Edit) (果てなき道〜Anime Edit〜)^{1}"

- ^{1} Limited Edition bonus track.

== Charts ==
Chart	Peak position	Sales total	Chart run
Oricon Daily Chart	29		6 weeks
Oricon Weekly Chart	33	6,155	6 weeks
