= Asu e no Kizuna =

"Asu e no Kizuna 明日へのキズナ"

Single by Himeka

from the album Himekanvas
- Released: May 27, 2009
- Genre: J-pop
- Length: 13:43
- Label: Sony Music Japan International
- Songwriters: Naomi Kosaka, Saya, Shintaro Tokita

Himeka singles chronology
"Asu e no Kizuna 明日へのキズナ" (2009)	""Hatenaki Michi"" (2009)

"Asu e no Kizuna" (明日へのキズナ) is the debut Japanese single by French Canadian Himeka. The single was released on May 27, 2009, under her label Sony Music Japan International. "Asu e no Kizuna" is the opening theme song for the anime adaptation of PlayStation 3 game Valkyria Chronicles. The B-side, "Sayonara Solitaire" is a cover of the ending theme song of Chrono Crusade sung by Saeko Chiba.

== Track list ==
No.	Title	Length
1.	"Asu e no Kizuna (明日へのキズナ, Bonds of Tomorrow)"	5:03
2.	"Sayonara Solitaire (さよならソリティア, Sayonara Solitia; Farewell Solitaire)"	3:37
3.	"Asu e no Kizuna (Instrumental) (明日へのキズナ〜Instrumental〜)"	5:01

== Charts ==
Chart	Peak position	Sales total	Chart run
Oricon Daily Chart	#17		6 weeks
Oricon Weekly Chart	#28	10,254	6 weeks
Oricon Monthly Chart			6 weeks
Oricon Yearly Chart			6 weeks
