= Shintaro Yamada =

Retired Japanese actor, model, and singer (born 1986)

- 山田 親太朗
- Born: July 10, 1986 (age 40); Onna, Okinawa, Japan
- Occupations: Actor; model; singer; (all formerly)
- Years active: 2006–2020
- Agent: Our Songs Creative Inc.
- Height: 1.78 m (5 ft 10 in)
- Spouse: Koume Watanabe (m. 2023)
- Relatives: Yu Yamada (sister); Shun Oguri (brother-in-law)
- Website: www.oursongs-creative.jp/profile/yamada_shin/

Shintaro Yamada (山田 親太朗, Yamada Shintarō; born July 10, 1986) is a former Japanese fashion model, actor, and singer. His modeling credits include appearing in Men's Non-No and Popeye. He is the leader of the Quiz! Hexagon II singing group Sata Andagi. On July 4, 2021, he announced his retirement from the entertainment industry in 2020.

== Personal life ==
Yamada was born on July 10, 1986, in Onna, Okinawa. His older sister is the fashion model, actress, and talent Yu Yamada, and his younger brother is a voice actor, Shinnojo Yamada. Through his sister, his brother-in-law is actor Shun Oguri.

On March 17, 2023, he announced his marriage to a former member of Super Girls, Koume Watanabe, they are also revealed that they were expecting their first child. On April 29, he announced the birth of his first child, a son.

== Filmography ==
=== TV drama ===
- Yukan Club (2007), Kasumi Ura
- Saitō-san (2008), Masayoshi Yanagawa
- My Sassy Girl (2008), Moichi Gotō
- Innocent Love (2008)
- Hanazakari no Kimitachi e (2011), Kyōgo Sekime
- Sprout (2012), Seiji Okunuki
- Kamen Teacher (2013), Shūsaku Endō
- Hell Teacher Nūbē (2014), Haruo Watari

=== Film ===
- Sakigake!! Otokojuku (2008), Ryūji Toramaru
- Ryujin Mabuyer the Movie: Nanatsu no Mabui (2012), Uruma/Ryujin Mabuyer
