= Himeka =

Canadian singer no longer active in Japan

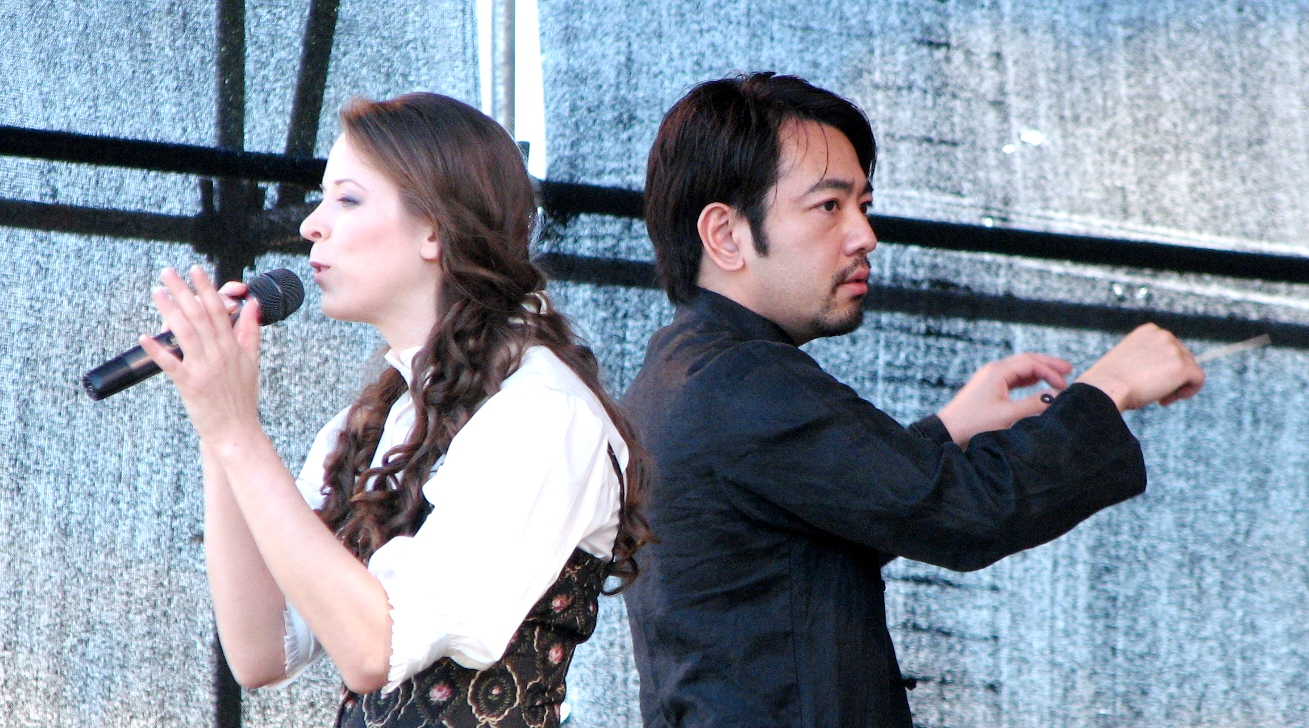
- Himeka and conductor Yukihiro Notsu in Tallinn Maritime Days, July 2011

Background information
- Born: Catherine St. Onge; July 20, 1981 (age 45); Quebec, Canada
- Origin: Tokyo, Japan
- Genres: Pop; J-pop
- Occupation: Singer
- Years active: 2009–2014
- Labels: Sony Music Japan International (2009–2012); Mages./amuleto (2012–2014)
- Website: HIMEKA (website) (archive); 1st blog - HIMEKA in JAPAN (archive); 2nd blog (archive); 3rd blog (archive); Latest blog (archive)

Catherine St. Onge (born July 20, 1981), better known by her stage name Himeka (ヒメカ) (stylized as HIMEKA), is a Canadian anime song singer no longer active in Japan. While fluent in English and her native French, she is moderately proficient in Japanese. Her stage name, Himeka, comes from a character she created in a story she wrote when she was 13 years old.

== Career ==
Born in Quebec, St-Onge was very interested in theater and music. At the age of 12, St-Onge taught herself English by singing Disney songs. Soon after at 13, she began writing her own stories in which Himeka was the main character. Her interest in Japanese culture started at the age of 15 when she saw an episode of the anime series Sailor Moon. In 2008, St-Onge moved to Japan to pursue her singing career.

She was the winner of the Second Annual Animax Anison Grand Prix, which gathers aspiring singers from all over Japan for the chance to make a professional debut and sing a theme song in an anime television show. Her debut single "Asu e no Kizuna", released on May 27, 2009, was the opening theme to the anime adaptation of the PlayStation 3 video game Valkyria Chronicles. The single debuted at number 28 on the Oricon single charts.

Her second single was titled "Hatenaki Michi", and was released on November 25, 2009. It was the featured ending song for a new anime named Tegamibachi. The singled peaked at number 33 on the weekly Oricon chart.

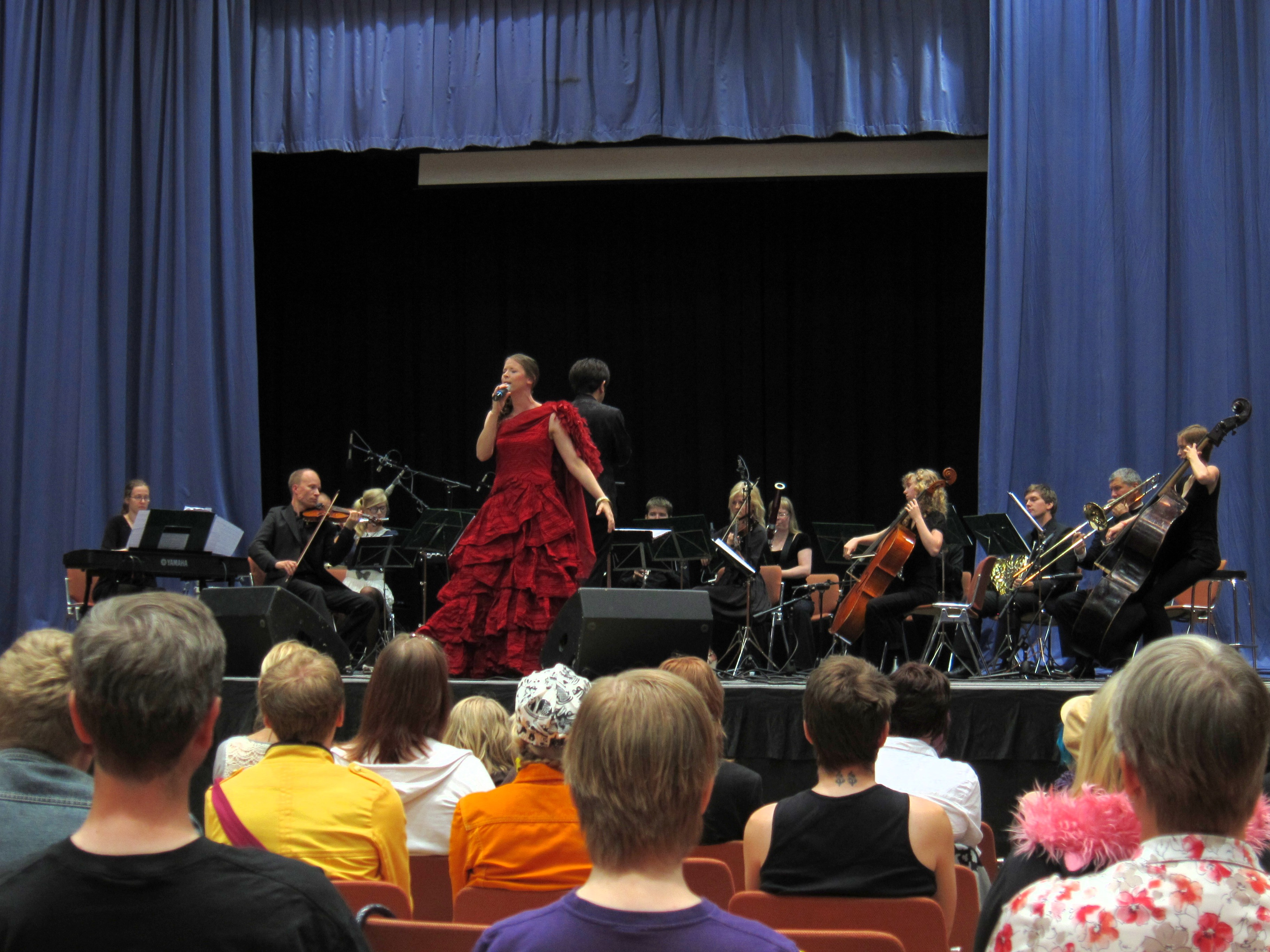
Himeka, Yukihiro Notsu and Suomen Nuoriso-Orkesteri at Finncon/Animecon 2011 in Finland

Himeka's first cover album, Anison: Utattemita, was released on March 3, 2010. Her third single, "Mirai e...", was released on May 26, 2010. It was featured as the ending theme in the anime Senkō no Night Raid. Himeka's first digital single, "La la la, Sekai o Hitotsuni", was released in July 2010. The song was an official support song for the World Cosplay Summit 2010 in Nagoya, Japan.

Himeka's first original album titled "Himekanvas" has been released on November 31, 2011, and includes all her released singles, seven original songs and two cover songs. On February 12, 2012, Himeka gave her first solo live concert in the Shibuya Boxx hall. The concert sold out.

On July 1, 2012, Himeka confirmed that, in April 2012, she had moved to a new label named Mages./amuleto. Later, it was confirmed that she would release a new single named "Where I Belong" scheduled to be released on October 24, 2012. The song would be the ending theme for a series named Audrey no Kami Appli Shin Seiki Up Date.

It was announced not long after, that she was releasing a song under the name "AG7" with 7 other Animax Anison Grand Prix winners. The song is named Endless Nova and is going to be released on July 23, 2014. It will be included on a single released by the latest Anison Grand Prix winner named Tatsuyuki Kobayashi.

On April 1, 2014, it was announced that she was no longer signed to a label. On her Twitter, she did express that she will continue to pursue a career in music. After that, in April 2015, the doujin single "STAY DIAMOND / Because of you" was released as a duo "HIME×KANA" with Kanako Kodera.

== Discography ==
=== Albums ===
- Himekanvas (2011)

=== Cover albums ===
- Love Anison: Utattemita (2010)

=== Singles ===
- "Asu e no Kizuna" (2009)
- "Hatenaki Michi" (2009)
- "Mirai e..." (2010)
- "Where I Belong" (2012)
- "Kagiriaru Yume" (2013)
- "Stay Diamond / Because Of You x KANA" (2015)

=== Digital singles ===
- 2010: "La La La (Sekai o Hitotsu ni)" (2010)
