= Ryujin Mabuyer =

- Also known as: Ryujin Mabuyer OVA: SO! Uchina
- Genre: Tokusatsu
- Written by: Yuki Yamada 山田裄
- Directed by: Tsukasa Kishimoto 岸本司
- Starring: Season 1 Cast: Satoshi Chinen 知念臣悟 Haruka Momohara 桃原遥 Tomoji Yamashiro 山城智二 Kenta Nakaza 仲座健太 Miki Uejo 上門みき Nobuyuki Hirayasu 平安信行 Kana Teruya 照屋哉 Hiroyuki Kaneshiro 金城博之 Masahiro Arakaki 新垣正弘 Blues ブルース (dog) Season 2 Cast: OVA Cast: Moe Ishihara 石原萌 Yasuyoshi Oshiro 大城康由 Satoshi Kadekaru かでかるさとし Ayano Higa 比嘉彩乃 Keiichi Yoneda 米田圭一 Riki Kaneshiro 金城りき Masayuki Tahara 田原雅之 Atsushi Nakasone 中曽根篤 Koji Urakanaka 浦上浩二 Tomokito Yoshida 吉田知人 Koji Sueyoshi 末吉浩司 Daisuke Okada 岡田大介
- Country of origin: Japan
- Original languages: Japanese; Okinawan
- No. of seasons: 3
- No. of episodes: 39

Production
- Producer: Yuichi Koyano 小谷野由一
- Production location: Naha, Okinawa

Original release
- Release: 4 October 2008 – 25 December 2010

Ryujin Mabuyer (琉神マブヤー, Ryūjin Mabuyā) is an Okinawan tokusatsu television series. It is based on the adventures of a local hero of Okinawa Prefecture of the same name. The first season aired from 4 October 2008 to 27 December 2008 and a second season aired from 2 October 2010 to 25 December 2010. A related series, Ryujin Mabuyer Gaiden So! Uchinā (琉神マブヤー外伝 SO!ウチナー) has 13 episodes that aired from 17 October 2009 to 16 January 2010. A film based on the series, Ryujin Mabuyer The Movie Nanatsu no Mabui, was released on 7 January 2012.

== Characters ==
=== Protagonists ===
Kanai / Ryujin Mabuyer is a young man who apprentices for a master clay-sculptor. In the beginning of the series, he is somewhat careless and lazy. Like most young Okinawan's he doesn't know about the soul of the islands and why they have certain traditions. One day he feels very weak and consults his 'Auntie" who tells him that he needs to recharge his soul, and helps him by chanting an incantation. This summons the spirit of Ryujin Mabuyer into Kanai's body, and allows him to transform and fight as the hero. Luckily this occurred just in time, because the Evilcorps (Majimun) had just arrived on Okinawa to steal all of the Mabui stones (soul of Okinawa stones) and cause bad things to happen. Ryujin Mabuyer's armor is based on the look of a Shisa. Mabuyer's energy attack is summoned by whistling with his fingers.

Nirai / Ryujin Ganasea is Kanai's older brother and formerly one with an Onihito-Devil: General of the Evilcorp (Majimun). Nirai was trapped within the body of Onihito-Devil for a long time. Eventually Kanai rescued him and Kanamie nursed him back to health. He rediscovered his brotherly bond, and found the power within himself to become Ryujin Ganasea. Ryujin Ganasea's armor is based on the look of a dragon. Ganasea's energy attack is summoned by charging his arms with lightning first.

Kanamie / Ohjin Kanamie is a female god-being sent to help Kanai and later Nirai in their fight against evil. In human form she has supernatural abilities, such as energy healing, telepathy, and the ability to enchant san (a long narrow leaf with a knot, used for protection against evil). In her hero form she is better at physical combat. Ohjin Kanamie's armor is based on a phoenix, and she is the only hero to use a tool to attack. Her Kanzashi turns into a wand with a san attached to it, and then into an uchiwa fan in order to attack with energy.

Kurea is Kanai's love interest and the daughter of his employer. She often keeps Kanai on his toes and reminds him about things he has to do. Kurea is very popular in her town and is involved in many community activities. In season 1 Kurea does not know Kanai is Ryujin Mabuyer, but has a crush on the hero.

Ken is a Shisa (Seeser/shi-shi dog) spirit sent to help Kanai train and succeed as Ryujin Mabuyer. When not in a living form he appears as a male Shisa statue with a red bandana. When in a living form, he appears as a German Shepherd Dog to all normal humans. To villains and Kanai, he is a man in a poorly constructed dog costume. Although he is comic relief, he is also very knowledgeable and helpful to Kanai.

Obachan "Auntie" is an old lady in the town who knows uchina guchi (Okinawan language) and all the old traditions. She owns a chain of convenience stores and always has a younger, handsome boyfriend around. She often participates in the festivals and other activities in the town. Many times Kanai and Kurea can tell if something evil is happening to Okinawa, if Auntie starts acting unusual. It is unknown if she actually is anyone's aunt.

Ganjiro is Kurea's father and a master sculptor whom Kanai is apprenticed to. He often scolds Kanai, and wants him to be more responsible like Kurea.

Forest King is a wise spirit of Okinawa, that shows Kanai/Mabuyer and Nirai/Ganasea that you can't fight when angry. He also trains them in new techniques.

(OVA) Mabuyer is the embodiment of the spirit of Okinawa that protects the islands from harm. (Kanai does not appear in SO! Uchina.) He is often acedentally summoned when Yui and Yunta exclaim "SO! Uchina!"

(OVA) Ganasea is the embodiment of another spirit of Okinawa that switches off with Mabuyer when they are summoned. (Nirai does not appear in SO! Uchina.)

(OVA) Yui is the female main character of SO! Uchina series. She is best friends with Yunta, but has a crush on Mabuyer. She often has an Okinawan related problem that can be solved by learning a traditional story from Jinpun-chan, and inevitably has to retrieve the 'soul flower' of the story when the Majimun try to steal it. She can summon the soul flower into Yunta's body (usually right before the Majimun can grab it). This transforms his clothing into the traditional dress of a character from the story/soul flower.She can summon Ryujin Mabuyer by yelling "SO! Uchina!" in unison with Yunta.

(OVA) Yunta is the male main character of SO! Uchina series. He is best friends with Yui, and is in love with her but too scared to tell her. Yui uses his body to summon stolen soul flowers, transforming him into a character from a traditional Okinawan folktale. He can summon Ryujin Mabuyer by yelling "SO! Uchina!" in unison with Yui.

(OVA) Jinpun-chan is an old man who lives in the spirit forest, in which only children or those with pure hearts can visit. Every day he tells Yui and Yunta an Okinawan folktale related to their problem of the day. After he tells the story and explains the moral and why it relates to their current situation, the story pictures disappear from the frame due to Majimun King's evil spell. He then tells Yui and Yunta to hurry and get the story/soul flower back, before the monsters get it and destroy that part of Okinawan culture and spirit.

=== Antagonists ===
Habu-Devil is the leader of Evilcorp in season 1. He is based on the Habu snake that is prevalent in Okinawa. These snakes are very aggressive and extremely venomous. Habu-Devil is driven to destroy Okinawan culture because he feels the islands belong to Habu and other monsters (as they were there first) rather than the humans who came later.

Onihito-Devil is the second in command of Evilcorp (Majimun) in season 1. He is based on the "Onihito" or Crown of Thorns Sea Star that can be found in the shallow water and coral reefs of Okinawa. These creatures are large and covered in hundreds of sharp spines that introduce a toxic venom into wounds they cause. In his human form he is Kanai's long lost older brother Nirai. In his monster form he is extremely powerful and nearly unstoppable. In season 2 he is split from Nirai and is considerably weaker without him.

Mangoochu (a play on Mongoose and 'chu' the sound of kissing) is a female villain in the Evilcorp (Majimun). She seems lazy and disinterested in what her accomplices are doing, most of the time. But when it is time for her to fight she is a formidable enemy. Her signature move is a surprise axe-kick to the head. She also sometimes plays a black Sanshin (Okinawan traditional 3 stringed banjo) to paralyze her enemies. This allows her or other villains to strike without being harmed themselves. She also seems to have an idol-esque crush on Mabuyer, even though she regularly tries to kill him. Mangoochu is based on a mongoose, which in Okinawan lore is the rival of the Habu snake, and equally as aggressive.

Habuhime-Devil is the leader of the Evilcorps (Majimun) in season 2. She is based on a Hime Habu Snake and she resembles a pink and feminine version of Habu-Devil. For the most part she is powerful and very successful in her evil plans.

Habu-Kuragen is Habuhime-Devil's number-one henchman. He acts cocky but gives up fighting easily. He's much rather suck up to Habuhime-Devil for approval, than win fights. He's based on the Habu Jellyfish (a species of Box Jellyfish) that resides in the shallow water off Okinawa from May to September. They are known for extremely painful stings that sometimes cause death. The helmet of his costume switches between one with tentacles and one with goggles, depending on if he's with friends or enemies.

Koobers 1 and 2 are the junior henchmen of the Majimun. They are based on non-specific Okinawan spiders. Unlike most Tokusastu characters of this kind, they are actually quite successful and helpful when it comes to fighting and evil plans. Although they are much better at finding the Mabui stones than they are at fighting.They primarily make a 'Koo-Koo' sound to communicate, but occasionally will use words to speak to their leaders.

(OVA) Majimun King is, as his name would imply, King of the Majimun/Evil Corps. When some teenagers lifted a sacred seal off the bolder the Majimun were trapped within, all the Majimun escaped. However the power of the spirit of Okinawa was too strong for Majimun King to escape all the way. So his lower half remained trapped in the rock. He relies on each one of the Majimun individually to be the leader in each episode, and one by one they fail, and are scolded by Majimun King. Unlike the other monsters, he does not appear to be based on a dangerous animal from Okinawa. When he chants "Hago, hago, shini hago" ("Nasty, nasty, very nasty" in Okinawan dialect.) the soul flower is extracted from the folktale and travels toward Majimun King's location. It always is intercepted by Yunta, Yui or Mabuya.

== Mabui Stones ==
Mabui stones are the 'soul' pieces of Okinawa. Each one representing a vital part of the culture. Often, they represent an aspect of the culture that young people have disregarded or forgotten. When the Evilcorps (Majimun) find a Mabui stone and place it in their black jar, it seals that aspect of the Okinawan culture, and the people forget it all together. If the Majimun can collect all 9 stones, they can create a super Typhoon that will wipe out all the humans from Okinawa. Ryujin Mabuyer must retrieve all the stones and place them in his white jar in order to restore the world to normal.

The 9 Mabui Stones

- 1.Uchina-guchi: Gives Okinawans the power to speak the Okinawan language, which comes from their hearts.
- 2.Ishiganto: Gives power to the Ishi-gan-to stones (found on everyone in Okinawa's homes) that keep evil spirits away.
- 3.Te-ge: Gives Okinawans the ability to think clearly and make up their minds.
- 4.Eisa: Gives Okinawans the power to dance Eisa, which they believe gives them the power to love and have children.
- 5.Chaganjuu: "Are you in good health?" Gives Okinawans the power to live long lives by eating healthy food and exercising.
- 6.Ichariba cho-de: Gives Okinawans a brotherly bond and helpful personalities.
- 7.Totome: Reminds Okinawans to respect and remember their ancestors.
- 8.Nuchi do takara: Gives Okinawans the ability to stay positive and happy, never depressed or aimless.
- 9.Kachashi: Gives Okinawans the ability to dance Kachashi and play the sanshin, a celebratory dance of significant cultural value.

== Seasons ==
Season	Episodes	Debut	Ending
Ryujin Mabuyer	13	4 October 2008	27 December 2008
Ryujin Mabuyer Gaiden So! Uchinaa	13	17 October 2009	16 January 2010
Ryujin Mabuyer 2	13	2 October 2010	25 December 2010
Ryujin Mabuyer 3	13	1 October 2011	24 December 2011
Ryujin Mabuyer 1972 Legend	13	6 October 2012	29 December 2012
Ryujin Mabuyer 4	13	5 October 2013	28 December 2013
Ryujin Mabuyer 5	13	4 October 2015	27 December 2015
Ryujin Mabuyer ARISE	13	7 October 2017	30 December 2017

== See also ==
- Local hero (Japan)
