= Chie Kajiura =

Japanese singer

- Occupation: Singer

Chie Kajiura (チエ・カジウラ) Chie Kajiura is a Japanese singer. She performed the singing voice of Mylene Flare Jenius in Macross 7 anime and related products. She had released multiple albums, debuting her first one in 1995.

Her daughter is Hana Sugisaki, an actress.
