= Night Raid 1931 =

Japanese anime television series

- Cover art for the DVD Complete Collection release of Night Raid 1931

閃光のナイトレイド (Senkō no Night Raid)
- Genre: Action, historical, science-fiction
- Created by: A-1 Pictures
- Anime television series
- Directed by: Atsushi Matsumoto
- Produced by: Akiko Odawara; Kazuki Adachi
- Written by: Shinsuke Onishi
- Music by: Satoshi Kadokura; Taro Hakase
- Studio: A-1 Pictures
- Licensed by: AUS: Siren Visual; NA: Sentai Filmworks (expired); UK: MVM Films
- Original network: TV Tokyo
- Original run: April 5, 2010 – June 28, 2010
- Episodes: 13
- Original video animation
- Directed by: Atsushi Matsumoto
- Produced by: Akiko Odawara; Kazuki Adachi
- Written by: Shinsuke Onishi
- Music by: Satoshi Kadokura; Taro Hakase
- Studio: A-1 Pictures
- Licensed by: AUS: Siren Visual; NA: Sentai Filmworks (expired); UK: MVM Films
- Released: June 23, 2010 – December 22, 2010
- Episodes: 3

Night Raid 1931 (閃光のナイトレイド, Senkō no Naito Reido; lit. Night Raid in Flash), is a Japanese anime television series produced by A-1 Pictures and Aniplex and directed by Atsushi Matsumoto. The 13-episode anime aired in Japan on the TV Tokyo television network starting April 5, 2010. Senkō no Night Raid is the second project of Anime no Chikara. Sentai Filmworks acquired the series and released it on Blu-ray and DVD in August 2011. Sentai Filmworks' license for the series later expired in 2018.

== Premise ==
The year is 1931. The location is Shanghai, China. The Imperial Japanese Army has been dispatched to mainland China due to the relatively recent First Sino-Japanese War, Russo-Japanese War, and World War I. In this cosmopolitan city, there is a special military spy organization called Sakurai and their deeds which are buried in history will be revealed.

== Characters ==
=== Sakurai organization ===
Aoi Miyoshi (三好 葵, Miyoshi Aoi)
Voiced by: Hiroyuki Yoshino (Japanese); Greg Ayres (English)
A lively, optimistic young man with a great sense of justice, who tends to act rashly and impulsively. To hide his identity as a spy, Aoi runs a photo studio together with Kazura. He has a telekinetic ability, which allows him to manipulate objects and people around him, and requires only that he is able to see the object he intends to affect. While it proves to be useful for situations such as dodging bullets, it appears to have a time limit on the duration of use from the moment he begins to use the ability. He is proficient in Chinese, Russian, German and English and used to study in Europe where he picked up a more liberal outlook on life. He also plays the violin, but not on the professional level. His real name is Soichiro Ono (小野 総一郎, Ono Soichiro).
Kazura Iha (伊波 葛, Iha Kazura)
Voiced by: Daisuke Namikawa (Japanese); John Gremillion (English)
A man with a great sense of pride and honor, which often brings him into conflicts with Aoi. His strict manners and conservative personality are reflective of his descent from a samurai family. Kazura's ability is teleportation; he is reluctant to use his powers unless absolutely necessary, as he believes that his power gives him an unfair advantage against his opponents. His ability has limitations: Kazura must envision the location he wants to teleport to, and is also limited to the number of teleports he can make within a short period of time. While Kazura aspires to enter the Imperial Japanese Army, in which he gains a lot of recognition, he is pulled out from the military and is forced to join Sakurai because of his ability. Kazura is fluent in Chinese, German and English and is skilled in aikijutsu. His real name is Takuma Kishida (岸田琢磨, Kishida Takuma).
Natsume Kagiya (鍵谷 棗, Kagiya Natsume)
Voiced by: Takanori Hoshino (Japanese); David Wald (English)
A stern yet quietly earnest man, Natsume was born to a family of poor farmers. In his youth, he used to work as a servant at a garden treehouse, where he learned of his psychic ability for the first time. He serves Yukina with genuine faithfulness. In public, they have a formal relationship to keep up appearances, but otherwise they treat each other as equals. He has clairvoyance, which is useful for surveillance, and excels during moonlit nights. He also acts as the group's sniper. His real name is Kichizo Tanaka (田中吉蔵, Tanaka Kichizo).
Yukina Sonogi (苑樹 雪菜, Sonogi Yukina)
Voiced by: Yoshiko Ikuta (Japanese); Brittney Karbowski (English)
A mild-mannered young woman with a solemn, introspective personality, Yukina is the sole female member of the group and comes from a noble family. Upon hearing the news regarding her brother's disappearance, she joins Sakurai Kikan in order to locate his whereabouts. She can telepathically communicate with her teammates, allowing her to act as the coordinator of the group, and seems to have psychometric abilities, which can also be used in conjunction with Natsume and Aoi's abilities. Her abilities can be sharpened by the smell of flowers, especially lilies. Her real name is Setsuko Takachiho (高千穂節子, Takachiho Setsuko).
Shin'ichirou Sakurai (桜井 信一郎, Sakurai Shin'ichirō)
Voiced by: Ryūsuke Ōbayashi (Japanese); John Kaiser (English)
A supervisor from Sakurai Kikan and a former Imperial Japanese Army lieutenant colonel. He is the one who usually gives mission briefings to the group. He is a mild-mannered gentleman and speaks in a polite tone. Aoi describes him as a sly person.

=== Antagonists ===
Isao Takachiho (高千穂 勲, Takachiho Isao)
Voiced by: Hiroaki Hirata (Japanese); Andrew Love (English)
Yukina's older brother. He was an artillery second lieutenant of the Kwantung Army but disappeared without a trace along with the platoon he was in charge of in Manchuria, forcing Yukina to search for him. It is revealed that he has been acting in accordance to his own take on Pan-Asianism and becomes the enemy of Sakurai Kikan. Like his sister, he also has telepathic abilities but much stronger than hers to the point of using it to knock his targets unconscious.
Kuse (久世, Kuse)
Voiced by: Atsushi Miyauchi (Japanese); Scotty Fults (English)
Isao's subordinate, assigned to pick up Yukina upon Isao's orders. When Yukina does not arrive at the rendezvous point, Kuse tests Sakurai Kikan by bomb threats. He also has the ability of telepathy and teleportation, but his teleportation ability is limited to a set number of fixed locations. His uniform implies that he is an infantry second lieutenant.
Ichinose (市ノ瀬, Ichinose)
Voiced by: Nobuhiko Okamoto (Japanese); Josh Grelle (English)
A physicist involved the development of nuclear weapons for Isao's organization. However, despite Isao's plans to achieve Pan-Asianism with the threat of mass destruction, Ichinose is unable to create an actual working atomic bomb, struggling over the mathematical formula required for the detonation mechanism.

=== Other ===
Feng Lan (風蘭, Fū Ran)
Voiced by: Saki Fujita (Japanese); Luci Christian (English)
A girl who works in a Chinese restaurant near the photo studio where Aoi and Kazura work. She is loud, boisterous and straight-forward. She is Chinese, but speaks Japanese fluently.
Shizune Yusa (遊佐 静音, Yusa Shizune)
Voiced by: Ayako Kawasumi (Japanese); Carli Mosier (English)
Aoi's fiancée, who he believed to have died. She also skilled in playing the violin and is the one who taught Aoi on how to play. She is known as "the Prophet" by the Japanese officials, due to her ability of foresight. As a result, she fakes her death to Aoi and abandons her former life in order to bear the responsibility of helping guide rulers in every generation. Isao's fiancée, Towa (与和), was Shizune's immediate predecessor as the "Prophet".
Ichishi (壱師, Ichishi)
Voiced by: Ling Qingcheng (Japanese); Chris Patton (English)
A rapier-thin man with a crinkly mop of hair who always wears a black coat and fedora hat. He is often seen with Shin'ichirou Sakurai, but his position is unknown. No details about him are certain at first, except that he has the supernatural ability to erase the memories of a person by touching them. With this ability, he erased the memories of a lost girl Aoi saved from a bomb attack.

== Anime ==
The opening theme is "Yakusoku" (約束; "Promise") by Mucc while the ending theme is "Mirai e..." (未来へ…; "To the Future...") by Himeka.

No.	Title	Original release date
0	"The Shipboard Shoot's Conclusion"; Transliteration: "Senjō no Kuranku Appu" (Japanese: 船上のクランクアップ)	June 23, 2010 (DVD)
This episode acts as a prologue to the main storyline. The members of Sakurai Kikan board a ship en route from the Port of Kobe to Shanghai. Their first mission is to investigate a series of mysterious disappearances of women who left for Shanghai by way of Kobe and Nagasaki. The one thing they all had in common is that they were scouted as new actresses by a movie company, whose president Senzou Kakinuma is suspected to have underground ties with the Green Gang. Accompanying him is his Chinese assistant and mistress Qinglin Cui, whom together turn out to be running a human trafficking ring using the movie company as a front. Shin'ichirou Sakurai had each of his members acting independently without any knowledge that the others are also working on the same mission. It was his way to test how they would handle things despite the presence of other undercover agents. The mission becomes successful and the culprits are apprehended.
1	"The Rescue"; Transliteration: "Kyūshutsukō" (Japanese: 救出行)	April 5, 2010
The group is tasked on a covert mission to rescue Japanese conglomerate president Youzou Kaburagi from the hands of a small Chinese military faction led by Zongwu Liu. Even though the four spies had a run in with three decoys the previous night, Yukina Sonogi deduces that Kaburagi is held captive at a fort near a riverbank east of Nanjing. Sakurai informs them that Zongwu kidnapped Kaburagi to use as a collateral for obtaining weapons and ransom money to attack the Kuomintang. While Yukina stays hidden with Natsume Kagiya in the forest, Aoi Miyoshi and Kazura Iha enter the fort at night disguising themselves as soldiers, as they confront Kaburagi for using his captivity as a business offer. They are found out after knocking the president unconscious. Aoi later convinces Kazura to use his ability of teleportation to make their escape outside the fort. It turns out that Kaburagi signed a document to permit a shipment of weapons to the allies as well as the enemies.
2	"Rondo of Retrospection"; Transliteration: "Kaisō no Rondo" (Japanese: 回想のロンド)	April 12, 2010
Sakurai requests the group to investigate a Jewish Russian violinist named Sergei Krainev, who the Kwantung Army suspects is a foreign spy who has been leaking out classified military information to an unknown benefactor. Yukina is told privately by Sakurai that her older brother Isao Takachiho had disappeared to Manchuria after the death of her father. Aoi and Yukina sees no reason as to why or how Krainev could be a spy, after having met with him personally. While Krainev begins his performance at the town hall, Aoi and Yukina realize that the fast section of his piece is a coded message that will be broadcast by radio. Even though they cut off the power supply of the town hall in time, Krainev continues to play for the love of his music.
3	"Shadows Fall On The Big Four"; Transliteration: "Nerawareta Biggu Fō" (Japanese: 狙われたビッグフォー)	April 19, 2010
Yukina receives a letter from her missing brother, saying he wants to meet her, but overshadowing all that is the much more immediate bomb threat involving the four department stores in Shanghai known as the Big Four. The assailant lets Yukina read his mind, regarding the location of the three remaining bombs. While Aoi and Kazura search the other two stores to extinguish two of the bombs, Yukina and Natsume remain at the store where they are in to disarm the third one. It is revealed that the assailant is Kuse, who was sent to retrieve Yukina. Kuse is a subordinate of Isao with the abilities of teleportation and telepathy. To make matters worse, Aoi finds a young girl in one of the stores, also having to evade Kuse at the same time. As the four spies meet up with each other, Kuse retreats after being overwhelmed with their combined attacks.
4	"Cameras, Dumplings, and Stray Cats"; Transliteration: "Kamera to Baozu to Noraneko" (Japanese: カメラと包子(パオズ)と野良猫)	April 26, 2010
Feng Lan requests Aoi and Kazura to have some pictures taken of her restaurant's food so that her menu can compete with a rival Japanese restaurant's realistic replica. Aoi agrees to do it so he can get a free baozi while Kazura reluctantly complies since they are both professionals. However, after the photo shoot, a cat takes the bag containing the film of the menu as well as the film containing a summer vacation photo of a Japanese lieutenant. Aoi and Kazura are forced to investigate the Green Gang to recover the film but learn afterwards that the cat took the bag due to the smell of the baozi.
5	"Negative of Summer"; Transliteration: "Natsu no Inga" (Japanese: 夏の陰画)	May 3, 2010
Kazura recognizes his old friend Nishio in a photograph that Aoi has taken in a German delegate's house, resulting in Kazura investigating Nishio's whereabouts. However, he is captured and tortured by the Kuomintang and discovers that Nishio is a spy for the Chinese Communist Party. Released in exchange for information regarding a weapons smuggling involving the Comintern, Kazura approaches Nishio's lover Ailin, and the two briefly talk about him. During the weapons smuggling, Nishio escapes from the authorities and crosses paths with Kazura, who informs him that Ailin is waiting for him. Nishio disregards it and is later assassinated.
6	"An Ominous Night"; Transliteration: "Rankai no Yoru" (Japanese: 乱階の夜)	May 10, 2010
Sakurai reports to Aoi and Kazura that Isao might be involved with the Pan-Asianism movement. It is not soon after until Isao kidnaps Aoi and lets him listen to the Asian delegates' meeting at a tea parlor. Isao voices out his own ideals on Pan-Asianism, later encouraging Aoi to join in his group. Meanwhile, Kazura, Yukina, and Natsume mysteriously find a map toward the tea parlor placed by Kuse. Once outside the parlor, Kuse does his best to prevent them from interrupting.
6.5	"Prediction"; Transliteration: "Yogen" (Japanese: 予言)	May 17, 2010
This episode is a special recapitulation of events, which includes additional information on the main characters. This episode has an alternate telling of the seventh episode as well.
7	"The Incident"; Transliteration: "Jihen" (Japanese: 事変)	May 18, 2010
This episode was streamed exclusively online due to the controversy of the Mukden Incident. It depicts the point of view of the Japanese in Manchuria during the events leading up to the Mukden Incident. It revolves around two young newspaper reporters who are riding on the South Manchuria Railway and run into Kanji Ishiwara, the Lieutenant Colonel of the Kwantung Army who helped devise the bombing so that Japan could attack Manchuria out of "self-defense". Other key historical figures are also present such as Seishirō Itagaki and Yoshitsugu Tatekawa.
7.5	"Demon of the Opium Den"; Transliteration: "Ahenkutsu no Akuma" (Japanese: 阿片窟の悪魔)	September 22, 2010 (DVD only)
Sakurai orders the group to investigate an opium den which is said to be a hideout of spies. However, something went wrong with Yukina's abilities. As a result, she tried to figure out the events that had happened when she entered the den.
8	"In the Country of Frozen Earth"; Transliteration: "Tōdo no Kuni de" (Japanese: 凍土の国で)	May 24, 2010
After the Mukden Incident, Japan uses the opportunity to seize the entire Manchuria region in the next six months, leading to the establishment on Manchukuo led by Puyi, the last Qing emperor. The League of Nations sends in V. A. G. R. Bulwer-Lytton and his committee to investigate the situation, refusing to recognize Manchukuo as an independent nation. Afterwards, Isao kidnaps the delegation and shows them something as destructive as an atomic bomb in the Taklamakan Desert. He tells them report back to their country leaders of what they just saw along with the demand to relinquish control over countries they've colonized. Meanwhile, Sakurai requests the group to investigate on the "prophetess" whom Puyi will be meeting. However, Aoi catches a glimpse of his lover Shizune Yusa, whom he believed to have died before.
9	"The New Capital"; Transliteration: "Atarashiki Miyako" (Japanese: 新しき京)	May 31, 2010
Aoi follows the convoy where his fiancée Shizune is, but loses track of her. Going undercover, he infiltrates the building she is residing in, but is confronted by Kazura, undercover as an imperial guard, who expresses his disapproval of Aoi's subordination. Despite Kazura's attempt to stop him, Aoi escapes with Shizune. While in hiding in an abandoned house, Shizune reveals that she cannot leave with him because of her ability of foresight and her responsibility to guide leaders. While Aoi expresses that he will abandon everything to be with her, she disappears when he leaves to find a horse for them to escape. Meanwhile, Yukina meets her brother in the hotel, where she and Natsume are staying in. Isao lets her read his thoughts in which it shows the atomic bombings in Japan. Yukina collapses from shock and upon waking up, she finds the vision too traumatizing.
10	"East is East"; Transliteration: "Higashi wa Higashi" (Japanese: 東は東)	June 7, 2010
While Sakurai is displeased with Aoi's actions regarding the prophetess, he allows Aoi to remain in the group. Yukina hesitantly shares the vision Isao presented to her with the others, describing the vision as "hell". During the group's next mission to find evidence that the Chinese are smuggling in weapons from Germany at the Dalian port, Kazura is ambushed by a group of Westerners. When Isao comes to his aid, he reveals to Kazura a secret base run by Ichinose, where nuclear weapons are being developed and shares with him his ideals, inspired by the events of the First World War that concluded with the signing of the Treaty of Versailles in June 1919. Upon returning to the port, Aoi and Natsume set a trap for Isao. A conflicted Kazura, recalling the speech that Kanji Ishiwara gave when he was in military school, chooses to save Isao and teleports away, leaving Aoi, Yukina, and Natsume shocked by his actions.
11	"Hunt in the Dark"; Transliteration: "Yami no Tansaku" (Japanese: 闇の探索)	June 14, 2010
Sakurai shows little concern with Kazura's betrayal, noting that Aoi's actions with Shizune has changed the course of history because Puyi was unable to meet her. Meanwhile, Isao tells Kazura that a war between America and Japan is inevitable, based on the prophecy that his former fiancée made, and that they must prepare for it. Aoi and Natsume infiltrate Isao's base, where his subordinates are setting a bomb to destroy any evidence and weaponry they cannot take with them, and Aoi is shocked to see Shizune is with Isao. Kazura lets them escape and tells Aoi that his purpose of joining Isao is for the future of Japan and Asia, but lets his former teammates go before escaping with Shizune and Isao. Upon arriving at their destination, Kazura is surprised that Sakurai happens to be there.
12	"Night Raid"; Transliteration: "Yashū" (Japanese: 夜襲)	June 21, 2010
Aoi, Yukina, and Natsume have been clearly forsaken by Sakurai, who they have not seen for three months, but they continue to look for leads on Isao. Meanwhile, Isao and his men continue act discreetly as round-the-clock construction work occurs in Xinjing in preparation for Puyi's expedited inauguration ceremony as the new emperor of Manchukuo. Since the atomic bomb remains incomplete, Isao resorts to Shizune's abilities in which she will channel her vision of the atomic bombing to the important politicians who have gathered for the inauguration. After his men take control of the area, Isao announces that his threat to bomb Shanghai at midnight if the leaders from the Western powers fail to release their colonies in Asia.
13	"At Least a Fragment of Hope"; Transliteration: "Semete Kibō no Kakera o" (Japanese: せめて希望のかけらを)	June 28, 2010
Natsume is fatally injured by a random soldier after his fight with Kuse, but asks that his death be concealed from Yukina for the time being. Natsume's death causes Kazura to realize that he has been living in the past instead of looking forward to the future and he rejoins his former allies. When the Sakurai Kikan confront Isao, he explains that humanity must experience tragedy firsthand to avoid war again, but is refuted by Shizune, who suggests that Isao's actions were actually for the sake of his late fiancée. When Sakurai appears and shoots at Yukina, Isao takes the shot and dies. Having infiltrated Isao's group to eliminate him, Sakurai reveals his own interests in the nuclear arms to change fate, but his assistant Ichishi erases his memories. Shizune requests that Ichishi erase her memories so that no one will experience the same fate as her. Meanwhile, Aoi and Kazura combine their efforts to hijack the plane containing the atomic bomb and drop the weapon in the ocean. However, only Kazura is seen escaping the crashing plane, while Aoi's fate is left unspecified. Two years later, Yukina visits Feng Lan at her restaurant, where the latter shows her the group photo they took back in Hokuryou with Kazura added in it. Yukina hears a violin being played badly, reminiscent of Aoi. However, she sees that the Japanese Army is marching on the streets which indicates that the war is coming soon.
14	"Panther in the Snow"; Transliteration: "Setsujou no Hyou" (Japanese: 雪上の豹)	December 22, 2010 (DVD)
The episode acts as an epilogue to the main storyline. In 1936, Yukina visits Natsume's family in Japan to give back his belongings. Natsume's sister requests Yukina to give a five sen coin, which Natsume treasured, to their younger brother who is serving the Asabu regiment. Meanwhile, Kazura receives a mission from the Kempeitai to investigate on a group of young military officers who were planning a coup d'état. When he learns that they do intend to start a rebellion, he misleads the Kempeitai and is forced to flee when they realize Kazura has tricked them. Aoi, revealed to be still alive, and Yukina arrive to save him from execution. While hiding from the Kempeitai, Kazura reveals to his friends that he will join the rebellion. Yukina gives him Natsume's coin so that he will be the one to give it to Natsume's brother if they ever meet. After Kazura leaves, Aoi goes back home with Shizune, who no longer remembers the events in Manchuria. Yukina narrates that the rebellion that the young military officers started would be later known as the February 26 Incident. As she doesn't know Kazura's real name, Yukina is unable to ascertain his exact fate.

== Reception ==
Carl Kimlinger of Anime News Network found the story reminiscent of Ian Fleming's works, being in the pulp espionage genre, which he regarded as being a refreshing change from other anime series. Theron Martin felt the story seemed like a "particularly strong addition" to the "super powered secret spy" genre, and commended the attention to details in using Chinese dialogue, but felt the musical score did not always work with the show. Hope Chapman enjoyed that the stunts in the anime did not seem "implausible", and enjoyed the setting. Tim Maughan compared the show to Ghost in the Shell: Stand Alone Complex, and felt the exposition to be difficult to follow at times. Maughan enjoyed the "convincing noir atmosphere" and "exhilarating" action scenes. Rebecca Bundy felt that the first episode wasted time on exposition and did not build a picture of the relationships between the characters. Christopher Macdonald felt it had "a lot of potential".
