= Macross 7 =

Japanese anime television series and spinoffs

- Cover for the first Blu-ray box set.

マクロス7 (Makurosu Sebun)
- Genre: Mecha, musical, military science fiction
- Created by: Shōji Kawamori
- Anime television series
- Directed by: Tetsurō Amino
- Produced by: Kaya Oonish; Akira Iguchi
- Written by: Sukehiro Tomita
- Music by: Shirō Sagisu (stock music); Yoko Kanno (stock music)
- Studio: Ashi Productions
- Licensed by: Big West (licensing) Disney Platform Distribution (worldwide streaming license); NA: Crunchyroll (home video)
- Original network: JNN (MBS)
- Original run: October 16, 1994 – September 24, 1995
- Episodes: 49 + 3 OVAs
- Manga

Macross 7: Trash
- Written by: Haruhiko Mikimoto
- Published by: Kadokawa Shoten
- Magazine: Shōnen Ace
- Original run: October 18, 1994 – May 26, 2001
- Volumes: 8
- Manga

Macross 7: Valkyrie Rock
- Written by: Ochi Yoshihiko
- Published by: Shogakukan
- Magazine: Monthly CoroCoro Comic
- Original run: November 1994 – March 1995
- Anime film

Macross 7: The Galaxy is Calling Me!
- Directed by: Tetsurō Amino
- Produced by: Katsunori Haruta; Minoru Takanashi; Yoshio Tsuda
- Written by: Shōji Kawamori
- Music by: Shirō Sagisu (stock); Yoko Kanno (stock)
- Studio: Hal Film Maker; Studio Junio
- Licensed by: Big West (licensing) Disney Platform Distribution (worldwide streaming license); NA: Crunchyroll (home video)
- Released: September 30, 1995
- Runtime: 33 minutes
- Original video animation

Macross Dynamite 7
- Directed by: Tetsurō Amino
- Produced by: Minoru Takanashi; Hiroshi Katou; Hirotaka Kanda; Tomoko Yamazaki; Yume Moriya
- Written by: Shōji Kawamori (Note: Series composition); Sukehiro Tomita (Note: Screenplay)
- Music by: Shirō Sagisu (stock); Yoko Kanno (stock)
- Studio: Ashi Productions
- Licensed by: Big West (licensing) Disney Platform Distribution (worldwide streaming license)
- Released: December 18, 1997 – August 25, 1998
- Runtime: 30 minutes
- Episodes: 4
- Manga

Macross 7th Chord
- Written by: Akira Kano
- Published by: Kadokawa Shoten
- Magazine: Macross Ace
- Original run: January 2009 – March 2011
- Volumes: 1
- Anime film

Macross Fb7 Listen to My Song!
- Directed by: Tetsurō Amino
- Written by: Shōji Kawamori (Note: Story); Tetsurō Amino (Note: Screenplay)
- Studio: Satelight
- Licensed by: Big West (licensing) Disney Platform Distribution (worldwide streaming license)
- Released: October 20, 2012
- Runtime: 90 minutes
- icon

Macross 7 (マクロス7, Makurosu Sebun) is an anime television series. It is a sequel to the show The Super Dimension Fortress Macross that takes place many years after the events of the first series following a cast of mostly new characters. The show ran from October 16, 1994, to September 24, 1995, at 11:00 a.m., and 49 episodes were aired. Although it has been distributed in the other parts of the world, it remained unlicensed in North America until July 2022 when Right Stuf along with Nozomi Entertainment announced that they would be releasing the series on home video.

Macross 7 is best known for its music, and since the show began airing over a dozen albums have been released by the fictional band Fire Bomber that stars in the show. Macross 7 exists in the official Studio Nue chronology and canon, with story concept by Shoji Kawamori, who also handled mechanical designs along with Kazutaka Miyatake. A theatrical episode, Macross 7: The Galaxy is Calling Me!, was released in 1995. Several OVAs were also released, including Macross 7: Encore and later, Macross Dynamite 7. In 2012, a crossover movie retelling the Macross 7 events by Macross Frontier characters, Macross Fb7 Listen to My Song!, was released.

== Synopsis ==
Thirty-five years after the events of the original The Super Dimension Fortress Macross, a spacecraft called Macross 7 leads the 37th colonial fleet on a colonization mission into deep space. The story focuses on the fleet's encounters with an alien force called the Protodeviln, and especially events surrounding a rock and roll band called Fire Bomber, consisting of Basara Nekki (lead singer), Mylene Flare Jenius (seventh daughter of Maximilian Jenius and Milia Fallyna Jenius), Ray Lovelock, and full blooded Zentradi Veffidas Feaze.

The fleet's flagship is the Macross 7, which is actually composed of two parts: Battle 7 and City 7. Battle 7 is the fore section of the ship. It is a fully transformable battle carrier that is able to separate itself from City 7 during battle. Battle 7 is captained by original series regular Maximilian Jenius, who is also the commander of the entire fleet. The much larger back section of the two part ship is known as City 7 and is the main civilian population center of the fleet, containing a population in excess of one million people. The mayor of City 7 is the estranged wife of Maximilian Jenius, Milia Fallyna Jenius. City 7 features a "shell" that can close in order to protect the civilian population during battle.

In the seventh year of their mission the Macross 7 fleet encounters an unknown alien enemy. This new mysterious enemy is composed of heavily modified Valkyries led by a man named Gigil. In the first encounter, the Macross 7 engages the enemy with squadrons of their own Valkyries. This conventional warfare does little to stop the attack however. The enemy's tactics are different from the average rogue, or 'uncultured', Zentradi that are encountered in space travel. In the first battle with the Macross 7 fleet, the new enemy's main tactic is to extract an energy form called 'Spiritia' from the Valkyrie pilots, leaving them in a vegetative state.

Civilian musician Basara Nekki has a modified red state of the art VF-19 "Fire" Valkyrie of his own, and goes out to engage the enemy of his own accord. His VF-19 has an unusual control scheme that mimics a guitar, and he does not attack the enemy with weapons, choosing instead to fire speaker pods into enemy mecha, and playing his songs to the enemy. In the first few encounters, Basara's music does little to drive the enemy away, and the Macross 7 fleet's ace pilot, Gamlin Kizaki is bewildered and annoyed by Basara's endeavor, claiming that it interferes with the other pilots during combat.

It is eventually revealed that Basara Nekki was given the Valkyrie by his friend and bandmate Ray Lovelock, who is a former UN Spacy Valkyrie pilot, and part of secret project inspired by the effectiveness of Lynn Minmay's singing in the original war with the Zentradi. Eventually project head, Dr. Chiba, discovers that Spiritia deprived vegetative pilots can be revived. By playing them Fire Bomber's music the patients eventually wake up and return to normal.

Eventually the enemy infiltrates City 7 and begins extracting Spiritia from civilians. Due to the secretive nature of the infiltrators and the state of their victims, they are dubbed 'vampires' by the public forum. One of the 'vampires' is captured and revealed to be a human from an earlier lost space mission. A brainwashing mechanism found inside the helmet of the 'vampire' is used to control them. The captured prisoner is exposed to Fire Bomber's music and regains his memories. The prisoner, now revealed to be a Blue Rhinoceros elite squadron pilot, Irana Hayakawa, tells his story. Harakawa stated that the Blue Rhinoceros was a team sent to investigate the fourth planet of the Varautan system, which apparently holds Protoculture secrets, or even descendants of the Protoculture themselves. They were supposed to rendezvous with the United Forces Advisor Ivano Gunther, only to find that Gunther was possessed by an alien entity called the Protodeviln. The entire mission force is taken by the Protodeviln and used to assemble the new Supervision Army that is attacking the Macross 7 fleet.

City 7 is stolen by the Protodeviln, and for a short period of time it is separated from the rest of the fleet. Eventually they are rescued. After this the elite fighter squadron Diamond Force is permanently assigned to City 7 as a special defense force.

The Sound Force is created by the UN Spacy, and all the members of Fire Bomber are given their own specially modified Valkyries. They are sent out to confront the enemy with their music whenever the fleet is attacked.

The Macross 7 fleet gathers information in an attempt to understand their new enemy, while Geperuniti, the leader of the Protodeviln, begins to take steps towards achieving his goal of creating a Spiritia Farm, capable of producing an endless supply of the energy force that the Protodeviln depend on for life. With a generous supply of Spiritia being collected by the 'vampires', other Protodevilns begin to awaken from their sleep. One of them, named Sivil, goes to attack the Macross fleet. During the first encounter between Basara and Sivil, the effectiveness of his music was proven when it drove Sivil away. Sivil becomes interested in Basara, whom she refers to as the Anima Spiritia. Gigil leaves the Protodeviln fleet and joins the 'vampires' in City 7. Eventually due to constant contact with Basara and his music, Sivil begins to lose strength. She hides away in a separate "forest" section of City 7, and eventually goes into a state of hibernation, encasing herself in a force field. Basara discovers Sivil and sings to her daily in the hope of waking her up. Gigil watches Basara from the shadows, and collects Spiritia in order to help revive Sivil.

Around this time, Dr. Chiba discovers that Basara's singing creates what he calls Sound Energy. He creates the 'Sound Boosters', an attachment for the Sound Force Valkyries, in order to amplify and control the projection of this energy in battle.

Meanwhile, another colonization fleet, the Macross 5, makes contact with the Macross 7 fleet. The Macross 5 fleet has found a suitable planet to inhabit, and christened it as the planet Rax. However, soon the Macross 7 fleet loses all contact with the Macross 5. Arriving at Rax, they find the whole Macross 5 fleet decimated, but oddly few dead bodies are found. They assume that the people of the Macross 5 fleet were in fact taken captive by the Protodeviln. The Protodeviln fleet surrounds the planet forcing the Macross 7 fleet to remain on its surface.

At this time the military found out about Sivil being in the forest section of City 7 and takes her away to be studied. Gigil rampages in his Battroid in an attempt to find and rescue Sivil. Together he and Basara managed to awakened Sivil, who escapes from the laboratory.

Basara decides to search the planet for Sivil. Finally, he and Gigil find her inside an active volcano. Basara begins singing and manages to awaken her. When Sivil is awakened, the volcano suddenly begin to sink into the ocean. After the dust clears a ruin rises from sea. The ruins are investigated by the non micronized Zentradi Exsedol Folmo, who is now the top science advisor in the Macross 7 fleet. He concludes that it is a ruin from the Protoculture. The ruins reveal the mysterious genesis of the Protodeviln and how they were defeated by the Protoculture using something called the Anima Spiritia. In the end, the ruins are destroyed by Geperuniti's fleet and another pair of Protodeviln called Glavil and Gavil. This happens before the Macross crew can find out exactly what Anima Spiritia is.

Geperuniti now views Sivil and Gigil as a threat to his plans of creating a Spiritia Farm and orders his Protodeviln henchmen, Valgo, Gavil and Glavil to pursue and kill them. In the ensuing battle Gigil takes on his true form, and begins to sing Basara's music. He discovers that he can actually generate his own Spiritia this way. Gigil defends Sivil to his death, causing the entire planet Rax to explode.

Basara and Sivil mourn for Gigil while the battle with Geperuniti intensifies. The UN Government of Earth gives the permission to Captain Maximilian Jenius to use the illegal Reaction Weaponry against the Protodeviln. Captain Jenius forms a plan called Operation Stargazer in which a few elite volunteer pilots will accompany him to the fourth planet of the Varautan system, now known to be the base of Protodeviln operations. The mission is to stealthily attack the planet and plant the Reaction Weaponry in the chamber which houses the Protodevilns' bodies. Mayor Milia Fallyna Jenius is given temporary command of the fleet during the mission. Amongst the volunteers for this mission are the entire Sound Force.

Basara decides to do things his way and starts singing as soon as he reaches the planet. Surrounded by heavy fire, Diamond Force leader Gamlin Kizaki decides to focus on defending the Sound Force. He eventually crashes his Valkyrie unto Gavil's FBz-99G Zaubergern mecha, destroying it, but also appearing to be killed himself. When all looks lost the real plan of Operation Stargazer is revealed as Captain Jenius folds into the battle in a new advanced VF-22S Sturmvogel II Valkyrie carrying the Reaction Weapon. He races into the heart of the enemy stronghold, plants the weapon, and orders everyone to flee. But the mission is thwarted when in the last minute when the ingenious Geperuniti folds the Reaction Weapon to the location of Operation Stargazer group's Northhampton class frigate, destroying it.

The surviving members of the operation are captured by the Protodeviln, but they eventually manage to escape their holding cells. Just then Gamlin reappears in a Varautan Mecha, and helps defend the escapees against Gavil's attacks. While escaping, they discovered the Protodevilns have imprisoned the captured Macross 5 people, encasing them in a crystal-like chamber, and extracting their Spiritia. Basara tries to save them, but his efforts are in vain and they are forced to evacuate the area before Geperuniti destroys them. They escape using one of the Varautan space cruisers.

After escaping, Gamlin was possessed by Gavil, and he takes his VF-17D Nightmare Valkyrie and goes on a rampage through the Macross 7. The Sound Force were deployed and Basara and Mylene started singing. Gavil then captured Mylene and demands that Basara surrenders to the Protodeviln. Just then, Mylene steps out of her Valkyrie and starts singing, drawing out the possessed Gamlin out of his Valkyrie. Gavil is forced to depart from Gamlin and flees.

In another battle, the newly awakened Protodeviln twins, Zomd and Goram confronts the Macross 7 Fleet. Bringing along the crystal-like chambers containing the Macross 5 people, Basara's music was turned against him - as his music would serve to regenerate the Spiritia of the captured Macross 5 people, which later would be extracted from them to revive the Protodeviln twins. However, Captain Maximilian Jenius devises a plan to use the fold generators on the chambers and the plan was carried out by Gamlin and Docker, the leader of the Emerald Force. When the chambers are safely folded away, all the ships in the fleet fire their Reaction Weaponries. Although the Protodeviln twins were severely injured, they miraculously regenerated. Basara begins to sing and drives them mad. Sivil shows up and drives the Protodeviln away, but her powers are drained, and she crashes into Battle 7. Basara tries to revive her, but she accidentally drains him of his Spiritia, putting him into a vegetative state.

In the last part of the series, Geperuniti takes on his true form, which is an enormous Spiritia "Black Hole" that will eventually drain the entire universe of Spiritia. Under the command of Captain Maximilian Jenius, Battle 7 folded to the Protodeviln's base, begins to transform in order to fire the Sound Buster - the combination of Song Energy and the Macross Cannon. Firing several rounds of the Sound Buster, the Macross Cannon overloads and explodes. A strange reaction occurs, and Geperuniti begins to lose control of himself.

Waves of energy hit Battle 7 and prove to be too powerful for even the pinpoint barrier to withstand. Battle 7 is destroyed and the crews flee to safety. Geperuniti begins to extract Spiritia from everyone, even folding the rest of the Macross 7 fleet, including City 7 in order to extract more Spiritia. Geperuniti even goes against his own kind, killing Zomd and Goram. Gavil and Gravil, then, goes against Geperuniti, trying to convince him to stop. At the very last minute, Basara awakens when everyone begins singing to him, and goes out to fight Geperuniti. Together with Sivil they sing to Geperuniti until he also begins to sing. Geperuniti realizes that he can create his own Spiritia through music, and takes on a new form. He and his host of remaining Protodeviln then leave this galaxy to explore the rest of the universe. Sivil tells Basara that she will always remember his songs, and goes off with her kind.

== Characters ==
=== New characters ===
- Basara Nekki (Nobutoshi Hayashi, Yoshiki Fukuyama [singing])
- Mylene Flare Jenius (Tomo Sakurai, Chie Kajiura [singing])
- Ray Lovelock (Masashi Sugawara)
- Veffidas Feaze (Urara Takano)
- Gamlin Kizaki (Takehito Koyasu)
- Akiko Hojo (Urara Takano)
- Michael Johnson (Takehiro Murozono)
- Miho Miho (Rio Natsuki)
- Sally (Junko Iwao)
- Kinryu (Hiroki Takahashi)
- Docker (Takashi Nagasako)
- Physica S. Fulcrum (Akio Suyama)
- Rex (Kaoru Shimamura)
- Dr. Chiba (Keiichi Sonobe)
- Girl with Flowers (Akiko Nakagawa)

=== Returning characters ===
- Maximilian Jenius (Sho Hayami)
- Milia Fallyna Jenius (Eri Takeda)
- Exsedol Folmo (Ryunosuke Ohbayashi)

=== Protodeviln ===
- Lord Geppernich (You Inoue)
- Gigil (Tomohiro Nishimura)
- Sivil (Akiko Nakagawa)
- Grabil
- Gavil (Akio Suyama)
- Valgo (Hiroki Takahashi)
- Goram (Arihiro Hase)
- Zomd (Rei Igarashi)

== Media ==
=== Movies ===
==== Macross 7: The Galaxy is Calling Me! ====
Macross 7: The Galaxy is Calling Me! (劇場版マクロス7 銀河がオレを呼んでいる!, Gekijō-ban Makurosu Sebun Ginga ga Ore o Yondeiru!) is a theatrical episode of Macross 7. It is estimated to take place around episodes 38-41 of Macross 7, and was shown alongside Macross Plus: Movie Edition. The story tells of how Basara Nekki and Mylene Flare Jenius' sister, Emilia Jenius became acquainted. Basara winds up on an icy planet due to a fold accident. The townsfolk he encounters say a monster lives in the mountains, which causes Basara to investigate. He then meets Emilia Jenius, a full-sized Meltlan who sings on the planet because her voice is too loud for populated worlds. Emilia, who sports Milia Fallyna Jenius' green hair, aspires to be like Lynn Minmay, flies a Queadlunn Ouilqua Power Armor—a custom variant. Emilia's singing causes an Anima Spiritia irregularity, causing the Protodevilin, Gavil, Glavil and Natter-Valgo to investigate on orders by Lord Gepernich. Basara and Emilia fight the Protodevilin with song after Basara throws his VF-19-Kai "Fire Valkyrie" in the way of Emilia's missiles attacking Glavil. With the help of the other Sound Force members who show up during the battle, along with Gamlin Kizaki, the Protodevilins are repelled and flee. However, Emilia's custom power armor is destroyed during the battle while saving the townsfolk from a flood.

==== Macross Fb7 ====
A crossover retelling of the Macross 7 events by the subsequent series Macross Frontier characters, Macross Fb7 Listen to My Song! (with "Fb" for Fire Bomber), was released in 2012 in celebration of Macross 30th anniversary. Macross Fb7 was a full-length theatrical movie that continued the Macross 7 and Macross Frontier series' story.

=== OVAs ===
==== Macross 7: Encore ====
The Macross 7: Encore (マクロス7 アンコール, Makurosu Sebun Ankōru) OVA consists of three unrelated episodes set in the original Macross 7 TV series timeline. It is speculated that the story of Macross 7: Encore takes place around episodes 39-42 of Macross 7. The first episode, "Fleet of the Strongest Women", the Macross 7 fleet encountered a fleet of uncultured Meltlandi led by Chlore, an ace pilot rival of Milia. The second episode, "On Stage", details the story behind Basara Nekki, Ray Lovelock and Veffidas Feaze and describes how the rock band Fire Bomber was formed. Lastly, in the third episode, "Which One Do You Like?", Milia Fallyna Jenius thinks that she is dying due to her micronization, and thus desires to fulfill her last objectives before she 'departs'.

==== Macross Dynamite 7 ====
Macross Dynamite 7 (マクロスダイナマイト7, Makurosu Dainamaito Sebun) is an OVA set one year after the events in Macross 7. Released in 1997 in celebration of the Macross 15th anniversary, Macross Dynamite 7 was a four episode OVA that continued the Macross 7 series' story. A subplot that involved the drugging and sexual assault of Mylene was removed when the OVA series was released on streaming services in Japan and overseas in 2025.

=== Manga ===
==== Macross 7: Trash ====
Macross 7: Trash (マクロス7 トラッシュ, Makurosu Sebun Trash) is an eight-volume manga series by Macross character designer Haruhiko Mikimoto, serving as a side-story to Macross 7. Trash takes place early during the year 2046, focusing on Shiva Midou (a young "T-Crush" athlete who is rumored to be an illegitimate son of the famous Max Jenius), Mahala Fabrio (an ex-military officer), and Enika Cherryni (Shiva's girlfriend, who becomes the next "Minmay Voice" singing idol), as the three become entwined in a military plot. Unlike many other Macross manga, Trash does not feature any mecha or combat, instead focusing on the characters themselves. It was serialized for 52 monthly chapters in Shōnen Ace magazine from October 1994 to May 2001, then published as tankōbon from 1995 to 2001 by Kadokawa Shoten. In 2003, Tokyopop announced that they would be working with Harmony Gold to bring the Macross 7: Trash manga to the West with a slated spring 2004 release. However, licensing issues (likely due to legal complications regarding the Macross franchise rights in the west at the time) caused the release to get cancelled.

Trash takes place in the Macross 7 fleet early during the year 2046 of Macross timeline. The story revolves around a sport called "T-Crush", similar to roller derby but with air blades (hovering roller blades) and fighting. As the story progresses, weapons are added to the equipment and it becomes a one-on-one combat tournament.

Another plot element is the "Mind System" used to power the weapons in the tournament. The system was in development 7 years before the story begins and it caused a fatal accident during a military training session. On the surface, the system converts the emotions of a person into energy but the true functionality of the system is hidden until late in the story.

The story starts with Mahala quitting the military and being asked by Colonel Bacelon to seek out talented people and recruit them as pilots. By chance, she meets Shiva, a T-Crush player, and she becomes the coach of his team. Bacelon supplies the teams with weapons powered with the Mind System and organizes a tournament. Mahala became suspicious of Bacelon's intentions but is forced to cooperate after she was caught breaking into his data files. The team makes their way to the final where the truth is revealed.

===== Characters =====
- Shiva Midou (シバ御堂, Shiba Midō): A young "T-Crush" athlete who is rumored to be an illegitimate son of the famous Maximilian Jenius.
- Enika Cherryni (エニカ·チェリーニ, Enika Cherīni): Shiva's girlfriend, who becomes the next "Minmay Voice" singing idol.
- Mahala Fabrio (マハラ·ファブリオー, Mahara Faburiō): An ex-military officer. She was the teacher of the student who died in the accident 7 years ago.

===== Volumes =====
No.	Release date	ISBN
1	April 26, 1995	4-04-713105-9
2	November 28, 1995	4-04-713122-9
3	June 26, 1996	4-04-713142-3
4	May 30, 1997	4-04-713183-0
5	October 29, 1997	4-04-713198-9
6	July 29, 1998	4-04-713230-6
7	July 27, 1999	4-04-713293-4
8	June 27, 2001	4-04-713397-3

== International release ==
Due to a legal dispute over the distribution rights of the Macross franchise, involving Studio Nue and Big West against Harmony Gold, much of the Macross merchandise, including Macross 7, have not received an international release.

However, on March 1, 2021, Big West, Studio Nue and Harmony Gold reached an agreement on the international distribution of most Macross sequels and films. On July 2, 2022, during an Anime Expo panel held by Right Stuf and Nozomi Entertainment, they announced that Macross 7 would be getting its first North American home video release on Blu-Ray via two sets being regular and collector's edition Blu-Rays, respectively.

== Soundtrack ==
Macross 7 is unique from other Macross titles, as it does not have its own musical score. Instead, it relies heavily on songs by Fire Bomber as its soundtrack. The series also reuses selected BGM tracks and songs from Macross II and Macross Plus.

== Episode list ==
=== TV series ===
No.	Title	Original release date
1	"Speaker Pod"; Transliteration: "Supīkā Poddo" (Japanese: スピーカーポッド)	October 16, 1994
2	"Spiritia Level"; Transliteration: "Supirichia Reberu" (Japanese: スピリチアレベル)	October 23, 1994
3	"Fire Scramble"; Transliteration: "Faiā Sukuranburu" (Japanese: ファイアースクランブル)	October 30, 1994
4	"Vampire Soldier"; Transliteration: "Banpaia Sorujā" (Japanese: バンパイアソルジャー)	November 6, 1994
5	"Spirit Girls"; Transliteration: "Supiritto Gyaru" (Japanese: スピリットギャル)	November 13, 1994
6	"First Contact"; Transliteration: "Fāsuto Kontakuto" (Japanese: ファーストコンタクト)	November 20, 1994
7	"Summer Accident"; Transliteration: "Samā Akushidento" (Japanese: サマーアクシデント)	November 27, 1994
8	"Virgin Bomber"; Transliteration: "Bājin Bonbā" (Japanese: バージンボンバー)	December 4, 1994
9	"Angel Night"; Transliteration: "Enjeru Naito" (Japanese: エンジェルナイト)	December 11, 1994
10	"Deep Ballad"; Transliteration: "Dīpu Barādo" (Japanese: ディープバラード)	December 18, 1994
11	"Minmay Video"; Transliteration: "Minmei Bideo" (Japanese: ミンメイビデオ)	December 25, 1994
12	"Spiritia Farm"; Transliteration: "Supirichia Fāmu" (Japanese: スピリチアファーム)	January 8, 1995
13	"Fold Out"; Transliteration: "Fōrudo Auto" (Japanese: フォールドアウト)	January 15, 1995
14	"Fighting Woman Mayor Milia"; Transliteration: "Tatakau Onna Shichō Miria" (Japanese: 戦う女市長ミリア)	January 22, 1995
15	"A Girl's Jealousy"; Transliteration: "Otome no Jerashī" (Japanese: 乙女のジェラシー)	January 29, 1995
16	"Music Box on the Battlefield"; Transliteration: "Senjō no Orugōru" (Japanese: 戦場のオルゴール)	February 5, 1995
17	"Pretty Devil"; Transliteration: "Puriti Debiru" (Japanese: プリティデビル)	February 12, 1995
18	"Falling Little Devil"; Transliteration: "Ochiteiku Koakuma" (Japanese: おちていく小悪魔)	February 19, 1995
19	"Deadly Date"; Transliteration: "Inochigake no Dēto" (Japanese: 命がけのデート)	February 26, 1995
20	"Lady Biker's Temptation"; Transliteration: "Redīsu no Yūwaku" (Japanese: レディースの誘惑)	March 5, 1995
21	"Dangerous Kiss"; Transliteration: "Abunai Kisu" (Japanese: あぶないKISS)	March 12, 1995
22	"Men of Burning Passion"; Transliteration: "Atsuki Honō no Otokotachi" (Japanese: 熱き炎の男たち)	March 19, 1995
23	"Sound Force"; Transliteration: "Saundo Fōsu" (Japanese: サウンドフォース)	March 26, 1995
24	"Merry-Go-Round"; Transliteration: "Merī Gō Raundo" (Japanese: メリーゴーランド)	April 2, 1995
25	"Midnight Duet"; Transliteration: "Shin'ya no Deyuetto" (Japanese: 深夜のデュエット)	April 9, 1995
26	"Deadly Battle at Planet Lux"; Transliteration: "Wakusei Rakusu no Shitō" (Japanese: 惑星ラクスの死闘)	April 16, 1995
27	"Rainbow-Colored Song Energy"; Transliteration: "Nanairo no Uta Enajī" (Japanese: 七色の歌エナジー)	April 23, 1995
28	"New Sound Weapon"; Transliteration: "Saundo Shin Heiki" (Japanese: サウンド新兵器)	April 30, 1995
29	"Dad and Mom Fall in Love Again"; Transliteration: "Papa, Mama Ai Futatabi" (Japanese: パパ、ママ愛再び)	May 7, 1995
30	"Formula for a Love Triangle"; Transliteration: "Sankaku Kankei no Kōshiki" (Japanese: 三角関係の公式)	May 14, 1995
31	"Scandal of Passion"; Transliteration: "Netsuai Sukyandaru" (Japanese: 熱愛スキャンダル)	May 21, 1995
32	"Jamming Birds"; Transliteration: "Jamingu Bāzu" (Japanese: ジャミングバーズ)	May 28, 1995
33	"Betrayal and a Girl's Tears"; Transliteration: "Uragiri to Shōjo no Namida" (Japanese: 裏切りと少女の涙)	June 4, 1995
34	"The Day Gigil Sang"; Transliteration: "Gigiru ga Utatta Hi" (Japanese: ギギルが歌った日)	June 11, 1995
35	"A Night for Two"; Transliteration: "Futari Dake no Yoru" (Japanese: ふたりだけの夜)	June 18, 1995
36	"Men's Blazing Song"; Transliteration: "Otoko-tachi no Nekka" (Japanese: 男たちの熱歌)	June 25, 1995
37	"Mystery of the Cosmic Ruins?"; Transliteration: "Uchū Iseki no Nazo?" (Japanese: 宇宙遺跡のナゾ?)	July 2, 1995
38	"Sivil of the Forbidden Planet"; Transliteration: "Kindan Wakusei no Shibiru" (Japanese: 禁断惑星のシビル)	July 9, 1995
39	"Basara Returns"; Transliteration: "Kaettekita Basara" (Japanese: 帰ってきたバサラ)	July 16, 1995
40	"A Message That Pierces Stars"; Transliteration: "Hoshi o Koeru Omoi" (Japanese: 星を越える想い)	July 23, 1995
41	"I Love Mylene!"; Transliteration: "Mirēnu Daisuki!" (Japanese: ミレーヌ大好き!)	July 30, 1995
42	"Risky Capture"; Transliteration: "Kesshi no Hokaku Daisakusen" (Japanese: 決死の捕獲大作戦)	August 6, 1995
43	"Partings"; Transliteration: "Sorezore no Wakare" (Japanese: それぞれの別れ)	August 13, 1995
44	"Nightmarish Strike Operation"; Transliteration: "Akumu no Totsunyū Sakusen" (Japanese: 悪夢の突入作戦)	August 20, 1995
45	"Ambition on Varauta 4"; Transliteration: "Yabō no Dai 4 Wakusei" (Japanese: 野望の第4惑星)	August 27, 1995
46	"Gamlin's Revolt"; Transliteration: "Gamurin no Hanran" (Japanese: ガムリンの反乱)	September 3, 1995
47	"The Death of Basara"; Transliteration: "Basara Shisu" (Japanese: バサラ死す)	September 10, 1995
48	"Mylene's Emotional Song"; Transliteration: "Mirēnu Namida no Nesshō" (Japanese: ミレーヌ涙の熱唱)	September 17, 1995
49	"A Song Heard Across the Galaxy"; Transliteration: "Ginga ni Hibiku Utagoe" (Japanese: 銀河に響く歌声)	September 24, 1995

=== Encore ===
No.	Title	Original release date
1	"Fleet of the Strongest Women"; Transliteration: "Saikyō Onna no Kantai" (Japanese: 最強女の艦隊)	December 18, 1995
2	"On Stage"; Transliteration: "On Sutēji" (Japanese: オンステージ)	December 18, 1995
3	"Which One Do You Like?"; Transliteration: "Docchi ga Suki na no?" (Japanese: どっちが好きなの?)	February 25, 1996

=== Macross Dynamite 7 ===
No.	Title	Original release date
1	"Wonder"; Transliteration: "Hyōryū - Wonder -" (Japanese: 漂流 - WONDER -)	December 18, 1997
2	"Cemetery"; Transliteration: "Hakaba - Cemetery -" (Japanese: 墓場 - CEMETERY -)	February 25, 1998
3	"Lonesome"; Transliteration: "Kodoku - Lonesome -" (Japanese: 孤独 - LONESOME -)	May 25, 1998
4	"Zola - The Planet Where Galactic Whales Sing"; Transliteration: "Ginga Kujira no Utau Hoshi - Zola -" (Japanese: 銀河クジラの歌う星 - ZOLA -)	August 25, 1998

== Reception ==
Writing for The Encyclopedia of Science Fiction, Piotr Konieczny argued that Macross 7 pushed the franchise's recurring theme of music as a force for peace to its logical extreme, portraying Basara's pacifism as a deliberate critique of mecha genre conventions. He praised the series' anti-militarist themes and optimistic emphasis on communication across cultures, but criticized its repetitive battles, filler-heavy pacing, and extensive reuse of animation, noting that the story would have benefited from a substantially shorter adaptation.

== References in other media ==
- In the anime adaptation of the manga All Purpose Cultural Cat Girl Nuku Nuku, a parody of Macross 7 features a Basara look-alike who sings about saving the universe.

== Sources ==
- Macross Compendium
- Macross Nexus
- MAHQ Macross 7
