= Animax Anison Grand Prix =

Japanese anime music competition

The Animax Anison Grand Prix (全日本アニソングランプリ, Zen-Nihon Anison Guran Puri) is a Japanese anime song music competition, organized by Animax, in association with Jupiter Telecommunications.

== Outline ==
The annual competition is first held across a series of preliminaries in several Japanese cities, with the chosen finalists performing at a final round, which will be broadcast across Japan on Animax, where they will be judged by a panel of celebrity judges, music producers and record company executives, including noted singers Ichirō Mizuki, Mitsuko Horie and Yumi Matsuzawa. The winner of the competition will subsequently perform a theme song to an Animax anime project as their debut and earn a professional contract with Sony Music Japan.

== History ==
The first Animax All-Japan Anison Grand Prix was held in July 2007, with preliminaries taking place across Tokyo, Osaka, Fukuoka and Sapporo, and was attended by 1792 applicants. The winner of the competition was Shūhei Kita, who subsequently performed "Breakin' Through", the opening theme to the anime series Persona: Trinity Soul as his debut, and earned a professional contract with Sony Music Japan. Kita subsequently also performed "Issei no Sei", the opening theme to the Natsume Yūjin-Chō anime series in 2008.

The second competition, in 2008, was attended by 3186 applicants, with preliminaries held across Tokyo, Osaka, Nagoya, Fukuoka and Sapporo, with eleven chosen finalists performing at the final round, held in JCB Hall in Tokyo in September 2008, and was won by the Tokyo-based Canadian Catherine St. Onge, who will perform the theme song, produced by Shintarō Tokita of Sukima Switch, to an Animax anime project, and earn a professional contract with Sony Music Japan. In the first round, she performed Silly-go-round from .hack//Roots, while in the second round, she performed Adesso e Fortuna ~Honō to Eien~ from Record of Lodoss War. Animax subsequently broadcast the "2nd All-Japan Anison Grand Prix Special", marking its tenth anniversary, on November 16, 2008, featuring live performances by judge and noted anime singer Ichiro Mizuki, idol group AKB48 and singers Akira Kushida, Nana Kitade, the previous competition's winner Shūhei Kita, and numerous others.

In February 2009, it was announced that St. Onge, under her chosen moniker Himeka, would perform the theme song, produced by Tokita of Sukima Switch, to the anime adaptation of Valkyria Chronicles (a.k.a. Senjō no Valkyria: Gallian Chronicles), which will air from April 2009, across Animax and other Japanese broadcast networks.

The vocal group AG7 is made up of the seven winners of the first to seventh Anison Grand Prix held in 2014. The group performed 'Endless NOVA', as an ending theme for the anime series 'Battle Spirits: Ultimate Zero'. The song was released on a double A-side single with "ZERO" by Grand Prix winner #7 Tatsuyuki Kobayashi.

== Event schedule ==
Number	year	preliminary							Final	Winner
Number	year	Sapporo	Sendai	Tokyo	Nagoya	Osaka	Fukuoka	Okinawa	Final	Winner
First	2007	July 1	-	July 16	-	July 15	July 8	-	August 1	Shūhei Kita
Second	2008	July 19	-	August 23	August 6	July 26	August 16	-	September 21	Catherine St. Onge (HIMEKA)
Third	2009	July 18	-	July 20	July 4	July 5	June 27	July 11	September 21	Sayaka Sasaki
Fourth	2010	June 27	July 3	July 17	July 10	July 11	June 24	-	September 25	Marina Kawano
Fifth	2011	June 25; July 16	-	July 10; August 6	July 2 July 23	July 3 July 23	July 9 July 30	-	October 9	Konomi Suzuki

※Finals are held in Tokyo.

== See also ==
- List of animation awards
