= Yoshiki Fukuyama =

Japanese musician, singer and songwriter (born 1963)

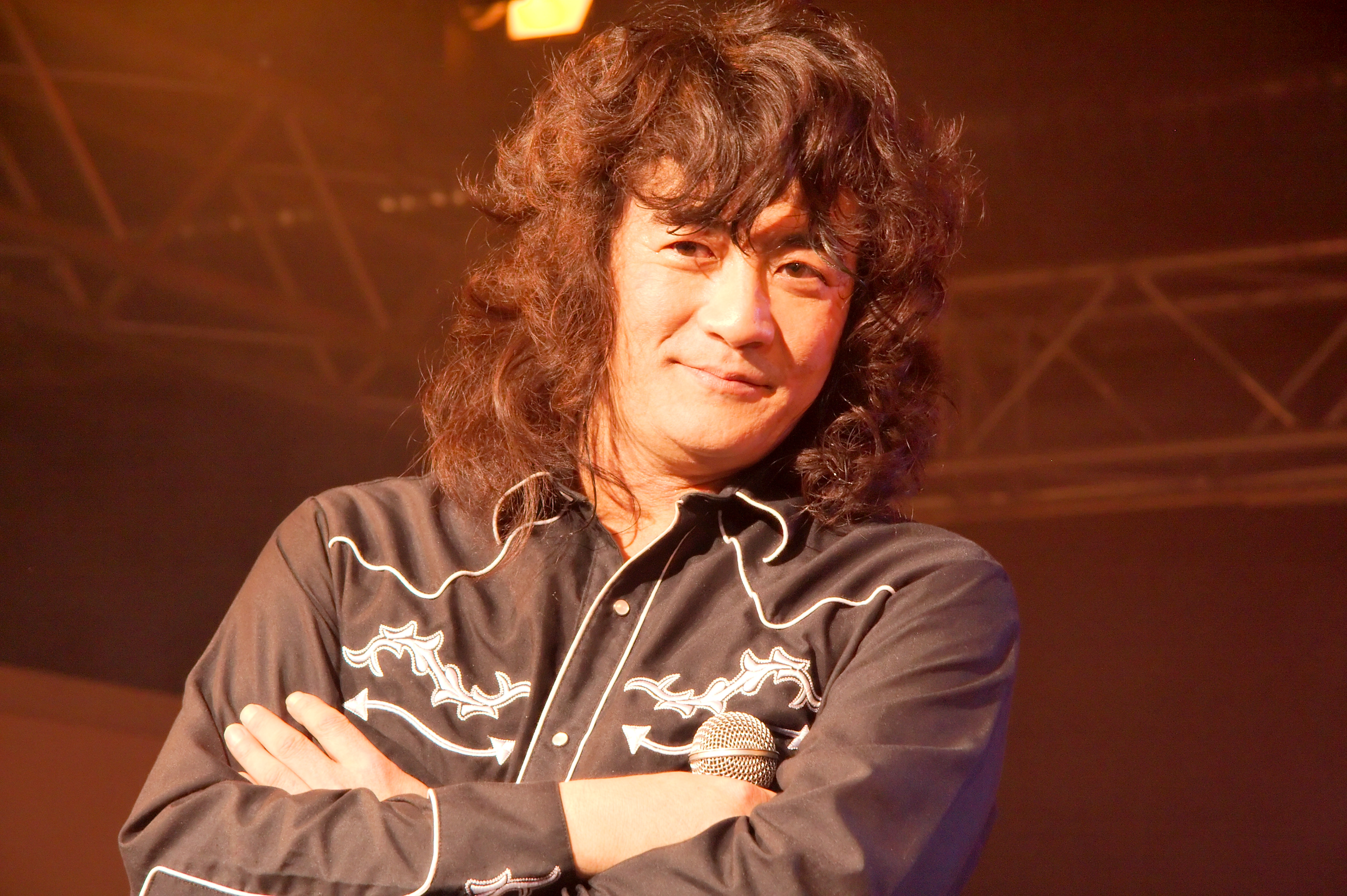
- Fukuyama performing as part of JAM Project in Paris

Background information
- Born: September 14, 1963 (age 62); Tokyo, Japan
- Origin: Raised in Kamakura, Kanagawa Prefecture, Japan
- Genres: Rock
- Occupations: Musician, singer, songwriter
- Instruments: Guitar, piano, vocals
- Years active: 1988-present
- Labels: Seesonic (GENEON), Lantis
- Website: fukuyama-yoshiki.net

Yoshiki Fukuyama (福山 芳樹, Fukuyama Yoshiki; born September 14, 1963) is a Japanese musician, singer and songwriter. In the anime Macross 7 he was the singing voice and guitar of the show's main character, Basara Nekki.

He joined the band JAM Project in 2003.
