= Mitsuko Horie =

Japanese actress and singer (born 1957)

- 堀江 美都子
- Born: Mitsuko Horie; March 8, 1957 (age 69); Yamato, Kanagawa, Japan
- Other name: Mitsuko Asami
- Education: Tsurumi University Junior and Senior High School
- Occupations: Actress; voice actress; singer
- Years active: 1969–present
- Agent: Aoni Production
- Height: 153 cm (5 ft 0 in)
- Spouse: Akio Asami (m. 1984)
- Children: 1
- Musical career
- Genres: Kayōkyoku; anison
- Instrument: Vocals
- Label: Nippon Columbia
- Website: www.micchi.net

Mitsuko Horie (Japanese: 堀江 美都子, Hepburn: Horie Mitsuko; born March 8, 1957) is a Japanese actress, voice actress and singer from Yamato, Kanagawa. She is known as the "Queen of the Anison World" (アニソン界の女王, Anison-kai no Joō).

Horie has voiced several characters throughout her career, such as Sailor Galaxia in Sailor Moon Sailor Stars and Remi in the Nippon Animation World Masterpiece Theater series Remi, Nobody's Girl. She is also part of the judging panel at the Animax Anison Grand Prix, with fellow singers Ichirou Mizuki, and Yumi Matsuzawa. As a voice actress, she is contracted to Aoni Production.

== Filmography ==
=== Anime ===
- Lalabel Tachibana in Lalabel, the Magical Girl (1980)
- Pollyanna Whittier in The Story of Pollyanna, Girl of Love (1986)
- Akko in Himitsu no Akko-chan (1988)
- Polaris Hilda in Saint Seiya (1986–1989)
- Beron in Kaizoku Sentai Gokaiger the Movie: The Flying Ghost Ship (2011)
- Remi in Remi, Nobody's Girl (1996–1997)
- Judy Abbott in My Daddy Long Legs (1990)
- Jeanie MacDowell in Jeanie with the Light Brown Hair (1992–1993)
- Monica in Porphy no Nagai Tabi (2008)
- Sailor Galaxia in Sailor Moon Sailor Stars (1996–1997)
- Narrator, Little Red Riding Hood, Princess (The Golden Goose), Rose-Red, Princess (The Water of Life), Kasia, Princess Rose Bud, Youngest Daughter (The Shoes that were Danced to Pieces), Cinderella, Princess (The Crystal Ball), Lily, Maria, Witch Daughter, Rapunzel, Servant Girl, Hildegard, Princess (The Six Swans), Princess (The Four Skillful Brothers), Princess (The Iron Stove), Cristina, Princess (Iron Hans), Wren Prince #2, Hunchman's Wife in Grimm's Fairy Tale Classics (1987–1989)
- Obotchaman in Dr. Slump Arale-Chan (1981–1986)
- Upa in Dragon Ball (1986–1989)
- Mitamura Yaeko "Yakko" in Love Me, My Knight (1983–1984)
- Miyuki Moriki in Submarine Super 99 (2003)
- Susumu Hori, Anna Hottenmeyer, and Puchi in the Mr. Driller series
- Wakaba in Pro Golfer Saru (1985-1988)
- Woodward in Little Witch Academia (TV) (2017)

=== Dubbing ===
- Private School (1984 Fuji TV edition), Christine Ramsey (Phoebe Cates)
- West Side Story (1990 TBS edition), Maria (Natalie Wood)

== Theme songs ==
=== Opening themes ===
- "Kurenai Sanshiro" Judo Boy (1969) (Her very first anime theme song; performed when she was only 12 years old)
- "Sazae-san" Sazae-san (1969) (Horie's song was used as the opening theme in 1975)
- "Akubi Musume" Hakushon Daimaou (2nd opening) (1969)
- "Mahou no Mako-chan" Mahō no Mako-chan (1970)
- "We Love You, We Love You!!! Witch Teacher" Majo Sensei (1971)
- "Midori no Hidamari" Yamanezumi Rocky Chuck (1973)
- "Kerokko Demetan" Kerokko Demetan (1973; also known as The Brave Frog)
- "Bokura Kyōdai Tentō Mushi" The Song of Tentomushi (1974)
- "Susume! Gorenger" with Isao Sasaki Himitsu Sentai Gorenger (1975–77)
- "Kum Kum's Song" Wanpaku Omukashi Kum Kum (1975)
- "La Seine no Hoshi" La Seine no Hoshi (1975)
- "Sinbad's Adventures" Arabian Nights: Sindbad no Boken (1975)
- "Watashi wa Candy" Candy Candy (1976)
- "Magne Robo Gakeen" with Ichirou Mizuki Magne Robo Gakeen (1976–77)
- "Tatakae! Ninja Captor!" with Ichirou Mizuki Ninja Captor (1976–1977)
- "Voltes V no Uta" Voltes V 1976–77
- "Little Lulu and Her Little Friends" "Little Lulu and Her Little Friends" (1976–1977)
- "Ashita e Attack!" Attack on Tomorrow (1977)
- "Yakukyou no Uta" Song of Baseball Enthusiasts (1977)
- "Majokko Tickle" Majokko Tickle (1978)
- Uchū Majin Daikengo (1978)
- "Hana no Ko Lunlun" Hana no Ko Lunlun (1979)
- "Hello Lalabel" Lalabel (1980)
- "Hello! Sandybell" Hello! Sandybell (1981)
- "Hashire! Jolie" Meiken Jolie (also known as Belle and Sebastian) (1981)
- "Dare ka Watashi wo Matte iru" The Wizard of Oz (1982)
- "Koi wa Totsuzen" Love Me, My Knight (1983)
- "The Fighter" Masked Warrior Lavithunder (1986, unreleased)
- "Cross Fight!" with Ichirou Mizuki Dangaioh (1987–89)
- "Himitsu no Akko-chan" Himitsu no Akko-chan (1st remake, 1988)
- Dagon in the Lands of Weeds (1988)
- "Yume no Hikouki" Wowser (TV Series) (1988-1989)
- "Growing Up" My Daddy Long Legs (1990)
- "Taiyō o Oikakete" Jeanie with the Light Brown Hair (1992)
- "Chō Ninja Tai Inazuma!! SPARK" Chō Ninja Tai Inazuma!! SPARK (2007)
- "New Moon ni Koishite" Sailor Moon Crystal (2016)

=== Ending themes ===
- "Akubi Musume" Hakushon Daimaou (1969)
- "Ran no Uta" Genshi Shonen Ryu (1971)
- "Kokoro no Uta" Wandering Sun (1971)
- "Makeru na Demetan" Kerokko Demetan (1973)
- "Rocky and Polly" Yamanezumi Rocky Chuck (1973)
- "Hiyoko de Shura" The Song of Tentomushi (1974)
- "Saurus-kun" Wanpaku Omukashi Kum Kum (1975)
- "Watashi wa Simone" La Seine no Hoshi (1975)
- "Sinbad's Song" Arabian Nights: Sinbad no Boken (1975)
- "Ashita ga Suki" Candy Candy (1976)
- "Kawa no Uta" Huckleberry no Bouken (1976)
- Chojin Sentai Baratack (1977)
- "Volleyball ga suki" Attack on Tomorrow (1977)
- "Yuuki no Theme" Song of Baseball Enthusiasts (1977)
- "I'm Lulu!" "Little Lulu and Her Little Friends" (1976–1977)
- "Tickle and Tiko's Cha-Cha-Cha" Majokko Tickle (1978)
- "Aozora-tte Iina" Doraemon (1979–2005) (Ending #7)
- "Mahou Shoujo Lalabel" Mahou Shoujo Lalabelle (1980)
- "Shiroi Suisen" Hello! Sandybell (1981)
- "Futari de Hanbunko" Meiken Jolie (1981)
- "Anata ni Shinjitsuichiro" Dr. Slump (1986)
- "Winner – Shōri-sha" Masked Warrior Lavithunder (1986, unreleased)
- "Kokoro no Honesty" Dangaioh (1987–89)
- "DON'T YOU" Himitsu no Akko-chan (1988)
- "Kimi no Kaze" My Daddy Long Legs (1990)
- "Omoide no Kagami" Jeanie with the Light Brown Hair (1992)
- "Egao no Loop" Jewelpet (2009)

=== Insert songs ===
- "Daltanius no Uta" (for Daltanius 1979–80)
- "Koi no Hana Uranai" Hana no Ko Lunlun (1979)
- "Lilac no Hanakotoba" Hana no Ko Lunlun (1979)
- "My Beautiful Town" Mahou Shoujo Lalabelle (1980)

"Ashiato March"
"Fukafuka Jolie" (with "Tadashi")
"Jolie no Uta"
"Rena ga Suki"
"Shuppatsu no Uta"

- "Ichi Tasu Ichi wa Nani?" The Wizard of Oz (1982)
- "Athena no Komoriuta ~Lullaby~" (for Saint Seiya 1988)
- "Time" with Hironobu Kageyama (for Saint Seiya 1988)
- "Kimiga Irukara" with Koorogi '73 (for Doraemon: The Record of Nobita's Parallel Visit to the West 1988)
- "Shine On ~Eien no Yume~" (for Saint Seiya 1990)
- "Golden Queen Galaxia" (Character song for Sailor Moon Sailor Stars 1996)
- "Susume! Driller!" (for Mr. Driller G 2001)
- "Suna to Shi no Ballad" (for Desert Punk 2005)
- "Bat Phoenix" (for Batman Ninja vs. Yakuza League 2025)

== Discography ==
=== Original albums ===
- EMOTION (1980)
- IMAGE (1981)
- Ready MADONNA (1982)
- Weekend (1983)
- Sunao ni nare Nakute (1983)
- Live in Egg-man (1985)
- IN MY HEART (1986)
- SING IT! (1986)

=== Best albums ===
- TV Shudaika Hit Album Mitsuko Horie to Tomi ni (1971)
- Mitsuko Horie: TV Animation no Sekai (1977)
- Mitsuko Horie: Anime Roman no Sekai (1978)
- Mitsuko Horie Best 24 (1978)
- Mitsuko Horie New Hit Best 16 (1979)
- Micchi no Heya (1980)
- Mitsuko Horie: Anime Best Hit (1981)
- Anime Heroine : Mitsuko Horie Action Anime wo Utau (1982)
- Mitsuko Horie Original Best 12 (1984)
- Debut (1989)
- Mitsuko Horie 20th Anniversary Recital Vol. 1-2 (1989)
- Mitsuko Horie Original Best Album (1993)
- Mitsuko Horie: Best & Best (1995)
- Mitsuko Horie: Heartful Concert (1996)
- Kaiki Kottou Ongaku-bako (1997)
- Mitsuko Horie 30th Anniversary: MICCHI 100% ~Ashita ga Suki~ (1999)
- Kokoro no Uta~Iyashi no Uta goe~ Mitsuko Horie Best (2004)
- Mitsuko Horie 40th Anniversary (2009)
  - Best
  - Micchi no Hitorigoto Club
  - Encore
- Mitsuko Horie Rare Groove Tracks (2014)
- Best of Best: Mitsuko Horie (2015)
- Heisei no Mitsuko Horie (2019)
- Mitsuko Horie 50th Anniversary Best Album: One Girl BEST (2020)
