= List of Cat's Eye chapters =

Cat's Eye (キャッツ♥アイ, Kyattsu Ai; stylized as CAT'S♥EYE) is a Japanese manga series written and illustrated by Tsukasa Hojo. The story follows the adventures of the three Kisugi sisters, Hitomi, Rui and Ai, who are art thieves trying to collect all the works belonging to their missing father. It was serialized in Weekly Shōnen Jump from 1981 to 1985, and collected into 18 tankōbon by Shueisha. The series has been reprinted in several editions.

== Jump Comics ==
No.	Title	Japanese release date	Japanese ISBN
01	Sexy Dynamite Gals; Sekushī Dainamaito Gyaruzu no Maki (セクシーダイナマイトギャルズの巻)	April 1982	4-08-851451-3
Chapter 1: "Sexy Dynamite Gals"; Chapter 2: "Skyscraper Tightrope"; Chapter 3: "A Tricky Love Affair"; Chapter 4: "Do You Like Blondes?"; Chapter 5: "Vol de Nuit is a Dangerous Fragrance"; Chapter 6: "Kittens to Spare"
02	Dad's Self-Portrait; Chichi no Shōzōga no Maki (父の肖像画の巻)	August 1982	4-08-851452-1
Chapter 7: "Enter the Gentleman Thief"; Chapter 8: "The Pesky Rat"; Chapter 9: "Memories of Dad"; Chapter 10: "I Love Hitomi"; Chapter 11: "The Cat's Helping Hand!"; Chapter 12: "Phantom of the Cat"; Chapter 13: "Dad's Self-Portrait"; Chapter 14: "Get the Goddess of Mars"
03	The Swooping Hawk! Taka wa Maiorita no Maki (鷹はまいおりたの巻)	November 1982	4-08-851453-X
Chapter 15: "The Swooping Hawk!"; Chapter 16: "Dog Crisis!!"; Chapter 17: "Armor Dog vs. Ai"; Chapter 18: "Cat's Eye Is a Woman"; Chapter 19: "I Wish We Could Stay Like This"; Chapter 20: "Ten Minutes, On the Dot"; Chapter 21: "Stumped and Stubborn"; Chapter 22: "Hands Off My Diary!"
04	Little Hurricane; Little Hurricane no Maki (Little Hurricane の巻)	March 1983	4-08-851454-8
Chapter 23: "Two Asatanis"; Chapter 24: "Visitor in the Snow"; Chapter 25: "Little Hurricane"; Chapter 26: "Burglary 101"; Chapter 27: "Back to Back"; Chapter 28: "Lost Memories"; Chapter 29: "The ABCs of Burglary"; Chapter 30: "Everyone Has Their Habits"; Chapter 31: "Follow the Fingerprints!"
05	Love Triangle with Cat's Eye! Kyattsu ga Koi ga Taki! no Maki (キャッツが恋がたき！の巻)	June 1983	4-08-851455-6
Chapter 32: "The Detective Bit the Cat!"; Chapter 33: "The Loose Cannon"; Chapter 34: "Ghost Cat"; Chapter 35: "Kung-Fu Cop"; Chapter 36: "Magic Hand"; Chapter 37: "Triple Crash!"; Chapter 38: "Love Triangle with Cat's Eye!"; Chapter 39: "The Trouble With Detectives!"; Chapter 40: "Countdown of Love"
06	The Red Love Letter; Akai Rabu Retā no Maki (赤いラブレターの巻)	August 1983	4-08-851456-4
Chapter 41: "My Bodyguard"; Chapter 42: "After the Rainfall"; Chapter 43: "Ai's at an Impressionable Age"; Chapter 44: "The Red Love Letter"; Chapter 45: "Love Letter from Cat's Eye"; Chapter 46: "A Dangerous Witness"; Chapter 47: "Get the Scoop!"; Chapter 48: "The Annoying Imp"; Chapter 49: "Nothing Ventured..."
07	Last Shot! Rasuto Shotto! no Maki (ラストショット！の巻)	October 1983	4-08-851457-2
Chapter 50: "In the Arms of the Wind"; Chapter 51: "Last Shot!"; Chapter 52: "Pretend We're a Couple"; Chapter 53: "Heartbreak?"; Chapter 54: "The Magnificent Getaway"; Chapter 55: "A Dreamy Messenger"; Chapter 56: "Dying Souls"; Chapter 57: "The Best Date Ever"
08	Super Gambler; Sūpā Gyanburā no Maki (スーパーギャンブラーの巻)	January 1984	4-08-851458-0
Chapter 58: "Super Gambler"; Chapter 59: "It's Your Happy Day"; Chapter 60: "Don't Leave, My Love"; Chapter 61: "Look Out for Lousy Women"; Chapter 62: "Tanker Jacking"
09	The Legend of the Snow Queen; Yuki Onna Densetsu no Maki (雪女伝説の巻)	April 1984	4-08-851459-9
Chapter 63: "Ai's Merry Christmas"; Chapter 64: "The New Year's Ball"; Chapter 65: "Throwing a Pie at a Wedding..."; Chapter 66: "The Legend of the Snow Queen"
10	An Invitation From Runan Island; Hanare Nantō Kara no Shōtaijō no Maki (離南島からの招待状の巻)	July 1984	4-08-851459-9
Chapter 67: "An Invitation From Runan Island"; Chapter 68: "The Sweet Life"; Chapter 69: "Baking Crooks the Cat Way"
11	One-Man Proposal; Wan Man Puropōzu no Maki (ワンマン・プロポーズの巻)	October 1984	4-08-851460-2
Chapter 70: "Miniskirts in Full Bloom"; Chapter 71: "Formation of the Cat's Eye Special Unit!!"; Chapter 72: "Mischief is Such Sweet Sorrow"; Chapter 73: "The Special Unit's Fighting Spirit"; Chapter 74: "A Man's Vow"; Chapter 75: "Whose Is That Engagement Ring Anyway?"; Chapter 76: "Love-Crazed Men's Quarters"; Chapter 77: "One-Man Proposal"; Chapter 78: "The Forgotten Proposal"
12	Blondie; Burondī no Maki (ブロンディーの巻)	January 1985	4-08-851461-0
Chapter 79: "Put the Ring On!"; Chapter 80: "A Dangerous Third Love!"; Chapter 81: "Cross-Counter for Love"; Chapter 82: "Blondie"; Chapter 83: "Take Me Forever!"; Chapter 84: "Hanky-Panky Verboten!"; Chapter 85: "A Fiancé from the Past"
13	A Dangerous Proposition; Kikenna Mayoi no Maki (危険な迷いの巻)	February 1985	4-08-851462-9
Chapter 86: "Bad Dream on a Summer's Night"; Chapter 87: "A Dangerous Proposition"; Chapter 88: "September Daydream"; Chapter 89: "Cassette Letter"; Chapter 90: "I Love You"; Chapter 91: "Not a Kid!"; Chapter 92: "A Three Billion Yen Morsel"; Chapter 93: "A Little Bird That Can't Fly"; Chapter 94: "A Heavy Trigger"
14	Burn the Past; Kako o Moyashite no Maki (過去を燃やしての巻)	March 1985	4-08-851463-7
Chapter 95: "Burn the Past"; Chapter 96: "The Right to be a Lover"; Chapter 97: "Kisses In the Dark!!"; Chapter 98: "A Love That Transcends Time"; Chapter 99: "Teacher Panic!"; Chapter 100: "Rui's Lover"; Chapter 101: "Love Montage"; Chapter 102: "A Passionate Kiss"; Chapter 103: "A Cop's Business Suit"; Chapter 104: "A Courageous Decision"
15	A Very Long Day; Nagai Tsuitachi… no Maki (長い一日…の巻)	April 1985	4-08-851464-5
Chapter 105: "A Fabulous Fib"; Chapter 106: "So You Say He's Sexy!?"; Chapter 107: "That's Your Head of Household?"; Chapter 108: "Three Men Together Add Up to One"; Chapter 109: "Panties Are Scary!!"; Chapter 110: "For Someone's Sake..."; Chapter 111: "My Most Important Girl!"; Chapter 112: "Throwing Down the Gauntlet!"; Chapter 113: "Bride Jacking"; Chapter 114: "A Very Long Day"
16	The Secret Behind Advance Notice; Yokokujō no Himitsu no Maki (予告状の秘密の巻)	May 1985	4-08-851465-3
Chapter 115: "Twisted Time!"; Chapter 116: "Cleaning Up After Toshio"; Chapter 117: "Temptation In The Dark!"; Chapter 118: "The Rat Goes Berserk Again..."; Chapter 119: "To Bell the Cat!"; Chapter 120: "Bento Box Switch!"; Chapter 121: "The Secret Behind Advance Notice"; Chapter 122: "The Setting Sun and Cat's Eye"
17	Aphrodite Awakens; Afurodīte no Mezame no Maki (アフロディーテのめざめの巻)	June 1985	4-08-851466-1
Chapter 123: "Deja Vu On the Wind"; Chapter 124: "The Painting Vanishes in a Puff of Smoke"; Chapter 125: "Sweet Whispers"; Chapter 126: "Cat Caught in a Trap"; Chapter 127: "You Must Only Have Eyes for Me!"; Chapter 128: "Aphrodite Awakens"; Chapter 129: "The Sneering Goddess"; Chapter 130: "Tears Dancing On the Wind"; Chapter 131: "A Caller from the Past"
18	The Tie That Binds... Forever! Kizuna yo Eien ni! no Maki (絆よ永遠に！の巻)	July 1985	4-08-851467-X
Chapter 132: "The Most Dangerous Game"; Chapter 133: "The Last Big Game"; Chapter 134: "The Tie That Binds... Forever!"; Chapter 135: "Love All Over Again"

== Aizouban ==
No.	Japanese release date	Japanese ISBN
01	January 1994	4-08-782621-X
02	February 1994	4-08-782622-8
03	March 1994	4-08-782623-6
04	April 1994	4-08-782624-4
05	May 1994	4-08-782625-2
06	June 1994	4-08-782626-0
07	July 1994	4-08-782627-9
08	August 1994	4-08-782628-7
09	September 1994	4-08-782629-5
10	October 1994	4-08-782630-9

== Bunkoban ==
No.	Japanese release date	Japanese ISBN
01	November 1995	4-08-617151-1
02	November 1995	4-08-617152-X
03	January 1996	4-08-617153-8
04	January 1996	4-08-617154-6
05	February 1996	4-08-617155-4
06	February 1996	4-08-617156-2
07	March 1996	4-08-617157-0
08	March 1996	4-08-617158-9
09	April 1996	4-08-617159-7
10	April 1996	4-08-617160-0

== Complete ==
No.	Japanese release date	Japanese ISBN
01	October 15, 2005	4-19-780317-6
02	October 15, 2005	4-19-780318-4
03	November 15, 2005	4-19-780322-2
04	November 15, 2005	4-19-780323-0
05	December 15, 2005	4-19-780324-9
06	January 14, 2006	4-19-780326-5
07	February 15, 2006	4-19-780328-1
08	March 15, 2006	4-19-780330-3
09	March 15, 2006	4-19-780331-1
10	April 15, 2006	4-19-780333-8
11	April 15, 2006	4-19-780334-6
12	May 15, 2006	4-19-780338-9
13	May 15, 2006	4-19-780339-7
14	June 15, 2006	4-19-780342-7
15	June 15, 2006	4-19-780343-5
