= The Gentleman, the Cat, & the Tea Room =

Japanese manga series

- Second tankōbon volume cover

猫と紳士のティールーム (Neko to Shinshi no Tīrūmu)
- Genre: Slice of life
- Manga
- Written by: Molico Ross
- Published by: Coamix
- English publisher: NA: Abrams ComicArts
- Imprint: Zenon Comics
- Magazine: Monthly Comic Zenon
- Original run: August 25, 2022 – present
- Volumes: 5

The Gentleman, the Cat, & the Tea Room (猫と紳士のティールーム, Neko to Shinshi no Tīrūmu) is a Japanese manga series written and illustrated by Molico Ross. It began serialization in Coamix's seinen manga magazine Monthly Comic Zenon in August 2022.

== Synopsis ==
Set in a café, the series focuses on the interactions between the owner of the café Taki, his pet cat Keemun, and their guests. The café is located between two large buildings, and guests frequently visit after a difficult time at work. Taki, the owner of the café, is a timid man who has situational awareness of what his guests are going through, and offers them relief in the form of tea and some snacks. His cat Keemun also provides assistance.

== Publication ==
Written and illustrated by Molico Ross, The Gentleman, the Cat, and the Tea Room began serialization in Coamix's seinen manga magazine Monthly Comic Zenon on August 25, 2022. Its chapters have been collected in five tankōbon volumes as of August 2025.

In February 2026, Abrams ComicArts announced that they had licensed the series for English publication under their Kana imprint, with the first volume initially set to release in September later in the year.

No.	Original release date	Original ISBN	North American release date	North American ISBN
1	February 20, 2023	978-4-86720-477-1	November 3, 2026	978-1-41979-218-2
2	August 19, 2023	978-4-86720-532-7	April 6, 2027	978-1-41979-219-9
3	February 20, 2024	978-4-86720-617-1	July 6, 2027	978-1-41979-220-5
4	August 20, 2024	978-4-86720-678-2	—	—
5	August 20, 2025	978-4-86720-736-9	—	—

== Reception ==
The series was a prize winner in the "Next Impact Comic" category at the 2nd Rakuten Kobo E-book Manga Awards in 2024. The series won the grand prize in the same category the following year.
