= Tokyo Duel =

Japanese manga series

- First tankōbon volume cover

東京決闘環状戦 (Tokyo Kettō Kanjōsen)
- Genre: Action; Martial arts
- Manga
- Written by: Toshiaki Yamada
- Published by: Coamix
- English publisher: NA: Comikey
- Magazine: Web Comic Zenon
- Original run: August 14, 2020 – September 23, 2026
- Volumes: 22
- icon

Tokyo Duel (Japanese: 東京決闘環状戦, Hepburn: Tokyo Kettō Kanjōsen) is a Japanese manga series written and illustrated by Toshiaki Yamada. It was serialized on Coamix's Web Comic Zenon website from August 2020 to September 2026, with its chapters collected in 22 tankōbon volumes.

== Plot ==
After World War II, Tokyo became a land of violence. The "Tokyo Loop Line Duels" were established where champions of each railway station called Yojimbo fight to determine who rules their territory. The duels are discontinued for about fifty years until 2020 when a new railway station is built. The duels are restarted and Koinosuke Yasuda, the Yojimbo of the Kanda Station, is determined to protect his town.

== Publication ==
Written and illustrated by Toshiaki Yamada, Tokyo Duel was serialized on Coamix's Web Comic Zenon website from August 14, 2020, to September 23, 2026. Coamix collected its chapters into 22 tankōbon volumes, released from December 19, 2020, to November 20, 2026. The series is licensed digitally in English by Comikey.

The manga has also been licensed in France by Piccoma; in Spain by Editorial Hidra; and in Italy by Ishi Publishing.

=== Volumes ===
No.	Release date	ISBN
1	December 19, 2020	978-4-86720-231-9
2	March 18, 2021	978-4-86720-234-0
3	June 18, 2021	978-4-86720-244-9
4	September 18, 2021	978-4-86720-270-8
5	December 20, 2021	978-4-86720-288-3
6	March 19, 2022	978-4-86720-317-0
7	June 20, 2022	978-4-86720-393-4
8	September 20, 2022	978-4-86720-417-7
9	December 20, 2022	978-4-86720-449-8
10	March 20, 2023	978-4-86720-485-6
11	June 20, 2023	978-4-86720-518-1
12	November 20, 2023	978-4-86720-589-1
13	March 19, 2024	978-4-86720-630-0
14	June 20, 2024	978-4-86720-660-7
15	September 20, 2024	978-4-86720-688-1
16	December 20, 2024	978-4-86720-719-2
17	March 19, 2025	978-4-86720-751-2
18	July 18, 2025	978-4-86720-785-7
19	November 20, 2025	978-4-86720-837-3
20	March 19, 2026	978-4-86720-872-4
21	July 17, 2026	978-4-86720-907-3
22	November 20, 2026	978-4-86720-940-0
