= Tengen Hero Wars =

Japanese manga series

- First tankōbon volume cover

テンゲン英雄大戦 (Tengen Eiyū Taisen)
- Genre: Epic; Historical; Isekai
- Manga
- Written by: Yasu Hiromoto
- Illustrated by: Kubara Sakanoichi
- Published by: Coamix
- English publisher: NA: Titan Manga
- Imprint: Zenon Comics
- Magazine: Monthly Comic Zenon
- Original run: October 25, 2021 – December 25, 2025
- Volumes: 10

Tengen Hero Wars (Japanese: テンゲン英雄大戦, Hepburn: Tengen Eiyū Taisen) is a Japanese manga series written by Yasu Hiromoto and illustrated by Kubara Sakanoichi. It has been serialized in Coamix's Monthly Comic Zenon from October 2021 to December 2025, with its chapters collected in ten tankōbon volumes.

== Plot ==
Oda Nobunaga is a modern-day teen named after the famous warlord. He obsessively studies history, but is ridiculed for having no talent by his little sister Ichiko and his peers. One day, Ichiko suddenly gets pulled into a portal to the past and so does Nobunaga when he tries to save her. The unconscious Ichiko is quickly abducted by bandits for the mark on her hand that designates her as a Stranger. Nobunaga tries to rescue her but is too weak and unskilled and is quickly beaten up. He is rescued by Kondo Isami and taken to the compound of the warlord Oda Nobunaga, who explains that several people from history, usually famous warlords, are being pulled to his time and several are trying to conquer his land, leading the land to be ravaged by a multiway war. The marks on them designate them as Strangers and grant them special abilities. The teen Nobunaga has no mark and no special abilities, so the only thing he can contribute is his encyclopedic knowledge of the historical figures. Seeing this as useful, the warlord Nobunaga cuts a deal with him. If the teen helps defeat the rival warlords, the warlord will help rescue Ichiko.

== Publication ==
Written by Yasu Hiromoto and illustrated by Kubara Sakanoichi, Tengen Hero Wars was serialized in Coamix's Monthly Comic Zenon from October 25, 2021, to December 25, 2025. Coamix has collected its chapters into individual tankōbon volumes. Ten volumes were released from June 20, 2022, to March 19, 2026.

In July 2023, it was announced that Titan Manga had acquired the manga license for English release. In France, the manga is licensed by Mangetsu, and in Spain by Editorial Ivrea.

=== Volumes ===
No.	Original release date	Original ISBN	English release date	English ISBN
1	June 20, 2022	978-4-86720-395-8	March 12, 2024	978-1-78774-128-7
2	September 20, 2022	978-4-86720-418-4	June 4, 2024	978-1-78774-129-4
3	March 20, 2023	978-4-86720-483-2	February 24, 2026	978-1-78774-349-6
4	July 20, 2023	978-4-86720-526-6	—	—
5	March 19, 2024	978-4-86720-629-4	—	—
6	July 20, 2024	978-4-86720-667-6	—	—
7	November 20, 2024	978-4-86720-703-1	—	—
8	July 18, 2025	978-4-86720-781-9	—	—
9	November 20, 2025	978-4-86720-835-9	—	—
10	March 19, 2026	978-4-86720-869-4	—	—

== Reception ==
In a review of the first three volumes, Manga Sanctuary praised the manga, considers the mystery surrounding the hero to be one of the positive aspects of manga and style similar to Record of Ragnarok. rated the second volume 9 out of 10 and the third volume 8 out of 10, they likens its epic battles to the Kingdom series sees it as a great strength in manga and praised the characters of the story, adding: "Tengen Hero Wars also manages to keep us in suspense thanks to its multiple twists and turns. But where it is perhaps even more spectacular is the use of special skills which bring magic and very pleasant fights to follow." Writing for Planete BD, Faustine Lillaz said that the characters confusing and gave good score to the drawings, describing them as tidy, stylish and fluid. In the second volume and third volumes, she gave a very good score to the drawings, and called the battles "eye-catching."
