= Meshi Numa =

Japanese manga series

- First tankōbon volume cover

めしぬま
- Genre: Gourmet
- Manga
- Written by: Amidamuku
- Published by: Tokuma Shoten (1–6); Coamix
- Imprint: Zenon Comics
- Magazine: Monthly Comic Zenon
- Original run: January 25, 2016 – present
- Volumes: 16
- Original net animation
- Released: June 8, 2018

Meshi Numa (めしぬま) is a Japanese manga series written and illustrated by Amidamuku. It began serialization in Coamix's seinen manga magazine Monthly Comic Zenon in January 2016. An original net animation (ONA) adaptation aired on Production I.G's Anime Beans app in June 2018.

== Media ==
=== Manga ===
Written and illustrated by Amidamuku, Meshi Numa began serialization in Coamix's seinen manga magazine Monthly Comic Zenon on January 25, 2016. Its chapters have been collected in sixteen tankōbon volumes as of August 2026.

No.	Release date	ISBN
1	December 20, 2016	978-4-19-980385-7 (original); 978-4-86720-081-0 (reprint)
2	May 20, 2017	978-4-19-980414-4 (original); 978-4-86720-082-7 (reprint)
3	December 20, 2017	978-4-19-980467-0 (original); 978-4-86720-083-4 (reprint)
4	May 19, 2018	978-4-19-980494-6 (original); 978-4-86720-084-1 (reprint)
5	February 20, 2019	978-4-19-980551-6 (original); 978-4-86720-085-8 (reprint)
6	October 19, 2019	978-4-19-980600-1 (original); 978-4-86720-086-5 (reprint)
7	May 20, 2020	978-4-86720-150-3
8	December 19, 2020	978-4-86720-189-3
9	September 18, 2021	978-4-86720-266-1
10	February 19, 2022	978-4-86720-308-8
11	October 20, 2022	978-4-86720-428-3
12	June 20, 2023	978-4-86720-519-8
13	April 19, 2024	978-4-86720-638-6
14	March 19, 2025	978-4-86720-739-0
15	December 19, 2025	978-4-86720-850-2
16	August 20, 2026	978-4-86720-910-3

=== Anime ===
An original net animation (ONA) adaptation was announced in the fourth volume of the manga released on May 19, 2018. It was released on Production I.G's Anime Beans app on June 8, 2018.
