= A Side Character's Love Story =

Japanese manga series

- First tankōbon volume cover

モブ子の恋 (Mobuko no Koi)
- Genre: Romantic drama
- Manga
- Written by: Akane Tamura
- Published by: Tokuma Shoten (1–6); Coamix
- English publisher: Coamix
- Imprint: Zenon Comics
- Magazine: Monthly Comic Zenon; (March 26, 2017 – July 25, 2018); Comic Tatan; (August 19, 2018 – present)
- Original run: March 26, 2017 – present
- Volumes: 26
- Live-action film
- Directed by: Hiroki Kazama
- Written by: Yasuko Kuramitsu
- Music by: Hidekazu Sakamoto
- Studio: AOI Pro.
- Released: June 5, 2026
- Runtime: 122 minutes
- icon

A Side Character's Love Story (Japanese: モブ子の恋, Hepburn: Mobuko no Koi (Note: The Japanese title literally translates to "the love of Mobuko", where "Mobuko" is a nickname given to the main character by the author and used in recurring side notes that describe her quirks. It occurs within the story only in the very beginning as a mishearing of her real name. Nobuko herself then relates this to "mob" (モブ, mobu), the Japanese slang for non-player characters in video games. She consideres the comparison to be apt, reflecting her low self-confidence.)) is a Japanese manga series written and illustrated by Akane Tamura. It was initially serialized in Coamix's Monthly Comic Zenon magazine from March 2017 to July 2018. It was later transferred to the Comic Tatan website in August 2018. A live-action film adaptation premiered in Japanese theaters in June 2026.

== Plot ==
Nobuko Tanaka is a university student working part time in a supermarket, who has developed a crush on her co-worker Hiroki Irie. Unfortunately, her shy nature and tendency to second-guess and overthink everything she does, make pursuing her feelings a nearly unsurmountable challenge - especially since Hiroki's personality turns out to be quite similar. But with a little courage, luck, and support from the other co-workers, the two manage to begin a relationship.

== Characters ==
Nobuko Tanaka (田中信子, Tanaka Nobuko)
Portrayed by: Hiyori Sakurada
Hiroki Irie (入江博基, Irie Hiroki)
Portrayed by: Taisei Kido
Hina Abe (安部陽菜, Abe Hina)
Portrayed by: Ikoi Hayase
Sachi Shinozaki (篠崎幸, Shinozaki Sachi)
Portrayed by: Erika Karata
Yuya Kaneko (金子優也, Kaneko Yūya)
Portrayed by: Takuya Kusakawa
Yo Ohno (大野陽, Ōno Yō)
Portrayed by: Towa Araki
Tomonori Orihara (折原智則, Orihara Tomonori)
Portrayed by: Kanji Furutachi

== Media ==
=== Manga ===
Written and illustrated by Akane Tamura, A Side Character's Love Story initially was serialized in Coamix's Monthly Comic Zenon magazine from March 26, 2017, to July 25, 2018. It was later transferred to the Comic Tatan website on August 19, 2018. Its chapters have been collected into twenty-six tankōbon volumes as of September 2026.

The series' volumes are published digitally in English by Coamix. The series is also published in English on Azuki, Comikey and MangaPlaza.

No.	Original release date	Original ISBN	English release date	English ISBN
1	October 20, 2017	978-4-19-980451-9	February 11, 2020	—
2	February 20, 2018	978-4-19-980479-3	March 11, 2020	—
3	July 20, 2018	978-4-19-980505-9	April 7, 2020	—
4	January 19, 2019	978-4-19-980545-5	May 5, 2020	—
5	June 20, 2019	978-4-19-980575-2	September 15, 2020	—
6	November 20, 2019	978-4-19-980605-6	October 13, 2020	—
7	April 20, 2020	978-4-86-720093-3	November 10, 2020	—
8	September 19, 2020	978-4-86-720166-4	December 22, 2020	—
9	January 20, 2021	978-4-86-720195-4	April 5, 2022	—
10	May 20, 2021	978-4-86-720237-1	May 3, 2022	—
11	September 18, 2021	978-4-86-720265-4	June 21, 2022	—
12	January 20, 2022	978-4-86-720294-4	November 29, 2022	—
13	May 20, 2022	978-4-86-720380-4	January 24, 2023	—
14	September 20, 2022	978-4-86-720423-8	February 14, 2023	—
15	January 20, 2023	978-4-86-720461-0	May 2, 2023	—
16	May 19, 2023	978-4-86-720504-4	September 19, 2023	—
17	September 20, 2023	978-4-86-720566-2	February 14, 2024	—
18	January 19, 2024	978-4-86-720606-5	May 7, 2024	—
19	May 20, 2024	978-4-86-720647-8	September 10, 2024	—
20	September 20, 2024	978-4-86-720683-6	—	—
21	January 20, 2025	978-4-86-720729-1	—	—
22	May 20, 2025	978-4-86-720766-6	—	—
23	September 20, 2025	978-4-86-720803-8	—	—
24	January 20, 2026	978-4-86-720856-4	—	—
25	May 20, 2026	978-4-86-720896-0	—	—
26	September 18, 2026	978-4-86-720928-8	—	—

=== Live-action film ===
A live-action film adaptation was announced in the release of the series' 16th volume on May 19, 2023. The film will be directed by Hiroki Kazama. It was originally set to premiere in 2024, but was delayed to June 5, 2026, and was released by Aeon Entertainment and Tokyo Theatres. The film featured Hiyori Sakurada and Taisei Kido in lead roles. The film's theme song, "Clover", is performed by Nishina.
