= Unsung Cinderella =

Japanese manga series

- Unsung Cinderella: Byōin Yakuzaishi Aoi Midori
- First tankōbon volume cover

アンサングシンデレラ 病院薬剤師 葵みどり (Ansangu Shinderera: Byōin Yakuzaishi Aoi Midori)
- Genre: Medical drama
- Manga
- Written by: Mamare Arai
- Published by: Tokuma Shoten (1–3); Coamix
- Imprint: Zenon Comics
- Magazine: Monthly Comic Zenon
- Original run: May 25, 2018 – May 26, 2025
- Volumes: 15
- Television drama
- Directed by: Ryō Tanaka
- Produced by: Yūsuke Noda
- Written by: Tsutomu Kuroiwa
- Studio: Fuji Television
- Original network: FNS (Fuji TV)
- Original run: July 16, 2020 – September 24, 2020
- Episodes: 11

Unsung Cinderella: Byōin Yakuzaishi Aoi Midori (Japanese: アンサングシンデレラ 病院薬剤師 葵みどり, Hepburn: Ansangu Shinderera: Byōin Yakuzaishi Aoi Midori) is a Japanese manga series written and illustrated by Mamare Arai. It was serialized in Coamix's Monthly Comic Zenon magazine from May 2018 to May 2025. A live-action television drama adaptation aired from July to September 2020.

== Synopsis ==
Midori Aoi is a pharmacist who has worked on her strong belief throughout her eight-year career; she believes that in order to prescribe the right medicine, one must know the patient well, because medicine is the link that can connect one patient to another.

== Media ==
=== Manga ===
Written and illustrated by Mamare Arai, Unsung Cinderella: Byōin Yakuzaishi Aoi Midori was serialized in Coamix's Monthly Comic Zenon magazine from May 25, 2018, to May 26, 2025. Its chapters have been collected into fifteen tankōbon volumes as of July 2025.

No.	Release date	ISBN
1	November 20, 2018	978-4-19-980532-5 (original); 978-4-86-720016-2 (reprint)
2	April 20, 2019	978-4-19-980562-2 (original); 978-4-86-720017-9 (reprint)
3	September 20, 2019	978-4-19-980590-5 (original); 978-4-86-720018-6 (reprint)
4	April 20, 2020	978-4-86-720019-3
5	June 19, 2020	978-4-86-720153-4
6	March 18, 2021	978-4-86-720192-3
7	October 20, 2021	978-4-86-720271-5
8	April 20, 2022	978-4-86-720359-0
9	October 20, 2022	978-4-86-720429-0
10	April 20, 2023	978-4-86-720494-8
11	October 20, 2023	978-4-86-720573-0
12	April 19, 2024	978-4-86-720635-5
13	October 19, 2024	978-4-86-720696-6
14	April 18, 2025	978-4-86-720720-8
15	July 18, 2025	978-4-86-720784-0

=== Drama ===
A live-action television drama adaptation was announced on February 5, 2020. It was originally set to premiere on Fuji TV in April 2020, but was delayed to July 16 that same year due to the COVID-19 pandemic. The series starred Satomi Ishihara in the lead role, and Nanase Nishino and Kei Tanaka among others in supporting roles.
