= Angel Heart (manga) =

Japanese manga series

- Cover of the first tankōbon volume Bunch Comics edition, featuring Ryou Saeba (back) and Xiang Ying Li (front)

エンジェル・ハート (Enjeru Hāto)
- Manga
- Written by: Tsukasa Hojo
- Published by: Shinchosha
- Magazine: Weekly Comic Bunch
- Original run: May 15, 2001 – August 27, 2010
- Volumes: 33
- Anime television series
- Directed by: Toshiki Hirano
- Written by: Sumio Uetake
- Music by: Taku Iwasaki
- Studio: TMS Entertainment
- Licensed by: NA: Discotek Media
- Original network: YTV, NTV
- Original run: October 3, 2005 – September 25, 2006
- Episodes: 50
- Manga

Angel Heart: 2nd Season
- Written by: Tsukasa Hojo
- Published by: Tokuma Shoten
- Magazine: Monthly Comic Zenon
- Original run: October 25, 2010 – May 25, 2017
- Volumes: 16
- Television drama series
- Angel Heart (2015)

Angel Heart (Japanese: エンジェル・ハート, Hepburn: Enjeru Hāto) is a Japanese manga series written and illustrated by Tsukasa Hojo published in the Comic Bunch from 2001 throughout 2010. After Comic Bunch stopped being a print magazine and became an online magazine, the manga was transferred to Monthly Comic Zenon under the title of Angel Heart: 2nd Season, which ran from 2010 to 2017. An animated television series based on the manga aired in Japan from October 3, 2005, to September 25, 2006, while a live action TV drama was released in 2015.

The author mentioned in the first tankōbon volume that Angel Heart shares the same characters as City Hunter but is not its continuation.

== Plot ==
A young woman stands on top of a building in Shinjuku as she receives a call from her handler. The handler, who calls her "Glass Heart", congratulates her with a job well done regarding her latest kill, which he refers to as her 50th. Glass Heart recounts the day's events. She had just killed a man sitting on a park bench with a silenced gun. As she was leaving the park, a small girl runs in with some ice cream and Glass Heart realizes that she has just killed the father of a little girl. With that she jumps off the building, impaling her chest on the iron spiked fence below.

At the same time, Kaori Makimura is running late for an appointment to take wedding photos with her husband, the "City Hunter" Ryo Saeba. When she sees a girl about to be run over by a truck, she jumps and pushes the girl out of the way before the truck hits her. A short while later, she is declared brain dead and her heart is harvested for organ donation, as she had a donor card on her when she died. However, the Organization, needing a heart for their assassin, steals Kaori's heart while it is in transit and implants it into Glass Heart's body.

Glass Heart is transported to Taiwan, where she remains in a coma for a year. During that time, she is haunted by the images of the people she has killed, along with the images of the donor Kaori as well as Ryo Saeba of whom she does not know. She wakes up after one year to find out who these people are. She travels back to Shinjuku, and after several close events, manages to track down the "City Hunter". He has retired from his role since his wife's death. Upon finding that Glass Heart is the recipient of Kaori's heart, Ryo decides to adopt her as his daughter, and is also given a name provided by her real father: Xiang Ying. The former mercenary now tries to help the former assassin move on with a normal life in the outside world.

== Characters ==
The cast of Angel Heart

=== Main characters ===
Xiang Ying (香瑩, Japanese: Shan'in, Chinese Pinyin: Xiāng-Yíng)

Voiced by: Mao Kawasaki
Played by: Ayaka Miyoshi
A young Taiwanese girl who is the main protagonist of Angel Heart. In reality, she is the daughter of Li Jian-Qiang, the leader of the crime syndicate Zheng Dao Hui. However at the age of two, she and her mother were involved in a car accident when their car plunged off a cliff into a river. Her mother was killed in the accident but Xiang-Ying was never found, despite the best efforts of her father and his organization to locate her. In a cruel twist of fate, Xiang-Ying was found and taken in by the Zhuque Corps (a section of Zheng Dao Hui which specializes in assassinations) and trained to be an assassin. Because of the accident, she has no memory of her childhood, and as a result does not know her true parentage. While in training for the Zhuque Corps, she was referred to as Number 27 but after her training was complete, she was referred to as Glass Heart. After attempting to commit suicide, the heart of Kaori Makimura was transplanted into her, and with it, the overpowering desire to live and to be reunited with Ryo Saeba. As a result, she busts out of the lab she was kept in and travels to Japan where she finally meets Ryo. Ryo, in turn adopts Xiang-Ying as his daughter.
Ryo Saeba (冴羽 獠, Saeba Ryō)
Voiced by: Akira Kamiya
Played by: Takaya Kamikawa
Like Xiang-Ying, Ryo himself has no memory of his background, being the lone survivor of a plane crash that killed his parents, and raised to be a mercenary. During his time as City Hunter, he was praised as one of the best in the underworld, while being a lecherous skirt chaser. However, he had come to a point where he decided to settle down and take Kaori as his wife. He was with Kaori in her last moments after she was hit by a truck, begging her to live.
At the beginning of the story, Ryo Saeba is a grieved man. He has since closed down his business as City Hunter. To deal with the loss of his fiancée Kaori, he has resorted to his former ways of skirt chasing, while his friends Saeko and Umibozu know that he is doing this to hide his pain. The arrival of Xiang-Ying in his life gives him some form of closure as well as something to live for as he tries to raise someone who he considers to be his and Kaori's daughter.
Kaori Makimura (槇村 香, Makimura Kaori)
Voiced by: Kazue Ikura
Played by: Saki Aibu
In this alternate story, Kaori is hit by a truck while trying to save a young girl while on her way to take wedding pictures with Ryo. Her heart was harvested for use in another recipient before it was intercepted by the Zheng Dao Hui for use in Glass Heart after her attempted suicide. Her age at her time of death is listed as 28.
Like Xiang-Ying and Ryo, Kaori also does not know her true parentage, being the daughter of a criminal who died in a police incident and later being adopted by the Makimura family. Kaori somehow knows that she is not related to the family who raised her. When she was younger, she would wait at Shinjuku station every day for her father (who had died) to come through the turnstiles, believing that he would come, before her brother would arrive to pick her up.
Although she may be dead, Xiang-Ying can feel Kaori's thoughts inside of her and Kaori can also communicate to Ryo through Xiang-Ying.
Umibozu (海坊主)
Voiced by: Tessho Genda
Played by: Brother Tom
Umibozu is owner of the Cat's Eye cafe. Umibozu is blind, but his blindness has not affected his abilities. He even admits that due to his blindness, he can "see" certain things that people with normal sight cannot see, such as recognizing people before they come into his cafe. Umibozu considers Ryo as his friend as evidenced by his concern for Ryo's mental health. Umibozu is also known by the codename Falcon.
Saeko Nogami (野上 冴子, Nogami Saeko)
Voiced by: Yoko Asagami
Played by: Reiko Takashima
Saeko is Superintendent of the Shinjuku district police department.
Liu Xin-Hong (劉 信宏)
Voiced by: Chihiro Suzuki
Played by: Shohei Miura, Lin Yi
Xin-Hong is a childhood friend of Xiang-Ying and was referred to as Number 36 during training for the Zhuque Corps. He has developed feelings of affection for Xiang-Ying, and as a result, the trainers had Xiang-Ying and Xin-Hong face off in a fight to the death in the final exam. Xiang-Ying managed to get the drop on Xin-Hong and reluctantly killed her only friend, or so she thought. Somehow, he survived, and was transferred to the Qinglong Corps, another branch of Zheng Dao Hui. In fact, throughout this time, Xin-Hong has kept his desire to reunite himself with Xiang-Ying as his motivating factor to live. After the Qinglong were killed off by the Xuanwe, he was allowed by Li Jian-Qiang to live a normal life in order to watch over Xiang-Ying.

== Media ==
=== Manga ===
The series debuted on May 15, 2001, in the first issue of Weekly Comic Bunch. The story developed from a short story by Hojo called The Eyes of the Assassin. The basic script took five years to create. The series was published in 33 volumes from October 2001 until October 2010. A republished edition, titled Angel Heart: 1st Season, was published by Tokuma Shoten between March 19, 2012, and February 20, 2013, consisting of 24 volumes.

Due to the discontinuation of Weekly Comic Bunch in 2010 the series was moved to Monthly Comic Zenon under a new title, Angel Heart: 2nd Season. 2nd Season was serialized from the December 2010 issue up until July 2017, lasting 16 collected volumes.

In 2016, an English version of the manga started being serialized online via the official SMAC website, but only 13 chapters were published before SMAC stopped publishing new chapters.

=== Anime ===
An animated television series based on Angel Heart was developed as a co-production between TMS Entertainment (the producers of the Cat's Eye anime), Yomiuri Telecasting Corporation, and Aniplex. Fifty episodes were broadcast between October 4, 2005, and September 26, 2006.

On January 20, 2025, Discotek Media announced that they licensed Angel Heart anime series for a North American Blu-ray release.

=== Live action ===
Angel Heart was adapted into a live action TV drama starring Ayaka Miyoshi as Xiang-Ying and Takaya Kamikawa as Ryo Saeba. Yuuya Takahashi has written the scripts and Shunsuke Kariyama is directing the series. The series began airing on October 11, 2015, on Nippon TV with a 12.5% audience share. It was streamed by Crunchyroll.

== Reception ==
The series has sold 25 million copies.
