= Trace (manga) =

Japanese manga series

- First tankōbon volume cover

トレース 科捜研法医研究員の追想 (Torēsu Kasōken Hōi Kenkyūin no Tsuisō)
- Genre: Crime, suspense
- Manga
- Written by: Kei Koga
- Published by: Tokuma Shoten; Coamix
- Imprint: Zenon Comics
- Magazine: Monthly Comic Zenon
- Original run: January 25, 2016 – February 25, 2023
- Volumes: 13
- Television drama

Trace: Kasōken no Otoko
- Directed by: Hiroaki Matsuyama; Hideyuki Aizawa; Toshiyuki Mihashi
- Produced by: Daisuke Kusagaya; Rie Kumagai
- Written by: Tomoko Aizawa
- Music by: Ken Arai
- Studio: Fuji Television
- Original network: FNS (Fuji TV)
- Original run: January 7, 2019 – March 18, 2019
- Episodes: 11
- Manga

Brutal
- Written by: Kei Koga
- Illustrated by: Ryō Izawa
- Published by: Takeshobo; Coamix
- Imprint: Zenon Comics Tatan
- Magazine: Comic Tatan
- Original run: June 28, 2019 – present
- Volumes: 5

Trace (トレース 科捜研法医研究員の追想, Torēsu Kasōken Hōi Kenkyūin no Tsuisō) is a Japanese manga series written and illustrated by Kei Koga. It was serialized in Coamix's Monthly Comic Zenon magazine from January 2016 to February 2023. An 11-episode live-action television drama adaptation aired from January to March 2019.

== Plot ==
Twenty-three years ago, Reiji, an elementary school student, returned home from school to discover his family brutally murdered and their bodies mutilated. At the funeral, Reiji tearfully vowed to uncover the truth behind the incident and bring justice to those responsible.

Reiji, now known as Reiji Mano, is a forensic researcher in the forensic medicine department of the Tokyo Metropolitan Police Department's Forensic Science Laboratory. Those around him, including the new forensic researcher Nonna Sawaguchi, appear to be unaware of his true identity, and although Mano often clashes with investigators due to differences in opinion, he is recognized as the ace of the forensic science laboratory. However, even after 23 years, Mano has still not been able to uncover the true culprit of the case.

One day, Detective Ryohei Toramaru of the Shinjuku Police Station brings a case to the forensic science laboratory for analysis. It turns out that 23 years ago, Toramaru, who was working at a local police box at the time, was the first to arrive at the scene of the Mano family murder case. While wary of Toramaru, Mano prepares to bring the evil to justice.

== Media ==
=== Manga ===
Written and illustrated by Kei Koga, Trace was serialized in Coamix's Monthly Comic Zenon magazine from January 25, 2016, to February 25, 2023. Its chapters were collected into thirteen tankōbon volumes released from July 20, 2016, to April 20, 2023.

The series' chapters are published in English on Coamix's MangaHot service.

A spin-off manga written by Koga and illustrated by Ryō Izawa titled Brutal (ブルータル 殺人警察官の告白, Burūtaru Satsujin Keisatsukan no Kokuhaku) began serialization on Coamix's Comic Tatan website on June 28, 2019. Its chapters have been collected into five tankōbon volumes as of May 20, 2022.

The spin-off's chapters are also published in English on Coamix's MangaHot service.

==== Volumes ====
No.	Release date	ISBN
1	July 20, 2016	978-4-19-980356-7 (original); 978-4-86720-070-4 (reprint)
2	February 20, 2017	978-4-19-980394-9 (original); 978-4-86720-071-1 (reprint)
3	September 20, 2017	978-4-19-980445-8 (original); 978-4-86720-072-8 (reprint)
4	March 20, 2018	978-4-19-980483-0 (original); 978-4-86720-073-5 (reprint)
5	September 20, 2018	978-4-19-980516-5 (original); 978-4-86720-074-2 (reprint)
6	January 19, 2019	978-4-19-980547-9 (original); 978-4-86720-075-9 (reprint)
7	June 20, 2019	978-4-19-980572-1 (original); 978-4-86720-076-6 (reprint)
8	November 20, 2019	978-4-19-980606-3 (original); 978-4-86720-077-3 (reprint)
9	June 19, 2020	978-4-86720-154-1
10	June 18, 2021	978-4-86720-241-8
11	May 20, 2022	978-4-86720-378-1
12	November 18, 2022	978-4-86720-442-9
13	April 20, 2023	978-4-86720-495-5

==== Brutal ====
No.	Release date	ISBN
1	November 20, 2019	978-4-80-196800-4 (original); 978-4-86720-333-0 (reprint)
2	June 19, 2020	978-4-80-196996-4 (original); 978-4-86720-334-7 (reprint)
3	December 19, 2020	978-4-80-197167-7 (original); 978-4-86720-335-4 (reprint)
4	July 19, 2021	978-4-80-197388-6 (original); 978-4-86720-336-1 (reprint)
5	May 20, 2022	978-4-86720-386-6

=== Drama ===
An 11-episode live-action television drama adaptation, titled Trace: Kasōken no Otoko, aired on Fuji TV from January 7 to March 18, 2019. The drama featured performances from Eiichiro Funakoshi, Ryo Nishikido, Yuko Araki, Shigenori Yamazaki, Kasumi Yamaya, and Koyuki.

== Reception ==
The Brutal spin-off manga was ranked fifteenth in Honya Club's "Nationwide Bookstore Employees' Recommended Comics of 2022".
