= Battlefront of the Great Powers =

Japanese manga series

- First tankōbon volume cover

列強戦線 (Rekkyō Sensen)
- Genre: Science fiction
- Manga
- Written by: Natsuko Uruma
- Published by: Coamix
- English publisher: NA: Yen Press
- Imprint: Zenon Comics
- Magazine: Monthly Comic Zenon
- Original run: October 25, 2023 – present
- Volumes: 8

Battlefront of the Great Powers (列強戦線, Rekkyō Sensen), also known as The Doomsday Is Wartime, is a Japanese manga series written and illustrated by Natsuko Uruma. It began serialization in Coamix's seinen manga magazine Monthly Comic Zenon in October 2023.

== Plot ==
In the year 2206, pollution and resource shortages leave society on the brink of collapse. Sixteen nations hold a tournament where genetically altered teenagers with super powers will fight to the death. Losing results in the contestant's homeland being immediately destroyed.

== Publication ==
Written and illustrated by Natsuko Uruma, Battlefront of the Great Powers began serialization in Coamix's seinen manga magazine Monthly Comic Zenon on October 25, 2023. Its chapters have been compiled into eight tankōbon volumes as of August 2026.

During their panel at Anime NYC 2025, Yen Press announced that they had licensed the series for English publication.

No.	Original release date	Original ISBN	English release date	English ISBN
1	July 20, 2024	978-4-86720-625-6	March 24, 2026	979-8-8554-1647-3
2	July 20, 2024	978-4-86720-664-5	November 24, 2026	979-8-8554-1651-0
3	November 20, 2024	978-4-86720-702-4	—	—
4	March 19, 2025	978-4-86720-750-5	—	—
5	July 18, 2025	978-4-86720-779-6	—	—
6	November 20, 2025	978-4-86720-834-2	—	—
7	March 19, 2026	978-4-86720-867-0	—	—
8	August 20, 2026	978-4-86720-921-9	—	—
