= A Tail's Tale =

Japanese manga series

- First tankōbon volume cover

尾かしら付き。 (Okashiratsuki)
- Genre: Romance
- Manga
- Written by: Mizu Sahara
- Published by: Tokuma Shoten (1–3); Coamix
- English publisher: NA: Tokyopop
- Imprint: Zenon Comics
- Magazine: Monthly Comic Zenon
- Original run: March 24, 2018 – May 25, 2021
- Volumes: 4
- Live-action film
- Directed by: Mikiya Sanada
- Written by: Satoko Okazaki
- Music by: Hilcrhyme
- Studio: Movie Walker
- Released: August 18, 2023

A Tail's Tale (尾かしら付き。, Okashiratsuki) is a Japanese manga series written and illustrated by Mizu Sahara. It was serialized in Coamix's Monthly Comic Zenon manga magazine from March 2018 to May 2021. A live-action film adaptation premiered in Japanese theaters in August 2023.

== Synopsis ==
Nachi is a member of the softball club, however, unlike the other students at her school, she is less prone to sunburn due to her pale skin, which makes her stand out. Her classmates consider her a strange and unbearable girl because she refuses to be approached by popular boys. The story begins to unfold when she suddenly becomes interested in a mysterious boy named Utsumi at her swimming class.

== Media ==
=== Manga ===
Written and illustrated by Mizu Sahara, A Tail's Tale was serialized in Coamix's Monthly Comic Zenon manga magazine from March 24, 2018, to May 25, 2021. Its chapters were compiled into four tankōbon volumes released from November 20, 2018, to July 19, 2021. The series is licensed in English by Tokyopop.

No.	Original release date	Original ISBN	North American release date	North American ISBN
1	November 20, 2018	978-4-19-980531-8 (original); 978-4-86720-145-9 (reprint)	November 5, 2024	978-1-42-787833-5
1. "An Encounter with the Unknown"; 2. "Extremely Fleeting"; 3. "Can't Catch a Break"; 4. "What Kind of Face Is That?"; 5. "Error"; 6. "The Tail that Vanished"
2	June 20, 2019	978-4-19-980576-9 (original); 978-4-86720-146-6 (reprint)	March 11, 2025	978-1-42-788047-5
7. "Weirdo"; 8. "Setback"; 9. "Coward"; 10. "Self-Loathing"; 11. "Treasure"; 12. "The Strongest"
3	January 20, 2020	978-4-19-980613-1 (original); 978-4-86720-147-3 (reprint)	May 20, 2025	978-1-42-788074-1
13. "Tyrant"; 14. "Wonderful Daughters"; 15. "Nachi's Cheek Pouches"; 16. "Not Sorry"; 17. "The Last Mushrooms"; 18. "Sweet, Bitter, and Salty"
4	July 19, 2021	978-4-86720-248-7	July 22, 2025	978-1-42-788075-8
19. "Like Father, Like Son"; 20. "Perfectly Imperfect"; 21. "Even"; 22. "Vacuum Cleaner"; 23. "Rival"; 24. "Inheritance"

=== Live-action film ===
A live-action film adaptation was announced on March 26, 2023. The film was directed by Mikiya Sanada, with music composed by Hilcrhyme, starred Eito Konishi and Ayaka Ohira in the lead roles, and featured Rina Takeda and Subaru Kimura among others in supporting roles. The film premiered in Japanese theaters on August 18, 2023.
