= Gals Can't Be Kind to Otaku!? =

Japanese manga series and its adaptation(s)

- First tankōbon volume cover, featuring Kei Amane

オタクに優しいギャルはいない！？ (Otaku ni Yasashii Gyaru wa Inai!?)
- Genre: Romantic comedy
- Manga
- Written by: Norishiro-chan
- Illustrated by: Sakana Uozumi
- Published by: Coamix
- English publisher: NA: Yen Press
- Imprint: Zenon Comics
- Magazine: Monthly Comic Zenon
- Original run: August 25, 2021 – present
- Volumes: 13
- Anime television series
- Directed by: Shin Mita
- Written by: Kazuhiko Inukai
- Music by: Kō Satō
- Studio: TMS Entertainment
- Licensed by: Crunchyroll
- Original network: ANN (TV Asahi), BS Asahi
- Original run: April 8, 2026 – June 24, 2026
- Episodes: 12
- icon

Gals Can't Be Kind to Otaku!? (Japanese: オタクに優しいギャルはいない！？, Hepburn: Otaku ni Yasashii Gyaru wa Inai!?), also known as OtaGal (オタギャル, Otagyaru), is a Japanese manga series written by Norishiro-chan and illustrated by Sakana Uozumi. It began serialization in Coamix's seinen manga magazine Monthly Comic Zenon in August 2021. An anime television series adaptation produced by TMS Entertainment aired from April to June 2026.

== Plot ==
Takuya Seo, a loner student, is a fan of an anime series targeted towards young girls, but is embarrassed about others finding out. He sits behind two gyaru classmates, Kotoko Ichiji and Kei Amane, whom he sees as belonging to a different caste. However, after accidentally dropping his eraser and overhearing them talking about anime, he realizes that they actually share similar interests. The three start a relationship, bonding over their shared fondness for anime, and both girls find themselves falling head over heels in love with Takuya, even though he remains completely oblivious.

== Characters ==
Takuya Seo (瀬尾卓也, Seo Takuya)
Voiced by: Shō Komura
An otaku student with a strong interest in anime and manga. He is secretly a fan of the series Glittery Monpets, also known as GlitterMon, and accidentally reveals this when he corrects Kei and Kotoko after overhearing them talk about it, which leads to him forming a connection with the two. He is fairly observant, often noticing when the girls get too close, do embarrassing things without realizing it, or when Kei is hiding her true feelings about being an otaku. He is very grateful for Kei and Kotoko's friendship, as it allows him to openly enjoy the hobby he loves and be himself. He easily gets flustered by the girls' actions, especially when they act affectionate around him, though he is completely oblivious to the girls being in love with him, and only sees them as good friends. He is also an online artist, making fan art of GlitterMon, although he only has 50 followers.
Kei Amane (天音 慶, Amane Kei)
Voiced by: Konomi Inagaki
One of Takuya's two gyaru classmates and a close friend of Kotoko. She has long brown hair and a more reserved personality. She is secretly an otaku, but tries to hide it by claiming her interest is on behalf of her sister, which does not fool Takuya. When it comes to anime and manga, she becomes very excited and tends to speak without holding back, sometimes saying strange things without realizing it. She truly values Takuya as a friend and is grateful to have someone she can openly share her hobbies with. Over time, she appears to gradually develop feelings for him, though he has no idea.
Kotoko Ijichi (伊地知 琴子, Ijichi Kotoko)
Voiced by: Yū Serizawa
One of Takuya's two gyaru classmates and a close friend of Kei. She has short golden hair and an outgoing, cheerful personality. She is very open-minded, quickly understanding Kei and Takuya's interests and even developing an interest herself. She is also observant, noticing Kei's otaku tendencies, her occasional slip-ups, and her growing relationship with Takuya. Outside of school, she helps take care of her siblings to support her mother, and appears much different—wearing glasses, with messier hair and no makeup—a side of her that Takuya has seen, much to her embarrassment. Deep down, she appreciates Takuya's honesty and kindness, and feels bad that he has no close friends. Like Kei, she also seems to gradually develop feelings for him, but he is oblivious.
Genichiro Ijichi (伊地知 弦一郎, Ijichi Genichirō)
Voiced by: Jun Kasama
Kotoko's older brother. He deeply cares about his family and is especially overprotective of his younger sister.
Sayu Amamiya (雨宮 紗優, Amamiya Sayu)
Voiced by: Konomi Kohara
An elementary school student who is Kei's next-door neighbor. Due to their close relationship, they consider themselves to be sisters.
Kakeru Ijichi (伊地知 翔, Ijichi Kakeru)
Voiced by: Atsumi Tanezaki
Kotoko's younger brother, who is attached to Sayu. He mistakes Takuya for being Kotoko's boyfriend.
Hibiki Ijichi (伊地知 響, Ijichi Hibiki)
Voiced by: Emiri Katō
Kotoko's younger brother. He has a crush on Sayu and also thinks that Takuya is Kotoko's boyfriend.

== Media ==
=== Manga ===
Written by Norishiro-chan and illustrated by Sakana Uozumi, Gals Can't Be Kind to Otaku!? began serialization in Coamix's seinen manga magazine Monthly Comic Zenon on August 25, 2021. Its chapters have been compiled into thirteen tankōbon volumes as of June 2026.

During their panel at Sakura-Con 2025, Yen Press announced that it had licensed the series for English publication.

No.	Original release date	Original ISBN	English release date	English ISBN
1	March 19, 2022	978-4-86720-321-7	November 4, 2025	979-8-8554-2287-0
1. "Otaku, Gals, GlitterMon, and..." 2. "Otaku, Gals, and Limited Edition Figures"; 3. "Otaku, Gals, and Life Outside of School"; 4. "Otaku, Gals, and Hanging Out at Home"; 5. "Otaku, Gals, and Contact Info"; 6. "Otaku, Gals, and Date out of Uniform"; 7. "Otaku, Gals, and Tests"
2	September 20, 2022	978-4-86720-425-2	March 24, 2026	979-8-8554-2289-4
8. "Otaku, Gals, and the Little Sister"; 9. "Otaku, Gals, and an After-School Date"; 10. "Otaku, Gals, and the Ball-Sports Tourney"; 11. "Otaku, Gals, and the Karaoke Competition"; 12. "Otaku, Gals, and the Beach BBQ"; 13. "Otaku, Gals, and Summer Festivals"
3	February 20, 2023	978-4-86720-474-0	October 27, 2026	979-8-8554-2291-7
14. "Otaku, Gals, and the Kids"; 15. "Otaku, Gals, and a Short-term Job"; 16. "Otaku, Gals, and Life After Seat Changes"; 17. "Otaku, Gals, and the School Festival"; 18. "Otaku, Gals, and School Festival Prep"; 19. "Otaku, Gals, and Working in Secret"; 20. "Otaku, Gals, and a Sleepover"; 21. "Otaku, Gals, and the Movie Screening"
4	June 20, 2023	978-4-86720-515-0	—	—
5	October 20, 2023	978-4-86720-575-4	—	—
6	February 20, 2024	978-4-86720-614-0	—	—
7	June 20, 2024	978-4-86720-659-1	—	—
8	October 19, 2024	978-4-86720-694-2	—	—
9	February 20, 2025	978-4-86720-738-3	—	—
10	June 20, 2025	978-4-86720-771-0	—	—
11	October 20, 2025	978-4-86720-809-0	—	—
12	March 19, 2026	978-4-86720-860-1	—	—
13	June 19, 2026	978-4-86720-899-1	—	—

=== Anime ===
An anime adaptation was announced on October 1, 2025. It was later revealed to be a television series produced by TMS Entertainment and directed by Shin Mita, with series composition by Kazuhiko Inukai, characters designed by Rion Matsuda, and music composed by Kō Satō. The series aired from April 8 to June 24, 2026, on the IMAnimation W programming block on TV Asahi and its affiliates. The opening theme song is "Hide and Seek", performed by I-dle, and the ending theme song is "Ishō Nakako" (一生仲仔), performed by Sun Soo Girl. Crunchyroll is streaming the series. A cover of the song "Plastic Love", sung by Serizawa as her character Kotoko Ijichi, was used as episode 6's ending theme song.

==== Episodes ====
No.	Title	Directed by	Written by	Storyboarded by	Original release date
1	"Can a Gal Be Kind to Otaku?"; Transliteration: "Otaku to Gyaru to Kiramon to" (Japanese: オタクとギャルとキラモンと)	Shin Mita	Kazuhiko Inukai	Shin Mita	April 8, 2026
2	"Is My Room a Hangout Spot for Gals?!"; Transliteration: "Boku no Heya ga Gyaru no Tamariba ni!?" (Japanese: ボクの部屋がギャルのたまり場に!?)	Minoru Tozawa	Kazuhiko Inukai	Hiroyuki Fukushima	April 15, 2026
3	"Do You Want to Come Over?"; Transliteration: "Uchi... Agatteku?" (Japanese: うち...上がってく?)	Taiki Nishimura	Kazuhiko Inukai	Hiroyuki Fukushima	April 22, 2026
4	"Let's Go to Karaoke"; Transliteration: "Karaoke Ikō" (Japanese: カラオケいこう♪)	Naoki Hishikawa	Aki Kindaichi	Susumu Nishizawa	April 29, 2026
5	"So? You Like Our Swimsuits?"; Transliteration: "Dō yo? Uchira no Mizugi wa" (Japanese: どうよ?うちらの水着は♡)	Moe Sasaki	Mutsumi Itō	Hiroyuki Fukushima	May 6, 2026
6	"Love?"; Transliteration: "Rabu?" (Japanese: ラブ?)	Daisuke Chiba	Kazuhiko Inukai	Osamu Yamasaki	May 13, 2026
7	"You're a Real Pickup Artist, Otaku-kun"; Transliteration: "Otaku-kun wa Kudoki Mada ne" (Japanese: オタクくんは口説き魔だね)	Moe Sasaki	Kazuhiko Inukai	Shigenori Kageyama	May 20, 2026
8	"A Slumber Party? No Way!"; Transliteration: "Otomarikai Nante Sonnā" (Japanese: お泊り会なんてそんなぁ)	Akira Yoshimura	Aki Kindaichi	Shigenori Kageyama	May 27, 2026
9	"This Was Your Idea, Kotoko Ijichi!"; Transliteration: "Hakatta na Ijichi Kotoko...!" (Japanese: 謀ったな伊地知琴子...!)	Isao Narita	Mutsumi Itō	Isao Narita	June 3, 2026
10	"The School Festival!!"; Transliteration: "Gakkōsai!!" (Japanese: 学校祭!!)	Takahiro Okao	Aki Kindaichi	Osamu Yamasaki	June 10, 2026
11	"Zing!"; Transliteration: "Zuki......" (Japanese: ズキ......ッ)	Wang Yi	Mutsumi Itō	Susumu Nishizawa	June 17, 2026
12	"Oh, Come On, Otaku-kun"; Transliteration: "Otaku-kun Saa" (Japanese: オタクくんさぁ〜)	Eiichi Kuboyama	Kazuhiko Inukai	Yasuichiro Yamamoto	June 24, 2026

== Reception ==
By February 2024, the series had over 500,000 copies in circulation.

== See also ==
- The Shy Hero and the Assassin Princesses, another manga series written by Norishiro-chan
