= City Hunter =

Japanese manga series by Tsukasa Hojo

- First tankōbon volume cover, featuring Ryo Saeba (left) and Kaori Makimura (right)

シティーハンター (Shitī Hantā)
- Genre: Action; Comedy; Detective
- Manga
- Written by: Tsukasa Hojo
- Published by: Shueisha
- English publisher: Coamix (digital); NA: Gutsoon! Entertainment (incomplete, defunct); Abrams ComicArts
- Imprint: Jump Comics
- Magazine: Weekly Shōnen Jump
- English magazine: NA: Raijin Comics
- Original run: February 26, 1985 – December 2, 1991
- Volumes: 35
- Anime television series
- City Hunter
- Live-action films
- City Hunter (1993, Hong Kong); Nicky Larson et le parfum de Cupidon (2019, France); City Hunter (2024, Japan)
- Live-action TV series
- City Hunter (2011, South Korea)
- Anime films
- City Hunter: Shinjuku Private Eyes (2019); City Hunter: Angel Dust (2023)
- Spin-off
- Angel Heart (2001–2017)
- icon

City Hunter (Japanese: シティーハンター, Hepburn: Shitī Hantā) is a Japanese manga series written and illustrated by Tsukasa Hojo. It was serialized in Shueisha's shōnen manga magazine Weekly Shōnen Jump from 1985 to 1991, with its chapters collected in 35 tankōbon volumes. The manga was adapted into an anime television series by Sunrise Studios in 1987. The anime series was popular in numerous Asian and European countries.

City Hunter spawned a media franchise consisting of numerous adaptations and spin-offs from several countries. The franchise includes four anime television series, three anime television specials, three made-for-television animated films, two animated feature films for theatrical release (Shinjuku Private Eyes in February 2019 and Angel Dust in September 2023), several live-action films (including City Hunter, a Hong Kong film starring Jackie Chan, and Nicky Larson et le Parfum de Cupidon, a French film), video games, and a live-action Korean TV drama. It also had a spin-off manga, Angel Heart, which in turn spawned its own anime television series and a live-action Japanese TV drama.

== Plot ==
The series follows the exploits of Ryo Saeba, a "sweeper" who is always found chasing beautiful girls and a private detective who works to rid Tokyo of crime, along with his associate or partner, Hideyuki Makimura. Their "City Hunter" business is an underground jack-of-all-trades operation, contacted by writing the letters "XYZ" on a communal message blackboard at Shinjuku Station.

One day, Hideyuki is murdered, and Ryo must take care of Hideyuki's sister, Kaori, a tomboy who becomes his new partner in the process. However, Kaori is very susceptible and jealous, often hitting Ryo with a giant hammer when he does something perverted. The story also follows the behind-the-scenes romance between Ryo and Kaori and the way they cooperate throughout each mission.

== Characters ==
Ryo Saeba (冴羽 獠, Saeba Ryō)
Voiced by: Akira Kamiya (Japanese); Martin Blacker (ADV Films dub), Stephen Fu (Discotek Media dub) (English)
Ryo is the main protagonist of the series. At the age of three, Ryo was the only survivor of a plane crash in Central America. He was raised as a guerilla fighter and has no knowledge of his prior identity. After the war, Ryo makes his way to the United States, before eventually moving to Tokyo.
While in Tokyo, he forms the "City Hunter" team with Hideyuki Makimura, but after Hideyuki's death, Kaori takes his place as Ryo's new partner. A highly skilled gunman, Ryo is known for executing the "one-hole shot", a series of shots that all land in exactly the same spot on the target. His preferred weapon is the Colt Python .357 Magnum.
Ryo invented the nickname Umibozu for his fellow colleague Hayato Ijuin, and he answered giving Ryo his own, "The Stallion of Shinjuku" (新宿の種馬, Shinjuku no Taneuma) (an ironic name, because Ryo is a real pervert who tries to hit on any beautiful woman he meets or sees, failing every time). Ryo is an accomplished marksman with revolvers, semiautomatic guns, machine-pistols, rifles, carbines and crossbows; he knows hand-to-hand combat very well and drives as a real daredevil when needed; his car is a Mini.
Kaori Makimura (槇村 香, Makimura Kaori)
Voiced by: Kazue Ikura (Japanese); Pamela Ribon (ADV Films dub), Morgan Garrett (Discotek Media dub) (English)
Kaori is Ryo Saeba's partner. She is primarily responsible for arranging clients and other managerial tasks. Ryo's skirt-chasing rouses her ire more than just once. Though the partners frequently pick on fights or arguments, they actually form a great team together. She might have been mistaken as a man sometimes due to her hairstyle. She is Hideyuki's adoptive sister, her birth name being Kaori Hisaishi (久石 香, Hisaishi Kaori).
Hideyuki Makimura (槇村 秀幸, Makimura Hideyuki)
Voiced by: Hideyuki Tanaka
Hideyuki is Kaori's adopted older brother and Ryo's partner at the beginning of the series. Kaori is not related to him by blood, his father had adopted her when she was a child. He is a former police detective with a strong sense of justice. Kaori become Ryo's partner and takes over her brother's role after he is murdered by gangsters. His last wish before he died was for Ryo to take care of his sister. His first name is not specified in the original manga, but when it was adapted into an anime, the official setting for his first name was established as 'Hideyuki', the same as the voice actor who voiced him.
Umibōzu (海坊主)
Voiced by: Tesshō Genda (Japanese); Lou Perryman (ADV Films dub), Adam Dudley (The Secret Service; ADV Films dub), Chris Rager (Discotek Media dub) (English)
Umibōzu is another "sweeper" working the rounds in Tokyo. Umibozu is a Special Forces enemy of Ryo's from the Central America conflict. Despite being on opposing forces, the two develop a friendship and mutual respect. Between his jobs, Umibozu works as waiter at the Cat's Eye café, owned by Miki, his former fellow soldier and lover. He goes by the professional name Falcon (ファルコン, Farukon) and his real name is Hayato Ijuin (伊集院 隼人, Ijūin Hayato); the kanji haya in his name can also be read hayabusa (falcon in Japanese), hence his professional name; the nickname "Umibōzu" was given by Ryo. His favorite weapons are the S&W M29 .44 Magnum six-inch revolver, the Saco-Defense M60 machine-gun (sometimes he uses the M249) and the M1A6 bazooka. Despite his fearsome appearance he has a phobia of kittens, he is very shy with women and much more unselfish than Ryo. His vision is very weak because a fight he had with Ryo in Central America, when Ryo was a guerrilla fighter and Umibozu was a mercenary; since then, Umibozu wants a duel with Ryo to close that story; during the series, he will go permanently blind and he'll have to learn how to use the other four senses to move and fight; however, he decides to not retire before finishing their matter. Later Shin Kaibara, Ryo's adoptive father and former guerrilla fighter who became a drug lord, comes in Japan; his drug was tested on Ryo during his youth, causing him to attack Umibozu and his unit; when Umibozu learns this from Bloody Mary, an old acquaintance of Ryo's and daughter of the other Ryo's fatherly figure in the jungle, he joins Ryo and Kaori against Kaibara. During the last story arc he marries Miki, but she is shot by enemy soldiers deployed by a new enemy of Ryo; Umibozu enters the firefight trusting Miki will not die.
The Umibōzu is a yokai (spirit) from Japanese folklore; he is said to turn ships upside down if someone aboard talks to him; he is portrayed bald as a bōzu (Buddhist monk); the character umi means 'sea'.
Miki (美樹)
Voiced by: Mami Koyama, Miki Itō (Bay City Wars, Million Dollar Conspiracy) (Japanese); Amalia Stifter (ADV Films dub), Johanna McKeon (The Secret Service; ADV Films dub), Michelle Rojas (Discotek Media dub) (English)
Miki was a war orphan who Umibozu found in a completely destroyed village. Contrary to her habits, Umibozu decided to take her with him and teach her everything she knew so that she would one day be able to get by on her own. Only when Miki shows her intentions of joining the Umibozu guerrilla squad will she understand that she has radically changed her life, and feeling guilty will he try to make her a "normal" girl again by abandoning her, after making her believe that he would return to the civilized world with her. Miki, however, does not give up and after much research she manages to find her Falcon and make him accept a pact: if she manages to kill Ryo Saeba, Umibozu will agree to marry her. To do this Miki will become the owner of the Cat's Eye, where Ryo will begin to go more and more often attracted by the beauty of the woman. In the end Miki does not kill Ryo, but thanks to Kaori's complicity and that of Ryo himself, she is still able to have him next to her in the Cat's Eye, until they get married. The Cat's Eye becomes a staple of the anime and a favorite bar for the two sweepers, as that's where they will always take their customers and give rise to the most spectacular fights.
Saeko Nogami (野上 冴子, Nogami Saeko)
Voiced by: Yōko Asagami (Japanese); Jana Brockman (ADV Films dub); Marissa Lenti (Discotek Media dub) (English)
Saeko is a Tokyo police detective and Reika's older sister who often outsources certain tasks to the City Hunter team. Ryo keeps a long and detailed list of what Saeko owes him for the various favours he has done for her, which she always manages to avoid paying.
Reika Nogami (野上 麗香, Nogami Reika)
Voiced by: Yoshino Takamori (Japanese); Katherine Catmull (ADV Films dub) (English)
She is the private investigator of "RN Detective Agency", the younger sister of Saeko Nogami and the neighbor of Ryo Saeba.
Kasumi Asou (麻生かすみ, Asō Kasumi)
Voiced by: Miina Tominaga
She was one of Ryo Saeba's clients after Ryo himself finds out that Kasumi is Phantom 305, a night thief in the making with similar motives as to the members of Cat's Eye,
Shin Kaibara (海原 神, Kaibara Shin)
Voiced by: Kenyuu Horiuchi
He was a guerilla fighter fighting alongside Ryo Saeba and Bloody Mary's father. Currently he is the leader of Union Teope, a drug syndicate.

== Media ==
=== Manga ===
Written and illustrated by Tsukasa Hojo, City Hunter started in Shueisha's shōnen manga anthology Weekly Shōnen Jump on February 26, 1985, and ran until the December 2, 1991, issue. Its chapters were collected by Shueisha in 35 volumes, under the Jump Comics imprint, between January 15, 1986, and April 15, 1992. In these volumes the series is grouped into 55 different stories or "episodes" instead of as their original individual chapters. Each story is centred on a different female character or "heroine". An 18-volume bunkoban edition was released by Shueisha from June 18, 1996, to October 17, 1997. A third edition City Hunter Complete Edition of 32 volumes was published by Tokuma Shoten from December 16, 2003, to April 15, 2005. To celebrate the 30th anniversary of the series, a fourth edition, City Hunter XYZ edition, was published by Tokuma Shoten across twelve volumes from July 18 to December 19, 2015. In 2019, a fifth edition, City Hunter Zenon Selection, was released in 29 volumes by Coamix to coincide with the French live-action adaptation of City Hunter, Nicky Larson et le parfum de Cupidon.

Attempts were made to license the series for the American comic market during the 1980s; however, Hojo insisted the manga should be released in the right-to-left format. In 2002 Coamix created an American subsidiary, Gutsoon! Entertainment. City Hunter was a flagship title in their Raijin Comics anthology. Raijin switched from a weekly format to a monthly format before being cancelled after 46 issues. In 2022, Coamix's MangaHot service began publishing City Hunter manga in English digitally. In April 2025, Abrams ComicArts announced that it will start releasing the manga in an omnibus edition in print under its Kana imprint on September 9 of the same year. Kana is using a new English translation for the release.

==== Spin-offs ====
From 2001 to 2017, Hojo serialized a spin-off series titled Angel Heart. The series takes place in a universe parallel to City Hunter, where the character of Kaori Makimura is killed and her heart transplanted into Xiang-Ying, Angel Heart's protagonist.

A spin-off manga by Sokura Nishiki, City Hunter Rebirth (今日からCITY HUNTER, Kyō Kara City Hunter; lit. 'Today from City Hunter'), was launched in Tokuma Shoten's Monthly Comic Zenon magazine on July 25, 2017. It is centered around a 40-year-old unmarried woman who is a fan of Ryō Saeba and the City Hunter manga, and suddenly dies in a train accident and is reincarnated into the world of City Hunter.

A spin-off manga by Est Em, City Hunter Gaiden: Mr. Hayato Ijuin's Not Peaceful Life (CITY HUNTER外伝 伊集院隼人氏の平穏ならぬ日常, City Hunter Gaiden: Ijūin Hayato-shi no Heion Naranu Nichijō), was serialized in Monthly Comic Zenon from April 29, 2019, to August 27, 2021, and compiled into five volumes.

=== Anime ===
The series was adapted into an anime series produced by Sunrise, directed by Kanetsugu Kodama and broadcast by Yomiuri Television.

- City Hunter was broadcast for 51 episodes between April 6, 1987, and March 28, 1988, and released on ten VHS cassettes between December 1987 and July 1988.
- City Hunter 2 was broadcast for 63 episodes between April 8, 1988, and July 14, 1989, and released on ten VHS cassettes between August 1988 and March 1990.
- City Hunter 3 was broadcast for 13 episodes from October 15, 1989, to January 21, 1990, and released on six VHS cassettes between November 1990 and April 1991.
- City Hunter '91 was broadcast between April 28 and October 10, 1991, and released on six VHS cassettes between February and July 1992.

The series was later reissued as 20 video compilations.

A 32-disc DVD boxset, City Hunter Complete, was published by Aniplex and released in Japan on August 31, 2005. The set contained all four series, the TV specials and animated movies as well as an art book and figures of Ryo and Kaori. 26 of the discs comprising the four series were then released individually between December 19, 2007, and August 27, 2008. 30,000 box sets were sold, grossing ¥3 billion ($38 million), in Japan.

For the 30th anniversary of the original manga, buyers of all 12 volumes of City Hunter XYZ edition were entitled receive a "motion graphic anime" DVD. The DVDe adapted a special Angel Heart chapter entitled "Ryo's Proposal" and was voiced by the original City Hunter cast.

The series was licensed by ADV Films for release in North America; they announced their acquisition in May 1998 at Project A-Kon 9. The first City Hunter series was released on the ADV Fansubs label in March 2000. The aim of this label was to provide cheaper subtitled-only VHS releases at a faster pace than usual. The series was scheduled for 13 tapes, consisting of four episodes each. The tapes could be ordered individually or as a subscription service.

ADV later released the series on DVD. The first series was released as two boxsets of five discs on July 29, 2003. City Hunter 2 was released as another two boxsets of five discs on October 28, and November 18, 2003. City Hunter 3 was released as a single boxset on December 2, 2003, and City Hunter '91 was released on December 16, 2003.

On April 20, 2019, Discotek Media announced that they had licensed the entire City Hunter animated franchise, including the 2019 movie, Shinjuku Private Eyes. The first 26 episodes of the first series were released on Blu-ray on February 25, 2020, and City Hunter '91 was released on April 26, 2022.

==== Theatrical movies ====
Three theatrical movies were released in 1989 and 1990: .357 Magnum was released on June 17, 1989, Bay City Wars was released on August 25, 1990, and Million Dollar Conspiracy was released on August 25, 1990.

ADV released .357 Magnum on VHS on August 10, 1999, and on DVD on April 8, 2003. They released Bay City Wars and Million Dollar Conspiracy on VHS on October 12, 1999, and January 25, 2000, respectively, and later released a DVD containing them as well as a bonus television episode, "The Lady Vanishes", on June 3, 2003. During their panel at Otakon 2022, Discotek Media announced that they licensed all the previously licensed ADV film releases and Death of the Vicious Criminal Ryo Saeba television movie, and released them in a Blu-ray collection on January 31, 2023.

A theatrical movie produced by Aniplex, titled City Hunter: Shinjuku Private Eyes, set in present-day Shinjuku, premiered in Japan on February 8, 2019, after Sunrise and Kenji Kodama returned to animate and direct the film, respectively. The Kisugi sisters of Cat's Eye appeared in the film as a crossover. Discotek Media premiered the English dub of the movie at Otakon 2019, and released it on Blu-ray on May 26, 2020.

Another film, City Hunter: Angel Dust, was released on September 8, 2023.

==== Television movies ====
Three television movies were produced: The Secret Service was broadcast on January 5, 1996, which was followed by Goodbye My Sweetheart on April 25, 1997, and Death of Vicious Criminal Ryo Saeba on April 23, 1999.

ADV released Goodbye, My Sweetheart as City Hunter: The Motion Picture in North America on VHS on November 18, 1998, as their first release from the franchise, later releasing it on DVD on July 23, 2002. They released The Secret Service on VHS on December 5, 2000, and on DVD on June 25, 2002. Discotek Media released Death of the Vicious Criminal Ryo Saeba with all films previously licensed by ADV in a Blu-ray collection on January 31, 2023.

=== Live action ===
==== Hong Kong films ====
Saviour of the Soul (九一神鵰俠侶 Gauyat sandiu haplui) is a live-action Hong Kong film from 1991 that uses the characters from City Hunter but changes the plot. In 1996, Mr. Mumble kept the concept of City Hunter but changed the characters' names.

In 1993, a live-action Hong Kong theatrical adaptation of the series was released. The film was directed by Wong Jing and starred Jackie Chan as Ryo Saeba, Wang Zuxian as Kaori, and Japanese idol Kumiko Goto. During filming of the movie, Chan dislocated his shoulder. The movie has been criticised by Chan. Fortune Star and 20th Century Fox later released it on R1 DVD along with other budget classic HK films.

==== Proposed Chinese film ====
In 2016, a new Chinese film based on City Hunter was announced to be in development. It was announced that it would be directed by Hong Kong filmmaker Stanley Tong and star Chinese actor Huang Xiaoming as Ryo Saeba.

==== French film ====
A separate French action comedy film Nicky Larson et le Parfum de Cupidon (lit. 'Nicky Larson and Cupid's Perfume') was released in France on February 6, 2019. The French adaptation has Philippe Lacheau as director as well as the star, playing the title character Nicky Larson (as Ryo Saeba is known in the French dubs of the anime series).

==== Netflix film ====
In December 2022, Netflix announced a live-action film adaptation in the works with lead actor Ryohei Suzuki as Ryo Saeba and Misato Morita as Kaori Makimura. Directed by Yūichi Satō, the film premiered on the streaming service on April 25, 2024.

==== Television series ====
A planned live-action television series of City Hunter was announced in 2008, to be produced and distributed by Fox Television Studios and South Korean media company SSD. Jung Woo-sung, was scheduled to play Ryo alongside Hollywood-based stars, with location filming in Seoul and Tokyo.

In 2011, the series was adapted into a Korean television series of the same name by SBS, starring Lee Min-ho and Park Min-young. The series is available to watch with English subtitles on the streaming service Hulu.

In 2014, there was a Chinese television series based on City Hunter, with the title Cheng Shi Lie Ren (Chinese: 城市猎人).

In 2015, the spin-off manga Angel Heart received its own live-action Japanese TV drama adaptation.

=== Musical ===
In 2021, the Takarazuka Revue produced a musical version titled City Hunter: Nusumareta XYZ (CITY HUNTER－盗まれたXYZ－). It was performed at the Takarazuka Grand Theater from August 7 to September 13, 2021, and then at the Tokyo Takarazuka Theater from October 2 to November 14. The musical starred Sakina Ayakaze as Ryo Saeba and Kiwa Asazuki as Kaori Makimura.

=== Video games ===
A City Hunter video game for the PC Engine was released by Sunsoft on March 2, 1990.

Ryo appears as a playable character in the crossover fighting game Jump Force.

== Reception ==
By 2016, the City Hunter manga series had sold over 50 million tankōbon volumes worldwide. In addition, the series was circulated in an estimated 900 million copies of Weekly Shōnen Jump manga magazine between 1985 and 1991, with those Jump issues generating an estimated $2 billion. (Note: See Weekly Shōnen Jump § Circulation figures) The series voted as the 19th "Most Powerful" series to have featured in Shonen Jump. On TV Asahi's Manga Sōsenkyo 2021 poll, in which 150.000 people voted for their top 100 manga series, City Hunter ranked 57th.

In Manga: The Complete Guide, Jason Thompson described the manga stories as "well told and entertaining". Writing for Mania.com, Eduardo M. Chavez describes the series as "funny, sexy, action packed and at times just plain whacked" and praises the mix of action and comedy. Patrick King of Animefringe described the series as "not the most intellectually stimulating piece of fiction I've experienced lately" but called it "a blast to read".

== Legacy ==
A replica of Kaori's "100-ton hammer" raised ¥1.832 million ($17,150) on Yahoo Auctions in 2007. It was the biggest selling charity item of the year for the service.

In 2012, the characters of Ryo, Kaori and Umibozu appeared in a video for the virtual musician Mana. Mana is a collaboration between Hojo and Tetsuya Komuro of TM Network.

The cover for the 2015 Chris Brown single "Zero" was allegedly copied from one of Hojo's City Hunter sketches.
