= Kū Neru Futari Sumu Futari =

Japanese manga and television series

喰う寝るふたり 住むふたり
- Genre: Slice of life, gastronomy
- Manga
- Written by: Kinoko Higurashi
- Published by: Tokuma Shoten
- Magazine: Monthly Comic Zenon
- Original run: November 20, 2012 (volume 1) – March 20, 2015 (volume 5)
- Volumes: 5
- Television drama
- Original network: NHK BS Premium
- Original run: May 6, 2014 – June 24, 2014
- Episodes: 8

Kū Neru Futari Sumu Futari (Japanese: 喰う寝るふたり 住むふたり; "Eating and Sleeping Couple, Living Together Couple") is a Japanese slice of life gastronomy seinen manga series written and illustrated by Kinoko Higurashi. It was published by Tokuma Shoten, with serialization on Monthly Comic Zenon and with five volumes compiling the chapters released between 2012 and 2015. It was adapted into an 8-episode television drama series that aired on NHK BS Premium from May 6 to June 24, 2014.

== Characters ==
- Ritsuko
- Shuichi

== Volumes ==
- 1 (November 20, 2012)
- 2 (March 19, 2013)
- 3 (February 20, 2014)
- 4 (August 20, 2014)
- 5 (March 20, 2015)

== Reception ==
Volume 3 reached the 13th place on the weekly Oricon manga charts and, as of March 9, 2014, had sold 110,485 copies; volume 4 reached the 12th place and, as of August 31, 2014, had sold 124,715 copies; volume 5 reached the 8th place and, as of April 5, 2015, had sold 160,894 copies.

It was number 9 (together with four other manga) on the 2013 Comic Natalie Grand Prize. It was also number 13 on the 2014 Kono Manga ga Sugoi! Top 20 Manga for Male Readers survey and number 8 in the Nationwide Bookstore Employees' Recommended Comics of 2014.
