= Record of Ragnarok =

Japanese manga series

- First tankōbon volume cover, featuring Lü Bu (left) and Thor (right)

終末のワルキューレ (Shūmatsu no Warukyūre)
- Genre: Adventure; Dark fantasy; Martial arts
- Manga
- Written by: Shinya Umemura; Takumi Fukui
- Illustrated by: Azychika
- Published by: Tokuma Shoten (former); Coamix
- English publisher: NA: Viz Media
- Magazine: Monthly Comic Zenon
- Original run: November 25, 2017 – present
- Volumes: 29
- Manga

Ryo Fu Hō Sen Hishōden
- Written by: Takeo Ono
- Published by: Tokuma Shoten (former); Coamix
- Magazine: Monthly Comic Zenon
- Original run: October 25, 2019 – November 25, 2022
- Volumes: 7
- Original net animation
- Directed by: Masao Ōkubo (S1 & S2); Koichi Hatsumi (S3)
- Written by: Kazuyuki Fudeyasu (S1 & S2); Yuka Yamada (S2); Yasuyuki Mutō (S3)
- Music by: Yasuharu Takanashi
- Studio: Graphinica (S1 & S2); Yumeta Company (S2 & S3); Maru Animation (S3)
- Licensed by: Netflix (streaming); NA: Viz Media (home video)
- Released: June 17, 2021 – present
- Runtime: 24 minutes
- Episodes: 42
- Manga

Kitan: Jack the Ripper no Jikenbo
- Written by: Keita Iizuka
- Published by: Coamix
- Magazine: Monthly Comic Zenon
- Original run: October 25, 2022 – present
- Volumes: 12
- Manga

Kinden: Kamigami no Apocalypse
- Written by: Otsuhiko Naruse
- Illustrated by: Ippei Okamoto
- Published by: Coamix
- Magazine: Monthly Comic Zenon
- Original run: June 25, 2024 – present
- Volumes: 7
- icon

Record of Ragnarok (Japanese: 終末のワルキューレ, Hepburn: Shūmatsu no Warukyūre; lit. 'Doomsday Valkyrie') is a Japanese manga series written by Shinya Umemura and Takumi Fukui and illustrated by Azychika about a fighting tournament featuring prominent historical figures against gods from various mythologies, with the fate of mankind in the balance. It began in Coamix's (formerly also published by Tokuma Shoten) seinen manga magazine Monthly Comic Zenon in November 2017. It was licensed in North America by Viz Media in June 2021.

The manga was adapted as an original net animation (ONA) series by Graphinica and premiered in June 2021 on Netflix. A second season by Graphinica and Yumeta Company premiered in January 2023. A third season by Yumeta Company and Maru Animation premiered in December 2025. A fourth season has been announced.

== Plot ==
The Gods' Council assembles once every millennium to decide the fate of humanity, deciding that mankind's seven million years of irredeemable history gives justification for their extinction. But the valkyrie Brunhilde proposes giving humanity one last chance to prove their worth, and the gods agree to hold the tournament of Ragnarök, where humanity will be spared if they can beat the gods in seven out of thirteen matches. Humanity's representatives are the Einherjar, notable humans across history who are each granted a valkyrie who becomes a powerful weapon tailored for their user's combat style called "Volund", at the risk of losing her life if the user is killed.

== Media ==
=== Manga ===
Record of Ragnarok is written by Shinya Umemura and Takumi Fukui and illustrated by Azychika. It began in Coamix's (formerly also published by Tokuma Shoten) Monthly Comic Zenon on November 25, 2017. Its chapters has been collected into individual tankōbon volumes. The first volume was released on May 19, 2018. As of November 20, 2026, twenty-nine volumes have been released.

On June 17, 2021, Viz Media announced that it had licensed the series for English release in North America. The first volume was released in digital form on October 26, 2021, and in print on January 18, 2022.

A spin-off manga titled Shūmatsu no Valkyrie: Ryo Fu Hō Sen Hishōden (終末のワルキューレ異聞 呂布奉先飛将伝) was serialized in Monthly Comic Zenon from October 25, 2019, to November 25, 2022. Its chapters have been collected into individual tankōbon volumes. The first volume was released on April 20, 2020. As of December 20, 2022, seven volumes have been released.

A spin-off manga centered around the Jack the Ripper character titled Shūmatsu no Walküre Kitan – Jack the Ripper no Jikenbo began serialization in Monthly Comic Zenon on October 25, 2022. Its chapters have been collected into individual tankōbon volumes. The first volume was released on March 20, 2023. As of November 20, 2026, twelve volumes have been released.

A spin-off manga from the viewpoint of the Gods titled Shūmatsu no Walküre Kinden: Kamigami no Apocalypse began serialization in Monthly Comic Zenon on June 25, 2024. The first volume was released on November 20, 2024. As of November 20, 2026, seven volumes have been released.

==== Record of Ragnarok ====
No.	Original release date	Original ISBN	English release date	English ISBN
1	May 19, 2018	978-4-19-980495-3	October 26, 2021 (digital); January 18, 2022 (print)	978-1-9747-2786-5
1. "The Final Conflict" (神VS人類最終闘争, Kami vāsasu Jinrui Saishū Tōsō); 2. "Ultimate Gods vs. Ultimate Humans" (最強神VS最強人類, Saikyō-Shin vāsasu Saikyō Jinrui); 3. "Archrival" (好敵手, Kōtekishu); 4. "Thirteen Gods and Thirteen Humans" (13神と13人, 13 Kami to 13-Nin)
2	September 20, 2018	978-4-19-980517-2	April 19, 2022	978-1-9747-2787-2
5. "Coup de Grace" (必殺技, Hissatsu Waza); 6. "Exuberance" (歓喜, Kanki); 7. "File No. 00000000001"; 8. "Unexpected" (想定外, Sōtei-gai); 9. "Impeccable Imitation" (華麗なる模倣, Kareinaru Mohō)
3	March 20, 2019	978-4-19-980557-8	July 19, 2022	978-1-9747-2977-7
10. "Expulsion from Paradise" (楽園追放, Rakuen Tsuihō); 11. "Metamorphosis" (変態, Hentai); 12. "Overflowing Love" (あふれる愛, Afureru Ai); 13. "Prime" (全盛期, Zenseiki); 14. "Tyrant of the Seas" (大海の暴君, Taikai no Bōkun)
4	July 20, 2019	978-4-19-980581-3	October 18, 2022	978-1-9747-2978-4
15. "The Violent God Wiped from History" (消えた暴神, Kieta Bōkami); 16. "The Greatest Loser" (最強の敗者, Saikyō no Haisha); 17. "Secret Technique" (秘剣“燕返し“, Hi Ken "Tsubame Gaeshi"); 18. "The Truth About Ganryu Island" (巌流島の真実, Ganryūjima no Shinjitsu)
5	November 20, 2019	978-4-19-980603-2	January 17, 2023	978-1-9747-2979-1
19. "The Swallow Gazes into the Abyss" (燕が見た深淵, Tsubame ga Mita Shin'en); 20. "Justice vs. Evil" (正義VS悪, Seigi vāsasu Aku); 21. "Conditions of a Gentleman" (紳士の条件, Shinshi no Jōken)
6	April 20, 2020	978-4-86720-119-0	April 18, 2023	978-1-9747-2980-7
22. "Heracles's Choice" (ヘラクレスの選択, Herakuresu no Sentaku); 23. "The Indomitable Hero" (不屈の闘神, Fukutsu no Tōjin); 24. "The 12 Labors" (十二の災禍と罪過, Erukyūru Ekusodasu); 25. "Birth of a Monster" (怪物の誕生, Kaibutsu no Tanjō)
7	June 19, 2020	978-4-86720-155-8	July 18, 2023	978-1-9747-2981-4
26. "Truth" (真相, Shinsō); 27. "Endless Love" (底なしの愛, Sokonashi no Ai); 28. "The Final Labor of a God" (最後の御業, Saigo no Miwaza); 29. "I am the Victorious" (勝ったのはオレだ, Katta no wa Oreda)
8	September 19, 2020	978-4-86720-168-8	October 17, 2023	978-1-9747-2982-1
30. "Repose of Souls" (鎮魂, Chinkon); 31. "Round Five" (第五回戦, Dai-Go Kaisen); 32. "Exchange" (応酬, Ōshu); 33. "100 Seals" (百閉, Hyakuhei)
9	December 19, 2020	978-4-86720-187-9	January 16, 2024	978-1-9747-4277-6
34. "Divergent Agendas" (それぞれの思惑, Sorezore no Omowaku); 35. "Unrestrained vs. Unrestrained" (全開VS全開, Zenkai vāsasu Zenkai); 36. "Destruction and Storm" (破壊と暴風, Hakai to Bōfū); 37. "The Top of India" (印度の天辺, Indo no Teppen)
10	March 18, 2021	978-4-86720-204-3	April 16, 2024	978-1-9747-4278-3
38. "Time of Awakening" (覚醒の刻, Kakusei no Toki); 39. "Forbidden Technique" (禁じ手, Kinjite); 40. "Sympathetic Resonance" (共鳴, Kyōmei); 41. "Thank You" (ありがとう, Arigatō)
11	June 18, 2021	978-4-86720-240-1	July 16, 2024	978-1-9747-4614-9
42. "On the Brink" (崖っぷち, Gakeppuchi); 43. "Round Six" (第6回戦, Dai 6 Kaisen); 44. "Zero" (零); 45. "Zero's Sorrow" (零の哀しみ, Zero no Kanashimi)
12	September 18, 2021	978-4-86720-263-0	October 15, 2024	978-1-9747-4912-6
46. "Culmination" (結晶, Kesshō); 47. "The Path to Enlightenment" (至る道, Itaru Michi); 48. "Bliss" (幸福, Kōfuku); 49. "The Legend of the Underworld" (冥界の伝説, Meikai no Densetsu)
13	December 20, 2021	978-4-86720-285-2	January 21, 2025	978-1-9747-5163-1
50. "The Legend of Helheim" (消える光, Kieru Hikari); 51. "Seed and Soil" (種と土, Shu to Tsuchi); 52. "Light and Shadow" (光と影, Hikari to Kage); 53. "Path of Light" (光の道, Hikari no Michi)
14	March 19, 2022	978-4-86720-316-3	April 15, 2025	978-1-9747-5246-1
54. "Replacement" (代役, Daiyaku); 55. "Taboo" (禁忌, Kinki); 56. "King vs. King" (王VS王, Ō vāsasu Ō); 57. "Chiyou" (蚩尤, Shiyū)
15	June 20, 2022	978-4-86720-389-7; 978-4-86720-390-3 (SE)	July 15, 2025	978-1-9747-5470-0
58. "Blindfold" (目隠し, Mekakushi); 59. "The Greatest King" (最高の王, Saikō no Ō); 60. "Promise and Oath" (約束と誓い, Yakusoku to Chikai); 61. "Pride of the King of Helheim" (冥王の矜持, Meiō no Kyōji)
16	September 20, 2022	978-4-86720-415-3; 978-4-86720-416-0 (SE)	October 21, 2025	978-1-9747-5536-3
62. "Big Brother of the Gods" (神々の兄, Kamigami no Ani); 63. "The Beginning of the End" (終わりの始まり, Owari no Hajimari); 64. "The Return of the King" (王の帰還, Ō no Kikan); 65. "Kintoki" (金ちゃん, Kin-chan); 66. "Creation and Imagination" (創造と想像, Sōzō to Sōzō)
17	December 20, 2022	978-4-86720-446-7; 978-4-86720-447-4 (SE)	January 20, 2026	978-1-9747-6101-2
67. "Anathema" (アナテマ, Anatema); 68. "Darkness vs. Light" (闇VS光, Yami vāsasu Hikari); 69. "The Fly's Beating Wings" (蠅の羽ばたき, Hae no Habataki); 70. "Prison of the Gods" (神々の監獄, Kamigami no Kangoku)
18	March 20, 2023	978-4-86720-480-1; 978-4-86720-481-8 (SE)	April 21, 2026	978-1-9747-6259-0
71. "Science Retaliates" (科学の反撃, Kagaku no Hangeki); 72. "Human Progress" (人類の進歩, Jinrui no Shinpo); 73. "Curse and Prayer" (呪いと祈り, Noroi to Inori); 74. "Carrying on the Spirit" (繋ぐ想い, Tsunagu Omoi)
19	July 20, 2023	978-4-86720-522-8; 978-4-86720-523-5 (SE)	July 21, 2026	978-1-9747-6507-2
75. "To the Future" (未来へ, Mirai e); 76. "Advancement" (前進, Zenshin); 77. "Hero of Tartarus" (奈落の英雄, Naraku no Eiyū); 78. "The Sun God and The Defiant Hero" (太陽神と反骨の英雄, Taiyō-Shin to Hankotsu no Eiyū)
20	November 20, 2023	978-4-86720-585-3; 978-4-86720-586-0 (SE)	October 20, 2026	978-1-9747-6544-7
79. "The Rebel King" (叛逆の王, Hangyaku no Ō); 80. "Phoebus Apollo" (ポイボス・アポロン, Poibosu Aporon); 81. "Pride vs. Determination" (誇りVS意地, Hokori vāsasu Iji); 82. "Know Thyself" (汝自身を知れ, Nanji Jishin wo Shire)
21	March 19, 2024	978-4-86720-626-3	January 19, 2027	978-1-9747-7001-4
22	July 20, 2024	978-4-86720-671-3	—	—
23	November 20, 2024	978-4-86720-701-7	—	—
24	March 19, 2025	978-4-86720-748-2	—	—
25	July 18, 2025	978-4-86720-787-1	—	—
26	November 20, 2025	978-4-86720-833-5	—	—
27	March 19, 2026	978-4-86720-874-8	—	—
28	July 17, 2026	978-4-86720-906-6	—	—
29	November 20, 2026	978-4-86720-942-4	—	—

==== Ryo Fu Hō Sen Hishōden ====
No.	Release date	ISBN
1	April 20, 2020	978-4-86720-120-6
2	September 19, 2020	978-4-86720-169-5
3	December 19, 2020	978-4-86720-188-6
4	June 18, 2021	978-4-86720-243-2
5	December 20, 2021	978-4-86720-286-9
6	June 20, 2022	978-4-86720-391-0
7	December 20, 2022	978-4-86720-448-1

==== Kitan: Jack the Ripper no Jikenbo ====
No.	Release date	ISBN
1	March 20, 2023	978-4-86720-482-5
2	July 20, 2023	978-4-86720-524-2
3	November 20, 2023	978-4-86720-587-7
4	March 19, 2024	978-4-86720-627-0
5	July 20, 2024	978-4-86720-666-9
6	November 20, 2024	978-4-86720-700-0
7	March 19, 2025	978-4-86720-747-5
8	July 18, 2025	978-4-86720-780-2
9	November 20, 2025	978-4-86720-832-8
10	March 19, 2026	978-4-86720-868-7
11	July 17, 2026	978-4-86720-905-9
12	November 20, 2026	978-4-86720-939-4

==== Kinden: Kamigami no Apocalypse ====
No.	Release date	ISBN
1	November 20, 2024	978-4-86720-699-7
2	March 19, 2025	978-4-86720-746-8
3	July 18, 2025	978-4-86720-778-9
4	November 20, 2025	978-4-86720-831-1
5	March 19, 2026	978-4-86720-865-6
6	July 17, 2026	978-4-86720-904-2
7	November 20, 2026	978-4-86720-937-0

=== Anime ===
In December 2020, it was announced that the series would receive an anime series adaptation produced by Warner Bros. Japan and animated by Graphinica. It is directed by Masao Ōkubo, with series composition by Kazuyuki Fudeyasu, character designs by Masaki Saito and music composed by Yasuharu Takanashi. Licensed by Netflix, the series premiered on June 17, 2021, on the streaming service. The opening theme is "Kamigami" (KAMIGAMI-神噛-; lit. 'God Bite'), performed by Maximum the Hormone, while the ending theme is "Fukahi" (不可避; lit. 'Unavoidable'), performed by SymaG. In North America, the first season has been licensed for home video release by Viz Media and was released on Blu-ray on April 4, 2023.

In August 2021, it was announced that the series had been renewed for a second season. The main staff returned from the first season, with Yumeta Company producing the series alongside Graphinica, and Yuka Yamada writing the scripts alongside Fudeyasu. The season consists of 15 episodes, with the first 10 episodes premiering on January 26, 2023, and the remaining five releasing on July 12 of the same year. The opening theme is "Rude, Loose Dance" (ルードルーズダンス, Rūdo Rūzu Dansu), performed by Minami, while the ending theme is "Inori" (祈; lit. 'Prayer'), performed by Masatoshi Ono.

In March 2025, it was announced that the series had been renewed for a third season and featured a different staff than previous seasons. It was animated by Yumeta Company and Maru Animation, and directed by Koichi Hatsumi, with Yasuyuki Mutō serving as the main writer, and Yōko Tanabe and Hisashi Kawashima as new character designers. Yasuharu Takanashi returned to compose the music. The season premiered on December 10, 2025. The opening theme is "Dead or Alive", performed by Glay, while the ending theme is "Last Breath, Last Record", performed by Saori Hayami.

In June 2026, it was announced that the series had been renewed for a fourth season.

== Reception ==
By March 2021, the manga had over 6 million copies in circulation. By June 2021, the manga had over 7 million copies in circulation. By December 2021, the manga had over 9 million copies in circulation. The manga placed sixth in Rakuten Kobo's second E-book Award in the "Long Seller Comic" category in 2024.

Record of Ragnarok ranked fifth on Takarajimasha's Kono Manga ga Sugoi! 2019 ranking of Top 20 manga series for male readers. The series ranked fifth on the "Nationwide Bookstore Employees' Recommended Comics of 2018". It placed twelfth on the "Nationwide Bookstore Employees' Recommended Comics of 2020". In 2019, the manga ranked 20th on the fifth Next Manga Awards in the Print category.

In October 2020, Rajan Zed, the president of the Universal Society of Hinduism, made a statement addressed to Coamix, criticizing the depiction of Hindu deities in manga and urged the company "not to trivialize Lord Shiva and other highly revered Hindu gods and goddesses in its manga publications". The anime received backlash for its depiction of Shiva by a large group of Indian Americans, calling the series "highly disturbing to them" as it trivializes the deity. To avoid further criticism, Netflix altered the trailer to remove Shiva, and later removed the anime itself from its streaming library in India.

== See also ==
- Chiruran: Shinsengumi Requiem, another manga series written by Shinya Umemura
- Märchen Crown, another manga series illustrated by Azychika
