= Tsukasa Hojo =

Japanese manga artist

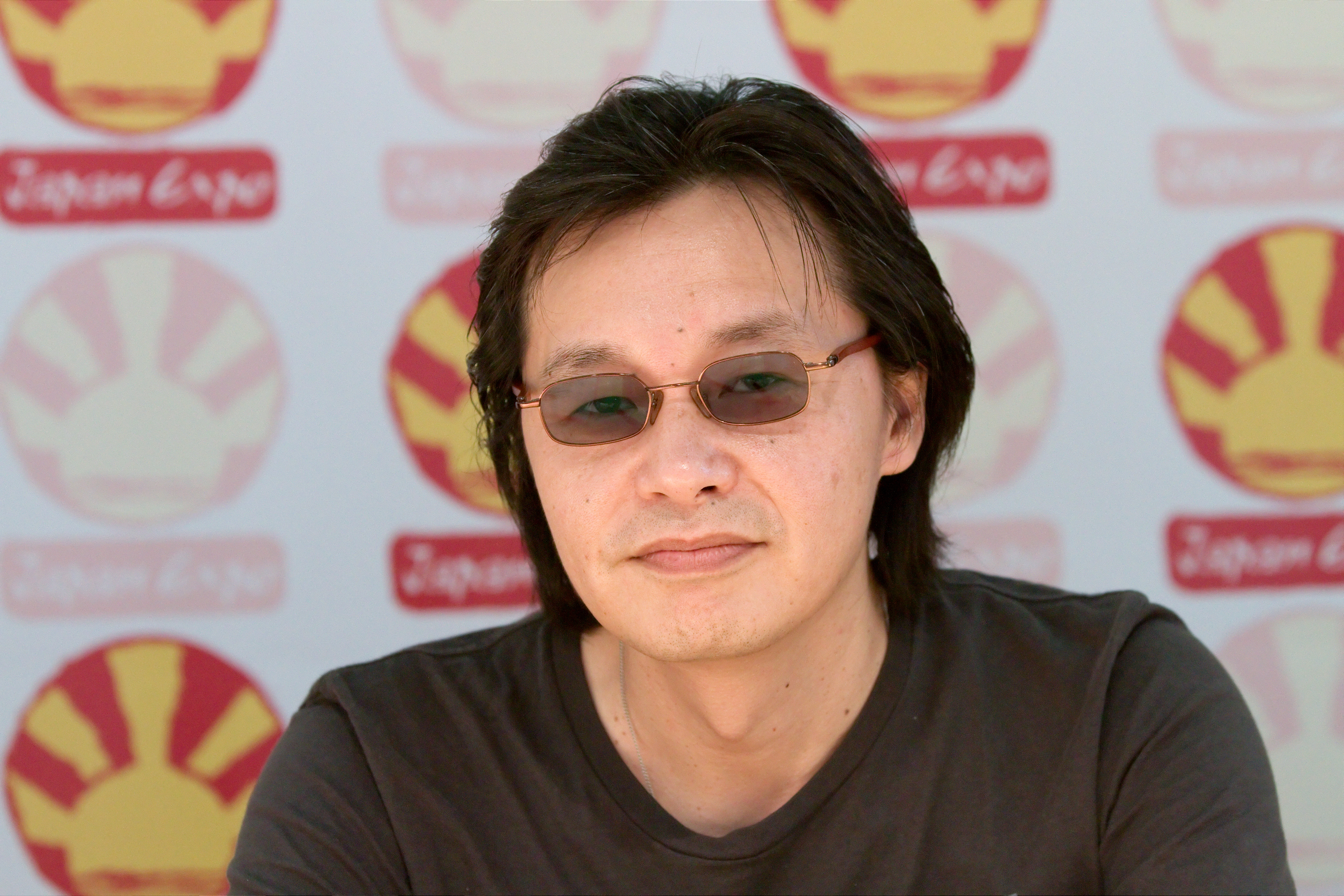
- Tsukasa Hojo at Japan Expo 2010
- Born: March 5, 1959 (age 67) Kokura, Kitakyushu, Japan
- Area: Manga artist
- Notable works: Cat's Eye; City Hunter

Tsukasa Hojo (Japanese: 北条 司, Hepburn: Hōjō Tsukasa; born March 5, 1959, in Kokura, Kitakyushu, Japan) is a Japanese manga artist. He studied technical design while still at Kyushu Sangyo University, where he began to draw manga. He worked on several one-shot stories before releasing his serialized works: Cat's Eye, City Hunter and Angel Heart.

After the success of Cat's Eye and City Hunter, Hojo went on to work on other series such as Family Compo, a slice-of-life comedy with transgender themes. His most recent series is Angel Heart, a spin–off of City Hunter set in an alternate universe. It was serialized in Weekly Comic Bunch from 2001 to 2010, when the magazine ceased publication. From 2010 to 2017, the series continued under the title Angel Heart 2nd Season in Monthly Comic Zenon. 30 collected volumes have been published so far.

Tsukasa Hojo is Takehiko Inoue's mentor. Inoue worked as an assistant to Hojo during the production of City Hunter. Hojo is also a long-time acquaintance of Fist of the North Star illustrator Tetsuo Hara, who was also one of the founders of Coamix. Hojo contributed to the production Fist of the North Star: The Legends of the True Savior film series by designing the character of Reina.

He was honor guest of the eleventh French Japan Expo which was held in July 2010. Hojo is scheduled to be the Manga Guest of Honor at Japan Expo 2023.

== Works ==
Title	Publication	Date
Space Angel	Weekly Shōnen Jump	1979
Ore wa Otoko Da!	Weekly Shōnen Jump	August 1980
三級刑事	Weekly Shōnen Jump	January 1981
Cat's ♡ Eye (キャッツ♡アイ)	Weekly Shōnen Jump	1981 Issue 29
Cat's Eye (キャッツアイ)	Weekly Shōnen Jump	1981 Issue 40 – 1984 Issue 44
Space Angel	Weekly Shōnen Jump	1982 Issue 16
City Hunter XYZ	Weekly Shōnen Jump	1983 Issue 18
City Hunter Double Edge	Weekly Shōnen Jump	1984 Issue 2
Cat's Eye	Weekly Shōnen Jump	1985 Issue 6
City Hunter (シティーハンター)	Weekly Shōnen Jump	1985 Issue 13
ねこまんまお変わり♡	Weekly Shōnen Jump	1986 Issue 6
Splash!	Weekly Shōnen Jump	April 1987
Splash! 2	Weekly Shōnen Jump	June 1987
Tenshi no Okurimono (天使の贈りもの)	Weekly Shōnen Jump	1988 Issue 34
Splash! 3	Super Jump	November 1988
Splash! 4	Super Jump	April 1989
Taxi Driver	Weekly Shōnen Jump	1990 Issue 6
Komorebi no Moto de (こもれ陽の下で..., Under the Dapple Shade)	Weekly Shōnen Jump	1993–1994
Rash!!	Weekly Shōnen Jump	1994–1995
Family Compo (ファミリー・コンポ)	Manga Allman	1996–2000
Angel Heart (エンジェル・ハート)	Weekly Comic Bunch	2001–2010
Angel Heart 2nd Season (エンジェル・ハート 2ndシーズン)	Monthly Comic Zenon	2010–2017

== See also ==
- City Hunter (1987 TV series)
- City Hunter (2024 film)
