= Cat's Eye (manga) =

Japanese manga series by Tsukasa Hojo

- Eighth tankōbon volume cover, featuring the three Kisugi sisters (from left to right) Ai, Rui, and Hitomi

キャッツ アイ (Kyattsu Ai)
- Genre: Action; Crime; Mystery
- Manga
- Written by: Tsukasa Hojo
- Published by: Shueisha
- English publisher: Coamix (digital); NA: Abrams ComicArts
- Imprint: Jump Comics
- Magazine: Weekly Shōnen Jump
- Original run: September 14, 1981 – January 22, 1985
- Volumes: 18
- Anime television series
- Directed by: Yoshio Takeuchi
- Produced by: Norio Hatsukawa; Shunzo Kato
- Written by: Junichi Iioka
- Music by: Kazuo Otani
- Studio: Tokyo Movie Shinsha
- Licensed by: NA: Nozomi Entertainment (former); Discotek Media (current)
- Original network: NNS (NTV)
- English network: US: Right Stuf Inc.; ImaginAsian (former)
- Original run: July 11, 1983 – March 26, 1984
- Episodes: 36
- Anime television series

Cat's Eye 2
- Directed by: Kenji Kodama
- Produced by: Norio Hatsukawa; Shunzo Kato
- Written by: Junichi Iioka
- Music by: Kazuo Otani
- Studio: Tokyo Movie Shinsha
- Licensed by: NA: Nozomi Entertainment (former); Discotek Media (current)
- Original network: NNS (NTV)
- Original run: October 8, 1984 – July 8, 1985
- Episodes: 37
- Manga

Cat's Eyes
- Written by: Sakura Nakameguro
- Illustrated by: Shingo Asai
- Published by: Tokuma Shoten
- Magazine: Monthly Comic Zenon
- Original run: October 25, 2010 – January 25, 2014
- Volumes: 8
- Original net animation
- Directed by: Yoshifumi Sueda
- Written by: Hayashi Mori
- Music by: Yuki Hayashi
- Studio: Liden Films
- Licensed by: Disney Platform Distribution
- Released: September 26, 2025 – January 30, 2026
- Episodes: 12
- Other
- Cat's Eye (1997); Lupin the 3rd vs. Cat's Eye (2023); Cat's Eyes (2024–present)
- icon

Cat's Eye (Japanese: キャッツ♥アイ, Hepburn: Kyattsu Ai; stylized as CAT'S♥EYE) is a Japanese manga series written and illustrated by Tsukasa Hojo. It was serialized in Shueisha's shōnen manga magazine Weekly Shōnen Jump from 1981 to 1985, with its chapters collected in 18 tankōbon volumes. The story follows the adventures of the three Kisugi sisters—Hitomi, Rui, and Ai, who are formidable art thieves trying to collect all the works belonging to their missing father.

The manga was made into a televised anime series of the same name originally broadcast in 1983 to 1984 on Nippon Television, with a second season in 1985. It has also received three live-action adaptations; a TV film in 1988, a theatrical film in 1997, and a French TV series since 2024. A crossover original net animation (ONA) with Lupin III produced by TMS Entertainment, titled Lupin the 3rd vs. Cat's Eye, premiered on Amazon Prime Video in 2023. A new ONA adaptation produced by Liden Films premiered on Disney+ and Hulu in 2025.

Cat's Eye is one of Weekly Shōnen Jump's best-selling manga series of all time, with over 20 million copies sold.

== Plot ==
Hitomi Kisugi, along with her older sister Rui and her younger sister Ai, run a café called "Cat's Eye" in Tokyo. The sisters lead a double life as a trio of highly skilled art thieves, stealing works of art which primarily belonged to their long-missing father, Michael Heinz, who was a famous art collector during the Nazi regime. Hitomi's fiancé is Toshio Utsumi, a clumsy young police officer who is investigating the Cat's Eye case. Despite being a frequent visitor to the café he is unaware of the double life of the girls. Hitomi regularly informs the police in advance about her next job using a signature "Cat's Eye" calling card, and then uses Toshio's research about the security surrounding the target to help plan the job.

At the end of the series, Heinz leaves a note for his daughters stating that he cannot reveal himself yet because the mafia may kill him, but he may appear in five years' time. However, the "Heinz" turns out to be the sisters' treacherous uncle Cranaff, who betrayed Michael years earlier. After losing a final bet to Cat's Eye, Cranaff decides to atone for his sin by setting fire to the museum, killing himself. Hitomi eventually admits to Toshio that she is part of Cat's Eye and flees before he can arrest her. Toshio vows to track her down, attempting to "arrest" Hitomi at the airport with a wedding ring. He resigns from the police force and travels to America to find Hitomi, but finds that she has lost her memory due to viral meningitis. Toshio spends time with her until her memories come back, and the two rekindle their relationship.

== Characters ==
Hitomi Kisugi (来生 瞳, Kisugi Hitomi)
Voiced by: Keiko Toda (TV series), Mikako Komatsu (2025 ONA) (Japanese); Alexis Tipton (City Hunter: Shinjuku Private Eyes), Alicyn Packard (Lupin the 3rd vs. Cat's Eye), Erin Yvette (2025 ONA) (English)
Hitomi is the second daughter of Michael Heinz and the primary operative of the Cat's Eye team, earning her the distinct title of the Cat's Eye. A highly skilled athlete, she excels in horseback riding, safe cracking, and acrobatics, effortlessly performing complex maneuvers. Her agility allows her to escape restraints with ease, and she demonstrates proficiency in martial arts. Charming, clever, and compassionate, Hitomi is also adept at disguise and fluent in multiple languages.
Rui Kisugi (来生 泪, Kisugi Rui)
Voiced by: Toshiko Fujita (TV series), Keiko Toda (City Hunter: Shinjuku Private Eyes), Rika Fukami (Lupin the 3rd vs. Cat's Eye, City Hunter The Movie: Angel Dust), Ami Koshimizu (2025 ONA) (Japanese); Dawn M. Bennett (City Hunter: Shinjuku Private Eyes), Cristina Vee (Lupin the 3rd vs. Cat's Eye), Alejandra Reynoso (2025 ONA) (English)
Rui is Hitomi's elegant and sophisticated older sister, serving as the leader and strategist of the Cat's Eye team. With striking beauty and sharp intellect, she excels in planning operations and adapting to unpredictable situations. A highly skilled athlete, she is proficient in car racing, hang gliding, parachuting, helicopter piloting, martial arts, and scuba diving. Adept at disguise and fluent in multiple languages, including English, French, and German, she can also read lips. As the only sister with clear memories of their parents, Rui assumes a protective, maternal role toward Hitomi and their younger sister.
Ai Kisugi (来生 愛, Kisugi Ai)
Voiced by: Chika Sakamoto (TV series), Yumiri Hanamori (2025 ONA) (Japanese); Megan Shipman (City Hunter: Shinjuku Private Eyes), Deneen Melody (Lupin the 3rd vs. Cat's Eye), Ari Thrash (2025 ONA) (English)
Ai, the youngest of the trio, possesses a tomboyish personality and exceptional intelligence, specializing in mechanics, computer programming, and engineering. She designs various gadgets to assist her sisters' heists. Though less physically adept than them, she skillfully operates getaway vehicles, including helicopters, gyrocopters, and motorcycles, compensating with agility. A typical high school student, she often daydreams about romance and owns a tabby kitten named Tiger.
Toshio Utsumi (内海 俊夫, Utsumi Toshio)
Voiced by: Yoshito Yasuhara (TV series), Takuya Satō (2025 ONA) (Japanese); Ryan Colt Levy (Lupin the 3rd vs. Cat's Eye), Alex Bankier (2025 ONA) (English)
Toshio is Hitomi's high school sweetheart and a detective at Tokyo's Inunaki ("Crying Dog") District Police Station. Determined to capture Cat's Eye before marrying Hitomi, he has already proposed to her. Though clumsy and occasionally gullible, his persistence earns his supervisors' respect. Preferring hand-to-hand combat over firearms, he frequently clashes with his chief. His attraction to beautiful women, particularly blondes, often provokes Hitomi's jealousy.
Boss (課長, Kacho)
Voiced by: Kenji Utsumi (TV series)
Toshio's unnamed Section Chief heads the Detective Division at Inunaki Precinct. Known only by his title, he frequently clashes with Toshio over the Cat's Eye case, routinely reprimanding him for his investigative methods.
Mitsuko Asatani (浅谷 光子, Asatani Mitsuko)
Voiced by: Yoshiko Sakakibara (TV series), Yoko Hikasa (2025 ONA)
Asatani is a special investigator from Tokyo Police Headquarters assigned to the Cat's Eye case. A skilled markswoman who won the All-Japan Air Pistol Championships, she holds a fourth-degree black belt in karate and second-degree in judo, making her physically comparable to Hitomi. Though highly intelligent and perceptive—being the first to suspect Hitomi's identity—she fails to gather conclusive evidence. Her poor eyesight requires constant use of prescription glasses. The manga reveals her unspoken affection for Toshio, which irritates Hitomi.
Michael Heinz (ミケール・ハインツ)
Voiced by: Ryōtarō Okiayu (2025 ONA)
Michael Heinz was an artistic prodigy in 1930s Germany who began assembling his renowned collection by age ten, including paintings, sculptures, and handcrafted musical instruments. Fleeing Nazi persecution, he settled in Japan and married, fathering three daughters. After disappearing in the United States, his dispersed collection became targeted by thieves called "Cat's Eye"—actually his grown daughters Rui, Hitomi, and Ai, who sought clues to his whereabouts. Their search ultimately reveals Heinz was betrayed by his twin brother Cranaff (クラナッフ, Kuranaffu), who assumed his identity. This discovery leads the sisters to abandon their Cat's Eye operations.
Sadatsugu Nagaishi (永石 定嗣, Nagaishi Sadatsugu)
Voiced by: Tamio Ōki (TV series), Mugihito (Lupin the 3rd vs. Cat's Eye)
Nagaishi is a trusted family friend who assists the Kisugi sisters with their heists, supplying information and specialized equipment beyond what Ai can provide. Though his background remains mysterious, his military expertise suggests possible armed forces experience.
Kazumi (和美)
Voiced by: Chiyoko Kawashima (TV series)
Kazumi, a classmate of Ai's, accidentally photographs Hitomi during a moon photography session. Recognizing a resemblance to Cat's Eye, she investigates further and shares her suspicions with Asatani. Kazumi then stays overnight at the Kisugi home under false pretenses to gather evidence. The sisters cleverly maintain their alibi by making Hitomi appear present during Cat's Eye's next operation.
Masato Kamiya (神谷 真人, Kamiya Masato)
Voiced by: Katsuyuki Konishi (2025 ONA)
A gentlemen thief who operates as a freelance journalist during the day. He is known as "The Mouse" and considers himself a rival to Cat's Eye. He is well aware of the Kisugi sisters' double life as Cat's Eye, but does not reveal their identities as it could also reveal his crimes as well.

== Media ==
=== Manga ===
Tsukasa Hojo's Cat's Eye was serialized in Weekly Shōnen Jump from September 14, 1981, to October 15, 1984, (an additional chapter was published on January 22, 1985) with the chapters collected in 18 tankōbon volumes by Shueisha. It was later re-released as 10 aizōban volumes in 1994, 10 bunkoban volumes in 1996, and 15 kanzenban volumes between 2005 and 2006. The kanzenban release was published by Tokuma Shoten.

Coamix started publishing the manga digitally in English on the Imagineer's MangaHotto (MangaHot) digital platform in July 2024. In April 2025, Abrams ComicArts announced that it will start releasing the manga in an omnibus edition in print under its Kana imprint on September 9 of the same year. Kana is using a new English translation for the release.

A remake manga of the series written by Sakura Nakameguro and drawn by Shingo Asai, also titled Cat's Eye (キャッツ・愛, Kyattsu Ai) ("Eye" was spelled with the kanji for "love"; sometimes referred as Cat's Eyes), began publication in the debut issue of Tokuma Shoten's Monthly Comic Zenon anthology, which was published on October 25, 2010. It was serialized until January 25, 2014, and its chapters were collected in eight tankōbon volumes.

=== Other books ===
In December 1996, a novel by Hideo Takayashiki was published.

On March 22, 2000, Parrot: Blessed Person – Tsukasa Hōjō Short Story Collection (Parrot 幸福の人—北条司短編集, Parotto Kōfuku no Hito Hōjō Tsukasa Tanpenshū) was published. It was written by Tsukasa Hojo with digital work by Futoshi Nagata.

=== Anime ===
==== 1983–85 series ====
Cat's Eye was adapted into an anime series by Tokyo Movie Shinsha and directed by Yoshio Takeuchi. 36 episodes were broadcast from July 11, 1983, to March 26, 1984. A second series was later produced that ran for 37 episodes from October 8, 1984, to July 8, 1985.

In 2007, ImaginAsian broadcast the first season of the first anime on ImaginAsian TV, and then gave the first half of the series its first North American home video release. Right Stuf Inc. announced that they licensed the entire series in 2013 and would release it on DVD under their Nozomi label. The entire anime series was released in North American on two DVDs in July and November 2014. In April 2019, it was announced that the Right Stuf license expired. In December 2021, Discotek Media announced the rights to the anime series for release on Blu-ray, releasing it on two sets on April 26 and November 29, 2022.

==== 2025–26 series ====
On November 21, 2024, a new original net animation (ONA) adaptation was announced. The series was produced by Liden Films and directed by Yoshifumi Sueda, with scripts written by Hayashi Mori, characters designed by Yosuke Yabumoto who also served as chief animation director, and music composed by Yuki Hayashi. It streamed on Disney+ under the Star Originals brand as a worldwide exclusive; the first six episodes were released weekly from September 26 to October 31, 2025, while the remaining six were released from December 26, 2025, to January 30, 2026.

The series is streaming on Hulu in the United States. Starting on October 8, 2025, the series' worldwide release outside of Japan was moved following Star's rebrand as Hulu.

==== Films ====
In 2019, the Kisugi sisters appeared in the animated film City Hunter: Shinjuku Private Eyes as a crossover with City Hunter. Chika Sakamoto and Keiko Toda reprised their respective roles from the 1980s anime series as Ai and Hitomi, with Toda also voicing Rui due Toshiko Fujita's death in 2018.

In September 2022, TMS Entertainment announced a CGI-based crossover anime with Lupin III: Lupin the 3rd vs. Cat's Eye. The anime was directed by Kōbun Shizuno and Hiroyuki Seshita, with Keisuke Ide serving as assistant director, Shūji Kuzuhara writing the scripts, Yuji Ohno and Kazuo Otani composing the music, and Haruhisa Nakata and Junko Yamanaka designing the characters. Keiko Toda reprised her role of Hitomi Kisugi. On December 6, 2022, it was revealed that Chika Sakamoto and Yoshito Yasuhara would reprise their respective roles as Ai and Toshio, with Rika Fukami taking over the role of Rui. The anime premiered on Amazon Prime Video as a worldwide exclusive on January 27, 2023.

In 2023, the Kisugi sisters appeared in the animated film City Hunter: Angel Dust, with Keiko Toda, Rika Fukami, and Chika Sakamoto reprising their roles.

=== Live-action film ===
On August 27, 1997, the live-action movie adaptation Cat's Eye was released. The film is directed by Kaizo Hayashi and starring Yuki Uchida and Norika Fujiwara.

=== Live-action series ===
On March 9, 2023, the newspaper Le Parisien reported that a French live-action drama version of the series was in development for TF1 and would be directed by Alexandre Laurent. The series is produced by Big Band Story and TF1 Production in association with Amazon Prime Video for the first season, and Disney+ for the second season. The series, set in Paris, stars Camille Lou, Constance Labbé, and Claire Romain as the sisters, and took the names used for the characters in the French dubbing of the 1983 anime series, which already used French names despite taking place in Japan. The first season, which consists of eight 49–59 minutes episodes, premiered in France on TF1 on November 11, 2024, and in select regions on December 18 on Amazon Prime Video.

On February 13, 2025, TF1 announced that the series was renewed for a second season, which premiered on October 12, 2026, and was later released on Hulu and Disney+'s Hulu hub.

== Reception ==
The Cat's Eye manga has had over 20 million copies in circulation.

Allen Moody of THEM Anime Reviews gave the anime adaptation a rating of 3 out of 5 stars. He praised the story and how the heists were set up, comparing it to the Mission: Impossible TV series, however he noted that it gets very repetitive as the series progresses. He also handed out praise for the three main female leads and their character development, but criticized the poor treatment of the main male lead, Toshio. He also criticized the ending for not being as satisfying as the manga's, but over noted that "most of all, the oceans of guilt, and flashes of passion, that lurk just below the surface of the Hitomi/Toshio relationship, and very occasionally pop into view, are fascinating."

Rebecca Silverman of Anime News Network handed out a B rating for season one, and a C− rating for season two. She praised the first season for its animation, voice acting, character development, and story, but criticized the plot for being too repetitive and the soundtrack for being too grating after a while. For season two, she called it "campy fun", and praised the increased role for Ai, the voice acting, as well as the catchy ending theme. However, she criticized the plot for being too repetitive like the first season, the lack of progression in Toshio and Hitomi's relationship, reusing animation clips in most episodes, and an uncomfortable episode about the Holocaust.

== See also ==
- "Cat's Eye" (song)
