= Monthly Comic Zenon =

Japanese manga magazine

- Cover of the February 2013 issue of Monthly Comic Zenon, published by Tokuma Shoten on December 25, 2012
- Editor-in-chef: Ken Hanada
- Categories: Seinen manga
- Frequency: Monthly
- Publisher: Coamix (since 2020); Tokuma Shoten (2010–2020); North Stars Pictures (2010–2020)
- First issue: October 25, 2010 (December issue)
- Company: Coamix
- Country: Japan
- Based in: Tokyo
- Language: Japanese
- Website: comic-zenon.com

Monthly Comic Zenon (Japanese: 月刊コミックゼノン, Hepburn: Gekkan Komikku Zenon) is a Japanese monthly seinen manga anthology magazine published by Coamix. From 2010 to 2020, it was formerly published by North Stars Pictures and Tokuma Shoten. It was produced as a replacement for Weekly Comic Bunch, Coamix's previous manga anthology. The collected editions of their titles are published under the Zenon Comics imprint.

== Overview ==
After the drop of Shinchosha's Weekly Comic Bunch circulation numbers, Coamix, which edited the magazine, announced Bunch's discontinuation. Coamix marked August 27, 2010, as the day of Bunch's last release, and started to consider to launch a new magazine. In October 2010, Coamix announced a partnership with North Stars Pictures and Tokuma Shoten, stating that the new magazine Monthly Comic Zenon would debut on October 25, 2010. At the same time Shinchosha launched Monthly Comics @ Bunch, a replacement for Weekly Comic Bunch, but edited without Coamix's involvement. As a result, many of the manga artists from Bunch have been moved to Zenon.

The magazine's name is based on "Kanzeon Bosatsu" (観世音菩薩)—the Japanese name of bodhisattva Guanyin—, specifically the "Zeon" (世音) part, which means to "hear the voice of the worldwide". The "Z" from "Zenon" was chosen with the meaning of "ultimate" since it is the last letter from alphabet.

In order to approach more readers, Monthly Comic Zenon is published in both, print and digital editions. The website "Zenon Land" was launched, publishing the Zenon's manga series only for smartphones. A YouTube channel was created to disclose Zenon-related media. Also, "Cafe Zenon", a kissaten decorated with manga motifs, in Kichijōji, a neighborhood in the city of Musashino, Tokyo, was inaugurated on November 11, 2009.

To expand its range the magazine also promotes a "silent manga" contest; first, in 2011, it was a national competition. Starting from 2013, it became an international contest, in which no dialogues were necessary. Open for professional and amateurs, the focus of the judgment was the performance of the works through art rather than exposition. The judges were manga authors Tsukasa Hojo (City Hunter) and Tetsuo Hara (Fist of the North Star), then editor-in-chief Nobuhiko Horie and the magazine editorial team. The best five received prize awards while the top three had their works published in the magazine. The first international edition received 514 submissions from 53 countries, while in the second people from 65 countries submitted 609 works. Molico Ross, a winner of the domestic competition, wrote Nobo and Her? between 2012 and 2017, and Shinigami ni Datte, Ai wa Aru (published since 2017) is based on "Thirty and a Half Minutes", a work by the 4th international contest winner, Vietnamese female writer Snippy MJ.

In another action to expand its public, in August 2015, Coamix and The Silent Manga Audition Committee created a section called "Zenon International" on the contest website to publish the SMAC! Web Magazine. They announced plans to translate all the series and offer them for free on their site based on demand—which is based on the readers' vote. At first they made available Ikusa no Ko: Legend of Oda Nobunaga, Nobo and Her? and Arte, and in December Angel Heart became part of the catalog.

After a certain amount of chapters are serialized in the magazine they are collected into tankōbon format and published under the Zenon Comics imprint. Parallel to this label, there is Zenon Comics DX that only publishes titles former released by other publishers such as Tetsuo Hara's Cyber Blue (Weekly Shōnen Jump) and Kōkenryoku Ōryō Sōsakan Nakabō Rintarō (Bart 3230). This two titles composed Zenon Comics DX first line-up, while Zenon Comics one had Angel Heart: 2nd Season, Cat's Eye, Concierge Platinum, and Waraenu Warashi: 108 no Karma. Both imprints released its first titles on March 22, 2011. (Note: See the attached sources for Angel Heart: 2nd Season, Cat's Eye, Concierge Platinum, Waraenu Warashi: 108 no Karma Cyber Blue, and Kōkenryoku Ōryō Sōsakan Nakabō Rintarō.) The Zenon Comics level also publishes manga released on Zenon's sister magazine, Web Comic Zenyon (WEBコミックぜにょん). Published online since October 25, 2012, it is the home of series such as Hokuto no Ken: Ichigo Aji and Seikai Suru Kado: Aoi Haru to Railgun.

== List of works ==
Ongoing series are highlighted in light green.

Manga	First Issue	Last Issue	Author
Ikusa no Ko: Legend of Oda Nobunaga (いくさの子 織田三郎信長伝, Ikusa no Ko Oda Saburō Nobunaga-Den)	December 2010	September 2022	Tetsuo Hara, Seibō Kitahara
Angel Heart 2nd Season (ANGEL HEART 2ndシーズン, Enjeru Hāto Sekando Shīzun)	December 2010	July 2017	Tsukasa Hojo
DD Fist of the North Star (DD北斗の拳)	December 2010	August 2016	Kajio
Gifū Dōdō!! Naoe Kanetsugu: Maeda Keiji Sake Gatari (義風堂々!!直江兼続 -前田慶次酒語り-)	December 2010	March 2014	Tetsuo Hara, Nobuhiko Horie, Yūji Takemura
Papa wa Donkan-sama (パパは鈍感さま) (Note: It was subtitled Danna Ikumen-ka Project (旦那イクメン化計画, Danna Ikumen-ka Purojekuto) from its start to the fifth issue of 2012. From its sixth issue of 2012, it was published under the subtitle Kosodate Yori Dame Danna Sodate!? (子育てよりダメ旦那育て!?).)	December 2010	November 2012	Nao Sekine
Cat's Eye (キャッツ♥愛, Kyattsu Ai) (Note: The title only differs from the original title in Japanese; キャッツ♥アイ is the title of the first series, while this one is キャッツ♥愛. However, both are read as Cat's Eye in English.)	December 2010	March 2014	Tsukasa Hojo, Shin Asai, Sakura Nakameguro
Profiling of Fridge (冷蔵庫探偵, Reizōko Tantei)	December 2010	February 2012	Saemi Endō, Izumi Satō
Chiruran: Shinsengumi Requiem (ちるらん 新撰組鎮魂歌, Chiruran Shinsengumi Chinkon-ka)	December 2010	June 2023	Shinya Umemura, Eiji Hashimoto
Mandala Daladala (まんだらダラダラ, Mandara Daradara)	December 2010	May 2011	Kōji Matsuka, Haruki Oka
Concierge Platinum (コンシェルジュ プラチナム, Konsheruju Purachinamu)	December 2010	November 2014	Michihiko Fujiei, Hideyuki Ishizeki
Waraenu Warashi: 108 no Karma (笑えぬ童子 〜108の業〜, Waraenu Warashi: Hyakuhachi no Karuma)	December 2010	November 2011	Makoto Mano
Valientes: Date no Oni Katakura Kojūrō (バリエンテス 伊達の鬼 片倉小十郎, Barientesu Date no Oni Katakura Kojūrō)	December 2010	March 2012	Yoshiki Tanaka
Saibanchō! Koko wa Chōeki 4-Nen de Dōsu ka: Boku ni Shikei to Ieru no ka (裁判長!ここは懲役4年でどうすか ぼくに死刑と言えるのか)	December 2010	July 2012	Toro Kitao, Inusuke Matsubashi
Cyber Blue: Ushinawareta Kodomo-tachi (サイバーブルー 失われた子供たち, Saibā Burū Ushinawareta Kodomo-tachi)	January 2011	July 2012	Motoki Yoshihara, Tetsuo Hara
Haikin (拝金)	February 2011	October 2011	Shūji Takeya, Takafumi Horie
Internet Shopping Prince Yoshimi Ida (おとりよせ王子 飯田好実, Otoriyose Ōji Iida Yoshimi])	February 2011	July 2016	Shiho Takase
Konkatsu no Hanamichi (婚活の花道)	March 2011	May 2011	Ai Sakurakōji
Saibanchō! Boku no Otōto Chōeki 4-nen de Dōsuka (裁判長!ぼくの弟懲役4年でどうすか)	March 2011	July 2011	Toro Kitao and Inusuke Matsubashi
The Commander in Chief Koichiro Sakuraba (内閣総理大臣 桜庭皇一郎, Komandā in Chīfu Sakuraba Koichirō)	July 2011	November 2012	Ryuji Tsugihara, Hiroshi Kanai, and Mitsuhiro Sera
Wakakozake (ワカコ酒)	September 2011	Ongoing	Chie Shinkyu
Ten-pai! (てんぱいっ!)	December 2012	March 2013	KeiYu
Itsuya-san (夜さん)	January 2012	November 2013	Mizu Sahara
Kū Neru Futari Sumu Futari (喰う寝るふたり 住むふたり)	April 2012	December 2014	Kinoko Higurashi
Hatsukoi: Pioneers (ハツコイ〜開拓者たち〜, Hatsukoi Kaitakusha-tachi)	April 2012	August 2012	Mitsuru Ōsaki
Nobo and Her? (のぼさんとカノジョ?, Nobo-san to Kanojo?)	June 2012	October 2017	Molico Ross
Kimi ni Tomodachi ga Dekiru Made. (キミにともだちができるまで。)	June 2012	March 2015	Shin Hotani
Kanayago (カナヤゴ)	September 2012	September 2013	Yū Hikasa
Cross Battlers: CyberBlue the Last Stand (クロスバトラーズ CyberBlue the Last Stand, Kurosu Batorāzu Saibā Burū za Rasuto Sutando)	December 2012	January 2014	Motoki Yoshihara and Tetsuo Hara
The Youth of Manga School (漫画専門学校生の青春, Manga Senmon Gakkō-sei no Seishun)	December 2012	November 2015	Kotaro Yamada and Ryoichi Yokoyama
Kinyoku no Garda: Nanto Gosha Sei Zenshi (金翼のガルダ〜南斗五車星前史〜, Kinyoku no Garuda Nanto Gosha Sei Zenshi)	April 2013	August 2013	Yoshiji Yamaguchi, Buronson and Tetsuo Hara
Watashi no Kare wa Shigoto ga Dekinai (私の彼は仕事ができない)	April 2013	January 2015	Kanan Yamada
Bakudan Ōji Dynamite (爆弾王子ダイナマイト, Bakudan Ōji Dainamaito)	March 2013	January 2014	Mon Shimizu
Back to the Hero (バック・トゥ・ザ・ヒーロー, Bakku to za Hiro)	July 2013	December 2013	Hōzuki
Genocider (ジェノサイダー, Jenosaidā)	September 2013	October 2015	Takahiro Akiyoshi and Maya Miyazaki
Sō Kakusei no Nova (双覚醒のノヴァ, Sō Kakusei no Noba)	September 2013	February 2014	Izumi Urata
Hanakaku: The Last Girl Standing (ハナカク-The Last Girl Standing-, Hanakaku za Rasuto Gāru Sutandingu)	October 2013	September 2015	Katsunori Matsui
Gifū Dōdō!! The Tactician of Wind: Kuroda Kanbei (義風堂々!! 疾風の軍師 -黒田官兵衛-, Gifū Dōdō!! Kaze no Gunshi Kuroda Kanbei)	November 2013	February 2017	Toshiaki Yamada, Tetsuo Hara, Nobuhiko Horie and Hiroyuki Yatsu
Detective Appli (探偵アプリ, Tantei Apuri)	November 2013	April 2014	Yū Sugimoto
Mononoke: Umibōzu (モノノ怪 -海坊主-)	November 2013	January 2015	Yaeko Ninagawa
Arte (アルテ, Arute)	December 2013	Ongoing	Kei Ōkubo
Basketmono (籠球者, Basukemono)	December 2013	May 2014	Hirofumi Takezoe
The Mermaid Prince (人魚の王子さま 〜マーメイド・プリンス〜, Ningyo no Ōji-sama ~Māmeido Purinsu~)	January 2014	December 2015	Yuana Kazumi
Zero no Shiniki (零の神域)	February 2014	February 2015	Hana Shinohara
Koishikarikeru (恋しかりける)	April 2014	September 2014	Rio Misumi
Gifū Dōdō!! Naoe Kanetsugu: Maeda Keiji Hana Gatari (義風堂々!!直江兼続 -前田慶次花語り-)	May 2014	December 2018	Tetsuo Hara, Nobuhiko Horie, and Masato Deguchi
Oda Shinamon Nobunaga (織田シナモン信長)	June 2014	October 2021	Una Megurogawa
Arte Tokubetsu-hen (アルテ 特別編)	October 2014	March 2015	Kei Ōkubo
Good Morning's and Good Night's (おはようとかおやすみとか, Ohayō Toka Oyasumi Toka)	June 2014	June 2017	Machita
Forensics Girl Hayama-san (鑑識女子の葉山さん, Kanshiki Joshi no Hayama-san)	June 2014	August 2014	Izumi Sato
Rainy Sometimes Bochan (雨ときどきボーちゃん, Ame Tokidoki Bō-chan)	August 2014	April 2015	Saya Usato
Onna to Hanashitai (おんなと話したいっ☆彡)	September 2014	November 2014	Hyper Wanabee (Takashi Yoshida)
Hana Musubi: Power of the Wonderful Flower (花むすび, Hana Musubi)	October 2014	March 2015	Subaru
Suzuki Just Wants a Quiet Life (スズキさんはただ静かに暮らしたい, Suzuki-san wa Tada Shizuka ni Kurashitai)	November 2014	April 2016	Hirohisa Sato
Do-do-ma (ドードーマ, Dōdōma)	December 2014	February 2016	Jun Shiraishi
Granny Girl Hinata-chan (老女的少女ひなたちゃん, Obaāchan Shōjo Hinata-chan)	December 2014	June 2022	Asa Kuwayoshi
Concierge Imperial (コンシェルジュ インペリアル, Konsheruju Inperiaru)	January 2015	November 2017	Michihiko Tōei and Hideyuki Ishizeki
Hakoniwa and Papillon (箱庭とパピヨン, Hakoniwa to Papiyon)	April 2015	August 2015	Saki Akamura
Delicious Foods, Delicious Faces – Narusawa-kun Loves Scrumptious Looks (鳴沢くんはおいしい顔に恋してる, Narusawa-kun wa Oishī Kao ni Koishiteru)	May 2015	August 2017	Rei Yamada
Mononoke: Zashikiwarashi (モノノ怪 -座敷童子-)	May 2015	November 2015	Yaeko Ninagawa
Tokyo Share Story (東京シェアストーリ, Tōkyō Shea Sutōrī)	June 2015	May 2016	Rikeo Tada and Motoko Takahashi
Tabemono Kemono (たべものけもの)	July 2015	February 2016	Akamaru Enomoto
Aragami (アラガミ)	August 2015	December 2015	Yūshi Hashimoto
Konpeitō no Hanayome (金平糖の花嫁)	September 2015	February 2016	Satono Okazaki
Shiawase no Popochi (しあわせのポポチ)	November 2015	October 2016	Saya Usato
Grendel: A Tale of the World Without Dragons (グレンデル, Gurenderu)	December 2015	July 2017	Mako Oikawa
Evil Star and Silly Goddess (疫病神とバカ女神, Yakubyōgami to Baka Megami)	January 2016	December 2016	Takuya Mori
Nishi Ogikubo Run Through (西荻窪ランスルー)	February 2016	January 2018	Ringo Yuki
Trace: Kasōken Hōi Kenkyūin no Tsuisō (トレース 科捜研法医研究員の追想, Torēsu: Kasōken Hōi Kenkyūin no Tsuisō)	March 2016	April 2023	Kei Koga
Meshinuma (めしぬま。)	March 2016	Ongoing	Amida Muku
Bungo Act (文豪アクト)	April 2016	February 2017	Fukutaro Masaki
Mononoke: Nue (モノノ怪 -鵺-)	May 2016	November 2016	Yaeko Ninagawa
Chiruran: Nibun no Ichi (ちるらん にぶんの壱)	July 2016	January 2018	Shinya Umemura and Eiji Hashimoto
Marion, la fille du cinq-centenaire (五百年目のマリオン, Gohyakunenme no Marion)	August 2016	November 2018	Yuu Hikasa
Kasuka no Chō Nibun no Ichi Chōme Tantei Jimusho (幽乃町1/2丁目探偵事務所)	September 2016	October 2019	Izumi Urata
Takaoka's Memo on Imaginative Accounting (高岡さんの妄想経理メモ, Takaoka-san no Mōsō Keiri Memo)	October 2016	One-shot	Pikomaro
Backstage! (バックステージ!, Bakkusutēji)	November 2016	November 2017 (Note: Transferred to Web Comic Zenyon.)	Okushou, Niimaruyuu
Gas Masquerade of Miasma (瘴気のガスマスカレイド, Shōki no Gasu Masukareido)	December 2016	February 2018	Yoshiki Tanaka, Mizuki Mizushiro
Fumino-san no Bungu na Nichijō (文野さんの文具な日常)	December 2016	September 2019	Akamaru Enomoto
Shiga Hime (屍牙姫)	January 2017	May 2019	Hirohisa Sato
Yano Nanako, Hakkyū o Pu: Take Me Out to the Stadium (矢野七菜子、白球を追う。, Yano Nanako, Hakkyū o Pu.)	February 2017	April 2018	Tokihiko Tamaru
Sasakawa-san Chi no Aineko Shiro (笹川さん家の愛猫シロウ)	April 2017	September 2017	Ema Saegusa
A Side Character's Love Story (モブ子の恋, Mobuko no Ko)	May 2017	September 2018 (Note: Transferred to Comic Tatan.)	Akane Tamura
Mononoke: Noppera-bō (モノノ怪-のっぺらぼう-)	May 2017	November 2017	Yaeko Ninagawa
Hiiro no Bunraku (火色の文楽)	June 2017	October 2018	Komao Kita
Hakoniwa no Toriko (箱庭の虜)	June 2017	One-shot	Mizu Sahara
Arthur Bright (アーサーブライト, Āsā Buraito)	July 2017	April 2018	Kairi Shimotsuki
Yokozuna Haō Densetsu: Kiseno Sato (横綱覇王伝説 稀勢の里)	August 2017	October 2017	Toshiaki Yamada
Surfingman (サーフィングマン, Sāfingu Man)	August 2017	July 2018	Haruto Umezawa
Kyō Kara City Hunter (今日からシティハンター)	July 2017	Ongoing	Sokura Nijiki
Watashi to Watashi (私と私)	October 2017	One-shot	Mizu Sahara
Shinigami ni Datte, Ai wa Aru (死神にだって、愛はある。)	November 2017	October 2018	Izumi Urata, Makiko Yoshida
Sōten no Ken: Regenesis (蒼天の拳 リジェネシス, Sōten no Ken Rijeneshisu)	December 2017	October 2025	Hiroyuki Yatsu, Hideki Tsuji
Record of Ragnarok (終末のワルキューレ, Shūmatsu no Warukyūre)	January 2018	Ongoing	Azychika, Shinya Umemura, Takumi Fukui
Kono Machi Kinema (コノマチキネマ)	February 2018	June 2019	Fujiko Segawa
Mōryō Shōjo (魍魎少女)	March 2018	October 2021	Jun Shiraishi
A Tail's Tale (尾かしら付き。, Okashiratsuki)	May 2018	July 2021	Mizu Sahara
Haru to Ao no Obentōbako (ハルとアオのお弁当箱)	May 2018	August 2020 (Note: Transferred to Comic Tatan.)	Machita
Mononoke: Bakeneko (モノノ怪 -化猫-)	May 2018	September 2019	Yaeko Ninagawa
Madori wa Dore ni suru? (間取りはどれにする？)	June 2018	January 2020	Jing Takao
Unsung Cinderella: Midori Aoi, The Hospital Pharmacist (アンサングシンデレラ 病院薬剤師 葵みどり, Ansangu Shinderera Byōin Yakuzaishi Aoi Midori)	July 2018	Ongoing	Arai Mamare
Antagonist (アンタゴニスト, Antagonisuto)	August 2018	April 2021	Michihiko Fujiei, Takayoshi Kuroda
Akaten no Kaijū (赤点のかいじゅう)	February 2019	February 2020	Hatsuki Sokawa
Maeda Keiji Kabuki Tabi (前田慶次 かぶき旅)	May 2019	Ongoing	Tetsuo Hara, Nobuhiko Horie, and Masato Deguchi
Shūmatsu no Valkyrie: Ryo Fu Hō Sen Hishōden (終末のワルキューレ異聞 呂布奉先飛将伝)	December 2019	January 2023	Takeo Ono
The War of Greedy Witches (魔女大戦 32人の異才の魔女は殺し合う, Majo Taisen 32-ri no Isai no Majo wa Koroshiau)	December 2020	Ongoing	Homura Kawamoto, Makoto Shiozuka
Uchi no Chīsana Jochū-san (うちのちいさな女中さん)	January 2021	Ongoing	Kana Osada
Saba & Buri (サバブリ)	January 2021	November 2022	MK
Kū Neru Futari Sumu Futari Zoku (喰う寝るふたり 住むふたり 続)	April 2021	July 2023	Kinoko Higurashi
Smoking Maid Romance (スモーキングメイドロマンス)	August 2021	October 2022	Sera Izumi
Buta no Fukushū (豚の復讐)	September 2021	Ongoing	Sau Nitō, Takayoshi Kuroda
Gals Can't Be Kind to Otaku!? (オタクに優しいギャルはいない!?, Otaku ni Yasashii Gyaru wa Inai!?)	October 2021	Ongoing	Norishiro-chan, Sakana Uozumi
Tengen Hero Wars (テンゲン英雄大戦, Tengen Eiyū Taisen)	October 2021	Ongoing	Kubaru Sakanoichi, Yasu Hiromoto
Hokuto no Ken Gaiden: Tensai Amiba no Isekai Haō Densetsu Isekai ni Ittemo Ore wa Tensai da!! Hm!? Machigatta kana... (北斗の拳外伝 天才アミバの異世界覇王伝説 異世界に行ってもおれは天才だ!! ん!? まちがったかな…)	December 2021	Ongoing	Nattō Gohan, Sokura Nishiki
Tokyo Cannabis Tokku: Taima-ō to Yobareta Otoko (東京カンナビス特区 大麻王と呼ばれた男, Tōkyō Kan'nabisu Tokku Taima-ō to Yobareta Otoko)	January 2022	Ongoing	Yuto Inai
Touken Ranbu Side Story Tale Of Ayakashi (刀剣乱舞 外伝 あやかし譚)	February 2022	Ongoing	Yaeko Ninagawa
Battlefront of the Great Powers (列強戦線, Rekkyō Sensen)	October 2023	Ongoing	Natsuko Uruma
