= Coamix =

Japanese manga and anime production company

Coamix Inc.

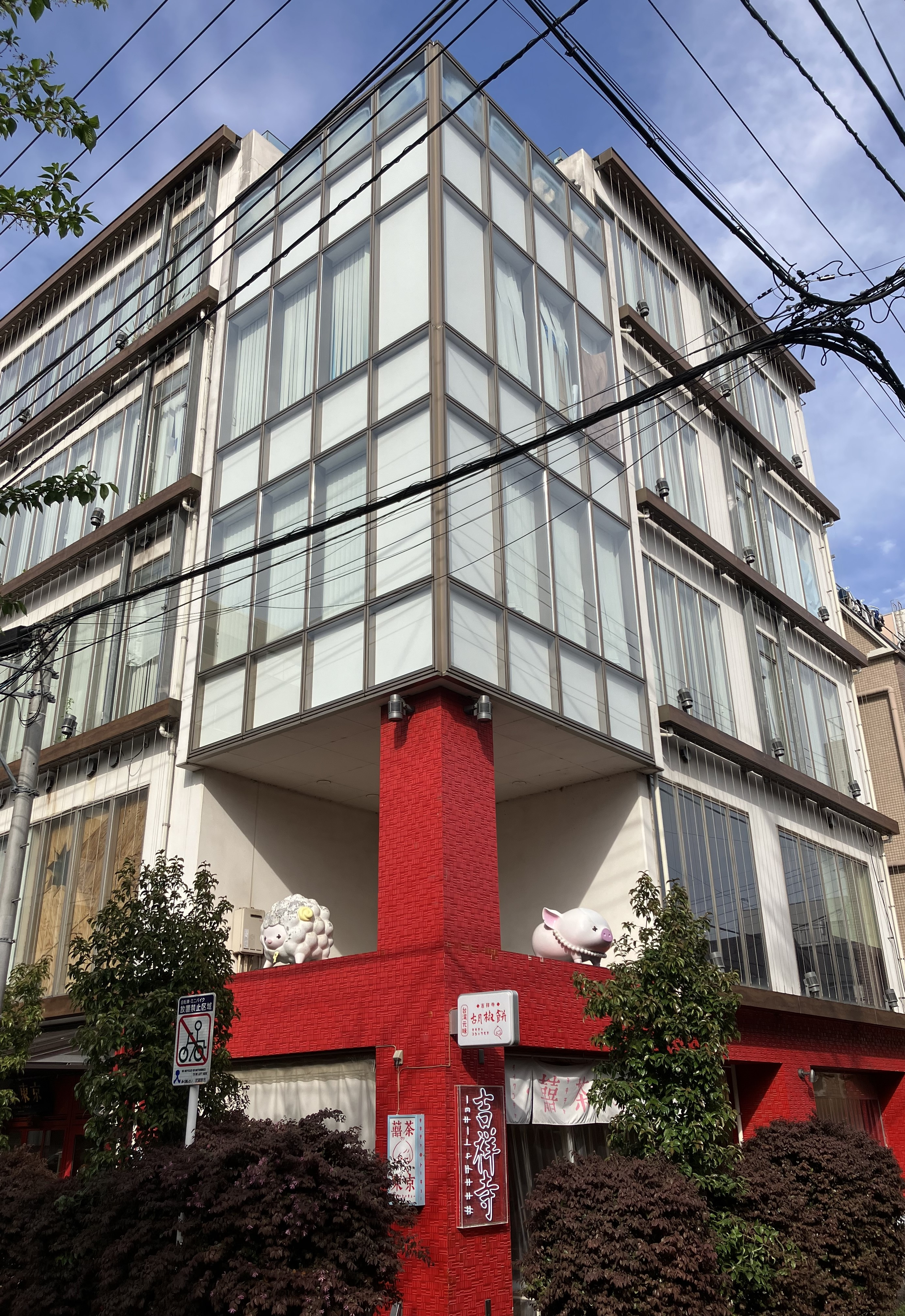
- Headquarters in Musashino, Tokyo
- Native name: 株式会社コアミックス
- Romanized name: Kabushiki-gaisha Koamikkusu
- Type: Private
- Industry: Publishing
- Founded: June 14, 2000
- Founders: Nobuhiko Horie; Tsukasa Hojo; Tetsuo Hara; Ryuji Tsugihara; Akira Kamiya
- Headquarters: Kichijōji, Musashino, Tokyo, Japan
- Key people: Nobuhiko Horie (CEO)
- Products: Manga; Magazines
- Website: www.coamix.co.jp

Coamix Inc. (株式会社コアミックス, Kabushiki-gaisha Koamikkusu) is a Japanese manga and anime production company headquartered in the Kichijoji Zizo Building (吉祥寺じぞうビル, Zizo Biru) in Kichijōji, Musashino, Tokyo. The company was previously partnered with Shinchosha until 2010 and then with Tokuma Shoten until Coamix began self-publishing in 2020.

The company was founded on June 4, 2000, by former Weekly Shōnen Jump editor-in-chief Nobuhiko Horie (who currently serves as the company's CEO), along with manga artists Tsukasa Hojo, Tetsuo Hara, and Ryuji Tsugihara, and voice actor Akira Kamiya, among others. The company published the manga anthology Weekly Comic Bunch, as well as the collected editions of their titles under the Bunch Comics imprint, from 2001 to 2010. In 2010, Monthly Comic Zenon was established to replace Bunch, and is currently under Coamix's responsibility.

Coamix was the parent company of the now-defunct North American manga publisher Gutsoon! Entertainment, which published Raijin Comics. A Japanese language edition of Raijin Comics was published by Coamix in Japan.

In addition to comic production, Coamix and related companies are currently engaged in multiple of related business, such as cafe and dining at their headquarters in Kichijoji. There is also a facility in the historical city of Kyoto in western Japan, which hosts Shincho-sa-ryo (信長茶寮), a theme based restaurant, devoted to the historical samurai hero Oda Nobunaga.

Since 2012, Coamix had been organizing "SILENT MANGA AUDITION", an open competition for Japanese style comics, without spoken dialogues. The organizer claims that utilizing graphics only for story telling, is a great test and training for manga creative skills. The winners of the event have made commercial debuts on Japanese comic magazines, with some gaining future prospects for series production. The event is currently in its 5th round, as of January 2016.
