= Crunchyroll Anime Award for Film of the Year =

- Awarded for: Best anime film of the previous year
- Country: United States; Japan
- First award: CoMix Wave Films – Your Name (2018)
- Currently held by: Ufotable – Demon Slayer: Kimetsu no Yaiba – The Movie: Infinity Castle (2026)

Highlights
- Most wins: Director: Makoto Shinkai / Haruo Sotozaki (2); Studio: CoMix Wave Films / Ufotable (2); Franchise: Demon Slayer: Kimetsu no Yaiba / Disaster trilogy (2)
- Most nominations: Director: Mamoru Hosoda / Naoko Yamada (3); Studio: MAPPA / Toei Animation (4); Franchise: Demon Slayer: Kimetsu no Yaiba / Disaster trilogy / Mononoke / My Hero Academia (2)
- Website: Crunchyroll Anime Awards

The Crunchyroll Anime Award for Film of the Year is a penultimate award given at the Crunchyroll Anime Awards since its second edition in 2018. It is given for the best anime film from the previous year. Winners are determined through a combined voting process by judges and public voting.

Makoto Shinkai and CoMix Wave Films's Your Name first won the award in 2018, which also awarded Suzume for the second time in 2023, the first film director and animation studio to win twice. MAPPA and Toei Animation holds their record for the most nominations, while the latter has the most nominations without a win with four. Bones Films' My Hero Academia, together with Ufotable's Demon Slayer: Kimetsu no Yaiba, Shinkai's Disaster trilogy, and Twin Engine's Mononoke, have the most nominations for a film franchise with two.

Mamoru Hosoda and Studio Chizu's Mirai is the first (and so far, only) film ever to rarely received nominations of Academy Award for Best Animated Feature and Crunchyroll Anime Award for Film of the Year at the same time. For his direction of Jujutsu Kaisen 0, Sunghoo Park is the first non-Japanese to win the award in 2022.

In the latest edition in 2026, Ufotable's Demon Slayer: Kimetsu no Yaiba – The Movie: Infinity Castle won the award.

== Winners and nominees ==
In the following list, the first titles listed in gold are the winners; those not in gold are nominees, which are listed in alphabetical order. The years given are those in which the ceremonies took place.

=== 2010s ===
Year	Anime	Director(s)	Studio(s)
2017 (2nd)
2017 (2nd)	Your Name	Makoto Shinkai	CoMix Wave Films
2017 (2nd)	A Silent Voice	Naoko Yamada	Kyoto Animation
2017 (2nd)	Fate/stay night: Heaven's Feel I. presage flower	Tomonori Sudō	Ufotable
2017 (2nd)	Girls und Panzer der Film	Tsutomu Mizushima	Actas
2017 (2nd)	In This Corner of the World	Sunao Katabuchi	MAPPA
2017 (2nd)	Kizumonogatari III: Reiketsu-hen	Akiyuki Shinbo (Note: Chief Director (総監督).); Tatsuya Oishi	Shaft
2018 (3rd)
2018 (3rd)	My Hero Academia: Two Heroes	Kenji Nagasaki	Bones
2018 (3rd)	Fireworks	Akiyuki Shinbo (Note: Chief Director (総監督).); Nobuyuki Takeuchi; Seimei Kidokoro (Note: Assistant Director (副監督). See the Shaft director credits legend.)	Shaft
2018 (3rd)	Liz and the Blue Bird	Naoko Yamada	Kyoto Animation
2018 (3rd)	Mazinger Z: Infinity	Junji Shimizu	Toei Animation
2018 (3rd)	Mirai	Mamoru Hosoda	Studio Chizu
2018 (3rd)	The Night Is Short, Walk On Girl	Masaaki Yuasa	Science SARU

=== 2020s ===
Year	Anime	Director(s)	Studio(s)
2021 (6th)
2021 (6th)	Demon Slayer: Kimetsu no Yaiba – The Movie: Mugen Train	Haruo Sotozaki	Ufotable
2021 (6th)	Belle	Mamoru Hosoda	Studio Chizu
2021 (6th)	Evangelion 3.0+1.0 Thrice Upon a Time	Hideaki Anno; Kazuya Tsurumaki; Katsuichi Nakayama; Mahiro Maeda	Khara
2021 (6th)	Josee, the Tiger and the Fish	Kotaro Tamura	Bones
2021 (6th)	Shirobako: The Movie	Tsutomu Mizushima	P.A. Works
2021 (6th)	Words Bubble Up Like Soda Pop	Kyōhei Ishiguro	Signal.MD and Sublimation
2021/2022 (7th)
2021/2022 (7th)	Jujutsu Kaisen 0	Sunghoo Park	MAPPA
2021/2022 (7th)	Bubble	Tetsurō Araki	Wit Studio
2021/2022 (7th)	Dragon Ball Super: Super Hero	Tetsuro Kodama	Toei Animation
2021/2022 (7th)	Inu-Oh	Masaaki Yuasa	Science SARU
2021/2022 (7th)	One Piece Film: Red	Gorō Taniguchi	Toei Animation
2021/2022 (7th)	The Deer King	Masashi Ando; Masayuki Miyaji	Production I.G
2022/2023 (8th)
2022/2023 (8th)	Suzume	Makoto Shinkai	CoMix Wave Films
2022/2023 (8th)	Black Clover: Sword of the Wizard King	Ayataka Tanemura	Pierrot
2022/2023 (8th)	Blue Giant	Yuzuru Tachikawa	NUT
2022/2023 (8th)	The First Slam Dunk	Takehiko Inoue	Toei Animation and DandeLion Animation Studio
2022/2023 (8th)	Kaguya-sama: Love Is War – The First Kiss That Never Ends	Mamoru Hatakeyama	A-1 Pictures
2022/2023 (8th)	Psycho-Pass Providence	Naoyoshi Shiotani	Production I.G
2023/2024 (9th)
2023/2024 (9th)	Look Back	Kiyotaka Oshiyama	Studio Durian
2023/2024 (9th)	Haikyu!! The Dumpster Battle	Susumu Mitsunaka	Production I.G
2023/2024 (9th)	Mononoke the Movie: Phantom in the Rain	Kenji Nakamura	EOTA
2023/2024 (9th)	My Hero Academia: You're Next	Tensai Okamura	Bones Film
2023/2024 (9th)	Spy × Family Code: White	Takashi Katagiri	Wit Studio and CloverWorks
2023/2024 (9th)	The Colors Within	Naoko Yamada	Science SARU
2025 (10th)
2025 (10th)	Demon Slayer: Kimetsu no Yaiba – The Movie: Infinity Castle	Haruo Sotozaki	Ufotable
2025 (10th)	100 Meters	Kenji Iwaizawa	Rock 'n' Roll Mountain
2025 (10th)	Chainsaw Man – The Movie: Reze Arc	Tatsuya Yoshihara	MAPPA
2025 (10th)	Mononoke the Movie: The Ashes of Rage	Kiyotaka Suzuki	EOTA and Crew-Cell
2025 (10th)	Scarlet	Mamoru Hosoda	Studio Chizu
2025 (10th)	The Rose of Versailles	Ai Yoshimura	MAPPA

== Records ==

CoMix Wave Films and Ufotable received the most wins for an animation studio with two.

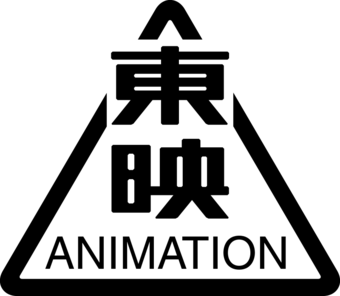
MAPPA and Toei Animation received the most nominations, while the latter has the most nominations without a win with four.

=== Studios ===
Studio	Wins	Nominations	Films
Ufotable	2	3	Demon Slayer: Kimetsu no Yaiba – The Movie: Infinity Castle, Demon Slayer: Kimetsu no Yaiba – The Movie: Mugen Train, Fate/stay night: Heaven's Feel I. presage flower
CoMix Wave Films	2		Disaster trilogy (Suzume and Your Name)
MAPPA	1	4	Chainsaw Man – The Movie: Reze Arc, In This Corner of the World, Jujutsu Kaisen 0, The Rose of Versailles
Bones Film	1	3	Josee, the Tiger and the Fish, My Hero Academia: Two Heroes, My Hero Academia: You're Next
Toei Animation	0	4	Dragon Ball Super: Super Hero, Mazinger Z: Infinity, One Piece Film: Red, The First Slam Dunk
Production I.G	0	3	Haikyu!! The Dumpster Battle, Psycho-Pass Providence, The Deer King
Science SARU	0	3	Inu-Oh, The Night Is Short, Walk On Girl, The Colors Within
Studio Chizu	0	3	Belle, Mirai, Scarlet
EOTA	0	2	Mononoke the Movie: Phantom in the Rain, Mononoke the Movie: The Ashes of Rage
Kyoto Animation	0	2	A Silent Voice, Liz and the Blue Bird
Shaft	0	2	Fireworks, Kizumonogatari III: Reiketsu-hen
Wit Studio	0	2	Bubble, Spy × Family Code: White

=== Directors ===
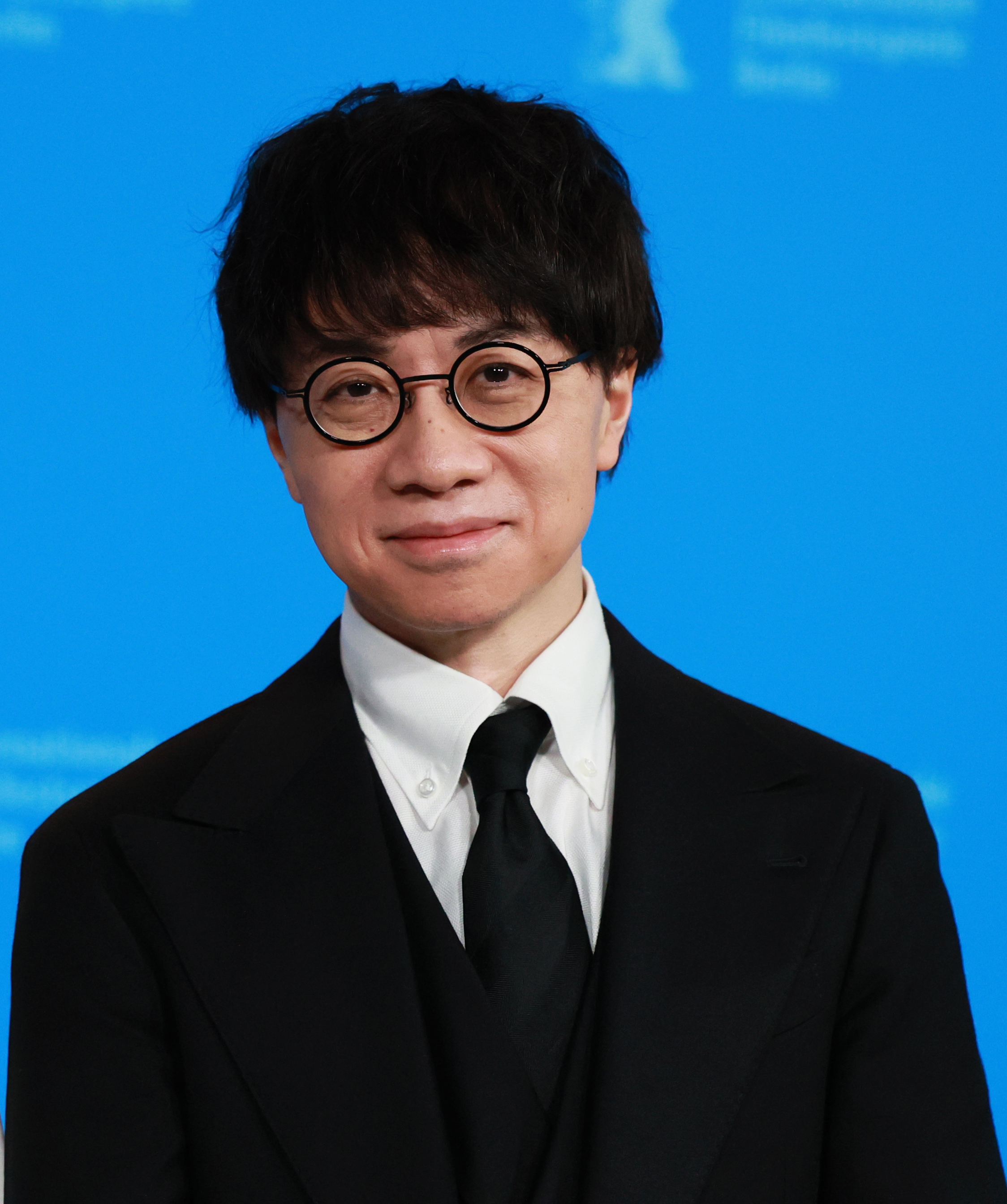
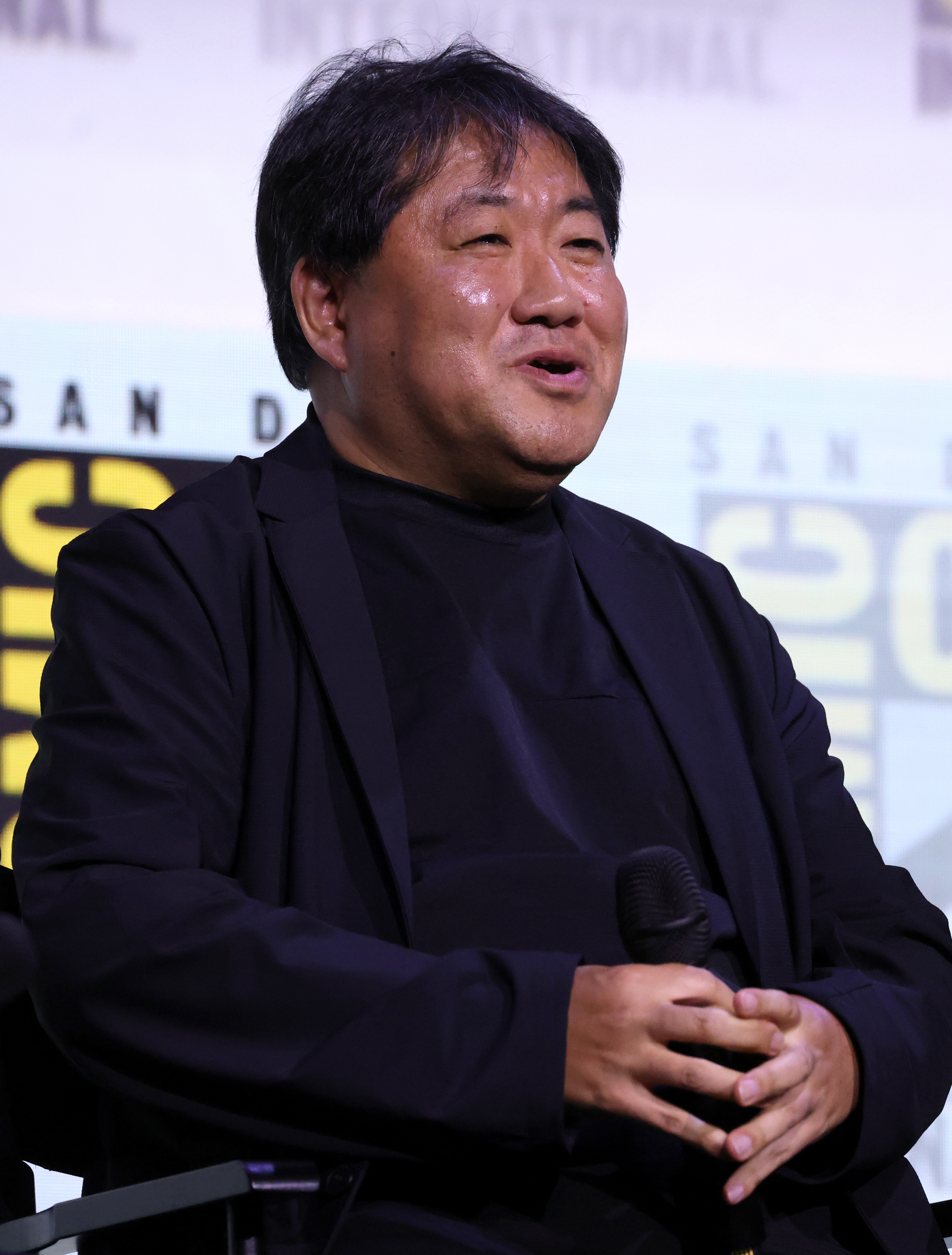
Makoto Shinkai and Haruo Sotozaki received the most wins for a film director with two.

Franchise	Wins	Nominations	Films
Makoto Shinkai	2		Suzume, Your Name
Haruo Sotozaki	2		Infinity Castle, Mugen Train
Mamoru Hosoda	0	3	Belle, Mirai, Scarlet
Naoko Yamada	0	3	A Silent Voice, Liz and the Blue Bird, The Colors Within
Akiyuki Shinbo	0	2	Kizumonogatari III: Reiketsu-hen, Fireworks
Masaaki Yuasa	0	2	The Night Is Short, Walk On Girl, Inu-Oh

=== Franchises ===
Franchise	Wins	Nominations	Films
Demon Slayer: Kimetsu no Yaiba	2		Infinity Castle, Mugen Train
Disaster trilogy	2		Your Name, Suzume
My Hero Academia	1	2	Two Heroes, You're Next
Mononoke	0	2	Phantom in the Rain, The Ashes of Rage
