= Mononoke the Movie: The Curse of the Serpent =

2026 film by Tomoaki Koshida

- Theatrical release poster
- Japanese: 劇場版「モノノ怪 第三章 蛇神」
- Revised Hepburn: Gekijōban Mononoke Daisanshō Hebigami
- Directed by: Kenji Nakamura (Note: Credited as "Chief Director" (総監督, Sō Kantoku)); Tomoaki Koshida
- Screenplay by: Yasumi Atarashi
- Based on: Mononoke by Toei Animation
- Produced by: Haruka Katō; Kimiaki Satō; Kōichi Naruse; Nanako Uematsu
- Starring: Hiroshi Kamiya; Atsumi Tanezaki; Haruka Tomatsu; Tomoyo Kurosawa; Yoko Hikasa; Miyu Irino; Yoshiko Sakakibara; Kenjiro Tsuda; Miyuki Sawashiro; Fumi Hirano; Mariko Honda; Eiji Takemoto; Yukana
- Cinematography: Hayato Kifune
- Edited by: Shigeru Nishiyama
- Music by: Taku Iwasaki
- Production companies: EOTA; Studio Kafka
- Distributed by: Twin Engine
- Release date: May 29, 2026
- Running time: 87 minutes
- Country: Japan
- Language: Japanese

Mononoke the Movie: The Curse of the Serpent (Note: Japanese: 劇場版「モノノ怪 第三章 蛇神」, Hepburn: Gekijōban Mononoke Daisanshō Hebigami; lit. "Mononoke the Movie Third Chapter: Snake God", also known as "Mononoke the Movie: Chapter III – The Curse of the Serpent") is a 2026 Japanese animated supernatural psychological horror film directed by Tomoaki Koshida with chief direction by Kenji Nakamura and written by Yasumi Atarashi; the film is based on the Mononoke anime television series (2007), which in turn is a spin-off of Ayakashi: Samurai Horror Tales anthology series (2006), both created by Toei Animation. Co-produced by EOTA and Studio Kafka and distributed by Twin Engine, The Curse of the Serpent is a sequel to The Ashes of Rage (2025), as well as the final film of the Mononoke trilogy film project. Hiroshi Kamiya reprises his role as the Medicine Seller, alongside Haruka Tomatsu, Tomoyo Kurosawa, Yoko Hikasa, Yukana, Miyu Irino, Kenjiro Tsuda, Yoshiko Sakakibara, and Atsumi Tanezaki, with Miyuki Sawashiro, Fumi Hirano, Mariko Honda and Eiji Takemoto joining the ensemble cast. The Curse of the Serpent was released in Japan on May 29, 2026.

Netflix licensed the film, and streamed on its platform on September 29, 2026.

== Plot ==
After the major two incidents, (Note: As depicted in Phantom in the Rain (2024) and The Ashes of Rage (2025)) the Medicine Seller still feels an ominous presence within the inner palace. He then faces against a Snake God, which threatens the Inner Chambers by strangling maids to their deaths.

== Voice cast ==
Character	Japanese
Medicine Seller	Hiroshi Kamiya
"Ri" Medicine Seller	Takahiro Sakurai
Botan Ōtomo	Haruka Tomatsu
Asa	Tomoyo Kurosawa
Fuki Tokita	Yoko Hikasa
Tenshi (Emperor)	Miyu Irino
Hokuto Mozorogi	Kenjiro Tsuda
Suikoin	Yoshiko Sakakibara
Sachiko	Atsumi Tanezaki
Third Emperess	Miyuki Sawashiro
Tokiwai	Fumi Hirano
Kawa	Mariko Honda
Amanotsubone	Yukana
Saku Mizorogi	Eiji Takemoto

== Production ==
In March 2025, the third and final film for the Mononoke anime trilogy film was announced, with its title reveal, The Curse of the Serpent. In December of that year, it was announced that Miyuki Sawashiro, Fumi Hirano and Mariko Honda have been cast, with the returning key staff members, while Tomoaki Koshida will direct the film, and Studio Kafka will co-produce the film with EOTA. In April 2026, it was announced that Eiji Takemoto was cast, while Yukana will return to voice a new character, and the theme song for the film is "No Epilogue" by Aina The End.

== Release ==
The film was released in Japan on May 29, 2026. In August 2026, Netflix acquired the international distribution rights for the film, and streamed on its platform on September 29, 2026.

== Reception ==
=== Critical reception ===
Richard Eisenbeis of Anime News Network gave the film an A− rating, and stated "The Curse of the Serpent is a fantastic capstone to the trilogy. It's visually stunning, musically strong, filled with supernatural mystery and action, and continues to highlight the plight against women in feudal Japanese society."

== Controversy ==
=== Return of Takahiro Sakurai ===
In February 2023, it was announced that the voice of the Medicine Seller was recast to Hiroshi Kamiya for the Phantom in the Rain after Takahiro Sakurai, who voiced the role for the television series, whose scandal came to light around that year. However, The Curse of the Serpent featured Sakurai reprising his version of the character in the climax of the film. Producer Kōji Yamamoto apologized to the fans after their mixed reactions, and later retired his position as a producer.
