= Mononoke the Movie: The Ashes of Rage =

2025 film by Kiyotaka Suzuki

- Theatrical release poster
- Japanese: 劇場版「モノノ怪 第二章 火鼠」
- Revised Hepburn: Gekijōban Mononoke Dainishō Hinezumi
- Directed by: Kenji Nakamura (Note: Credited as "Chief Director" (総監督, Sō Kantoku)); Kiyotaka Suzuki
- Screenplay by: Yasumi Atarashi
- Based on: Mononoke by Toei Animation
- Produced by: Kimiaki Satō; Yūki Sudō
- Starring: Hiroshi Kamiya; Haruka Tomatsu; Tomoyo Kurosawa; Yoko Hikasa; Yukana; Yuki Kaji; Chō; Kenyu Horiuchi; Ryō Horikawa; Yoshiko Sakakibara; Atsumi Tanezaki
- Cinematography: Hayato Kifune
- Edited by: Shigeru Nishiyama
- Music by: Taku Iwasaki
- Production companies: EOTA; Crew-Cell
- Distributed by: Giggly Box; Twin Engine
- Release date: March 14, 2025
- Running time: 74 minutes
- Country: Japan
- Language: Japanese

Mononoke the Movie: The Ashes of Rage (Note: Japanese: 劇場版「モノノ怪 第二章 火鼠」, Hepburn: Gekijōban Mononoke Dainishō Hinezumi; lit. "Mononoke the Movie Second Chapter: Fire Rat", also known as "Mononoke the Movie: Chapter II – The Ashes of Rage") is a 2025 Japanese animated supernatural psychological horror film directed by Kiyotaka Suzuki with chief direction by Kenji Nakamura, and written by Yasumi Atarashi; the film is based on the Mononoke anime television series (2007), which in turn is a spin-off of Ayakashi: Samurai Horror Tales anthology series (2006), both created by Toei Animation. Co-produced by EOTA and Crew-Cell, and co-distributed by Giggly Box and Twin Engine, The Ashes of Rage is a second film of the Mononoke trilogy film project, and a sequel to Phantom in the Rain (2024). Hiroshi Kamiya reprises his role as the voice of the Medicine Seller, alongside Haruka Tomatsu, Tomoyo Kurosawa, Yoko Hikasa, Yukana and Yuki Kaji, with Chō, Kenyu Horiuchi, Ryō Horikawa, Yoshiko Sakakibara and Atsumi Tanezaki joining the ensemble cast. The Ashes of Rage was released in Japan on March 14, 2025.

Netflix licensed the film, and released it on its platform on August 14, 2025. A sequel, Mononoke the Movie: The Curse of the Serpent was released on May 29, 2026.

== Plot ==
One month after the events taken place at the Inner Chambers, (Note: As depicted in Mononoke the Movie: Phantom in the Rain (2024)) the Medicine Seller returns to the imperial harem, where the carnal workings for the lower-ranking concubines seems to have improved under the management of Botan. However, the higher-ranking concubines continue to fight each other to produce a new imperial heir, and things come to a head when one of the concubines spontaneously combusts.

== Voice cast ==
Character	Japanese
Medicine Seller	Hiroshi Kamiya
Botan Ōtomo	Haruka Tomatsu
Asa	Tomoyo Kurosawa
Fuki Tokita	Yoko Hikasa
Saburōmaru Tokita	Yuki Kaji
Yoshimichi Tokita	Chō
Elderly Ōtomo	Kenyu Horiuchi
Fujimaki	Ryō Horikawa
Katsunuma	Naomi Kusumi
Suikōin	Yoshiko Sakakibara
Sayo	Yukana
Sachiko	Atsumi Tanezaki

== Production ==
In July 2024, Hiroshi Kamiya, the voice of the Medicine Seller, teased that he was recording his lines for the sequel to Mononoke the Movie: Phantom in the Rain. Later that month, it was announced that the Mononoke film project will consist of a trilogy, with the second film titled Mononoke the Movie: The Ashes of Rage. In December 2024, it was announced that Chō and Kenyu Horiuchi have been cast as new characters, while Haruka Tomatsu, Yoko Hikasa and Yuki Kaji are reprising their roles from the first film. The Ashes of Rage features returning key staff members from Phantom in the Rain, while Kiyotaka Suzuki is directing the film under Kenji Nakamura's chief direction, and Crew-Cell co-producing the film with EOTA. In February 2025, additional cast members were announced. Aina the End provided the theme song, titled "Flower Unrivaled" (花無双, Hana Musō).

== Release ==
The film was released in theaters in Japan on March 14, 2025. It was also screened at Anima Festival in Brussels on March 6, 2025. In June 2025, Netflix acquired the international distribution rights for the film, and streamed it on August 14, 2025.

== Reception ==
=== Box office ===
The Ashes of Rage made its debut in 6th place in the Japanese box office, one place higher than its predecessor, Phantom in the Rain.

=== Critical reception ===
Richard Eisenbeis of Anime News Network gave the film an A− rating, and stated "Buoyed by its supernatural twist, mystery, and visuals unlike any other anime out there, it is a fantastic follow-up to The Phantom in the Rain—even if it never quite reaches the lofty heights of that film". Aimee Hart of Polygon, in contrast, opined that Ashes of Rage was superior to Phantom in the Rain, calling it "one of the most haunting pieces of media" she watched in 2025.

=== Accolades ===
At the 10th Crunchyroll Anime Awards in 2026, Mononoke the Movie: The Ashes of Rage was nominated for Film of the Year. The film was also nominated in the Daruma for Best Feature Film at the Japan Expo Awards in the same year.

== Sequel ==
A third film, titled Mononoke the Movie: The Curse of the Serpent was released in Japan in May 2026.
