= Mononoke (TV series) =

Japanese anime television series and its adaptation(s)

- Promotional art
- モノノ怪
- Genre: Ghost story; Mystery; Psychological horror
- Director: Kenji Nakamura
- Screenplay: Chiaki J. Konaka; Ikuko Takahashi; Michiko Yokote; Manabu Ishikawa
- Character designer: Takashi Hashimoto
- Music: Yasuharu Takanashi
- Country of origin: Japan
- Original language: Japanese
- No. of episodes: 12

Production
- Sound director: Yukio Nagasaki
- Art directors: Takashi Kurahashi; Yumi Hosaka
- Color designer: Rumiko Nagai
- CG director: Nobuhiro Morita
- Editor: Kenta Katase
- Studios: Toei Animation
- Executive producers: Maasaki Yukawa; Masao Terashima; Norihiro Hayashida; Shinji Shimizu; Taizō Itō; Yukihiro Itō
- Producers: Atsuya Takase; Atsutoshi Umezawa; Hiroaki Shibata
- Production companies: Mononoke Production Team (Note: Production committee consists of Toei Animation, Asmik Ace, Dentsu, SKY Perfect Well Think, Sony Music Entertainment and Fuji Television)

Original release
- Network: Fuji TV (Noitamina)
- Release: July 12 – September 27, 2007

Related
- Manga
- Written by: Ninagawa Yaeko
- Published by: Square Enix
- Magazine: Young Gangan
- Original run: August 17, 2007 – August 1, 2008
- Volumes: 2
- Manga

Mononoke: Umibōzu
- Written by: Ninagawa Yaeko
- Published by: Tokuma Shoten
- Magazine: Monthly Comic Zenon
- Original run: September 25, 2013 – November 25, 2014
- Volumes: 2
- Manga

Mononoke: Karakasa
- Written by: Kitsuneko Nagata
- Published by: Kodansha
- Magazine: Monthly Shōnen Sirius
- Original run: May 26, 2024 – March 2, 2025
- Volumes: 2
- Films
- Phantom in the Rain (2024); The Ashes of Rage (2025); The Curse of the Serpent (2026)
- Preceded by
- Ayakashi: Samurai Horror Tales (2006)

Mononoke (Japanese: モノノ怪) is a Japanese anime television series produced by Toei Animation. A spin-off of 2006's horror anthology series Ayakashi: Samurai Horror Tales, Mononoke follows the character of the medicine seller from the Bakeneko story, as he continues to face a myriad of supernatural perils. The series takes place between the end of the Edo period and the Meiji era of Japan with a four-class system, with samurai being the highest class and merchants (such as the medicine seller himself) being in the lowest class. It aired on Fuji TV's Noitamina programming block between July 12 and September 27, 2007. It was licensed by Discotek Media in 2022.

The anime has spawned manga adaptations, two stage plays, and an anime film trilogy that was released between 2024 and 2026.

== Plot ==
Mononoke follows a wandering, nameless character known only as the "Medicine Seller" (voiced by Takahiro Sakurai). The series is made up of individual chapters in which the medicine seller encounters, combats, and subsequently destroys mononoke. Mononoke are a type of ayakashi, unnatural spirits that linger in the human world by binding themselves to negative human emotions. The Medicine Seller always proceeds in the same manner, using his knowledge of the supernatural to fend off the mononoke until he can learn the spirit's shape (Katachi), truth (Makoto), and reasoning (Kotowari). Only then can he unsheathe his sword and exorcise the demon. The English subtitles translate these three necessities as form, truth, and regret.

The film trilogy, while following the same plot, introduces a different Medicine Seller, the "Kon" Medicine Seller (voiced by Hiroshi Kamiya). Sakurai makes a cameo appearance as the first Medicine Seller (the "Ri" Medicine Seller) in the third film, Curse of the Serpent (2026).

=== Episodes 1–2: Zashiki-warashi ===
==== Plot ====
While spending the night in a traditional inn, the medicine seller stumbles upon a strange phenomenon. A pregnant woman named Shino, who is desperately seeking shelter at the inn, is led to the last vacant room. The room, though, is haunted by a group of Zashiki Warashi. When the Zashiki Warashi kill an assassin aiming for Shino's life, protecting Shino and her unborn child, the Medicine Seller inquires into the origin of the mononoke.

The innkeeper reveals that the inn used to be a brothel, which she owned and ran. The innkeeper forced her prostitutes to abort their children to continue working, and Shino's room is the room in which the abortions took place. The medicine seller realizes that the mononoke are attracted to Shino because of their strong desire to be born. The Zashiki Warashi want Shino to give birth to them, and she agrees, much to the Medicine Seller's dismay. She removes the talisman warding off the mononoke from her stomach. As it turns out, one of the Zashiki Warashi that she had met upon her arrival was in fact her own child. However, the overload of all the spirits causes Shino's in-the-womb child to start bleeding. At this point, realizing their wish would only cause harm to the only person who showed them kindness, the Zashiki Warashi smiles and allows the Medicine Seller to destroy them with the sword.

==== Characters ====
- Shino (志乃) (voiced by Rie Tanaka): The pregnant woman who seeks shelter on a rainy night. She became pregnant with a young lord's baby when working in a landlord's house and wishes to give birth safely.
- Hisayo (久代) (voiced by Toshiko Fujita): The keeper of the inn, which used to be a brothel she owned. The room she offered to Shino was where she forced her prostitutes to abort children.
- Tokuji (徳次) (voiced by Kōzō Shiotani): A helper in the inn. He is also the one who assisted Hisayo in forcing prostitutes to abort.
- Naosuke (直助) (voiced by Eiji Takemoto): An assassin who wants to kill Shino and her baby.
- Young Lord (voiced by Yūsuke Numata): The man who impregnated Shino and then abandoned her.
- Zashiki Warashi (座敷童子) (voiced by Aiko Hibi): The spirit of the children killed by Hisayo many years ago.

=== Episodes 3–5: Umibōzu ===
==== Plot ====
Traveling on a merchant's luxurious ship, the Medicine Seller and the other passengers drift into the Dragon's Triangle, a mysterious sea full of ayakashi. Among the passengers are Kayo, a servant girl from the Sakai house of Bakeneko fame; Genkei, a Buddhist monk; and Genyousai, a minstrel and spiritualist. Through the appearance of Umizatou, an ayakashi who demands that the passengers reveal their worst fears, the group discovers that Genkei was the one who set the ship off course.

Genkei explains that he and his sister Oyō, who was five years his junior, grew up very close ("too close", he states) because they were left alone on their tiny island home when their parents perished at sea. This lust for his sister drove him to become a Buddhist ascetic at the age of 15, leaving Oyō behind.

Although he faithfully immersed himself in study and the solitary monk's life, he still could not extinguish his lust for his sister. When he learned that their home island's ships were sinking and being destroyed at sea, he accepted his village's request for him to return to become a human sacrifice to the sea by being imprisoned alive in a "hollow boat" set adrift. He explained that he would rather be dead than live with his unquenchable thirst to "lie with" Oyō. However, on the night before he was to climb into the boat at sunrise, he met with Oyō, who was now 16 and "so pretty". She then confessed to him that she had the same feelings for him all along and that since they could never marry, she would rather become the sacrifice in his stead, preferring, as she stated, "to go to the pure land" rather than marry a man who was not her brother. Upon hearing this, the young, recently promoted monk fled, vowing to commit suicide to join Oyō in the afterlife. He could not do this and, instead, spent 50 years in deep meditation praying for the soul of his poor sister Oyō, her corpse supposedly adrift in the hollow boat in the Ayakashi Sea. However, deep down, he was actually glad that his sister died instead of him, and that guilt followed him. It was his intense focus—metaphorically and specifically, his right eye—on that area of the sea and magnified by his guilt over not truly loving his sister that had caused the Dragon's Triangle or Ayakashi (spirits, generally malevolent) Sea to be so deadly.

Tragically, the ayakashi showed the hollow boat to the current passengers by dragging it up from the bottom of the sea onto the deck of their ship. Although they thought they heard scratching from the inside, they discovered that it had lain empty for 50 years and that Oyō had in reality "given herself to the sea", as she too could no longer live with her own lust for her brother. The Medicine Seller discovers that Genkei is the mononoke, or at least his darker side has become one, and that this particular mononoke (literally translated as "enraged god who is sick", which forms when human feelings of vengeance, rage, guilt, etc. meld with Ayakashi) was responsible for the Ayakashi Sea's unrest. The medicine seller exterminates the mononoke at Genkei's request and restores calm to him. After 50 years of guilt and lust, he is now at peace, although his beloved Oyō died for naught.

==== Characters ====
- Kayo (加世) (voiced by Yukana): A woman who knows the medicine seller from the previous series Ayakashi: Samurai Horror Tales. She is a servant girl seeking a new job in Edo.
- Genkei (源慧) (voiced by Ryusei Nakao): A respected Buddhist monk.
- Sōgen (菖源) (voiced by Daisuke Namikawa): An apprentice monk following Genkei.
- Hyōe Sasaki (佐々木兵衛) (voiced by Daisuke Sakaguchi): A young samurai who possesses a famous sword named Kanesada.
- Genyōsai Yanagi (柳幻殃斉) (voiced by Tomokazu Seki): A minstrel practicing Shugendō who is knowledgeable about Ayakashi.
- Tamon Mikuniya (三國屋多門) (voiced by Yasuhiro Takato): The owner of the ship.
- Goromaru (五浪丸) (voiced by Eiji Takemoto): The captain of the ship.
- Umizatou (海座頭) (voiced by Norio Wakamoto): An ayakashi who demands that the passengers reveal their worst fears.
- Oyō (お庸) (voiced by Haruna Ikezawa): The younger sister of Genkei. She volunteered herself to replace Genkei as a sacrifice to the sea.

=== Episodes 6–7: Noppera-bō ===
==== Plot ====
A despairing woman named Ochou, wishing for freedom but unable to escape her oppression, confesses to killing her husband's entire family. The Medicine Seller doubts this story and visits Ochou in her prison cell to ask her for the truth, but encounters a mononoke in a Noh mask who fights the Medicine Seller and allows Ochou to escape. The man in the mask convinces Ochou that he has given her freedom by helping her kill her family, but the Medicine Seller pursues the two and reveals to Ochou that she had killed not her husband's family but herself. Ochou married into a good family as her mother wished, but in her desire to please her mother, she withstood abuse from her new family to the point of forsaking any happiness she could have gained from her life. When Ochou realizes this, the man in the Noh mask vanishes, and Ochou finds herself in her kitchen. It is implied that the man in the mask was an illusion conjured by the Medicine Seller to help Ochou escape—at the end of the episode, Ochou ignores her husband's orders and leaves her family, gaining the freedom she had long desired.

==== Characters ====
- Ochō (お蝶) (voiced by Houko Kuwashima): A woman who married into a good family. In order to please her mother, she withstands abuse from her husband's family.
- Man in Fox Mask (voiced by Hikaru Midorikawa): An Ayakashi wearing a fox mask. He can change his fox mask to other masks.
- Ochō's mother (voiced by Ako Mayama): She wishes for Ochō to marry into a good samurai family because she lost her husband.
- Ochō's husband (voiced by Eiji Takemoto): He treats Ochō badly, as if she is a servant.
- Ochō's husband's mother (voiced by Noriko Uemura): She doesn't like Ochō.
- Ochō's brother-in-law (voiced by Hiroshi Okamoto): The younger brother of Ochō's husband. He treats Ochō badly.
- Wife of Ochō's brother-in-law (voiced by Aki Sasaki): She treats Ochō badly as well.
- Magistrate (voiced by Fukuhara Kouhei): He judges Ochō's case.

=== Episodes 8–9: Nue ===
==== Plot ====
Three men seeking to marry Lady Ruri, the sole heir to the Fuenokouji school of incense (kōdō), arrive at her mansion to participate in a competition of incense, only to find that the fourth suitor is missing and that the Medicine Seller has taken his place. During the competition, Lady Ruri is murdered. When the Medicine Seller inquires as to why the three suitors are so desperate to inherit the school even after Lady Ruri's death, the suitors reveal that the competition is not actually over the school of incense, but the Toudaiji, a piece of wood rumored to grant its owner great power.

Although Medicine Seller presides over a second incense contest, none of the three suitors win the Toudaiji, as all are killed. It is revealed that the suitors had already been killed by the Toudaiji and that the Medicine Seller put on this act to make them realize their deaths. The medicine seller then asks the Toudaiji, the true mononoke, to reveal itself. The Toudaiji draws its sense of self-esteem from the fact that people value it so highly, yet in truth, it is nothing but a rotting piece of wood. The Toudaiji kills those who seek it, including Lady Ruri's suitors, perpetuating the bloodshed for its sake. The Medicine Seller destroys the Toudaiji, appeasing the souls of its victims, including Lady Ruri's suitors.

This chapter makes a reference to the Ranjatai (the type of the aforementioned piece of wood) that once existed in the Shōsōin (Great Treasure Room) of the Tōdai-ji temple in Nara, Japan.

==== Characters ====
- Ōsawa Rōbo (澤廬房) (voiced by Takeshi Aono): One of Lady Ruri's suitors. A courtier.
- Muromachi Tomoyoshi (室町具慶) (voiced by Eiji Takemoto): One of Lady Ruri's suitors. A samurai.
- Nakarai Tansui (半井淡澄) (voiced by Masashi Hirose): One of Lady Ruri's suitors. A fishmonger.
- Jissonji Konari (実尊寺惟勢) (voiced by Naoya Uchida): One of Lady Ruri's suitors, horribly murdered prior to the competition.
- Lady Ruri (瑠璃姫, Ruri-hime) (voiced by Wakana Yamazaki): The incense school founder who owns the Tōdaiji. She was murdered during the competition.
- Old woman (voiced by Yuri Kobayashi): A servant of Lady Ruri.
- Girl (voiced by Kamada Kozue): A mysterious girl who appears and disappears whenever Muromachi is alone.
- Nue (鵺): A murderous, shape-shifting mononoke born from the spirit of the Tōdaiji.

=== Episodes 10–12: Bakeneko ===
==== Plot ====
Set in a time decidedly later than the previous arcs—implied to be in the 1920s—the Medicine Seller boards a train with several other passengers. The train is a new model, having just released. Each passenger boarded the train with a ticket that they have won. The train hits a ghostly girl on the tracks, and the six passengers and the train car driver are locked in the first car - when the mayor attempts to leave the car, he is killed by a Goblin Cat (Bakeneko) mononoke. The Medicine Seller enters the car, the door locking behind him, sealing all of the passengers in the car. All the passengers have a connection to the death of a young newspaper reporter, Ichikawa Setsuko, who fell off an overpass and was run over by a train.

The medicine seller asks them to tell the truth about what happened on the day of the newspaper reporter's death; all are honest and disappear from the car, except for Ichikawa's boss, Moriya, who lies about his role in the events. The Mononoke then reveals to the Medicine Seller what truly happened: Ichikawa had uncovered corruption on the part of the mayor, and was about to publish a column revealing the mayor's corruption, but Moriya, who was in the pocket of the mayor, burnt Ichikawa's column. When she attempted to run away, claiming she still had the evidence and could publish the column in a rival newspaper, he knocked her unconscious, raped her, and threw her off the overpass. Still alive, she and a stray cat were run over by the train driven by the train car driver, as he had failed to stop the train in time; this caused the creation of the bakeneko mononoke. Ichikawa kills Moriya, the medicine seller exorcises the bakeneko, the passengers are saved, and the medicine seller challenges the audience to reveal to him their truth and reason, vowing to continue hunting mononoke as long as they roam the world.

==== Characters ====
- Kiyoshi Moriya (森谷 清, Moriya Kiyoshi) (voiced by Eiji Takemoto): A journalist who colludes with the mayor. Because they didn't want to reveal the secret of the subway, he murdered Setsuko, who knew the truth.
- Setsuko Ichikawa (市川 節子, Ichikawa Setsuko) (voiced by Fumiko Orikasa): A journalist. A subordinate of Kiyoshi Moriya. She found out the secret of the subway and attempted to report it, but she was then killed by Moriya. She reappeared as a ghost and finally killed Moriya.
- Jyutarō Fukuda (福田 寿太郎, Fukuda Jyutarō) (voiced by Hiroshi Iwasaki): The mayor.
- Sakae Kadowaki (門脇 栄, Kadowaki Sakae) (voiced by Minoru Inaba): A police officer whose task is to protect the mayor.
- Bunpei Kinoshita (木下 文平, Kinoshita Bunpei) (voiced by Seiji Sasaki): The driver of the train. Because he was tired while driving, he wasn't able to stop the train when he found Setsuko dropped on the railway.
- Chiyo Nomoto (野本 チヨ, Nomoto Chiyo) (voiced by Yukana): A waitress in a cafe who wishes to become a celebrity. In order to be known, she provided false testimony to the police about Setsuko's death.
- Haru Yamaguchi (山口 ハル, Yamaguchi Haru) (voiced by Yōko Sōmi): A widow. She heard the scream when meeting her lover, but she ignored it.
- Masao Kobayashi (小林 正男, Kobayashi Masao) (voiced by Aiko Hibi): A milk delivery boy who witnessed the death of Setsuko but escaped without calling the police.

== Media ==
=== Anime ===
Produced by Toei Animation, the anime series was directed by Kenji Nakamura and written by Chiaki J. Konaka, Ikuko Takahashi, Michiko Yokote, and Manabu Ishikawa. Takashi Hashimoto directed the animation and was the character designer; Takashi Kurahashi was the art director; its music was composed by Yasuharu Takanashi, and it was broadcast for twelve episodes on Fuji Television's block Noitamina between July and September 2007. The opening theme is "Kagen no Tsuki" (下弦の月; Last Quarter Moon), performed by Ryōta Komatsu and Charlie Kosei, while the ending theme is "Natsu no Hana" (ナツノハナ), performed by Juju.

Siren Visual licensed it for the Australian market.

==== Episodes ====
Episode	Japanese title	English title	Script	Animation	Director	Art
1	座敷童子（前編）	Zashiki-warashi（Part 1）	Ikuko Takahashi	Kenji Nakamura	Kenji Nakamura Kohei Hatano	Hashimoto Takashi
2	座敷童子（後編）	Zashiki-warashi（Part 2）	Ikuko Takahashi	Hisashi Watanabe		Natsuki Watanabe
3	海坊主（序の幕）	Umibōzu （Part 1）	Chiaki J. Konaka	Kazuhiro Furuhashi	Mana Uchiyama	Ikai Kazuyuki
4	海坊主（二の幕）	Umibōzu （Part 2）	Chiaki J. Konaka	Kazuhiro Furuhashi	Yoshihisa Matsumoto	Soga Atsushi
5	海坊主（大詰め）	Umibōzu （Part 3）	Chiaki J. Konaka	Kazuhiro Furuhashi	Kohei Hatano	Hidemi Kubo Yuuji Hakamada
6	のっぺらぼう（前編）	Noppera-bō（Part 1）	Manabu Ishikawa	Hidehito Ueda		Tatsuya Oka
7	のっぺらぼう（後編）	Noppera-bō（Part 2）	Manabu Ishikawa	Atsutoshi Umezawa Hisashi Watanabe	Yukihiko Nakao	Natsuki Watanabe Yuji Hakamada
8	鵺（前編）	Nue（Part 1）	Chiaki J. Konaka	Koji Yamasaki		Megumi Ishihara Hidemi Kubo
9	鵺（後編）	Nue（Part 2）	Chiaki J. Konaka	Koji Yamasaki		Hideoki Kusama Shigeki Kuhara Kenji Hayama Megumi Ishihara
10	化猫（序の幕）	Bakeneko（Part 1）	Ikuko Takahashi	Iku Ishiguro	Kohei Hatano	Mikine Kuwahara Yuji Hakamada
11	化猫（二の幕）	Bakeneko（Part 2）	Ikuko Takahashi	Iku Ishiguro	Hidehito Ueda	Tatsuya Oka
12	化猫（大詰め）	Bakeneko（Part 3）	Michiko Yokote	Iku Ishiguro	Kenji Nakamura	Takashi Hashimoto

==== Films ====
At the 15th anniversary event held on June 18, 2022, an anime film by Twin Engine was announced. Kenji Nakamura returned to direct the film. Originally, it was scheduled to premiere in 2023; however, in February 2023, it was announced that the film would be delayed to beyond 2023. Additionally, Takahiro Sakurai, who originally was returning to reprise the role of the medicine seller, was removed from the cast of the film. The film, titled Mononoke the Movie: Phantom in the Rain, was released on July 26, 2024, with Hiroshi Kamiya performing the role of the Medicine Seller. The film was screened at the 28th Fantasia International Film Festival on July 20, 2024. In June 2024, Kamiya announced that a sequel is in production; whereas the first film focused on the karakasa, the second film focuses on the hinezumi. In July, it was announced that the Mononoke film project will have three films. The second film, titled Mononoke the Movie: The Ashes of Rage, was released in Japan on March 14, 2025. The final film, Mononoke the Movie: The Curse of the Serpent, was released in Japan on May 29, 2026.

In 2026, after the release of the final film in the trilogy, a new project was announced, with a new Medicine Seller to be voiced by Hirofumi Araki (who had previously played the Medicine Seller in the Mononoke stage play adaptation).

=== Manga ===
A manga adaptation of the original Bakeneko arc was published in Young Gangan between August 17, 2007, and August 1, 2008. The individual chapters were collected and released in two tankōbon (collected volumes) by Square Enix on January 25, 2008, and September 25, 2008. A second manga series started to be published on September 25, 2013, by Tokuma Shoten in its magazine Monthly Comic Zenon. The last chapter of it was serialized in Monthly Comic Zenon on November 25, 2014. The series was released in two volumes on July 19, 2014, and December 20, 2014, respectively. A manga adaptation of the Mononoke the Movie: Phantom in the Rain film by Kitsuneko Nagata was serialized in Kodansha's Monthly Shōnen Sirius magazine from May 26, 2024, to March 2, 2025, and collected in two volumes.

=== Stage plays ===
At the 15th anniversary event held on June 18, 2022, a stage play based on the anime series was announced. It ran from February 4–15, 2023, in Tokyo.

A second stage play, titled Stage Mononoke ~Zashiki Warashi~ (舞台 もののけ 〜座敷 ワラシ〜, Butai Mononoke ~Zashiki Warashi~), ran from March 21–24 and April 4–7, 2024, at the IMM Theater in Tokyo, and March 29–31 at the WW Hall of the Cool Japan Park in Osaka.

=== Light novels ===
A light novel written by Hideyuki Niki, with cover art by Oku, titled Mononoke Shu (モノノ怪 執; 'Mononoke: Possessed'), was published by Kadokawa on June 10, 2022. It features six short stories about various victims of Mononoke and their encounters with the Medicine Seller. A second volume, titled Mononoke Oni (モノノ怪 鬼; 'Mononoke: Demon'), was released on June 13, 2024. A third volume, titled Mononoke Mō (モノノ怪 妄; 'Mononoke: Delusion'), was released on April 24, 2026.

A light novel adaptation of the Mononoke the Movie: Phantom in the Rain film by Yasumi Atarashi was published by Kadokawa in Japan on June 13, 2024.

== Reception ==
The directing and art have been called "boldly confrontational". It blends a murder mystery structure with a "twist of supernatural and a shake of historical, peppered with plenty of stylistic experimentation". It frequently achieves "the ideal – great directing combined with great animation". The Mainichi Shimbun newspaper said it could not be dismissed as a mere experiment and that the story's themes were every bit as advanced as the digital animation techniques employed.

== See also ==
- Princess Mononoke
- Yōkai
