= City Hunter: Shinjuku Private Eyes =

2019 Japanese anime film

City Hunter the Movie: Shinjuku Private Eyes
- Theatrical release poster

Japanese name
- Kana: 劇場版シティーハンター <新宿プライベート･アイズ>
Transcriptions
- Revised Hepburn: Gekijō-ban Shitī Hantā 〈Shinjuku Puraibēto Aizu〉
- Directed by: Kenji Kodama (chief)
- Screenplay by: Yoichi Kato
- Based on: City Hunter by Tsukasa Hojo
- Produced by: Go Wakabayashi; Naohiro Ogata
- Starring: Akira Kamiya; Kazue Ikura; Marie Iitoyo; Koichi Yamadera; Harumi Ichiryusai; Tessho Genda; Hochu Otsuka; Mami Koyama; Keiko Toda; Chika Sakamoto; Yoshimi Tokui (Tutorial)
- Music by: Taku Iwasaki
- Production company: Sunrise
- Distributed by: Aniplex
- Release date: February 8, 2019
- Running time: 95 minutes
- Country: Japan
- Language: Japanese

City Hunter the Movie: Shinjuku Private Eyes (劇場版シティーハンター <新宿プライベート･アイズ>, Gekijō-ban Shitī Hantā〈Shinjuku Puraibēto Aizu〉) is a 2019 Japanese animated action comedy film based on the manga City Hunter by Tsukasa Hojo and part of its media franchise, serving as the fourth film in the City Hunter series. Produced by Sunrise, the film was chief directed by Kenji Kodama from a screenplay by Yoichi Kato and features most of the voice cast from the original 1987 anime television series and its sequels returning alongside guest stars such as actress Marie Iitoyo. It also features an appearance from the titular trio from Cat's Eye that being Hitomi, Rui and Ai with Hitomi and Ai being reprised by both Keiko Toda and Chika Sakamoto from TMS Entertainment's 1983–1985 anime television series of the same name.

The film was released in Japanese theatres by Aniplex on February 8, 2019.

== Cast ==
Character	Japanese voice actor	English voice actor
Ryo Saeba	Akira Kamiya	Stephen Fu
Kaori Makimura	Kazue Ikura	Morgan Garrett
Ai Shindo	Marie Iitoyo	Tia Ballard
Shinji Mikuni	Koichi Yamadera	Christopher Wekhamp
Saeko Nogami	Harumi Ichiryusai	Marissa Lenti
Umibozu	Tessho Genda	Chris Rager
Miki	Mami Koyama	Michelle Rojas
Vince Ingardo	Hochu Otsuka	Kent Williams
Hitomi Kisugi	Keiko Toda (Note: Toda temporarily replaces Toshiko Fujita as Rui.)	Alexis Tipton
Rui Kisugi	Keiko Toda	Dawn M. Bennett
Ai Kisugi	Chika Sakamoto	Megan Shipman

== Production and release ==
The film was announced on March 19, 2018. Kenji Kodama who directed the last two City Hunter sequels, returns to chief direct the film while the main cast from the anime series returns to reprise their roles. The film was released on February 8, 2019, with screenings in 4DX beginning on March 1 of that same year. The film's North American premiere occurred during Anime Boston 2019 on April 20 of that year.

In North America, Discotek Media licensed the film and released it on Blu-ray on May 26, 2020.

== Music ==
The soundtrack was released on February 6, 2019, by Aniplex alongside a vocal collection. Like with all City Hunter animated media, the film features multiple pieces of music being played throughout the film. The opening theme is titled "Mr. Cool" performed by Amazons and Lotus Juice. It also features songs from past City Hunter series and films. Amazons also contributes to a cover of "Cat's Eye" from the 1983-85 Cat's Eye anime series. "Get Wild", performed by TM Network from the original 1987 series serves as its ending theme while "Still Love Her (Ushinawatera Fuukei)" plays after that alongside score from Taku Iwasaki.

== Reception ==
Matt Schley of the Japan Times gave City Hunter: Shinjuku Private Eyes 2.5 out of 5 stars and found the film's humor to be "out-of-touch" and its concept largely the same as the previous adaptations, though he noted that this consistency may be what makes the franchise popular and appealing to fans. Kim Morrissy of Anime News Network rated the film a B and also considered it a nostalgic and faithful tribute to the original series that, despite its predictable plot and outdated character dynamics, delivers exciting action and heartfelt moments, making it a satisfying experience primarily for fans. Reuben Baron of Comic Book Resources called the film a "straightforward, and self-contained, action-comedy B-movie", finding it entertaining and noting that it effectively appeals to both fans and newcomers alike, despite its slightly derivative story and repetitive humor.

== Light novel ==
A light novel adaptation by Kenta Fukui was released on February 8, 2019, by Tokuma Shoten.
