= Mononoke the Movie: Phantom in the Rain =

2024 film by Kenji Nakamura

- Theatrical release poster
- Japanese: 劇場版「モノノ怪 唐傘」
- Revised Hepburn: Gekijōban Mononoke Karakasa
- Directed by: Kenji Nakamura
- Screenplay by: Kenji Nakamura; Kōji Yamamoto
- Based on: Mononoke by Toei Animation
- Produced by: Kōshō Satō; Yūki Sudō
- Starring: Hiroshi Kamiya; Tomoyo Kurosawa; Aoi Yūki; Mami Koyama; Kana Hanazawa; Haruka Tomatsu; Yoko Hikasa; Yūko Kaida; Yukana; Yuki Kaji; Jun Fukuyama; Daisuke Hosomi; Miyu Irino; Kenjiro Tsuda
- Cinematography: Hayato Kifune
- Edited by: Shigeru Nishiyama
- Music by: Taku Iwasaki
- Production company: EOTA
- Distributed by: Giggly Box; Twin Engine
- Release date: July 26, 2024
- Running time: 89 minutes
- Country: Japan
- Language: Japanese

Mononoke the Movie: Phantom in the Rain (Note: Japanese: 劇場版「モノノ怪 唐傘」, Hepburn: Gekijōban Mononoke Karakasa; lit. "Mononoke the Movie: Paper Umbrella") is a 2024 Japanese animated supernatural psychological horror film written and directed by Kenji Nakamura with Kōji Yamamoto as a co-writer; the film is based on the Mononoke anime television series (2007), which in turn is a spin-off of Ayakashi: Samurai Horror Tales anthology series (2006), both created by Toei Animation. Produced by EOTA and co-distributed by Giggly Box and Twin Engine, Phantom in the Rain is the first part of the Mononoke trilogy film project. The film stars Hiroshi Kamiya as the voice of the Medicine Seller, alongside Tomoyo Kurosawa, Aoi Yūki, Mami Koyama, Kana Hanazawa, Haruka Tomatsu, Yoko Hikasa, Yūko Kaida, Yukana, Yuki Kaji, Jun Fukuyama, Daisuke Hosomi, Miyu Irino and Kenjiro Tsuda. Phantom in the Rain was released in Japan on July 26, 2024.

Netflix acquired the streaming rights for the film, which was released worldwide on November 28, 2024. A sequel, Mononoke the Movie: The Ashes of Rage was released in Japan on March 14, 2025, followed by Mononoke the Movie: The Curse of the Serpent, released on May 29, 2026.

== Synopsis ==
A girl named Asa is trying to advance her career, while another named Kame is seeking her dream to participate in the carnal workings of the Inner Chambers. As the elderly Utayama does her best to conceal its secrets, the Medicine Seller arrives and begins to unravel the horrifying and painful truth at the heart of the Inner Chambers.

== Voice cast ==
Character	Japanese	English
Medicine Seller	Hiroshi Kamiya	Crispin Freeman
Asa	Tomoyo Kurosawa	Alejandra Reynoso
Kame	Aoi Yūki	Abby Espiritu
Utayama	Mami Koyama	Janet Borrus
Kitagawa	Kana Hanazawa	Felecia Angelle
Botan Ootomo	Haruka Tomatsu	Natalie Van Sistine
Fuki Tokita	Yoko Hikasa	Ashely Biski
Awashima	Yūko Kaida	Stephanie Sheh
Mugitani	Yukana	Allegra Clark
Saburomaru	Yuki Kaji	Brandon McInnis
Hiramoto	Jun Fukuyama	Todd Haberkorn
Sakashita	Daisuke Hosomi	Blythe Melin
Tenshi (Emperor)	Miyu Irino	Ryan Colt Levy
Hokuto Mizorogi	Kenjiro Tsuda	
Futsukadzuki	Misaki Watada	Kira Buckland
Mikadzuki	Sae Hiratsuka	Ryan Bartley
Take	Himika Akaneya	
Matsu	Ruriko Aoki	
Suma	Nanako Mori	
Kiyo	Yū Serizawa	Courtney Lin
Kume	Miharu Hanai	
Tome	Mayu Sagara	
Fuku	Rena Maeda	
Chouju	Kimiko Saitō	
Sudo	Koya Noda	Ryan Colt Levy
Asanuma	Masaya Miyazaki	Jonathan Leon
Kimura	Shinya Takahashi	

== Production ==
In June 2022, it was announced that the Mononoke anime series would receive a film adaptation in 2023, with Kenji Nakamura returning to direct the film, while EOTA handling the animation. In February 2023, EOTA announced that Takahiro Sakurai, who voiced the character in the 2007 series, would not be reprising his role as the Medicine Seller. The role was recast to Hiroshi Kamiya. Additional staff members were also revealed, with Yūichi Takahashi serving as a character designer from Kitsuneko Nagata's original character concept, and music composed by Taku Iwasaki. In March 2024, Tomoyo Kurosawa, Aoi Yūki and Mami Koyama was cast for the film. In April of that year, more cast members were announced, along with Aina the End providing the theme song for the film, titled "Love Sick".

== Release ==
The film was slated to release in 2023, but was later postponed to July 26, 2024. It was also released in Montreal at the 28th Fantasia International Film Festival the same month, where it won bronze in the animated film category. In September of the same year, Netflix acquired global streaming rights for the film, and released on November 28, 2024.

== Reception ==
=== Box office ===
On its debut weekend, the film opened in 229 theaters, and ranked at #7 in the Japanese box office.

=== Critical reception ===
Matt Schley of The Japan Times gave the film 3 out of 5 star rating, as he praised the tone shift and making the film different from the television series, but also felt overwhelmed by its pacing, despite the 90 minute-length. Richard Eisenbeis of Anime News Network gave the film a solid A rating, and stated "Without its groundbreaking visuals, Mononoke The Movie: Karakasa would still be a film worth watching thanks to its mystery, suspense, and well-explored themes." Susana Polo of Polygon praised the film for its visuals, mystery, protagonist, and faithfulness to the format of the original anime series, but noted that it would be difficult for those who were not fans of the anime to enjoy the film.

=== Accolades ===
The film won the Satoshi Kon Award for Achievement in Animation and the Bronze Prize for Best Animated Feature at the 28th Fantasia International Film Festival in 2024. It was nominated for Film of the Year at the 9th Crunchyroll Anime Awards in 2025.

== Adaptations ==
A light novel adaptation by Yasumi Atarashi was published by Kadokawa in Japan on June 13, 2024. A manga adaptation by Kitsuneko Nagata was serialized in Kodansha's Monthly Shōnen Sirius magazine from May 26, 2024, to March 2, 2025, and collected in two volumes.

== Sequels ==
In July 2024, it was announced that a sequel was in production, and later that month, it was announced that the Mononoke film project will have three films. The second film, titled Mononoke the Movie: The Ashes of Rage, (Note: 劇場版「モノノ怪 第二章 火鼠」, Gekijōban Mononoke Dainishō: Hinezumi; lit. "Theatrical Feature Mononoke Second Chapter: Fire Rat", also known as "Mononoke the Movie: Chapter II – The Ashes of Rage") was released on March 14, 2025. The third film, Mononoke the Movie: The Curse of the Serpent, (Note: 劇場版「モノノ怪 第三章 蛇神」, Gekijōban Mononoke Daisanshō Hebigami; lit. "Theatrical Feature Mononoke Chapter 3: Snake God", also known as "Mononoke the Movie: Chapter III – The Curse of the Serpent") was released on May 29, 2026.
