= City Hunter: Angel Dust =

2023 anime film

- Directed by: Kenji Kodama (chief); Kazuyoshi Takeuchi
- Screenplay by: Yasuyuki Muto
- Based on: City Hunter by Tsukasa Hojo
- Starring: Akira Kamiya; Kazue Ikura
- Music by: Taku Iwasaki
- Production companies: Sunrise; The Answer Studio
- Distributed by: Aniplex
- Release date: September 8, 2023; (Japan)
- Running time: 94 minutes
- Country: Japan
- Language: Japanese
- Box office: 1,060,000,000 JPY (equivalent to ~7 million USD)

City Hunter: Angel Dust, also known as City Hunter The Movie: Angel Dust (Japanese: 劇場版シティーハンター 天使の涙 (エンジェルダスト), Hepburn: Gekijō-ban Shitī Hantā Tenshi no Namida (Enjeru Dasuto)), is a 2023 Japanese animated action film. It is part of the City Hunter franchise and is a follow-up to the 2019 film City Hunter: Shinjuku Private Eyes. It is adapting the first part of the final arc of the City Hunter manga. The film was directed by Kazuyoshi Takeuchi and Kenji Kodama.

Like other City Hunter episodes and films, Angel Dust stars Ryo Saeba, a "sweeper" who does dangerous odd jobs as part of "City Hunter", a business partnership with Kaori Makimura. He is contacted by a beautiful foreigner, Angie, and asked for help in retrieving her missing cat. While Ryo contents himself to goofy and lascivious antics at first, Ryo and his other allies eventually find themselves contending against assassins working for an international criminal mercenary outfit who seem to have an interest in Angie. All parties are also searching for "Angel Dust Modified" (ADM), a missing nanomachine serum that might turn those affected by it who survive into super soldiers. The original formulation of Angel Dust is also given a tie to Ryo's own backstory with his former partner Hideyuki Makimura.

The returning characters are all played by the same voice actors as when the original anime first aired in 1987, a rarity for such a long-running franchise.

== Plot ==
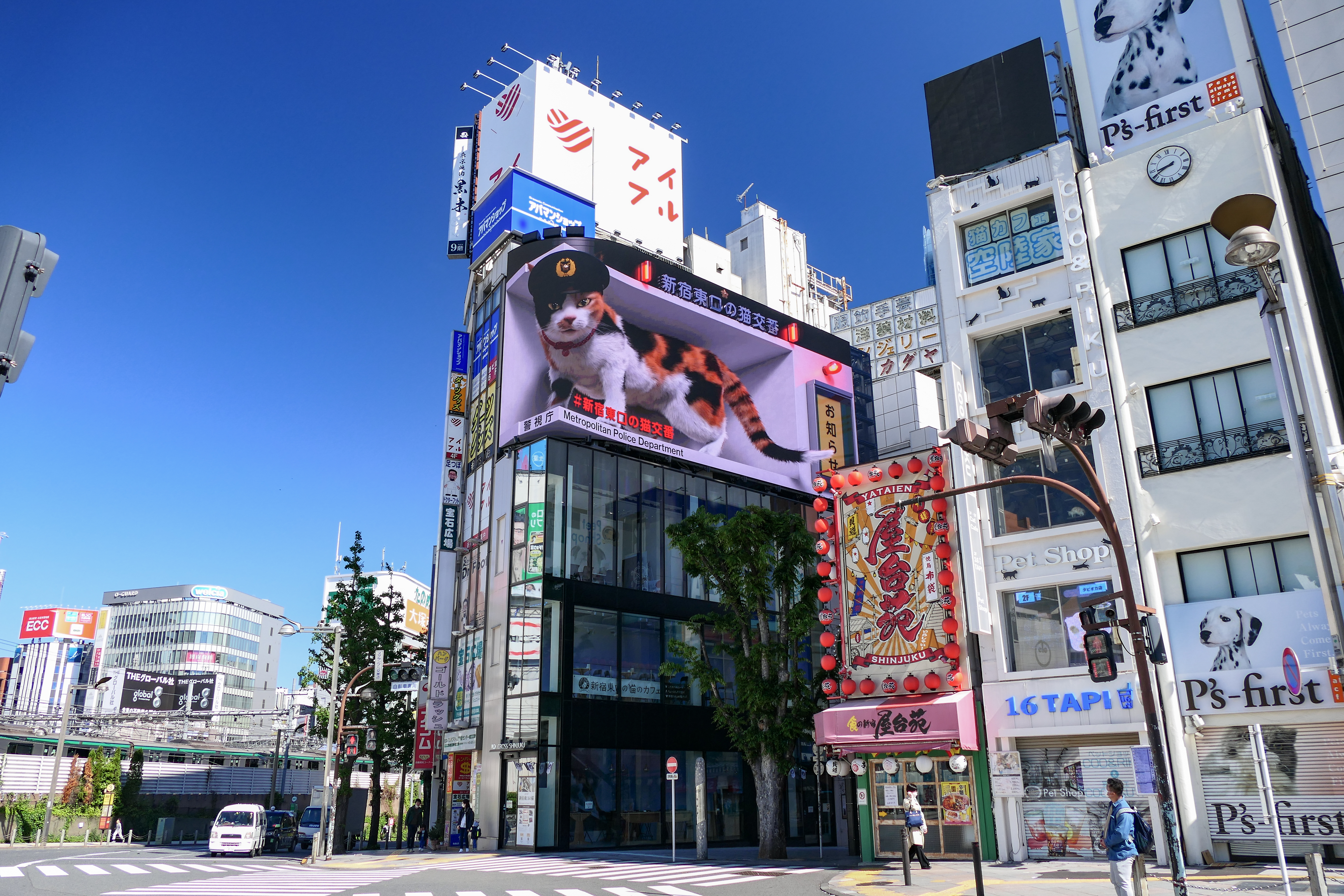
The Shinjuku Cross Vision 3D Calico cat, a plot point in the film

Sweepers Ryo and Falcon, along with the Kisugi sisters, raid a facility. Ryo & Falcon distract the guards, while the sisters grab the target, an uninspiring piece of art. A masked assailant intervenes and shoots the prize out of their hands; within the painting was a box with an injector and three vials of blue fluid. The unknown intruder and Ryo fight briefly; Ryo notices the intruder uses the same gun he does, but the intruder escapes.

Back in Shinjuku, the police are annoyed with Ryo, as they'd heard word of a deal for the goods involving the underworld gang Red Pegasus. They'd been planning to bust the sale, but now it's been stolen. They say that the liquid was "ADM" or "Angel Dust Modified", an incredibly rare sample of nanomachines designed to create super soldiers. Ryo is already familiar with them, and says that an international conspiracy called Union Teope is behind Red Pegasus and the biotech corporation that made ADM.

A new client requests City Hunter's help: Angie, a beautiful foreigner who recently arrived in Japan. She offers an outrageous fee for help finding her missing cat, saying that she had planned to create Internet videos on a tour of Japan starring her cat. Kaori, Ryo's partner, eagerly accepts and launches herself into the inexplicably lucrative cat search, while Ryo mostly makes perverted attempts at ogling Angie and makes little effort in the cat hunt. It gradually becomes clear that Angie is hiding secrets, as she initially recognized Ryo, has signs of bullet wounds on her body, and her alleged cat is a copy of a virtual cat used in a prominent attraction in Shinjuku. Unknown assassins show up to threaten her. Angie changes her story to merely seeking Ryo's protection from assassins, but Ryo eventually reveals that he had known the whole time she was the mysterious assailant who took the ADM during the heist. He isn't particularly bothered, though, and after a showdown and fight at an abandoned school, is eager to go on a date with her regardless.

The preceding events and backstories gradually come into focus. The leader of Union Teope, referred to as "Mayor", had sent his "Wet Work" team of three assassins into Tokyo at the start: level-headed Pirarucu, the knife-wielding Espada, and Anonimo (aka Angie). Anonimo had gone rogue in stealing the ADM for herself and getting close to Ryo, hence the other assassin's interest in her. She sought to prove that Angel Dust wasn't needed, and that she was the true "masterpiece" assassin, by stealing it and then killing Ryo. Ryo, too, had been one of the Mayor's trainees long ago, but had left the organization. Almost all of the people injected with the original type of Angel Dust died; Ryo was the only survivor, partially explaining his preternatural toughness and skill. Pirarucu notes that both the Mayor and Anonimo are unhealthily obsessed with Ryo: the Mayor in seeing Ryo as the prodigal son he wishes to return, and Anonimo to surpass him in her adoptive father's eyes.

The conflict culminates in a final confrontation at the waterfront between the assassins, Ryo and his allies, Red Pegasus, and the police. In a car chase, the assassins steal the ADM back from Ryo & Kaori. Angie and Espada fight, but Kaori fires a rocket launcher borrowed from Miki that topples an industrial tower, which crashes on Espada. Espada survives and attacks Angie one last time before she kills him with his own knife. Pirarucu attempts to talk Angie down from her plans, but fails; he dies shielding Angie from bullets fired by an attack helicopter, which Angie destroys with her Colt Python after getting to safety. However, the ADM which Angie had recovered floats away in the river. Angie challenges Ryo to a duel. They fight, but Ryo has the upper hand. As Angie is ready to concede, the Mayor, who had been watching from afar in his boat, fires a rifle round containing the recovered ADM at Angie. The nanomachines heal her; now capable of keeping up with Ryo, the battle resumes. Angie realizes that the ADM is driving her into an insane berserk state. Unable to directly kill herself, she decides to provoke Ryo, the only one who can do it. He kills her with his trademark one-hole shot.

In a post-credits scene, Ryo and Kaori stop at Angie's grave to pay their respects. The Mayor shows up to offer flowers as well, to Ryo's displeasure.

== Cast ==
- Akira Kamiya as Ryo Saeba, a "sweeper" based in Shinjuku who performs odd and dangerous missions for his clients
- Kazue Ikura as Kaori Makimura, Ryo's close partner
- Miyuki Sawashiro as Angie, a wealthy video content creator who has lost her cat
- Tesshō Genda as Falcon, a "sweeper" associated with Cat's Eye Cafe
- Mami Koyama as Miki, an ally of Falcon & Ryo's, also associated with Cat's Eye Cafe
- Yōko Asagami as Saeko Nogami, a detective with the police
- Hideyuki Tanaka as Hideyuki Makimura, Kaori's adopted older brother and Ryo's former partner; appears only in flashbacks
- Subaru Kimura as Espada, an assassin in "Wet Work"
- Tomokazu Seki as Pirarucu, an assassin in "Wet Work"
- Kenyu Horiuchi as Shin Kaibara / Reyall / "Mayor", a criminal mastermind

Several other characters have minor cameo roles. Keiko Toda (Hitomi), Rika Fukami (Rui), and Chika Sakamoto (Ai) play the Kisugi sisters, art thieves who are cameos from Cat's Eye and the owners of the Cat's Eye Cafe that Falcon and Miki staff. There is also a brief appearance from Lupin III and Daisuke Jigen of the Lupin III franchise, as well as the cat Tama from Tama and Friends.

== Production ==
The City Hunter franchise went largely dormant around the turn of the millennium, with the last manga being published in 1991 and the last anime in 1999. It returned in 2019 with the film City Hunter: Shinjuku Private Eyes, a revival whose 1.5 billion JPY in gross revenue was considered a success. Another City Hunter film was greenlit, with Kenji Kodama, the original director of the TV series, returning as general director and Kazuyoshi Takeuchi as (co-)director.

== Music ==
Taku Iwasaki composed the score for the film. It was released as a CD album City Hunter The Movie: Angel Dust – Original Soundtrack in September 2023.

The film features new songs from TM Network, the band long associated with the anime. These include the opening song "Whatever Comes"; the insert songs of "DEVOTION", "Angie", "Watching Your Sky"; and a new version of "Get Wild" for the ending. The band released an album on June 14, 2023, in advance of the movie called DEVOTION, as well as digitally releasing a single titled Whatever Comes.

== Release ==
The film was released in Japan on September 8, 2023. Later releases in Thailand, Singapore, Hong Kong, Indonesia, Vietnam, and India followed. A small North American premier was held in August 2024 at the Japan Society, timed to coincide with the Anime NYC convention.

A Blu-ray and DVD version was released on July 31, 2024.

== Reception ==
The film topped the weekend Japanese box office in its release weekend of September 8 to 10, grossing the equivalent of around $2.2 million (in US dollars).

According to the Motion Picture Producers Association of Japan (MPPAJ), City Hunter: Angel Dust made 1.06 billion JPY in revenue at the box office in 2023 (roughly equivalent to $7 million US).

Audience reception was mixed. One reviewer, Machiko Nakagawa, wrote that they thought the film's tone was not very fitting. The manga had started with a somewhat hard-boiled arc about international drug runners in its premise, but quickly pivoted to a zanier and more humorous style through most of its run. The final manga arc, however, returned to this grittier style for a suitably dangerous opponent to close out on, by having Saeba face off against the gang responsible for the death of his original partner Hideyuki. Despite this, the film adaptation was mostly on the goofy side, and more focused on Anonimo's pining for the villain's recognition rather than Ryo's relationship with his past. Nakagawa acknowledged that compressing a whole plot arc into a movie's runtime was difficult, but still felt the result was "rough", although it was still good enough to keep her interested in a possible sequel.
