= Chika Sakamoto =

Japanese voice actress (born 1959)

- 坂本 千夏
- Born: Chika Ishihara (石原 千夏) (née Chika Sakamoto (坂本 千夏)); August 17, 1959 (age 67); Tokyo, Japan
- Other name: Chikabō (チカ坊)
- Occupation: Voice actress
- Years active: 1981–present
- Agent: Arts Vision
- Website: Official profile

Chika Sakamoto (坂本 千夏, Sakamoto Chika; born August 17, 1959) is a Japanese voice actress who is affiliated with Arts Vision. She grew up in Kawasaki City and Totsuka Ward in Yokohama.

As a voice actress, she is best known for her roles as Mei Kusakabe in My Neighbor Totoro, Tendonman and Chibizou-kun in Let's Go! Anpanman, the titular character Kuro in Cyborg Kuro-chan, Agumon in Digimon, and Ai Kisugi in Cat's Eye.

== Biography ==
=== Early life ===
Sakamoto was born on August 17, 1959, in Tokyo, Japan. She was a bright child who by the age of two could read and memorize her grandmother's phone number. In kindergarten, she moved to Kawasaki City, Kanagawa Prefecture and moved to Totsuka Ward, Yokohama, Kanagawa Prefecture in middle school.

In fourth grade, she performed Kiyoko Suizenji's "Ippon Dokko no Uta" at a relative's wedding held in Ibaraki Prefecture. She was given Japanese yen as a thank you for the performance, which made her realize, "Oh, you can get paid just for singing? That's nice" and she has been hooked on singing ever since.

She was a self-described television addict growing up, and during her high school years she often stayed up watching live programming late into the night. This made her a habitual latecomer, and she was famously rarely on time for school. Ironically, her morning routine also included watching the preschool anime series Play with Mom! Pin Pon Pan, a show aimed at a much younger audience.

The highlight of her time at school was chapel time, as she would use it to practice her singing, focusing on the melody for the first verse of a hymn and on the harmony for the second.

She was a graduate of Soshin Jogakko Junior and Senior High School. Ever since she attended school as a student, she was interested in voice acting and singing, even taking vocal lessons at Yamaha's Vocal Mates during high school. Besides that, she joined the Yokohama Folk Village and would practice with her band.

As a high school student, she entered the Yamaha Popular Song Contest with a band she had founded with a group of friends and won the Outstanding Song Award.

During her high school years, everyone would tell her "you have a weird voice". To make the most of her "weird voice", she thought "maybe you should study acting", and started taking up acting. She loved anime and thought, "I'd love to try doing a voice like that." Since she had been taking lessons in singing, she thought it would be "the ultimate dream" if she could do voice acting and also perform the theme song.

Once Sakamoto graduated from high school, she wanted to start working as a voice actress, so contacted a friend who was a fan of voice actors to receive advice. She was asked "isn't there anything else you'd like to do?", to which she replied, "I think I might want to become a kindergarten teacher", and was then told, "well then, become a kindergarten teacher." Figuring she had to study, she thought "Since you end up joining a theater company anyway even if you join a university drama club, wouldn't it be better to go straight to a training school?", so planned on going to Waseda University through a recommendation and "study theater" there, but her homeroom teacher shot the idea down, telling her, "with as many times as you've been late, there's no way."

=== Career ===
After graduating from high school, she aspired to become an actress and joined the Theater Echo training institute after being inspired watching a performance of theirs. She chose Theater Echo because voice actors such as Kazuo Kumakura, Yasuo Yamada, and Ryūji Saikachi were a part of it at the time. After spending two years at the training institute, she planned on becoming a research student, but quit by force due to not finding acting very interesting and issues with market demand. Her first play was an absurdist work where she wound up putting no emotions into her lines. Some of her classmates at the training institute were Masako Katsuki and Kiyomi Hanasaki, with Mayumi Tanaka and Mari Yokoo being one year ahead of her.

She graduated from the training school and transferred to the Tokyo Actor's Consumer's Cooperative Society because of her strong desire to pursue a voice acting career. She then ended up joining Arts Vision at the time it founded. Sakamoto had also been formerly affiliated with Shinkikaku.

In 1981, she made her debut as a voice actress, with her first voice acting role performing the line "ah, it's Tetsujin!" in The New Adventures of Gigantor. Later, in 1982, she passed the audition for the title character of Fuku-chan in the anime Fuku-chan, landing her first lead role.

From October 1983 to March 1985, she served as the third main personality for the Animetopia radio program alongside Miki Takahashi. In 1983, she formed a group called "Kiran Gekijo" with friends and held performances twice a year and in 1984, formed a group known as "Potato Power" with Kiyomi Hanasaki and Akari Hibino, with the three of them holding concerts.

In 1989, Sakamoto was part of the GALLOP group with Kazue Ikura and Chie Kōjiro.

=== Current activity ===
In 2011, after a 20 year hiatus, GALLOP held a comeback concert, with Sakamoto, Ikura, and Kōjiro reuniting. Since then, the group has been active once every two years.

In October 2024, she, Kōichi Yamadera, Yuki Kaji, Ryūsei Nakao, Mika Kanai, and other prominent voice actors formed the "No More Unauthorized Generative AI" group to oppose AI-generated voices and videos created without consent. A series of videos featuring voice actors speaking their thoughts out on the usage of generative AI were released on October 21 as part of the campaign.

== Filmography ==
=== Television animation ===
List of voice performances in television animation
Year	Title	Role	Notes	Source
1981	The New Adventures of Gigantor	Additional voice	Eps 22, 28, 36; Debut voice acting role	
1982	Ninjaman Ippei	Negoro	Main role	
1982	Fuku-chan	Fuku-chan	Lead role	
1983	Cat's Eye	Ai Kisugi	Main role	
1983	Itadakiman	Ryuko		
1983	Nine	Yukimi Yasuda		
1983	Super Dimension Century Orguss	Lieea		
1983	Captain Tsubasa	Sanae Nakazawa		
1984	Urusei Yatsura	Ginger		
1985	Mobile Suit Zeta Gundam	Shinta		
1985	Princess Sara	Peter		
1986	Ginga: Nagareboshi Gin	Daisuke		
1986	High School! Kimengumi	Hisako Otonari		
1986	Maison Ikkoku	Kentarō Ichinose		
1986	Mobile Suit Gundam ZZ	Shinta		
1986	Pastel Yumi, the Magic Idol	Kenta Misawa		
1987	City Hunter	Horikoshi	Eps 16, 39	
1987	Norakuro-kun	Norakuro	Lead role	
1987	Kimagure Orange Road	Kazuya Kasuga		
1988	Let's Go! Anpanman	Tendonman, Chibizou-kun		
1989	Jungle Emperor	Meyer		
1989	Miracle Giants Dome-kun	Dome Shinjo		
1990	Tensai Bakabon	Hajime		
1990	Moomin	Teety-Woo		
1991	Anime Himitsu no Hanazono	Martha Phoebe Sowerby		
1992	Flower Witch Mary Bell	Tambourine	Main role	
1993	Muka Muka Paradise	Muka Muka		
1993	Calimero	Furufuru		
1994	Heisei Inu Monogatari Bau	Chicken	Ep. 21	
1995	Fushigi Yûgi	Nuriko, Houki		
1995	Juuni Senshi Bakuretsu Eto Ranger	Bakumaru		
1996	Baby and Me	Minoru Enoki		
1996	Hell Teacher Nūbē	Yukibe		
1996	Pretty Soldier Sailor Moon Sailor Stars	Yaten Kou/Sailor Star Healer		
1997	Chūka Ichiban!	Shirō		
1997	Pokémon	Obaba, Michael		
1998	Coro Coro Kuririn	Kuririn	Lead role	
1999	Cyborg Kuro-chan	Kuro, Prince Malo	Lead role; Malo in Ep. 59	
1999	Digimon Adventure	Agumon, Natsuko Takaishi		
2000	Digimon Adventure 02	Agumon, Natsuko Takaishi		
2001	Crush Gear Turbo	Jin Kyōsuke		
2001	Fighting Foodons	Zen Makunouchi		
2001	Pecola	Tsunekichi		
2001	Shaman King	Allen		
2002	Pecola	Tsunekichi		
2003	Origami Warriors	Arata Okimura		
2003	Ashita no Nadja	Jean		
2003	Machine Robo Rescue	Ricky		
2003	Mirmo!	Chikku		
2004	Pretty Cure	Koguma	Ep. 6	
2005	Digital Monster X-Evolution	WarGreymon X		
2006	Demashita! Powerpuff Girls Z	Piyo	Ep. 21	
2006	Saru Get You -On Air-	Specter, Kūta, Reporter		
2007	Great Detective Conan	Takumi Hashiratani	Ep. 462	
2007	Darker than Black	Misuzu Ōyama		
2008	Porphy no Nagai Tabi	Irma		
2009	Let's Go! Anpanman: Do Your Best Creampanda! The Christmas Adventure	Chibizou-kun	Television special	
2010	Digimon Xros Wars	Shoutmon, Agumon		
2010	HeartCatch PreCure!	Kaoruko Hanasaki/Cure Flower		
2011	One Piece	Young Jimbei, Young Stelly, S-Shark		
2011	Doraemon	Wani, Ichiro Abaraya		
2012	Humanity Has Declined	Fairy		
2013	Danchi Tomoo	Tetsuko Kinoshita	Main role	
2013	Toriko	Chiyo		
2015	Mysterious Joker	Hachi's mother	Ep. 23	
2016	JoJo's Bizarre Adventure: Diamond Is Unbreakable	Ken Oyanagi		
2017	Digimon Universe: Appli Monsters	Agumon	Ep. 45	
2017	Sazae-san	Additional voice		
2017	Hozuki's Coolheadedness	Shikimi	Ep. 24	
2018	Late Night! Genius Bakabon	Yoshida-kun		
2019	Puzzle & Dragons X	Devi	Ep. 5	
2020	Digimon Adventure	Agumon		
2021	Blue Period	Ryuji's Grandmother	Eps 5, 9	
2021	Fushigi Dagashiya Zenitendō	Koban, Shintaro, Abandoned Toy, Senmaru		
2021	Full Dive: This Ultimate Next-Gen Full Dive RPG Is Even Shittier than Real Life!	Maria	Ep. 9	
2026	Even a Replica Can Fall in Love	Taeko Mori	Eps 11-13	

=== Theatrical animation ===
List of voice performances in theatrical animation
Year	Title	Role	Notes	Source
1983	Nine	Yukimi Yasuda		
1984	Nausicaä of the Valley of the Wind	Boy		
1985	Night on the Galactic Railroad	Campanella		
1986	Captain Tsubasa: Asu ni Mukatte Hashire!	Sanae Nakazawa		
1986	Captain Tsubasa: Sekai Daikessen!! Jr. World Cup	Sanae Nakazawa		
1987	Pro Golfer Saru: Kōga Hikyō! Kage no Ninpō Golfer Sanjō!	Tobimaru		
1987	Bugtte Honey: Megalom Shōjo Mai 4622	Topo		
1988	Ultra B: Black Hole kara no Dokusaisha BB!!	B.B		
1988	My Neighbor Totoro	Mei Kusakabe		
1989	Let's Go! Anpanman: The Shining Star's Tear	Tendonman		
1989	Kiki's Delivery Service	Baby		
1992	Chibineko Tom no Daibōken - Chikyū o Sukue! Nakama-tachi	Tiki		
1995	Sailor Moon Supers: The Movie	Peruru		
1996	Pipi Tobenai Hotaru	Aari		
1996	Let's Go! Anpanman: The Flying Picture Book and the Glass Shoes	Tendonman		
2001	Digimon Adventure 02: Revenge of Diaboromon	Agumon		
2001	Digimon Tamers: Battle of Adventurers	Omegamon		
2001	Let's Go! Anpanman: Gomira's Star	Tendonman, Chibizou-kun		
2002	Ecchan no Sensō	Tatsuo Miyamoto		
2002	Crush Gear Turbo the Movie: Kaiservern's Ultimate Challenge	Kyousuke Jin	Short film	
2002	Ape Escape The Movie: Battle for the Golden Pipo Helmet	Specter	Short film	
2010	HeartCatch PreCure The Movie: Fashion Show in the Flower Capital... Really?!	Kaoruko Hanasaki		
2013	Pretty Cure All Stars New Stage 2: Friends of the Heart	Kage		
2014	Doraemon: New Nobita's Great Demon—Peko and the Exploration Party of Five	Chippo		
2015	Digimon Adventure tri.	Agumon		
2016	One Piece Film: Gold	Rikka		
2019	City Hunter: Shinjuku Private Eyes	Ai Kisugi		
2019	Tama & Friends: Tama and the Mysterious Stone Statue	Tora		
2019	Let's Go! Anpanman: Sparkle! Princess Vanilla of the Land of Ice Cream	Chibizou-kun		
2020	Digimon Adventure: Last Evolution Kizuna	Agumon		
2021	Let's Go! Anpanman: Fluffy Fuwari and the Cloud Country	Chibizou-kun		
2022	Let's Go! Anpanman: Dororin and the Transformation Carnival	Chibizou-kun		
2023	City Hunter The Movie: Angel Dust	Ai Kisugi		
2025	Let's Go! Anpanman: Chapon's Hero!	Chibizou-kun		
2025	Crayon Shin-chan the Movie: Super Hot! The Spicy Kasukabe Dancers	Ratel		

=== Original video animation (OVA) ===
List of voice performances in original video animation
Year	Title	Role	Notes	Source
1985	Leda: The Fantastic Adventure of Yohko	Yoni		
1991	Here is Greenwood	Shun Kisaragi		
1991	Slow Step	Chika Tanaka		
1994	Iria: Zeiram the Animation	Komimasa		
1996	Fushigi Yûgi OVA 1	Nuriko		
1997	Fushigi Yûgi OVA 2	Nuriko, Houki		
2001–02	Fushigi Yûgi Eikoden	Nuriko, Houki		
2004	Hydrangea Song	Chestnut Helper		
2008	Urusei Yatsura: The Obstacle Course Swim Meet	Ginger		

=== Original net animation (ONA) ===
List of voice performances in original net animation
Year	Title	Role	Notes	Source
2023	Lupin the 3rd vs. Cat's Eye	Ai Kisugi		

=== Video games ===
List of voice performances in video games
Year	Title	Role	Source
1995	Arc the Lad	Poco	
1996	Rockman 8	Clownman, Aquaman	
1997	Grandia	Milda	
1999	Ape Escape	Specter	
1999	Shenmue	Keika	
2002	Kaettekita Cyborg Kuro-chan	Kuro	
2010	Kingdom Hearts: Birth by Sleep	Huey, Dewey, and Louie	
2013	Digimon	Agumon, Greymon, MetalGreymon, WarGreymon	
2022	Digimon Survive	Agumon	

- Super Robot Wars series (????–????) (Kappei Jin, Lieea)

=== Tokusatsu ===
List of voice performances in tokusatsu
Year	Title	Role	Note	Source
1986	Morimori Bokkun	Bokkun		
1990	Chikyu Sentai Fiveman	Sairagin	Eps. 7, 19	
1993	Kyōryū Sentai Zyuranger Dino Video	Dino-kun		
1996	Ultraman Zearth	Digital Kanegon		
2008	Engine Sentai Go-Onger	Wameikle (Chibi)	Ep. 41	

=== Dubbing ===
==== Live-action ====
- Bad Santa – Thurman Merman (Brett Kelly)
- Baggage Claim – Gail Best (Jill Scott)
- The Crow – Sarah (Rochelle Davis)
- Fuller House – D.J. Tanner (Candace Cameron Bure)
- The Goonies (1988 TBS edition) – Lawrence "Chunk" Cohen (Jeff Cohen)
- The Man Who Knew Too Little – Lori (Joanne Whalley)
- Mrs. Harris Goes to Paris – Ada Harris (Lesley Manville)
- Near Dark (1990 TV Tokyo edition) – Homer (Joshua John Miller)

==== Animation ====
- Happy Feet Two – Atticus
- ¡Mucha Lucha! – The Flea
