= Eleceed =

South Korean manhwa series

일렉시드 RR: Illeksideu MR: Illeksidŭ
- Genre: Action; Fantasy
- Author: Jeho Son
- Illustrator: Zhena
- Webtoon service: Naver Webtoon (Korean); Line Webtoon,Inklore (Print) (English)
- Original run: October 2, 2018 – present
- Anime television series
- Directed by: Hiroshi Nishikiori
- Written by: Yōsuke Kuroda
- Music by: Taku Iwasaki
- Studio: Dandelion Animation Studio
- Licensed by: Crunchyroll
- Original run: April 2027 – scheduled

Eleceed (Korean: 일렉시드) is a South Korean manhwa released as a webtoon written by Jeho Son and illustrated by Zhena. It has been serialized on Naver Corporation's webtoon platform Naver Webtoon since October 2018. An anime television series adaptation produced by Dandelion Animation Studio is set to premiere in April 2027.

== Synopsis ==
Jiwoo Seo is a regular high schooler, who fears his power of super speed. One night, he finds an injured street cat, which is surprisingly capable of human speech. The cat introduces himself as Kayden Break and reveals the secret existence of Awakeners to Jiwoo. Thus begins Jiwoo's journey as an Awakener.

== Characters ==
Jiwoo Seo / Yu Kazahaya
Voiced by: Junya Enoki
A kind-hearted high schooler who loves street cats. He lives alone in Seoul, while his mother works as a scientist overseas. His Awakened ability is super speed, but acquires the electricity attribute under Kayden's tutelage. Hence the title, "Eleceed" (Electricity+Speed). He's very kind-hearted, and often makes friends with those he encounters.
Kayden Break / Kayden
One of the most dangerous and notorious Awakeners in the world, he is obsessed with battles and becoming stronger. His ambition is to fight the top 10 world rankers, the strongest Awakeners in the world. At the start of the story, he is injured by three of the top 10 world rankers, forcing him to flee to South Korea. He accidentally transforms into a fat street cat in an attempt to hide from his pursuers. Jiwoo discovers an injured Kayden and takes him home. Eventually, Kayden and Jiwoo's acquaintance evolves into a master and apprentice bond. Kayden's Awakened ability is electricity.
Jiyoung Yoo / Amane Yanagi
Voiced by: Shizuka Itō
She is the young and influential chairwoman of the Shinhwa Association, widely regarded as the strongest Awakener in South Korea. With her powerful command over wind, she holds significant authority in the Awakener world. As the protector of her jurisdiction, she often involves herself in matters of importance — including the well-being of Jiwoo Seo, the promising young Awakener living under her watch. Initially offering him support as a mentor and sponsor, Jiyoung's relationship with Jiwoo gradually evolves beyond simple duty. Subtle moments between them hint at a deepening emotional bond, suggesting that something more than just protection or guidance may be growing between the two.
Jisuk Yoo / Sota Yanagi
Voiced by: Hayato Dojima
Wooin / Jin Tatsuoka
Voiced by: Tasuku Hatanaka
Dr. Delein
Voiced by: Setsuji Satō
Kartein
Kartein is an awakened one. He is known for his ability to make impenetrable defense and heal almost any ailment or injury. However, he often denies treatment to awakened ones that seek him, even denying the most luxurious of payments.

== Production ==
The main character, Jiwoo Seo, was inspired by K-pop musician Kang Daniel.

== Media ==
=== Manhwa ===
Written by Jeho Son and illustrated by Zhena, the manhwa began serialization on Naver Webtoon on October 2, 2018. Line Webtoon has been publishing the series in English since 2019.

Penguin Random House imprint Inklore is set to publish the manhwa in print beginning in January 2027.

=== Anime ===
An anime television series adaptation was announced on July 1, 2025. It is set to be directed by Hiroshi Nishikiori and produced by Dandelion Animation Studio, with Yōsuke Kuroda writing the scripts, Minami Sakura designing the characters, and Taku Iwasaki composing the music. The series was originally scheduled for 2026, but was later delayed. It is set to premiere in April 2027. Crunchyroll will stream the series.

=== Video game ===
A mobile game based on the manhwa was announced in 2023. It is being developed by Action Square, with Naver Webtoon subsidiary Studio Lico set to publish it.

== Reception ==
In 2022, the series, along with Marry My Husband, garnered the most payments of any title on Naver Webtoon.

Emedo Ashibeze of Screen Rant liked the story and characters, particularly enjoying the development of the side characters. He also felt the main character's development was well-balanced.
