= Kenji Nakamura =

Japanese animation director

- Born: March 25, 1970 (age 56); Ogaki, Gifu Prefecture, Japan
- Occupation: Director

Kenji Nakamura (中村 健治 Nakamura Kenji; born March 25, 1970) is a Japanese anime director. He is best known for directing Mononoke, [C]: Controland Tsuritama.

== Career ==
After graduating from university, Nakamura worked as a salaryman for several years before entering the anime industry at Toei Animation. Originally an animator, he quit due to tendinitis and instead worked his way up the production process to become a director. He has since moved on to be a freelance director.

In March 2021, Twin Engine announced they were working with Nakamura on a new original anime, codenamed Yotogi

== Notable works ==
=== TV productions ===
- Kindaichi Case Files (1998, production assistance)
- Shinzo (2000, assistant director)
- The SoulTaker (2001, episode director)
- Yobarete Tobidete Akubi-chan (2002, episode director)
- The Big O (2003, episode director)
- Ayakashi: Samurai Horror Tales (2006, storyboard, episode director)
- Kemonozume (2006, script, storyboard, episode director)
- Mononoke (2007, series director)
- Hakaba Kitarō (2008, storyboard and unit director for OP, ED)
- Trapeze (2009, series director)
- C - Control (2011, series director)
- Tsuritama (2012, series director)
- Gatchaman Crowds (2013, series director)
- Gatchaman Crowds Insight (2015, series director)

=== OVA ===
- Karas (2005, storyboard, episode director)
- Iriya no Sora, UFO no Natsu (2005, storyboard, unit director)

=== Films ===
- Digimon: Diaboromon Strikes Back (2001, assistant director)
- Mononoke the Movie: Phantom in the Rain (2024, director)
- Mononoke the Movie: The Ashes of Rage (2025, director)
- Mononoke the Movie: The Curse of the Serpent (2026, director)

=== ONA ===
- Transformers: Combiner Wars (2016, director)
