= Mami Koyama =

Japanese actress and narrator (born 1955)

- 小山 茉美
- Born: January 17, 1955 (age 71); Nishio, Aichi, Japan
- Occupations: Actress; voice actress; narrator
- Years active: 1973–present
- Agent: Aoni Production
- Spouse: Tōru Furuya (m. 1976–1983)
- Website: Official profile

Mami Koyama (小山 茉美, Koyama Mami; born January 17, 1955) is a Japanese actress, voice actress and narrator affiliated with Aoni Production. Her best-known voice roles include Ophiuchus Shaina in Saint Seiya, Arale Norimaki in Dr. Slump, Minky Momo in Magical Princess Minky Momo, Lunch in Dragon Ball, Kaguya Ōtsutsuki in Naruto: Shippuden, Korosuke in Kiteretsu Daihyakka, Ryoko Mendo in Urusei Yatsura, and Charlotte Linlin (Big Mom) in One Piece, Vermouth in Detective Conan. Some of her notable roles in the 1990s and 2000s anime include Balalaika in Black Lagoon, Talia Gladys in Gundam Seed Destiny, Eva Heinemann in Monster, and Yōko Itoigawa in Hyōka. In feature films, she voiced Kei in Akira, and the adult Chiyoko Fujiwara in Millennium Actress.

== Biography ==
Mami Koyama was born in Nishio in Aichi Prefecture on January 17, 1955. She studied at both Aichi Konan College and at Hunter College for a short period, although did not graduate. In 1975, she earned a regular role as an actress in the TV drama "Kiyoko wa Naku Mon ka" (Kiyoko never cries). She moved to Tokyo and at the suggestion of a friend tried switching to voice acting, and earned a role in the 1975 show Ikkyū-san. She became affiliated with Aoni Production as her agency. She married fellow voice actor Tōru Furuya in 1976; the two had been coworkers at NHK Nagoya radio. The couple would divorce in 1983.

Koyama scaled back her voice acting activities in 1990, taking a long break and taking fewer roles afterward.

== Filmography ==
=== Anime ===
List of voice performances in anime
Year	Series	Role	Notes	Source
1975	Ikkyū-san	Yayoi Kikyoya (young)		
1976	Gaiking	Midori Fujiyama		
1976	Candy Candy	Annie Brighton	TV series	
1977	Wakusei Robo Danguard Ace	Miraa		
1977	Attack on Tomorrow	Mimi Hijiri		
1977	Arrow Emblem: Hawk of the Grand Prix	Ouse Suzuko		
1977–80	Lupin the Third Part II	Nina, Jeanne	Ep. 68, 95	
1978	Space Pirate Captain Harlock	Laura, Lucia, Shiraku	TV series	
1978	Haikara-san ga Tōru	Larissa		
1978	One Million-Year Trip: Bander Book	Mimuru		
1979	Anne of Green Gables	Minnie May Barry, Ruby Gillis		
1979	Mobile Suit Gundam	Kycilia Zabi		
1979	Isabelle of Paris; Pari no Isaberu	Isabel		
1979	Undersea Super Train: Marine Express	Millie		
1980	The Wonderful Adventures of Nils	Nils Holgerson		
1980	Maeterlinck's Blue Bird: Tyltyl and Mytyl's Adventurous Journey	Mytyl		
1980	X-Bomber	Lamia	ITV 1 Co-Production with Fuji Television	
1980	Space Runaway Ideon	Kiyaya Bufu		
1981–86	Dr. Slump	Arale Norimaki	1st series	
1981	GoShogun	Remy Shimada		
1981	Urusei Yatsura	Ryoko Mendo		
1981	Queen Millennia	Shinjo	TV series	
1982–83	Magical Princess Minky Momo	Minky Momo	1st anime series	
1982	Mysterious Cities of Gold	Zia		
1983	Lady Georgie	Catherine		
1984	Lupin III Part III	Maria	Ep. 48	
1984	Galactic Patrol Lensman	Clarisse Makudogaru		
1985	Magical Princess Minky Momo La Ronde in my Dream	Minky Momo	OVA	
1986–89	Dragon Ball	Lunch, Arale Norimaki		
1986	Wonder Beat Scramble	Lee		
1986	Maris the Chojo	Maris	OAV	
1986	Pelican Road	Okazaki Kanako		
1986	Ai City	K2	OVA	
1986	Anmitsu Hime	Anmitsu Hime		
1986–89	Saint Seiya	Shaina		
1987	Magical Princess Minky Momo Hitomi no Seiza Minky Momo SONG Special	Minky Momo	OVA	
1987–97	City Hunter series	Miki		
1987	The Plot of the Fuma Clan	Fujiko Mine	OAV	
1988	High School Agent	Sera	OAV	
1988–96	Kiteretsu Daihyakka	Korosuke		
1988	Vampire Princess Miyu	Se Himiko	OAV series	
1988	Legend of the Galactic Heroes	Jessica Edwards		
1989	Goku Midnight Eye	Yabuki Yohko		
1989	Riding Bean	Semmerling		
1989–96	Dragon Ball Z	Lunch		
1989	Fūma no Kojirō	Ranko Yagyū		
1989–91	Ariel	Mia Kishida	OAV series Visual and Deluxe	
1989	Osamu Tezuka Story: I am Son Goku	Kyoko Okamoto		
1990	Mu no Hakugei	La Mere		
1991	Oniisama e...	Fukiko "Miya-sama" Ichinomiya		
1991	Magical Princess Minky Momo Hold on to Your Dreams	Minky Momo (first)		
1993	Sailor Moon R	Green Esmeraude		
1993	Gunnm (renamed in the U.S. market as Battle Angel)	Chiren	OVA	
1994	Minky Momo The Station of Your Memories	Minky Momo (first)		
1995	World Fairy Tale Series	Narrator		
1996	Mobile Suit Gundam: The 08th MS Team	Karen Joshua		
1996–Today	Detective Conan	Vermouth		
1998	Devil Lady	Satoru		
1998	Silent Möbius	Mana Isozaki		
1998	Virgin Fleet	Kohka Hirose		
1998	Master Keaton	Marguerite	Ep. 22	
2000	Lupin III television specials	Cynthia	Ep. Missed by a Dollar	
2001	The Family's Defensive Alliance	Seiko Daichi		
2000	The Candidate for Goddess	Narrator, Rill Croford	Also OAV	
2001	Haré+Guu	Damas	Also OAV	
2001	Shaman King	Lilirara		
2001	Vampiyan Kids	Sue		
2002	Genma Wars	Princess Luna		
2002	The Twelve Kingdoms	Jyoei		
2002–08	Saint Seiya Hades	Shaina		
2002	Space Pirate Captain Herlock: The Endless Odyssey	Queen of the Ruins, Moon Princess	OAV	
2003	Air Master	Yuki Minaguchi		
2003	Ninja Scroll: The Series	Nubatama	TV series	
2004–05	Monster	Eva Heinemann		
2004	Mobile Suit Gundam SEED Destiny	Talia Gladys		
2004	Diebuster	Shop Owner	Ep. 1	
2005	Angel Heart	Miki		
2006	Ayakashi: Samurai Horror Tales	Oiwa Tamiya	Yotsuya Kaidan episodes	
2006	Black Lagoon	Balalaika		
2008	Casshern Sins	Leda		
2009	Fullmetal Alchemist: Brotherhood	Pinako Rockbell (young)		
2010	Rainbow: Nisha Rokubō no Shichinin	Naoko Yamauchi		
2010	Tegami Bachi: Reverse	Niche's sister		
2011	Nichijou	Manga manuscript paper	Ep. 20	
2011	Mai no Mahō to Katei no Hi	Hotaru		
2012–13	Saint Seiya Omega	Shaina		
2012	Hyōka	Yōko Itoigawa		
2014–15	Pretty Guardian Sailor Moon Crystal	Queen Serenity	ONA, Seasons 1-2 (Dark Kingdom and Black Moon arc)	
2015	Lance N' Masques	Tafei		
2016	Naruto Shippuden	Kaguya Ōtsutsuki		
2016	Dragon Ball Super	Arale Norimaki	ep. 43, 69	
2017, 2020	BanG Dream!	Shifune Tsuzuki	Seasons 1 and 3	
2017	One Piece	Charlotte Linlin (Big Mom)	Ep. 786-Current	
2018	Violet Evergarden	Alberta	Ep. 5	
2019	Dororo	Bandai	Ep. 2	
2019	The Promised Neverland	Grandma		
2021	Shaman King	Lilirara	Ep. 13	
2021	Ore, Tsushima	Miss Zun		
2022	Bastard!! -Heavy Metal, Dark Fantasy-	Anthrasax	ONA	
2023	The Ancient Magus' Bride	Liza Quillyn	Season 2	

=== Feature films ===
List of voice performances in feature films
Year	Series	Role	Notes	Source
1980	Toward the Terra	Karina		
1981	Doraemon: The Records of Nobita, Spaceblazer	Klem		
1981	The Sea Prince and the Fire Child	Malta		
1981–94	Dr. Slump films	Arale Norimaki	Also Abale-chan short in 2007	
1982	Queen Millennia	Shinjo		
1982	Andromeda Stories	Afuru		
1983	Harmagedon: The Great Battle with Genma	Princess Luna		
1984	Doraemon: Nobita's Great Adventure into the Underworld	Miyoko		
1985	Urusei Yatsura 3: Remember My Love	Ryoko Mendou		
1985	The Dagger of Kamui	Yuki		
1986	Dragon Ball: Curse of the Blood Rubies	Pasta		
1986	Phoenix: Ho-ō	Buchi		
1987	Dragon Ball: Sleeping Princess in Devil's Castle	Lunch		
1988	Dragon Ball: Mystical Adventure	Lunch, Arale Norimaki		
1988	Akira	Kei		
1989	Isewan Taifu Monogatari	Hikari		
1989	City Hunter: .357 Magnum	Miki		
1991	Magical Taruruto-kun	Nushiarde		
1996	City Hunter: The Secret Service	Miki	Television film	
1996	X	Karen Kasumi		
1997	City Hunter: Goodbye My Sweetheart	Miki	Television film	
1998	The 08th MS Team: Miller's Report	Karen Joshua		
1998	Mars Brigade Dana site 999.9	Photon		
1999	City Hunter: Death of Vicious Criminal Ryo Saeba	Miki	Television film	
2001	Metropolis	Enmy		
2001	The Siamese: First Mission	Naomi		
2002	Millennium Actress	Chiyoko Fujiwara (20-40s)		
2004	Appleseed	Athena Areios		
2006	Magical Witch Punie-chan	Esmeralda Tanaka		
2009	Case Closed: The Raven Chaser	Vermouth		
2009	Yona Yona Penguin	Coco's mother		
2016	Detective Conan: The Darkest Nightmare	Vermouth		
2019	City Hunter The Movie: Shinjuku Private Eyes	Miki		
2021	Pretty Guardian Sailor Moon Eternal: The Movie	Queen Serenity	2-Part film, Season 4 of Sailor Moon Crystal (Dead Moon arc)	
2021	Belle	Swan		
2023	City Hunter The Movie: Angel Dust	Miki		
2024	Blue Lock: Episode Nagi	Old Woman		
2024	Mononoke the Movie: Phantom in the Rain	Kayama		

=== Video games ===
List of voice performances in video games
Year	Series	Role	Notes	Source
1992	Snatcher	Metal Gear	PC Engine	
1996	4th Super Robot Wars Scramble	Saphine Grace, Remy Shimada	PlayStation	
1997	Super Robot Wars F	Remy Shimada	PlayStation, Sega Saturn	
1998	Dead or Alive	Tina Armstrong	PlayStation	
1999	Ore no Shikabane o Koete Yuke	Owa	PlayStation	
2005	Dragon Ball Z: Budokai 3	Lunch	PS1/PS2	
2006	Mobile Suit Gundam: Climax U.C.	Karen Joshua, Kycilia Zabi	PlayStation 2	
2006	Brave Story: New Traveler	Kutz		
2007	Dragon Ball Z: Budokai Tenkaichi 3	Arale Norimaki, Lunch		
2010	Valkyria Chronicles II	Clementia Foerster		
2010	God of War III	Hera		
2011	Valkyria Chronicles III	Clementia Foerster		
2012	Phantasy Star Online 2	Maria		
2015	Tales of Zestiria	Maltran		
2016	Naruto Shippuden: Ultimate Ninja Storm 4	Kaguya Ōtsutsuki	Playstation 4, Xbox One, Windows, Nintendo Switch	
2017	Xenoblade Chronicles 2	Queen Raqura		
2019	Fire Emblem Heroes	Hel		
2019	Jump Force	Kaguya Ōtsutsuki		
2024	Magia Record	Shi		

=== Audio dramas ===
List of dub performances in audio dramas
Series	Role	Notes	Source
Cutie Tenshi (Angel) Chougouka Yume no Saiten	Piyo chan		
Gunhed	Bebe		
Izumi Gensenki -Meidouhen-	Kurumigawa Midori		
Lips the Agent	Ai		
Silent Mobius: Mobius Collage	Isozaki Mana		
Silent Mobius: Silent Lovers	Isozaki Mana		

=== Overseas dubbing ===
List of dub performances in overseas productions
Title	Role	Voice dub for	Notes / Source
American Beauty	Carolyn Burnham	Annette Bening	
Bad Boys	Julie Mott	Téa Leoni	1999 Fuji TV edition
Battle of the Sexes	Gladys Heldman	Sarah Silverman	
Batman	Vicki Vale	Kim Basinger	
Beethoven	Alice Newton	Bonnie Hunt	
Beethoven's 2nd	Alice Newton	Bonnie Hunt	
Boomerang	Jacqueline	Robin Givens	
The Bourne Legacy	Pamela Randy	Joan Allen	
The Bourne Supremacy	Pamela Randy	Joan Allen	
The Bourne Ultimatum	Pamela Randy	Joan Allen	
Celebrity	Robin	Judy Davis	
Cobra	Ingrid Knudsen	Brigitte Nielsen	
Commando	Cindy	Rae Dawn Chong	
Dangerous Minds	LouAnne Johnson	Michelle Pfeiffer	
Death Race	Hennessy	Joan Allen	
Desperate Housewives	Mary Alice Young	Brenda Strong	
Dragonball: Evolution	Narrator	—N/a	
Fathers' Day	Collette Andrews	Nastassja Kinski	
Felicity	Sally Reardon	Janeane Garofalo	
The First Wives Club	Elise Eliot-Atchison	Goldie Hawn	
Galaxy Quest	Gwen DeMarco	Sigourney Weaver	
Highlander	Brenda Wyatt	Roxanne Hart	
Hollywoodland	Toni	Diane Lane	
Home Alone: The Holiday Heist	Jessica	Debi Mazar	
Identity	Caroline	Rebecca De Mornay	
Intersection	Olivia Marshak	Lolita Davidovich	
Jumper	Mary	Diane Lane	
Kill Bill: Volume 1	Oren Ishii	Lucy Liu	
Lorenzo's Oil	Mikera	Susan Sarandon	
Lucky Stars Go Places	Yum Yum	Maria Tung	
Miller's Crossing	Verna Bernbaum	Marcia Gay Harden	
Miracles	Yang Luming	Anita Mui	
Mr. Vampire	Jade	Pauline Wong	
Mrs. Doubtfire	Miranda	Sally Field	
Practical Magic	Gillian Owens	Nicole Kidman	
Raising Cain	Dr. Jenny O'Keefe Nix	Lolita Davidovich	
Raw Deal	Monique	Kathryn Harrold	1991 TV Asahi edition
Red Heat	Catherine "Cat" Manzetti	Gina Gershon	1990 TV Asahi edition
Romy and Michele's High School Reunion	Romy	Mira Sorvino	
The Day After Tomorrow	Lucy	Sela Ward	
The Long Kiss Goodnight	Samantha & Charlie	Geena Davis	
The Quick and the Dead	Ellen / The Lady	Sharon Stone	1997 TV Asahi edition
The Specialist	May Munro	Sharon Stone	
The Thieves	Chewing Gum	Kim Hae-sook	
Twin Dragons	Barbara	Maggie Cheung	
Twin Peaks: Fire Walk with Me	Laura Palmer	Sheryl Lee	
Up Close & Personal	Sally "Tally" Atwater	Michelle Pfeiffer	
What Lies Beneath	Claire Spencer	Michelle Pfeiffer	

List of dub performances in animation productions
Title	Role	Source
G.I. Joe: A Real American Hero	Scarlett	
WALL-E	Axiom's computer	

== Awards ==
- Anime Grand Prix: Most Popular Voice Actress of the Year (3): 1981, 1982, 1983
