= Taku Iwasaki =

Japanese composer and arranger (born 1968)

- Born: January 21, 1968 (age 58); Tokyo, Japan
- Occupations: Composer, arranger

Taku Iwasaki (岩崎 琢, Iwasaki Taku; born 21 January 1968) is a Japanese composer and arranger. His hometown is Tokyo, Japan. He is a graduate of Tokyo National University of Fine Arts and Music.

== Works ==
=== Anime ===
- The Irresponsible Captain Tylor (OVA series (theme songs composition, etc.); 1995, 1996)
- Now and Then, Here and There (1999)
- Rurouni Kenshin: Trust & Betrayal (1999)
- R.O.D -Read or Die- (2001)
- The SoulTaker (2001)
- Sadamitsu the Destroyer (2001)
- Rurouni Kenshin: Reflection (2001)
- Go! Go! Itsutsugo Land (2001)
- GetBackers (2002)
- Yokohama Kaidashi Kikou: Quiet Country Cafe (2002)
- Witch Hunter Robin (2002)
- R.O.D the TV (2003)
- Yakitate!! Japan (2004)
- Black Cat (2005)
- Angel Heart (2005)
- Binchō-tan (2006)
- Ōban Star-Racers (2006)
- Kekkaishi (2006)
- 009-1 (2006)
- Gurren Lagann (2007)
- Persona: Trinity Soul (2008)
- Soul Eater (2008)
- Black Butler (2009)
- Katanagatari (2010)
- C (2011)
- Heaven's Memo Pad (2011)
- Ben-To (2011)
- Jormungand (2012)
- JoJo's Bizarre Adventure: Battle Tendency (2012)
- Gatchaman Crowds (2013)
- Noragami (2014)
- The Irregular at Magic High School (2014)
- Akame ga Kill! (2014)
- Magic Kaito 1412 (2014)
- Gatchaman Crowds insight (2015)
- Noragami Aragoto (2015) with Kayo Konishi, Yukio Kondoo (MOKA☆) and ELECTROCUTICA
- Bungo Stray Dogs (2016–23)
- Qualidea Code (2016)
- Ulysses: Jeanne d'Arc and the Alchemist Knight (2018)
- Cop Craft (2019)
- White Cat Project: Zero Chronicle (2020)
- The Irregular at Magic High School: Visitor Arc (2020)
- Bungo Stray Dogs Wan! (2021–present)
- The Honor Student at Magic High School (2021)
- The Irregular at Magic High School: Reminiscence Arc (2022)
- Paradox Live the Animation (2023)
- Gachiakuta (2025–present)
- The Kept Man of the Princess Knight (2027)
- Eleceed (2027)
- Junket Bank (TBA)

=== Films ===
- Origin: Spirits of the Past (2006)
- Gurren Lagann the Movie: Childhood's End (2008)
- Gurren Lagann the Movie: The Lights in the Sky are Stars (2009)
- The Irregular at Magic High School: The Movie – The Girl Who Summons the Stars (2017)
- Bungo Stray Dogs: Dead Apple (2018)
- City Hunter: Shinjuku Private Eyes (2019)
- L.O.R.D: Legend of Ravaging Dynasties 2 (2020)
- Bungo Stray Dogs The Movie: Beast (2022)
- City Hunter: Angel Dust (2023)
- Shin Kamen Rider (2023)
- Mononoke the Movie: Phantom in the Rain (2024)
- Mononoke the Movie: The Ashes of Rage (2025)
- Mononoke the Movie: The Curse of the Serpent (2026)

=== Games ===
- Mercury - The Prime Master (1991) with Hayato Matsuo, Seirou Okamoto and Tsushi Yamaji
- Aerobiz (1992)
- Aerobiz Supersonic (1993)
- Kisō Louga (1993) with Hiroto Saitoh and Kayoko Maeda
- Kisō Louga II: The Ends of Shangrila (1995) with Hiroto Saitoh and Seiji Momoi
- Taikō Risshiden 2 (1995)
- Ai Cho Aniki (1995)
- Soul Edge (1995)
  - Soul Edge Original Soundtrack - Khan Super Session (1996) (tracks 9, 13 and 15)
- Cho Aniki: Kyuukyoku Muteki Ginga Saikyou Otoko (1995) with Koji Hayama, Don McCow and Sanae Kasahara
- Uncharted Waters Online (2004)
- Muv-Luv Alternative (2006)
- Lord of Vermilion IV (2017)
- Final Fantasy XV: Episode Ardyn (2019)
