= Twin Engine (company) =

Japanese anime production company

Twin Engine Inc.
- Native name: 株式会社ツインエンジン
- Romanized name: Kabushiki-gaisha Tsuin Enjin
- Type: Kabushiki-gaisha
- Industry: Anime planning and production
- Founded: October 1, 2014; 12 years ago
- Headquarters: Honshiochio, Shinjuku, Tokyo, Japan
- Area served: Worldwide
- Key people: Kōji Yamamoto (CEO); Shintaro Nemoto (Director); Masahiro Kanae (Director); Noboru Takahashi (Director); Naokado Fujiyama (Director); Kosuke Hosogai (Director, non-executive); Julien Vig (Director, non-executive)
- Products: Anime
- Number of employees: 458 (As of February 2026)
- Divisions: EOTA; Giggly Box
- Subsidiaries: Geno Studio; Pancake; Studio Colorido; Team Yamahitsuji; Studio Daisy; Peakys; Studio Kafka; Bug Films; NUT; Scooter Films; Outline; Quun Plant; Nagomi; Studio Chromato; Crew-Cell; Harerabo
- Website: https://twinengine.jp/

Twin Engine Inc. (Japanese: 株式会社ツインエンジン, Hepburn: Kabushiki-gaisha Tsuin Enjin) is a Japanese anime production company established in October 2014 by former Fuji TV's Noitamina Executive Editor Kōji Yamamoto.

== History ==
In September 2014, Kōji Yamamoto left Fuji TV after 14 years of working in the company and 10 years as Executive Editor in the late-night anime programming block Noitamina. Two months later, he established Twin Engine to work in the planning and production of anime and to also act as a network of animation studios, both in partnership and ownership.

In November 2015, Yamamoto established Geno Studio with the former Manglobe staff in order to complete the Genocidal Organ film, which was left incomplete due to Manglobe's bankruptcy. In 2016, Twin Engine established Twin Engine Digital Animation Studio, which mostly acts as a sub-contracting studio. Months later, Twin Engine established Relation Inc., a company that mainly deals with advertisement; around the same time, Twin Engine also formed animation studio Revoroot.

Aside from Geno Studio, Revoroot and Studio Colorido, which are subsidiaries of Twin Engine, other studios have also partnered with the company, such as Science Saru, Wit Studio, MAPPA, and Lay-duce, with the latter's CEO also belonging to Twin Engine's board of directors.

Since its establishment, Twin Engine worked in anime mainly with Fuji TV in the Noitamina programming block due to Yamamoto's previous relationship with the company, but since 2018, Twin Engine productions have not been exclusive to the block and have begun to be part of other TV stations.

In 2020, it established EOTA (Engine of the Animation) an internal organization and division within the company created to strength all of the group. It has members of all Twin Engine companies and the main company itself doing things such as building a system that allows multiple studios within the group to work together to produce animation, supplementing resources that are insufficient for a single studio (photography, art, etc.), back office operations such as accounting, legal affairs, and general affairs systems, support for launching new creative units and management of individual creators.

In 2021, it established two new anime studios: Scooter Films and Bug Films.

In 2022, Twin Engine, Amutus Corporation, BookLive and Tencent announced a capital tie up with each company helping each other and partnering for future projects to expand in their own respective areas.

In January 2024, the company established a new studio named Nagomi, having anime producer Fumio Kaneko as representative director and animators such as Satoru Fujimoto and Toru Imanishi as directors in the board. The company aims to create original anime and also work on licensed projects for other companies. In March 2024, it announced the establishment of Studio Chromato and Crew-Cell. Animator and director Shingo Yamashita is going to be the representative director of Studio Chromato, while producer Kazuki Enami will be the representative director of Crew-Cell.

In 2026, the animation studio NUT was acquired by Twin Engine, becoming part of the Twin Engine Group with the goal of strengthening production capabilities and its role in original IP development.

== Works ==
=== TV anime ===
- Psycho-Pass (2014) (Planning Cooperation)
- Kabaneri of the Iron Fortress (2016) (Chief Producer: Kōji Yamamoto)
- Scum's Wish (2017)
- Dive!! (2017) (Planning Cooperation)
- Kokkoku: Moment by Moment (2018) (Production)
- Golden Kamuy (2018–2020)
- Karakuri Circus (2018–19) (Production)
- Dororo (2019) (Production)
- Vinland Saga (2019–present) (Production)
- Babylon (2019) (Production)
- Pet (2020) (Production)
- I-Chu: Halfway Through the Idol (2021) (Production)
- Shine On! Bakumatsu Boys (2022) (Planning)
- Hell's Paradise: Jigokuraku (2023–present) (Production)
- The Ancient Magus' Bride - Season 2 (2023) (Production)
- Zom 100: Bucket List of the Dead (2023)
- My Deer Friend Nokotan (2024) (Production)
- Zenshu (2025) (Production)
- Your Forma (2025) (Production)
- Witch Hat Atelier (2026) (Production)
- Spirit Circle (2026) (Production)

=== Films ===
- Typhoon Noruda (2015) (Chief Producer: Kōji Yamamoto)
- Genocidal Organ (2017) (Chief Producer: Kōji Yamamoto)
- The Night Is Short, Walk On Girl (2017) (Chief Producer: Kōji Yamamoto; Planning Cooperation)
- Lu over the Wall (2017) (Chief Producer: Kōji Yamamoto; Planning Cooperation)
- Penguin Highway (2018) (Chief Producer: Kōji Yamamoto; Planning Cooperation)
- A Whisker Away (2020)
- Burn the Witch (2020)
- Drifting Home (2022)
- Kurayukaba (2024) (Distribution)
- Kuramerukagari (2024) (Distribution)
- Mononoke the Movie: Phantom in the Rain (2024)
- My Oni Girl (2024) (Planning, production, distribution)
- Mononoke the Movie: The Ashes of Rage (2025)
- Cosmic Princess Kaguya! (2026)
- Mononoke the Movie: The Curse of the Serpent (2026)
- The Ribbon Hero (2026)

=== ONA ===
- Pokémon: Twilight Wings (2020) (Production cooperation)
- Star Wars: Visions (2021) (Planning)
