= Ayakashi: Samurai Horror Tales =

Japanese anime television series

- Cover of the Blu-ray release by Discotek Media
- 怪 〜ayakashi〜 Japanese Classic Horror
- Genre: Horror, mystery, supernatural
- Created by: Nanboku Tsuruya IV (Yotsuya Kaidan); Kyōka Izumi (Tenshu Monogatari)
- Directed by: Tetsuo Imazawa (Yotsuya Kaidan); Kouzou Nagayama (Tenshu Monogatari); Kenji Nakamura (Bakeneko)
- Screenplay by: Chiaki J. Konaka (Yotsuya Kaidan); Yuuji Sakamoto (Tenshu Monogatari); Michiko Yokote (Bakeneko)
- Character designers: Yoshitaka Amano (Yotsuya Kaidan, original); Hideki Itō (Yotsuya Kaidan); Yasuhiro Nakura (Tenshu Monogatari); Takashi Hashimoto (Bakeneko)
- Music by: Yasuharu Takanashi
- Country of origin: Japan
- Original language: Japanese
- No. of episodes: 11

Production
- Editor: Kenta Katase
- Studio: Toei Animation
- Producers: Atsuya Takase; Atsutoshi Umezawa; Hiroaki Shibata; Yukihiro Itō; Kōji Yamamoto
- Production companies: Ayakashi Production Team (Note: Production committee consists of Toei Animation, Asmik Ace, Dentsu, SKY Perfect Well Think, Sony Music Entertainment, and Fuji Television)

Original release
- Network: Fuji TV (Noitamina)
- Release: January 13 – March 24, 2006

Related
- Succeeded by
- Mononoke (2007)

Ayakashi: Samurai Horror Tales, known in Japan as Ayakashi: Japanese Classic Horror (Japanese: 怪 〜ayakashi〜 Japanese Classic Horror), is a Japanese anime horror anthology television series produced by Toei Animation. The series tells collection of three classic Japanese horror stories: "Yotsuya Ghost Story" (Yotsuya Kaidan), an adaptation of the classic kabuki play by Nanboku Tsuruya IV, directed by Tetsuo Imazawa; "Goddess of the Dark Tower" (Tenshu Monogatari), based on the play by Kyōka Izumi and directed by Kouzou Nagayama; and "Goblin Cat" (Bakeneko), an original story by Kenji Nakamura and Michiko Yokote, with direction from the former. It aired on Fuji TV's Noitamina programming block between January 13 and March 24, 2006.

The series was formerly licensed by Geneon Entertainment, and later by Discotek Media. A spin-off series, titled Mononoke, centering the medicine seller from the "Goblin Cat" story, aired in 2007.

== Plot ==
=== Yotsuya Kaidan ===
- The story comprises four episodes, 1-4 (U.S. DVD release episodes 5-8).

"Yotsuya Ghost Story" is a retelling of the Yotsuya Kaidan, written by the 18th century kabuki playwright Nanboku Tsuruya IV. In the anime, Nanboku himself becomes the narrator.

Iemon Tamiya is a callous ronin samurai who desires a beautiful woman named Oiwa but is denied permission by her father. One dark night, Iemon kills her father. By coincidence, it is the same night that Iemon's servant, Naosuke, who is in love with Oiwa's adopted sister Osode, kills and disfigures who he believes is Satou Yomoshichi, Osode's fiancee. Iemon and Naosuke pose the bodies as if killed by bandits to allay suspicion. When the two bodies are discovered by Oiwa and Osode, the two men pretend to be surprised, and urge the two women that Oiwa should marry Iemon, while Osode should marry Naosuke, and convince them that the two men will take responsibility in exacting revenge on the "killers". Oiwa marries Iemon happily as they are in love while Osode is hesitant, but Naosuke suggests they be married in name only, and swears he will not consummate their marriage without her consent, to which she obliges.

Iemon marries Oiwa, but following the birth of their child, Oiwa takes ill and Iemon becomes tired of her and the burden of their poverty. In return for the promise of wealth and status, Iemon promises to marry Oume Ito, the granddaughter of the wealthy Kihei Ito, who is in love with Iemon. Because of her feelings for Iemon, she sends a medicine to Iemon's house claiming it is for Oiwa to help treat post-partum depression, when it is actually a toxin to permanently disfigure her face. Iemon, upon finding this out, is surprised but goes along with the scheme.

Iemon then orders his servant Takuetsu to rape Oiwa, so that they may divorce with his honor intact, and even goes so far as to suggest Takuetsu kills her if she becomes a problem, but when Oiwa discovers her husband's scheming plan, she dies accidentally from impalement while distraught. Iemon then kills a hapless servant and has his corpse, along with the dead Oiwa, nailed to a wooden panel which is tossed into the river to suggest they had been lovers attempting to elope. Iemon marries Oume as promised, but he is plagued by visions of Oiwa's vengeful spirit and kills his newlywed bride Oume on their wedding night. It is suggested that Oiwa laid a curse on the houses of Ito and Tamiya.

Meanwhile, Osode learns of Oiwa's death and agrees to consummate her marriage with Naosuke if he will take revenge for her. However, it is discovered that Satou Yomoshichi is still alive, and the one that Naosuke had killed was a body double (unknown to anyone since Naosuke had disfigured the corpse). Yomoshichi stumbles in on the couple whereupon Osode tricks the two men into killing her. Naosuke is given a note by the dying Osode, which reveals they share the same mother, meaning they are half-siblings by blood. Naosuke commits suicide in shame and as his dying wish, asks Yomoshichi to carry out Osode's wish for revenge on Iemon.

Iemon, up until this point, continues to see visions of Oiwa in her disfigured state, while those who caused Oiwa's misfortune die horrible deaths, including Kihei Ito and Iemon's parents. Iemon flees in desperation and is confronted by Satou Yomoshichi who finally kills him. It thus transpires that Oiwa's curse killed 18 members of the Tamiya and Ito family.

Nanboku Tsuruya then tells of misfortunes which have fallen on those who have staged the play, suggesting that it is the audience that continues to keep Oiwa's curse alive as they yearn for this story to be retold over and over again, while still maintaining that is still just a story.

Characters and cast

- Iemon Tamiya: An ambitious ronin samurai who desires Oiwa, but desires wealth and prestige even more. Voiced by: Hiroaki Hirata (Japanese); Brian Dobson (English)
- Oiwa Tamiya: A beautiful woman who is spurned and killed by her husband Iemon Tamiya. Voiced by: Mami Koyama (Japanese); Nicole Oliver (English)
- Osode Yotsuya: Oiwa's sister-in-law. Voiced by: Yūko Nagashima (Japanese); Rebecca Shoichet (English)
- Gonbei Naosuke: A servant who desires Osode and forces her to marry him, but later discovers she is his sister. Voiced by: Keiichi Sonobe (Japanese); Samuel Vincent (English)
- Oume Ito: Beautiful and spoiled granddaughter of the wealthy and powerful Kihei Ito. Voiced by: Ryō Hirohashi (Japanese); Lalainia Lindbjerg (English)
- Yomoshichi Sato: Suitor of Osode who thought that he had been killed by bandits. Voiced by: Wataru Takagi (Japanese); Michael Adamthwaite (English)

=== Tenshu Monogatari ===
- The story comprises four episodes, 5-8 (U.S. DVD release episodes 1-4).

"Goddess of the Dark Tower" is based on Tenshu Monogatari, a play by Kyōka Izumi. It tells the story of a forbidden love between a god and a human.

Prologue: group of bandits take shelter in a crumbling castle and are killed by spirits.

In medieval Japan, the falconer Zushonosuke Himekawa is sent by his master, Lord Harima, to retrieve a precious white falcon named Kojiro. His search leads him to a chance encounter with a beautiful woman bathing in a lake. She explains that she is a Wasuregami (Forgotten God) and kisses him.

When news reaches Lord Harima that the falcon has fled to the castle keep of Shirasagi-jo, Zushonosuke is ordered to go there to retrieve the falcon. Accompanied by two self-serving demons he enters the castle and again meets the woman who introduces herself as Tomi Hime (Princess Tomi), and tells him that the falcon is the spirit of her mother. They begin a forbidden romance and visit a nearby village. Zushonosuke asks her to live with him, but the Uma (matriarch) asks her to return to the castle. The presence of Zushonosuke causes a deterioration in the health of the Forgotten Gods community, including Tomi and she tearfully orders him to leave.

Zushonosuke returns home and marries his fiancée Oshizu. However Oshizu finds a comb from Yome, and she tells Lord Harima that the falcon is still at Shirasagi-jo. Harima orders the castle destroyed and Zushonosuke returns to it to warn Tomi just before Lord Harima's attack. Lord Harima's army is initially repelled, but because the castle's spirits are weakened by Tomi's relationship with Zushonosuke they begin to succumb. As the battle continues, Zushonosuke starts to become less human and eventually all but the two lovers die. Later, three white falcons are seen circling above the ruins of the castle.

Characters and cast

- Zushonosuke Himekawa: A falconer who serves Lord Harima and falls in love with Tomi Hime. Voiced by: Hikaru Midorikawa (Japanese); Kirby Morrow (English)
- Tomi Hime: A beautiful spirit which inhabits Shirasagi-jo and falls in love with Himekawa. Voiced by: Houko Kuwashima (Japanese); Willow Johnson (English)
- Oshizu: Himekawa's fiancee. Voiced by: Saeko Chiba (Japanese); Tracey Power (English)
- Ominaeshi: A spirit inhabiting Shirasagi-jo. Voiced by: Yui Kano (Japanese); Anna Cummer (English)
- Kaikaimaru: A demon. Voiced by: Kappei Yamaguchi (Japanese); Alec Willows (English)
- Kikimaru: A demon. Voiced by: Masaya Onosaka (Japanese); Samuel Vincent (English)

=== Bakeneko ===
- The story comprises three episodes, 9-11.

The episodes are presented like a three-act play, with sliding screens taking the place of curtains. The tale takes place in the Edo period, with Ukiyo-e style artwork.

Act one

Kusuriuri, a wandering medicine peddler, arrives at the house of the Sakai Clan on the wedding day of their daughter. The family accepted money for Mao to marry the impotent head of the Shiono Clan to clear their debts. Kusuriuri is unwelcome, but Kayo the maidservant allows him into the kitchen where he sees a rat and many rat traps but no cats.

As the family leave the house to meet the wedding escort, Mao dies mysteriously. Kusuriuri attaches paper ofuda (charms) on the wall, explaining that Mao's death was caused by a supernatural creature. However, Lord Katsuyama suspects the peddler who is seized and bound. A young samurai, Odajima Sakai, searches the Peddler's pack for poison, but finds a bejeweled sword which Kusuriuri explains it is a Taima for killing mononoke.

The house suddenly comes under a demonic attack and Kusuriuri casts paper wards on the walls to protect everyone. Kusuriuri explains that when he can discern the shape (katachi), truth (makoto) and motive (kotowari) of the demon, the sword of Taima will unsheathe and dispel it. Yoshikuni and Odajima find black cat hair revealing that the demon has the shape of a black cat (Bakeneko).

Act two

No one in the household will talk about the demon, but Kusuriuri makes a barrier of salt to stop it. Eventually, Kusuriuri finds that Sato bought cats so that the samurai could use them for testing the sharpness of their swords. Kusuriuri's devices detect the presence of the demon, and Lady Mizue becomes unhinged after grieving over her dead daughter which enables the demon to materialize, appearing as a woman in white surrounded by red cats who Mizue calls Tamaki. The demon consumes Katsuyama when he attacks it, but the rest are saved after Kayo throws a salt jar at it. The survivors flee to a secret room where they find a white wedding kimono, which turns blood red. Sato hysterically blames the aged Clan Lord Yoshiyuki for the cat demon attacks.

Final act

Lord Yoshiyuki confesses to Kusuriuri of an incident 25 years earlier when he kidnapped Tamaki, a beautiful sacrificial maiden whom he kept as his willing mistress, but she died young. As the cat demon breaks through the final barrier, Kusuriuri attempts to unsheathe his sword, but fails. The sword of Taima then opens its mouth and reveals the truth in a vision from the demon itself. Tamaki was not a pampered, willing mistress, but a caged and abused prisoner. During her imprisonment, Tamaki took in a kitten. When Yoshiyuki's elder son, Yoshikuni, attempted to rape her, he was caught by his father. Yoshiyuki savagely beat Tamaki, and the cat attacked Yoshiyuki in an attempt to protect Tamaki, but she died and her body was dumped in a nearby well by the young Sasaoka. The cat became a demon, regretting its failure to protect Tamaki from the suffering she faced at the hands of the Sakai.

With the shape, truth, and motive known, the sword of Taima unseals itself and Kusuriuri is able to draw it, revealing his true spirit-nature allowing him to exorcise the cat demon's grief and desire for vengeance. The demon returns to its dimension, Kusuriuri returns to his human form, and the aged corpse of Tamaki's cat appears on the floor of the secret room.

Post credits epilogue

The only remaining member of the clan, Lord Yoshiyuki is left to consider his actions which caused the bakeneko. Before leaving the household, Kayo and Odajima bury the cat next to the old well, which is Tamaki's grave. As Kusuriuri departs, he sees the happy spirits of Tamaki and her cat cross the threshold into the sunshine outside.

Characters and cast

- Kusuriuri: A Medicine Peddler and demon fighter. Voiced by: Takahiro Sakurai (Japanese); Andrew Francis (English)
- Kayo: A young servant girl who plays a prominent role in Kusuriuri's investigations. Voiced by: Yukana (Japanese); Kelly Sheridan (English)
- Odajima: A young samurai innocent of the events which created the cat demon. Voiced by: Tetsu Inada (Japanese); Trevor Devall (English)
- Clan Lord Yoshiyuki: The Clan lord who kidnapped a young sacrificial maiden, Tamaki, 25 years earlier and kept her captive. Voiced by: Chikao Ohtsuka (Japanese); Scott McNeil (English)
- Lord Yoshikuni: Older brother of Lord Yoshiaki and a lazy alcoholic so he was overlooked for the Sakai Clan succession. Voiced by: Naoki Tatsuta (Japanese); Paul Dobson (English)
- Lord Yoshiaki: Current head of the Sakai Clan, husband of Lady Mizue and father of Mao. Voiced by: Seiji Sasaki (Japanese); John Novak (English)
- Lady Mizue: Wife of Lord Yoshiaki and mother of Mao. Voiced by: Yōko Sōmi (Japanese); Alison Matthews (English)
- Lady Mao: Daughter of Lord Yoshiaki and Lady Mizue, and betrothed to the impotent head of the Shiono Clan. Voiced by: Kozue Kamada (Japanese); Tabitha St. Germain (English)
- Katsuyama: Manager of the Sakai household. Voiced by: Yuu Shimaka (Japanese); Ken Kramer (English)
- Sasaoka: An older samurai and Sakai Yonin of the house. Voiced by: Eiji Takemoto (Japanese); Andrew Kavadas (English)
- Miss Sato: One of the ladies of the Sakai Clan and collaborated in the mistreatment of Tamaki. Voiced by: Yurika Hino (Japanese); Tabitha St. Germain (English)
- Yahei: An old Sakai Clan servant. Voiced by: Kiyonobu Suzuki (Japanese); Trevor Devall (English)
- Tamaki: A beautiful young sacrificial maiden, who was captured by Clan Lord Yoshiyuki 25 years earlier and kept captive until he killed her.

== Broadcast and release ==
Ayakashi: Samurai Horror Tales was broadcast on Fuji TV as part of the Noitamina lineup from January 13, 2006, to March 24 of the same year. The opening theme song "Heat Island" is performed by Rhymester, while the ending theme "Haru no Katami" (春のかたみ) is performed by Hajime Chitose.

A spin-off series based on the character of the medicine seller, titled Mononoke, aired in 2007.

In North America, the series was first licensed by Geneon Entertainment. The series was released on 3 DVD volumes from May 1 to September 4, 2007. Discotek Media announced the acquisition of the series in May 2019, and it was released on Blu-ray on October 29 of the same year. In Australia, the series was licensed by Siren Visual in 2012, and released on DVD on January 24, 2013.
