= Eiji Takemoto =

Japanese voice actor

- 竹本 英史
- Born: March 7, 1973 (age 53); Shūnan, Yamaguchi, Japan
- Occupation: Voice actor
- Years active: 1993–present
- Agent: Aoni Production

Eiji Takemoto (竹本 英史, Takemoto Eiji; born March 7, 1973) is a Japanese voice actor. His name is sometimes mistranslated and also sometimes credited as being Hidefumi Takemoto (竹本 英文, Takemoto Hidefumi). His nickname is Takepon. He works at Aoni Production, and enjoys watching Japanese found footage films.

== Filmography ==
=== Anime series ===
1990s

- Papuwa (1993) (Musha Kōji, Oshōdani)
- Beast Wars II: Super Life-Form Transformers (1998) (Dirge (Dassault Rafale)/Dirgegun (Cyborg Bee), Motorarm (Rhinoceros Beetle) (Movie))
- Super Life-Form Transformers: Beast Wars Neo (1999) (Bump (Armadillo))
- Hunter × Hunter (1999) (Uvogin), Kiriko, Umori, Kamuri, Bourbon, Bodoro, Assassin A
- Ojarumaru (1999) (Hiraki Hoshiemon)

2000s

- Yu-Gi-Oh! Duel Monsters (2000) (Rare Hunter, Kogoro Daimon)
- Bomberman Jetters (2002) (Thunder Bomber)
- The Prince of Tennis (2002) (Renji Yanagi, Kiichi Kuki)
- Ultimate Muscle: The Kinnikuman Legacy (2002) (Warsman, Ataru Kinniku)
- Bobobo-bo Bo-bobo (2003) (King Nosehair, Zeb Ziegler)
- One Piece (2003) (Roshio, Ohm, John Giant (Ep. 294), Doberman, Nin, Gentleman Hippo, Yorki, Motobaro, X Drake, Comil, Daigin)
- Jubei-chan: The Ninja Girl (2004) (Shimodaira Tappei)
- Legendz (2004) (J1, Salamander)
- Yu-Gi-Oh! Duel Monsters GX (2004) (Mei)
- Eyeshield 21 (2005) (Jo Tetsuma, Daigo Ikari)
- Onegai My Melody (2005) (King Elephant)
- Ginga Legend Weed (2005) (Kagetora, Shigure)
- Digimon Savers (2006) (BanchouLeomon)
- Bleach (2007) (Aisslinger Wernarr)
- Les Misérables: Shōjo Cosette (2007) (Courfeyrac)
- Princess Resurrection (2007) (Riza's brother Lobo Wildman)
- Dragon Ball Kai (2009) (Kewi)

2010s

- HeartCatch PreCure! (2010) (Kumojacky)
- Bakugan Battle Brawlers: Gundalian Invaders (2011) (Linehalt)
- Chibi Maruko-chan (2011) (Masao Maruyama)
- Mobile Suit Gundam AGE (2012) (Seric Abis)
- Saint Seiya Omega (2012) (Perseus Mirfak, Titan)
- Akame ga Kill! (2014) (Bols)
- Gonna be the Twin-Tail!! (2014) (Alligator Guildy)
- World Trigger (2014) (Katsumi Karasawa, Tetsuji Arafune)
- Samurai Warriors (2015) (Ishida Mitsunari)
- Charlotte (2015) (Kumagami)
- Seiyu's Life! (2015) (Sound Director of Budha Fighter Bodhisattvon)
- Scared Rider Xechs (2016) (Fernandes)
- Dragon Ball Super (2017) (Bergamo)
- Dame x Prince Anime Caravan (2018) (Chrom)
- Golden Kamuy (2018) (Hajime Tsukishima)
- Demon Slayer: Kimetsu no Yaiba (2019) (Kozo Kanamori)

2020s

- Darwin's Game (2020) (Banda-kun)
- That Time I Got Reincarnated as a Slime (2024) (Arnaud)
- Gag Manga Biyori (2025) (Imoko Omono)
- Jujutsu Kaisen (2026) (Haba)

=== Original video animation ===
- Hunter × Hunter (2002) (Uvogin)
- Hunter × Hunter: Greed Island (2003) (Gashta Bellam, Motaricke
- Hunter × Hunter: Greed Island Final (2004) (Kiriko, Motaricke, Gashta Bellam, Zetsk Bellam
- Saint Seiya: The Hades Chapter (2005) (Harpy Valentine)
- Tales of Symphonia The Animation (2005) (Altessa)

=== Anime films ===
- Princess Arete (2001) (Dullabore)
- One Piece The Movie: Dead End no Bōken (2003) (Drake)
- One Piece: The Cursed Holy Sword (2004) (Drake)
- Mai Mai Miracle (2009) (Tosuke Aoki)

=== Web animation ===
- The King of Fighters: Another Day (2005) (Rock Howard)
- Sailor Moon Crystal (2014) (Kunzite)
- Super Crooks (2021) (TK McCabe)

=== Video games ===
- Gyakuten Saiban series promos (????) (Miles Edgeworth/Reiji Mitsurugi)
- Harukanaru Toki no Naka De 5 (????) (Fukuchi Ouchi)
- Garou: Mark of the Wolves (1999) (Rock Howard)
- The King of Fighters 2000 (2000) (Ramón)
- Capcom vs. SNK: Millionaire Fighting 2001 (2001) (Rock Howard)
- The King of Fighters 2001 (2001) (Ramón)
- The King of Fighters 2002 (2002) (Ramón)
- Galactic Wrestling (2004) (Neptuneman/Quarrelman)
- The King of Fighters: Maximum Impact (2004) (Rock Howard)
- Neo Geo Battle Coliseum (2005) (Rock Howard)
- The King of Fighters: Neowave (2004) (Ramón)
- Dragon Force PS2 remake (2005) (Wein of Highland)
- The King of Fighters XI (2005) (Ramón)
- Sengoku Musou 2 (2006) (Ishida Mitsunari, Shibata Katsuie)
- Kinnikuman Muscle Generations (2006) (Neptuneman/Quarrelman, Kendaman)
- KOF: Maximum Impact 2 (2006) (Rock Howard)
- Dragon Ball Z: Budokai Tenkaichi 3 (2007) (Nam)
- Tales of Vesperia (2008) (Raven)
- Dragon Ball: Origins (2008) (Nam)
- Sengoku Musou 3 (2009) (Ishida Mitsunari, Shibata Katsuie)
- Dragon Ball Z: Tenkaichi Tag Team (2010) (Kewi)
- Dragon Ball: Origins 2 (2010)
- Dragon Ball: Raging Blast 2 (2010) (Kewi)
- Professor Layton vs. Phoenix Wright: Ace Attorney (2012) (Miles Edgeworth/Reiji Mitsurugi)
- Phoenix Wright: Ace Attorney − Dual Destinies (2013) (Miles Edgeworth/Reiji Mitsurugi)
- Sengoku Musou 4 (2014) (Ishida Mitsunari, Shibata Katsuie)
- Project X Zone 2 (2015) (Miles Edgeworth/Reiji Mitsurugi)
- Phoenix Wright: Ace Attorney − Spirit of Justice (2016) (Miles Edgeworth/Reiji Mitsurugi)
- Musou Stars (2017) (Ishida Mitsunari)
- God Eater Resonant Ops (2018) (Crow Ranchester)
- Atelier Ryza 2: Lost Legends & the Secret Fairy (2020) (Clifford Diswel)
- Dragon Ball Z: Kakarot (2020) (Kewi, Nam)

=== Tokusatsu ===
- Hyakujuu Sentai Gaoranger (2001) (Duke Org Rouki (eps. 14 - 23, 26))
- Mahou Sentai Magiranger Vs. Dekaranger (2006) (Agent X/Hades Beastman Apollos of Demon)
- Engine Sentai Go-onger (2008) (Cleaning Minister Kireizky (ep. 43 - 44))
- Kamen Rider Fourze (2011) (Zodiarts (eps. 2 - 14, 18), Zodiarts Switch Voice (ep. 2, 4, 6, 8, 10, 12, 15, 17, 20, 22, 24, 26, 30))
- Zyuden Sentai Kyoryuger (2013) (Debo Viruson (ep. 5 - 6, 21 - 22, 36), Debo Viruson (ep. 22))
- Doubutsu Sentai Zyuohger (2016) (Jagged (ep. 1, 13)
- Kaitou Sentai Lupinranger VS Keisatsu Sentai Patranger (2018) (Ushibaroque the Brawl (ep. 23))
