= List of Slam Dunk chapters =

Cover of Slam Dunk volume 1 as published by Raijin Comics on July 2, 2003

The Japanese manga series Slam Dunk was written and illustrated by Takehiko Inoue. The story follows Hanamichi Sakuragi, who becomes a basketball player from the Shohoku High School basketball team in order to make Haruko Akagi, a girl he likes, fall in love with him. However, as he learns more about basketball and plays several games, he starts liking the sport.

The series was originally published in Shueisha's Weekly Shōnen Jump since the issue 40 from 1990 until the issue 27 from 1996. The 276 individual chapters were originally collected in 31 tankōbon editions under Shueisha's Jump Comics imprint, with the first volume being published on February 8, 1991 and volume 31 on October 3, 1996. It was later reassembled in 24 kanzenban volumes from March 19, 2001 to February 2, 2002. A 20 volume shinsōban edition was published between June 1, 2018, and September 1, 2018. In 2004, Inoue produced an epilogue titled Slam Dunk: 10 Days After, which was drawn on 23 chalkboards in the former campus of the now-defunct Misaki High School located in the Kanagawa Prefecture, which was held for public exhibition from December 3 to December 5. The epilogue, along with coverage of the event, was reprinted in the February 2005 issue of Switch magazine.

In North America, an English version of Slam Dunk was published by the now-defunct Gutsoon! Entertainment, which serialized the title in their manga anthology Raijin Comics from 2002 to 2004. Five collected volumes were published under Gutsoon's Raijin Graphic Novels imprint. They were released from July 2, 2003, until May 5, 2004. After Gutsoon! went out of business, the license for the Slam Dunk was purchased by Viz Media, which published a preview of the series in the December 2007 issue of the North American edition of Shonen Jump. Slam Dunk began serialization in the magazine, starting with the May 2008 issue, as well as in tankōbon format with the first being published on September 2, 2008. As of December 3, 2013, Viz has released all thirty-one volumes of the series.

== Volumes ==
No.	Title	Original release date	English release date
1	Sakuragi 桜木君	February 8, 1991; 978-4-08-871611-4	July 2, 2003 (Gutsoon); September 2, 2008 (Viz); 978-0-9725037-9-2 (Gutsoon); 978-1-4215-0679-1 (Viz)
001. "Sakuragi" (桜木君); 002. "Kaede Rukawa" (流川楓だ, Rukawa Kaede); 003. "Blood"; 004. "The Gorilla" (ゴリラジジイ, Gorirajijii); 005. "For Love I Will Prevail!" (愛は勝つ, Ai wa Katsu); 006. "Jam!"; 007. "I am Basketballman" (I'm バスケットマン, I'm Basuketto Man); 008. "Hanamichi Joins the Team" (花道入部, Hanamichi Nyūbu); 009. "Fundamentals" (基本が大事, Kihon ga Daiji)
Hanamichi Sakuragi is unpopular with girls, and begins hating basketball in middle school, when his latest crush is in love with a basketball player. However, in high school he suddenly falls in love with Haruko Akagi who notes that he could be a remarkable basketball player after teaching him how to slam dunk. While listening to Haruko's explanations, Sakuragi's gang comes to suspect that she might be in love with a basketball player named Kaede Rukawa. Haruko confesses this to Sakuragi, which depresses him once again. A group of third year students challenge Sakuragi and his gang to a fight, but just when they are about to face them Sakuragi finds them defeated singlehandedly by Rukawa. Haruko sees a wounded Rukawa next to Sakuragi and blames the latter for Rukawa's injuries. Once again depressed, Sakuragi gets into a fight with the Shohoku basketball team captain, Takenori Akagi, who challenges him to a basketball game, in which Sakuragi has to make one basket before Akagi makes ten. With Sakuragi down nine to zero, he notices Haruko has come to watch along with the rest of the school, and is able to score with an improvised slam dunk. Afterwards, Sakuragi learns that Akagi is Haruko's older brother and decides to join the basketball team to get closer to Haruko and surpass Rukawa. Sakuragi's persistence earns him a spot on the team, but he is forced to learn the basics as he has no prior playing experience. After a week of this, Sakuragi confronts Akagi in frustration, but Akagi is adamant that he continue his instruction. Unable to accept this, Sakuragi decides to quit the team.
2	New Power Generation	June 10, 1991; 978-4-08-871612-1	September 23, 2003 (Gutsoon); February 3, 2009 (Viz); 978-1-932454-04-8 (Gutsoon); 978-1-4215-1984-5 (Viz)
010. "Afternoon of the Coward" (根性なしの午後, Konjō Nashi no Gogo); 011. "The White-Haired Buddha" (白髪仏, Hakuhatsu Hotoke); 012. "Battle of the Real Deals" (本物対決, Honmono Taiketsu); 013. "Sky-Walker"; 014. "New Power Generation"; 015. "One Rainy Day" (ある雨の日, Aru Ame no Hi); 016. "Talent" (実力者, Jitsuryokusha); 017. "Judo-Man" (柔道男, Jūdō Otoko); 018. "What I Am"
Sakuragi rethinks his decision and returns to the basketball team, although he is still forced to learn the basics. Some time later, coach Mitsuyoshi Anzai arrives after arranging a practice match against Ryonan High School, and he sets up a match between the first years and other players. Sakuragi is not allowed to play, but he is amazed at seeing Akagi and Rukawa's abilities. With minutes left in the match, Anzai allows Sakuragi to join the first year team. Sakuragi seizes the opportunity to attempt a slam dunk, but misses and dunks the ball on Akagi's head, which attracts Anzai's notice. Following this practice match, Tatsuhiko Aota, the captain of the Shohoku judo team and a childhood friend of Akagi, notices Sakuragi's fighting skills and attempts to lure him away from the basketball team to join the judo team. Sakuragi decides to meet with Aota after noticing that Haruko is very familiar with him. Aota reveals his rivalry with Akagi and that he has been in love with Haruko since they were younger, and attempts to use photographs of a younger Haruko as a bribe to make Sakuragi join. Sakuragi, however, stubbornly refuses to join the judo team and fights Aota for the photos. When asked by Aota why he refuses to quit the basketball team, Sakuragi declares it is because he is a basketball player.
3	The Challenge of the Common Shot; Shomin no Shūto wa Muzukashii (庶民のシュートは難しい)	July 10, 1991; 978-4-08-871613-8	January 6, 2004 (Gutsoon); April 7, 2009 (Viz); 978-1-932454-10-9 (Gutsoon); 978-1-4215-1985-2 (Viz)
019. "Gleeful Gorilla" (ゴリ上機嫌, Gori Jōkigen); 020. "The Challenge of the Common Shot" (庶民のシュートは難しい, Shomin no Shūto wa Muzukashii); 021. "The Touch (その感覚, Sono Kankaku); 022. "The Scout" (「要チェックや」, Yō Chekku Ya); 023. "Not Your Average Joe" (ただ者じゃない男, Tadamono Ja Nai Otoko); 024. "The Day Before Tomorrow" (明日の前の日, Ashita no Mae no Hi); 025. "Destiny's Duo" (因縁の二人, Innen no Ninin); 026. "The Secret Weapon" (秘密兵器と呼ばれて, Himitsu Heiki to Yobarete)
Akagi starts teaching Sakuragi how to do a layup. As Sakuragi fails every attempt, Rukawa is asked to demonstrate, which ends in a fight instigated by Sakuragi. The next morning, Haruko finds Sakuragi in the park still trying to make a layup. After various failed attempts, Haruko explains to Sakuragi that he needs to use less force with his hands, which allows him to make a successful shot. While training at night in the gym, Sakuragi meets Hikoichi Aida, a first year player from Ryonan, who is convinced by Sakuragi that he, not Rukawa, is the new best player from Shohoku. The night before the practice match against Ryonan, Akagi teaches Sakuragi how to rebound. At Ryonan, Sakuragi is not selected as a starter for the match but is reassured by Anzai who tells him that he is "the secret weapon".
4	Enter the Hero!! Shuyaku Tōjō!! (主役登場!!)	August 7, 1991; 978-4-08-871614-5	January 6, 2004 (Gutsoon); June 2, 2009 (Viz); 978-1-932454-16-1 (Gutsoon); 978-1-4215-1986-9 (Viz)
027. "Captain All Fired Up" (燃えるキャプテン, Moeru Kyaputen); 028. "Raging Ryonan" (ドトウの陵南, Dotō no Ryōnan); 029. "High School High Class" (超高校級, Chō Kōkō Kyū); 030. "Counterattack"; 031. "Anticipation" (うずうず, Uzuuzu); 032. "Loose Cannon" (危険人物, Kiken Jinbutsu); 033. "Palpitations" (ドキドキ, Fokidoki); 034. "Enter the Hero!!" (主役登場 !!, Shuyaku Tōjō!!); 035. "Who is this Guy?" (なんだコイツは, Nanda Koitsu wa)
The match between Shohoku and Ryonan starts, with the latter taking the upper hand thanks to its ace, second year player Akira Sendoh, and the center, captain Jun Uozumi, who manage to shut down Rukawa and Akagi, respectively. Nevertheless, Rukawa and Akagi are able to eliminate Ryonan's lead. Meanwhile, Sakuragi continues pestering Anzai to let him enter the game, but he is tied to a chair as a result of bothering the Ryonan coach, Moichi Taoka, and attempting to spy on the Ryonan team. During the second half Uozumi accidentally elbows Akagi, which allows Sakuragi to be substituted in. Nervous about playing in his first match, Sakuragi makes several mistakes until finally Rukawa kicks him out of the game in an attempt to calm him down. Uozumi then learns from Hikoichi that Sakuragi once defeated Akagi and wants to see if it is true. As Uozumi prepares to shoot, Sakuragi blocks his shot.
5	Rebound	October 9, 1991; 978-4-08-871615-2	May 5, 2004 (Gutsoon); August 4, 2009 (Viz); 978-1-932454-26-0 (Gutsoon); 978-1-4215-1987-6 (Viz)
036. "Taoka's Miscalculation" (田岡の誤算, Taoka no Gosan); 037. "When Gori's Away..." (ゴリのいぬ間に, Gori no Inu Kan ni); 038. "Rebound"; 039. "Trouble in the Rebound King's Court" (リバウンド王の苦悩, Ribaundo Ō no Kunō); 040. "Wrong!" (ちが〜〜〜〜う, Chiga〜〜〜〜u); 041. "Genius" (天才, Tensai); 042. "Winners Will Not Be Denied" (負けず嫌いは止まらない, Makezugirai wa Tomaranai); 043. "The Last Two Minutes" (ラスト2分, Rasuto 2 Fun); 044. "Sendoh" (仙道君です, Sendō-kun Desu; 'I'm Sendoh')
Sakuragi steals the ball from Uozumi, and Shohoku's vice-captain Kiminobu Kogure and Rukawa manage to score several times, allowing Shohoku to catch up to Ryonan. Sakuragi uses what Akagi taught him, allowing him to stop all of Ryonan's players, except Uozumi. Akagi then returns to the match, but decides to substitute Rukawa to give him rest. Akagi and Kogure continue to score, allowing Shohoku to take the lead for the first time in the game. However, Sendoh then retakes the lead for Ryonan with Sakuragi being unable to stop him. Rukawa returns to play, but Anzai tells him and Sakuragi to join forces to block Sendoh. Sendoh manages to break their defense, and the Ryonan maintains a four point lead.
6	Nothing to Lose	December 3, 1991; 978-4-08-871616-9	October 6, 2009 (Note: Volume 6 onwards' English dates and ISBN refer to the Viz Media publication.); 978-1-4215-1988-3 (Note: Volume 6 onwards' English dates and ISBN refer to the Viz Media publication.)
045. "Unbelievable"; 046. "No Time"; 047. "The Bus Driver" (勝利を呼ぶ男, Shōri o Yobu Otoko); 048. "Nothing to Lose"; 049. "Basketball Shoes" (バッシュ, Basshu); 050. "The Late Arrival" (遅れてきた男, Okurete Kita Otoko); 051. "Super Problem Child" (スーパー問題児, Sūpā Mondaiji); 052. "An Incident" (事件, Jiken); 053. "A Bad Feeling" (イヤな予感, Iya na Yokan)
In the last minute of the match, Rukawa and Sakuragi accidentally pass the ball to each other and both score. Shohoku takes the lead, but in the last 20 seconds Sendoh scores two points all by himself, and the match ends with Ryonan's victory. Although Shohoku loses, they impress the audience as they gave Ryonan, one of the best teams in the prefecture, a close game. The next day, Sakuragi's gang encounter Ryota Miyagi, who gets rejected by a girl, as he is about to return to the basketball team. Miyagi is attacked by a group of delinquents led by a student named Hisashi Mitsui, but they lose his attention when Miyagi sees Sakuragi walking with Ayako, who Miyagi likes. Thinking they are a couple, Miyagi attacks Sakuragi, but both accidentally knock Mitsui out. Miyagi and Sakuragi are easily stopped by Ayako and Haruko, but when Miyagi appears in the basketball gym, Sakuragi challenges him to a basketball game.
7	The End of the Basketball Team; Basuke-bu Saigo no Hi (バスケ部最後の日)	March 10, 1992; 978-4-08-871617-6	December 1, 2009; 978-1-4215-2862-5
054. "He's a Jerk, But..." (やな奴だけど, Yanayatsu Dakedo); 055. "Punks" (不良, Furyō); 056. "Shoes On" (土足, Dosoku); 057. "So Sticky!"; 058. "The End of the Basketball Team" (バスケ部最後の日, Basuke-bu Saigo no Hi); 059. "Burst"; 060. "So What?" (それがどうした, Sore ga Dōshita); 061. "Evening the Odds" (正義の味方, Seigi no Mikata); 062. "Sakuragi's Posse" (桜木軍団, Sakuragi-gundan)
Sakuragi and Miyagi begin playing a one-on-one basketball game, but it quickly devolves into fighting. Akagi hits both of them to stop the fight, but Sakuragi notices Miyagi is in love with Ayako. That night, Sakuragi asks Miyagi about Ayako, and Miyagi explains that he joined the basketball team to get Ayako to fall in love with him, but he has failed to win her affection. Realizing that they are both in the same situation, Sakuragi reveals his empathy with Miyagi. The next day Mitsui goes with his gang to Shohoku to take revenge on Miyagi. They beat up Miyagi then start to attack the other players. Rukawa tries to fight, but as he is asked to stop, Tetsuo, an adult member of Mitsui's gang, knocks him out. When Ayako is hit by one of them, Miyagi furiously attacks the delinquent but is injured by Tetsuo. Sakuragi then attacks Mitsui and starts fighting Tetsuo. Sakuragi's gang then arrives and starts fighting Mitsui's gang.
8	Basketball	June 10, 1992; 978-4-08-871618-3	February 2, 2010; 978-1-4215-2863-2
063. "And Don't Come Back" (「2度と来ない」, Nido to Konai); 064. "Mitsui" (三井); 065. "Take Your Shoes Off" (靴を脱げ, Kutsu o Nuge); 066. "MVP"; 067. "A National Title" (全国制覇, Zenkoku Seiha); 068. "Hisashi Mitsui at 15" (三井寿15歳, Mitsui Hisashi Jūgo-sai); 069. "Wish"; 070. "It Doesn't Hurt" (痛くねえ, Itakunee); 071. "Basketball"
Mitsui's gang is defeated just as Akagi arrives at the gym and confronts Mitsui. Kogure then explains that Mitsui was a basketball most valuable player from Takeshi Junior High who joined Shohoku out of his respect and admiration for Anzai. In his first practice match, Mitsui joined Kogure in facing Akagi, who was also a first year student. Although Mitsui was very skilled at making three-point shots, Akagi surpassed him with his defense and slam dunks. However, as the match continued, Mitsui sustained a critical injury to his left knee. Wanting to return to play basketball, he left he hospital early to return to the basketball court but he reinjured the knee more severely. Even after being completely healed, Mitsui decided to quit the team. He became jealous of Miyagi's success and then returned with his gang to provoke a fight with the basketball team to get them kicked out of the Kanagawa Prefecture Interhigh Tournament due to fighting. Mitsui tries to attack Kogure, but is shocked when Anzai appears, and confesses that he wants to play basketball again.
9	A Team of Troubled Teens; Mondaiji Shūdan (問題児集団)	September 4, 1992; 978-4-08-871619-0	April 6, 2010; 978-1-4215-2864-9
072. "Start"; 073. "May 19th" (5月19日, Gogatsu Nijūkunichi); 074. "A Team of Troubled Teens" (問題児集団, Mondaiji Shūdan); 075. "Who Are Those Guys?"; 076. "Free Throw"; 077. "Rookie Sensation"; 078. "Proof of Genius" (天才の証明, Tensai no Shōmei); 079. "Melancholy Genius" (天才の憂鬱, Tensai no Yū'utsu); 080. "Melancholy Genius 2" (天才の憂鬱, Tensai no Yū'utsu Tsū)
When other teachers from Shohoku enter the gym, Sakuragi's gang and Norio Hotta, one of Mitsui's gang members, jointly claim responsibility for provoking the fight to prevent the team from being suspended. Mitsui stops being a delinquent and rejoins the team. Some days later, the Interhigh Tournament starts and Shohoku faces Miuradai High School. However, Anzai does not allow Sakuragi, Miyagi, Rukawa and Mitsui to start as punishment for fighting. With Shohoku down by ten points, he allows them to play on the condition that they will never fight again. Their presence, along with Akagi, allows Shohoku to catch up, but Sakuragi fails to score on any of his free throws. Rukawa enables Shohoku to take the lead. Although Sakuragi gets fouled out, Shohoku easily wins the game. They win the three following games, but Sakuragi gets fouled out in all of them. Shohoku is then set to play against Shoyo, and Sakuragi becomes determined to avoid fouling out again.
10	Rebound King Sakuragi; Ribaundo Ō Sakuragi (リバウンド王桜木)	December 2, 1992; 978-4-08-871620-6	June 1, 2010; 978-1-4215-2865-6
081. "Powerhouse Opponent" (強豪, Kyōgō); 082. "Tip Off"; 083. "No. 1 Center" (No. 1センター, Nanbā Wan Sentā); 084. "Selfish Play" (個人プレー, Kojin Purē); 085. "Mismatch" (ミスマッチ, Misumatchi); 086. "Shoyo's Bad Call" (翔陽の誤算, Shōyō no Gosan); 087. "End of the First Half" (前半の終わり方, Zenhan no Owarikata); 088. "Rebound King Sakuragi" (リバウンド王桜木, Ribaundo Ō Sakuragi); 089. "Shoyo High School #4" (翔陽#4, Shōyō Nanbā Fō)
As the match between Shohoku and Shoyo is about to start, Mitsui decides to prove to Shoyo player Kazushi Hasegawa that he is still as good as he was in junior high school. Anzai chooses Sakuragi as a starter along with Akagi, Mitsui, Rukawa and Miyagi. Shoyo uses all its famous players, with exception of Kenji Fujima who acts as a coach instead. The skill from Toru Hanagata, one of Shoyo's top players, causes Shoyo to go up by eleven points. However, Rukawa and Miyagi manage to make several points to help close the gap. As Mitsui makes a three-pointer, Shoyo makes a comeback to avoid Fujima entering the game. However, Sakuragi manages to rebound most of their shots, allowing Shohoku to keep scoring until they are up. Fujima then enters the game, and most teams from the tournament appear to see him playing.
11	Even a Fluke; Magure da Toshitemo (マグレだとしても)	February 4, 1993; 978-4-08-871621-3	August 3, 2010; 978-1-4215-2866-3
090. "Shoyo and Fujima" (藤真のいる翔陽, Fujima no Iru Shōyō); 091. "60 Seconds"; 092. "For the Win" (勝ちにいく, Kachi ni Iku); 093. "Mitsui's Limit" (三井限界説, Mitsui Genkaisetsu); 094. "Big Idiot" (大バカヤロウ, Dai-Bakayarō); 095. "Four Fouls" (4ファウル, Fō Fauru); 096. "Rookies"; 097. "Even a Fluke" (マグレだとしても, Magure da Toshitemo); 098. "Today's Hot Celeb" (今日の有名人, Kyō no Yūmeijin)
With Fujima entering the game in the second half, Shoyo is able to make a comeback and Shohoku starts losing by twelve points. Sakuragi continues to commit fouls, causing him to be very nervous when committing his fourth. In the latter half, Mitsui becomes exhausted due to his long break from playing basketball. While facing Hasegawa, Mitsui recovers his spirit from junior high school, and starts scoring various three-pointers. Mitsui makes five consecutive three-pointers and Rukawa scores two two pointers, allowing Shohoku to take the lead at 62 to 60. As Mitsui is unable to continue, he is substituted by Kogure. When Rukawa questions Sakuragi's attitude with the four fouls, Sakuragi makes a slam dunk which leaves the audience amazed. However, the slam dunk is considered a foul and Sakuragi is disqualified once again. For the rest of the game Shohoku excels at defense, and they win to move on to the semifinals.
12	Challenging a King; Ōja e no Chōsen (王者への挑戦)	April 2, 1993; 978-4-08-871622-0	October 5, 2010; 978-1-4215-2867-0
099. "Challenging a King" (王者への挑戦, Ōja e no Chōsen); 100. "Central Pillars" (大黒柱, Daikokubashira); 101. "Pumped Up" (気合入りまくり, Kiai-iri Makuri); 102. "Run & Gun" (ラン&ガン, Ran ando Gan); 103. "Rival Warlords" (群雄割拠, Gun'yūkakkyo); 104. "The Unexpected" (計算外プレイヤー, Keisan-gai Pureiyā); 105. "The Genius and the Scrub" (天才と雑魚, Tensai to Zako); 106. "Sakuragi Exposed" (裸の桜木, Hadaka no Sakuragi); 107. "Conservation" (温存, Onzon)
The four best high schools from the Kanagawa Interhigh Tournament are Shohoku, Ryonan, Kainan and Takezato. For the first match Shohoku faces Kainan, which has won the Kanagawa Interhigh Tournament for 16 years. Before starting, Sakuragi rapidly becomes Nobunaga Kiyota's rival with both being very immature and both wanting to surpass Rukawa. Kainan is able to take the lead as the captain Shinichi Maki blocks most shots. As Sakuragi scores while confronting Kiyota, Kainan's coach, Riki Takato, replaces one of his players with Yoshinori Miyamasu, a player who looks very small in comparison to most members from Kainan. When Yoshinori blocks Sakuragi, Sakuragi starts making several mistakes as he only plays well when he faces strong opponents. Sakuragi tries to make a slam dunk, but Maki fouls him and he misses both free throws. As such, Anzai replaces Sakuragi with Kogure near the end of the first half.
13	Unstoppable	June 4, 1993; 978-4-08-871623-7	December 7, 2010; 978-1-4215-2868-7
108. "Super Powerful Rebound Machine" (超強力リバウンドマシーン, Chōkyō Ribaundo Mashīn); 109. "Accident"; 110. "Gori's Shoes" (ゴリの穴, Gori no Ana); 111. "King Kong's Little Brother" (キングコング・弟, Kingu Kongu Otōto); 112. "Selfish"; 113. "Unstoppable"; 114. "Rule the Game"; 115. "Shohoku's Ace" (湘北のエース, Shōhoku no Ēsu); 116. "Gori is Back" (ゴリ Is Back, Gori izu Bakku)
With Shohoku losing by fifteen points, Rukawa and Akagi try to make a comeback, but the latter injures his left foot and has to be replaced by Sakuragi. Anzai then forces Sakuragi and Rukawa to guard the board together. Sakuragi tries valiantly to fill in for Akagi, and he and Rukawa manage to score various times, reducing their disadvantage to less than ten points. Rukawa then keeps scoring by himself. At the end of the first half Rukawa scores once again, evening up the game. In the second half Soichiro Jin from Kainan enters the game, while Akagi replaces Kogure and easily scores.
14	The Best	August 4, 1993; 978-4-08-871624-4	February 1, 2011; 978-1-4215-3321-6
117. "A Year or Two Later" (1年か2年後, Ichinen kara Ninen go); 118. "Two Giants" (両雄, Ryōyū); 119. "The Best"; 120. "Silk"; 121. "Anzai's Strategy" (安西作戦, Anzai Sakusen); 122. "An Energetic Man" (元気な男, Genki na Otoko); 123. "Humiliation" (屈辱, Kutsujoku); 124. "I Play to Win"; 125. "Team Tenacious" (しぶとい奴ら, Shibotoi Yatsura)
Although Shohoku takes the lead with Akagi's moves, Maki leads a comeback, easily passing Shohoku's defense, while Jin starts making three-pointers. Anzai then calls for a time out and reorders the players' position to counterattack Maki's offense. As the counterattacks becomes successful, Sakuragi tries to make a slam dunk but is fouled once again by Maki. However, this time Sakuragi makes the foul shots and Shohoku is down by only six points. As Miyagi also scores, Maki once again expands Kainan's advantage after surpassing Shohoku's defense. By the time there are only two minutes left, Shohoku reduces the difference to four.
15	Heaven & Hell; Tengoku to Jigoku (天国と地獄)	October 4, 1993; 978-4-08-871625-1	April 5, 2011; 978-1-4215-3322-3
126. "Pushed to the Limit" (体力の限界, Tairyoku no Genkai); 127. "Beat Maki" (打倒・牧, Datō Maki); 128. "In Genius's Name" (天才の名にかけて, Tensai no Na ni Kakete); 129. "In Genius's Name 2" (天才の名にかけて2, Tensai no Na ni Kakete Tsū); 130. "Heaven & Hell" (天国と地獄, Tengoku to Jigoku); 131. "Heaven & Hell 2" (天国と地獄, Tengoku to Jigoku Tsū); 132. "On the Brink" (がけっぷち, Gakeppuchi); 133. "A Question of Responsibility" (責任問題, Sekinin Mondai); 134. "Buzzcut's Revenge" (ボーズ頭の逆襲, Bōzu-atama no Gyakushū)
When Maki once again expands Kainan's advantage over Shohoku, Sakuragi and a tired Rukawa reduce the difference to four. Rukawa is then replaced by Kogure, and Shohoku has problems surpassing Kainan's defense. With help from Miyagi and Mitsui, Sakuragi makes a slam dunk, and is also allowed to make a foul shot. As Sakuragi fails the foul shot, every member from Shohoku tries to score, but the time runs out. Kainan defeats Shohoku with a final score of 90 to 88. The next day, although all the players from Shohoku are determined to win the remaining matches, Sakuragi thinks he was responsible for their loss even after Haruko tries to cheer him up. While resting in the gym, Rukawa tells Sakuragi that no matter what he did, Shohoku would have lost. This remark incites a fight, and Sakuragi shows up next with his hair cut to show that they will never lose again. Anzai arranges a practice match between all the students from Shohoku, except Akagi, who is still wounded.
16	Survival Game; Sabaibaru Gēmu (サバイバルゲーム)	December 4, 1993; 978-4-08-871626-8	June 7, 2011; 978-1-4215-3323-0
135. "Center Mitsui" (センター三井, Sentā Mitsui); 136. "Take the Shot" (シュートをねらえ, Shūto o Nera e); 137. "3 Days"; 138. "Survival Game" (サバイバル・ゲーム, Sabaibaru Gēmu); 139. "Ryonan's Challenge" (陵南の挑戦, Ryōnan no Chōsen); 140. "An Unorthodox Strategy" (奇策, Kisaku); 141. "Point Guard"; 142. "Fukuda's Secret" (フクちゃんの秘密, Fuku-chan no Himitsu); 143. "Kainan Wave" (海南 Wave, Kainan Weibu)
Anzai makes Mitsui enter the practice match to confront Sakuragi and make him realize his weakness. After the match, Akagi starts teaching Sakuragi how to shoot inside the key in order to prepare him for the games against Takezato and Ryonan. Shohoku easily wins their match against Takezato, although Sakuragi and Akagi do not play. Then the match between Ryonan and Kainan starts, with Kicchou Fukuda playing for the first time in the tournament with Ryonan. In the first minutes, Sendoh assists Fukuda and Uozumi in making several points, allowing Ryonan to take the lead. However, during the second half Maki and Jin manage to reduce Ryonan's advantage to less than ten points.
17	The Last Spot; Saigo no Isu (最後の椅子)	February 4, 1994; 978-4-08-871627-5	August 2, 2011; 978-1-4215-3324-7
144. "Road to the Nationals" (全国への道, Zenkoku e no Michi); 145. "Superstar Matchup" (スーパースター対決, Sūpāsutā Taiketsu); 146. "One Last Push" (もうひとがんばり, Mō hito Ganbari); 147. "Sendoh's Scenario" (仙道のシナリオ, Sendō no Shinario); 148. "The Old Man" (オヤジ, Oyaji); 149. "The Last Spot" (最後の椅子, Saigo no Isu); 150. "Shohoku vs. Ryonan" (湘北と陵南, Shōhoku to Ryōnan); 151. "Above the Rim"; 152. "Isolation" (アイソレーション, Aisorēshon)
Uozumi commits four fouls, and while discussing it with the official he is ejected. As Maki overpowers Sendoh's defence, Kainan surpasses Ryonan. Before the match ends, Sendoh scores, extending the game. However, Kainan ultimately defeats Ryonan, allowing them to enter the nationals. Meanwhile, Akagi receives a phone call informing him that Anzai is in the hospital, having fallen unconscious while Sakuragi was practising. As they are told Anzai is not in any great danger, Shohoku prepares for their match against Ryonan to decide if they can go to nationals. The match between Shohoku and Ryonan starts, and Sakuragi and Akagi return as starters. Despite making his typical mistakes, Sakuragi manages to help Shohoku take the lead with his practised shots.
18	The Feeling of Falling; Otoshiana no Yokan (落とし穴の予感)	April 4, 1994; 978-4-08-871628-2	October 4, 2011; 978-1-4215-3325-4
153. "Drive By" (抜けそう, Nuke-sō); 154. "A Change in Gori" (ゴリ異変, Gori Ihen); 155. "Boss Monkey Roars" (ボス猿咆哮, Bosu Saru Hōkō); 156. "Two Crazy Guys" (メチャクチャな2人, Mechakucha na Futari); 157. "Humiliation 2" (屈辱2, Kutsujoku Tsū); 158. "The Feeling of Falling" (落とし穴の予感, Otoshiana no Yokan); 159. "Praise Me" (ホメてくれ, Hometekure); 160. "Experience" (経験, Keiken); 161. "Defeat" (敗北, Haiboku)
Shohoku widens their lead, but Fukuda and Uozumi start scoring, with the former confronting and defeating Sakuragi several times. Additionally, Akagi becomes very nervous about the development of the match and makes various mistakes. As Sakuragi head-butts him, Akagi recovers by head-butting back. Both Sakuragi and Akagi try to make slam dunks, but they fail, with Sakuragi's gang trying to restrain him when he loses his control. When Sakuragi calms down, Shohoku starts attacking, managing to get an advantage of over ten points. Fukuda then starts playing as Ryonan's attack focus, easily taking back the advantage for his team by making it past Sakuragi's defense. While trying to stop one of Fukuda's attacks, Sakuragi is injured, as his forehead starts bleeding. Sakuragi is replaced by Kogure, but Mitsui manages to reduce their disadvantage.
19	Ace; Ēsu (エース)	July 4, 1994; 978-4-08-871629-9	December 6, 2011; 978-1-4215-3326-1
162. "Second Half"; 163. "Silent First Half" (沈黙の前半, Chinmoku no Zenhan); 164. "Ace" (エース, Ēsu); 165. "Perseverance" (我慢, Gaman); 166. "The Persistent Man" (こりない男, Korinai Otoko); 167. "Fine Play" (ファインプレイ, Fain Purei); 168. "Taoka's Dream" (田岡の夢, Taoka no Yume); 169. "Rebound King – Sakuragi's Struggles" (リバウンド王・桜木奮闘, Ribaundo Ō Sakuragi Funtō); 170. "The Roar of Victory" (勝利の雄叫び, Shōri no Otakebi)
As the second half starts, Rukawa decides that he will defeat Sendoh and expand his score. Meanwhile, Ryonan plans to block all of Mitsui's shots as he is very skilled at three-pointers. Rukawa succeeds in making Shohoku take the lead, but Sendoh easily makes a comeback. Both teams continue taking advantage over each other, but Uozumi once again commits four fouls, causing him to be subbed. With Uozumi subbed, Shohoku makes a comeback with shots from most of its starters. However, Sakuragi once again makes his typical mistakes, including allowing two points for Ryonana as a result of his poor defense. Akagi manages to expand Shohoku's advantage and Sakuragi successfully rebounds most of Fukuda's attacks. As there are eight minutes left, Shohoku expands its lead to almost ten points.
20	Shohoku's Collapse; Shōhoku Hōkai (湘北崩壊)	September 2, 1994; 978-4-08-871630-5	February 7, 2012; 978-1-4215-3327-8
171. "You Boys Are Good" (君たちは強い, Kimi-tachi wa Tsuyoi); 172. "The Boss is Back" (ボス Is Back, Bosu Izu Bakku); 173. "Concentration" (集中力, Shūchūryoku); 174. "Blue Color"; 175. "Star" (主役, Shuyaku); 176. "Cause for Concern" (不安要素, Fuan Yōso); 177. "Scorer" (点取り屋, Tentori-ya); 178. "Sendoh on Fire" (仙道 ON FIRE, Sendō on Faia); 179. "Shohoku's Collapse" (湘北崩壊, Shōhoku Hōkai)
With Miyagi scoring, Shohoku continues to lead by almost fifteen points. As such, Taoka is forced to make Uozumi return to the game. Uozumi manages to reduce Ryonan's disadvantage with help from Sendoh, and continues rebounding most of Shohoku's missed shots. The high performances from Uozumi and Sendoh allow them to reduce Shohoku's lead to only ten points. Sendoh continues to contain both Rukawa and Sakuragi, and Miyagi has problems defending and commits fouls. Rukawa and Sendoh continue scoring making, alternately expanding and reducing Shohoku's advantage. However, with only two minutes left, Sendoh reduces the gap to only two points and Mitsui suddenly falls unconscious.
21	Win/Loss; Shōhai (勝敗)	November 4, 1994; 978-4-08-871841-5	April 3, 2012; 978-1-4215-3328-5
180. "Mitsui Remorseful" (三井悔恨, Mitsui Kaikon); 181. "Newbie Sakuragi" (素人・桜木, Shirōto Sakuragi); 182. "Newbie Sakuragi 2" (素人・桜木2, Shirōto Sakuragi Tsū); 183. "Four Eyes" (メガネ君, Megane-kun); 184. "Win/Loss" (勝敗, Shōhai); 185. "The Nationals" (インターハイ, Intāhai); 186. "Star of Aichi" (愛知の星, Aichi no Hoshi); 187. "Freshman Punk" (1年坊主, Ichinen Bōzu); 188. "Hikoichi Returns to Osaka" (彦一、大阪へ帰る, Hikoichi, Ōsaka ni Kaeru)
Exhausted by the physical exertion of the game after a long break from basketball, Mitsui is unable to continue playing, and is replaced by Kogure. Meanwhile, Ryonan reduces the lead to only one point, but cannot score due to blocks made by Sakuragi and Akagi. When there is only one minute left Kogure scores, expanding the difference to four points. In the last 58 seconds, Sendoh reduces the lead to two points, but Sakuragi makes slam dunk at the last moment. Shohoku wins 70 to 66, allowing them to enter the nationals along with Kainan. One week after the tournament, Sakuragi meets Maki and Kiyota and all go to watch the last game from Aichi's High School Tournament to see what teams will go to the nationals. They admiringly watch the game between Meihou and Aiwa, which is won by the former. Meanwhile, Rukawa tells Anzai that he wants to go play basketball in America, but Anzai shoots the idea down.
22	The First Round	December 26, 1994; 978-4-08-871842-2	June 5, 2012; 978-1-4215-3329-2
189. "The Land of Basketball" (バスケットの国, Basuketto no Kuni); 190. "The Best Japanese High School Player" (日本一の高校生, Nippon Ichi no Kōkōsei); 191. "One-on-One"; 192. "The First Round"; 193. "Nationals in Jeopardy" (全国が危ない, Zenkoku ga Abunai); 194. "Training Camp" (合宿, Gasshuku); 195. "Training Camp 2" (合宿2, Gasshuku Tsū); 196. "Training Camp 3" (合宿3, Gasshuku Surī); 197. "Brand-New Shoes " (バッシュ (brand-new), Basshu (Burando-Nyū))
Anzai's wife tells Rukawa that once one of Anzai's players went to America, but fell under a big depression until dying due to various conflicts with his teammates and rivals. However, Rukawa becomes determined to become the best player from Japan, and plays a one-on-one match against Mitsui. Sakuragi interrupts him and claims they never had a one-on-one, as Rukawa is afraid of losing to him. As such both compete in private, and Rukawa manages to defeat Sakuragi. Due to the poor grades from Sakuragi, Rukawa, Mitsui and Miyagi, Akagi is forced to assist them in their academics, so that they may still be allowed to compete at nationals. A few days later, Shohoku starts its one-week training, but Anzai doesn't let Sakuragi go. Anzai makes Sakuragi practise his jump shots by making twenty thousand shots in a week. With help from his gang and Haruko, Sakuragi is successful in his training. The following week, the Shohoku team boards a train on their way to the national tournament.
23	A Rank Toyotoma – C Rank Shohoku; Ē Ranku to Shī Ranku (AランクとCランク)	March 3, 1995; 978-4-08-871843-9	August 7, 2012; 978-1-4215-3330-8
198. "Shinkansen" (新幹線); 199. "The Eve of the First Game" (緒戦前夜, Shosen Zen'ya); 200. "A Rank Toyotoma – C Rank Shohoku" (Aランク豊玉・Cランク湘北, Ē Ranku Toyotama - Shī Ranku Shōhoku); 201. "A Rank vs. C Rank" (AランクとCランク, Ē Ranku to Shī Ranku); 202. "Angry Phenom" (怒れる天才, Okoreru Tensai); 203. "Gori on a Roll" (ゴリ絶好調, Gori Zekkōchō); 204. "Jump Shot" (ジャンプシュート, Janpu Shūto); 205. "The Alleged Ace Killer" (疑惑のエースキラー, Giwaku no Ēsu Kirā); 206. "We Are Beginners" (オレたちは甘い, Ore-tachi wa Amai)
On the train to the national tournament, the Shohoku members get into an argument with players from the Toyotama High School, who reveal that Shohoku is a C-ranked team in the tournament while Toyotama is A ranked. As they arrive at Hiroshima, Shohoku receives support from Hikoichi who tells them about the players from Toyotama whom they will face in the first round. The game between Toyotama and Shohoku starts, and Miyagi has problems with Toyotama's attacks as most of the players tend to bother him. Sakuragi continues making his typical mistakes to the point that he is subbed by the first year Yasuharu Yasuda as Anzai wants to slow down the pace of the game. Akagi and Rukawa manage to tie the game, but the Toyotama captain Tsuyoshi Minami elbows Rukawa's left eye on purpose. Rukawa is then subbed by Sakuragi and the game continues. Toyotama keeps committing fouls, but they manage to gain and hold the lead till the end of the first half. While preparing for the second half, Rukawa decides to continue playing despite his injury.
24	For Victory; Shōri no Tame ni (勝利のために)	June 2, 1995; 978-4-08-871844-6	October 2, 2012; 978-1-4215-3331-5
207. "Head-to-Head Battle" (真っ向勝負, Makkō Shōbu); 208. "Proof of an Ace" (エースの証明, Ēsu no Shōmei); 209. "Training Camp Shot" (合宿シュート, Gasshuku Shūto); 210. "Shohoku's Pursuit" (湘北追撃, Shōhoku Tsuigeki); 211. "Internal Collapse" (内部崩壊, Naibu Hōkai); 212. "For Victory" (勝利のために, Shōri no Tame ni); 213. "The End of the Ace Killer" (エースキラーの最期, Ēsu Kirā no Saigo); 214. "Tenacity for Victory" (勝利への執念, Shōri e no Shūnen); 215. "Yamaoh" (ヤマオー, Yamaō)
The second half starts and Rukawa returns, replacing Yasuda. Miyagi no longer pays attention to the insults hurled at him by Toyotama's players, and he puts together some effective offense. Shohoku reduces their disadvantage until they finally tie the game at 81 points each. During a timeout Minori Kishimoto from Toyotama has an argument with Minami, but when Minori insults Kanehira the coach, he ends up being punched by him. Kanehira allows Minori to keep playing, but criticizes his arrogance and violence. As the game continues, Rukawa starts scoring, and Shohoku takes the lead. Minami tries to hit Rukawa once again to score, but as he notes Rukawa is not afraid, he stops his attack. However, he is injured while falling to the floor and is subbed. With Sakuragi once again scoring, Shohoku goes up by ten points with only two minutes left in the game. Minami returns to the game, and all the players from Toyotama decide to play without committing fouls. Toyotama tries to catch up, but Shohoku manages to defend the net until the game ends. After Shohoku wins, Akagi receives a call from Superintendent Karasawa who congrantulates Shohoku, but warns them that in the next round they will face Sannoh, which is considered the strongest high school basketball team in Japan.
25	Greatest Challenge; Saidai no Chōsen (最大の挑戦)	September 4, 1995; 978-4-08-871845-3	December 4, 2012; 978-1-4215-3332-2
216. "Champions" (王者, Ōja); 217. "Dawn of the Phenom" (夜明けの天才, Yoake no Tensai); 218. "Shohoku Dissected" (湘北徹底解剖, Shōhoku Tettei Kaibō); 219. "Powerhouse Entrance" (強豪登場, Kyōgō Tōjō); 220. "Pre-Game" (戦う前, Tatakau Mae); 221. "Can't Wait to See Sannoh" (早く見たいな山王工業, Hayaku Mitai San'nō Kōgyō); 222. "Greatest Challenge" (最大の挑戦, Saidai no Chōsen); 223. "Surprise Attack" ("奇襲", Kishū); 224. "Phenom?" (天才?, Tensai?)
The team members from Shohoku watch a video tape of the final game from the nationals from last year, and end surprised with how Sannoh easily defeated Kainan. Rukawa is then visited by Minami who apologizes for hitting him in the previous game. The players from Sannoh also watch a video tape showing Shohoku's games, but the ace Eiji Sawakita easily analyzes their skills. As the day of the match arrives, both teams practice in front of the audience. A few players from Shohoku start feeling nervous to the point that Sakuragi fails to make a slam dunk, falling to the floor instead. After the practice ends, Anzai goes to talk with each starter and easily calms them. The match finally begins, and Miyagi and Sakuragi start by making an ambush. Off an alley-oop from Miyagi, Sakuragi makes the first two points. Shohoku continues to score, but Sannoh responds to each bucket.
26	Power Match; Pawā Shōbu (パワー勝負)	December 1, 1995; 978-4-08-871846-0	February 5, 2013; 978-1-4215-3333-9
225. "Shooter" (シューター, Shūtā); 226. "Too Good to Be True" (出来すぎ, Dekisugi); 227. "Exactly as Planned" (狙い通り, Neraidōri); 228. "Pride" (プライド, Puraido); 229. "Big Man" (ビッグマン, Biggu Man); 230. "Local War" (局地戦, Kyokuchisen); 231. "Power Match" (パワー勝負, Pawā Shōbu); 232. "Sayonara, Chunky" (サヨナラ丸男, Sayonara Maruo); 233. "Turbulent Second Half" (怒涛の後半, Dōtō no Kōhan)
Mitsui makes three three-pointers in a row, and Akagi scores, causing Shohoku to take the lead. Although Satoshi Ichinokura from Sannoh blocks Mitsui's attacks, as Miyagi is blocked, Sakuragi accidentally scores with his face. As Sakuragi is temporarily subbed to stop his bleeding, Rukawa faces Sawakita who is considered the best player from Japan. Sakuragi returns to the game, and Shohoku continues winning. Rukawa and Sawakita are then subbed with Kogure and Mikio Kawata, respectively. Sakuragi faces Mikio, who easily blocks him due to his height. In a timeout, Anzai makes Sakuragi the focal point of Shohoku's offense, but Shohoku is unable to stop Masashi Kawata from scoring, putting Sannoh down by only one point. Sakuragi once again confronts Mikio, and is able to score after passing him. The first half ends with Shohoku winning 36 to 34. Sawakita and Rukawa return for the second half, and the former makes a three-pointer, causing Sannoh to take the lead.
27	Shohoku in Trouble; Shōhoku in Toraburu (湘北 in Trouble)	February 2, 1996; 978-4-08-871847-7	April 2, 2013; 978-1-4215-3334-6
234. "Shohoku in Trouble" (湘北 in Trouble, Shōhoku in Toraburu); 235. "Zone Press" (ゾーンプレス, Zōn Puresu); 236. "Speedster" (スピードスター, Supīdosutā); 237. "The Man"; 238. "In the Middle"; 239. "Big and Good" (大っきくてウマい, Daikkikute Uma i); 240. "Uncool Shohoku" (かっこ悪い湘北, Kakko Warui Shōhoku); 241. "Four Points"; 242. "The Trump Card Arrives" (切り札参上, Kirifuda Sanjō)
In two and a half minutes, Sannoh presses Shohoku's defense, most notably Mitsui and Miyagi, and extends the lead over Shohoku to 14. In a timeout, Anzai makes Miyagi the only inbounder from Shohoku, to counterattack Sannoh. Although Miyagi successfully passes the ball, Rukawa and Sakuragi are unable to score due to Masashi's blocks. Then Masashi easily slam dunks after passing both Akagi and Sakuragi. Sannoh starts winning by almost twenty points, and Akagi continues to be unsuccessful in blocking Masashi. With such a big difference, most people from the audience leave, thinking that Sannoh has already won. After Shohoku's last timeout Anzai replaces Sakuragi with Kogure but only to advise him. Sawakita keeps scoring, putting Sannoh up by 24 points. Anzai tells Sakuragi to get rebounds to help Shohoku get back in the game, and all of the first year players support him. Sakuragi then returns to the game, but he first hits Akagi's butt to relax him. He then jumps to the audience and claims that he will defeat Sannoh.
28	Two Years; Ninenkan (2年間)	April 4, 1996; 978-4-08-871848-4	June 4, 2013; 978-1-4215-3335-3
243. "O.R."; 244. "Heart of Team"; 245. "Out of the Dark" (闇の外へ, Yami no Soto e); 246. "The Captain's Determination" (主将の決意, Shushō no Ketsui); 247. "No Surrender" (譲れない, Yuzurenai); 248. "Two Years" (2年間, Ninenkan); 249. "Faith" (信頼, Shinrai); 250. "Rhythm" (リズム, Rizumu); 251. "Get Carried Away" (図にのれ, Zu ni Nore)
With help from Miyagi, Sakuragi scores twice after beating Masahiro Nobe, reducing the lead to twenty points. Akagi still remains pressed when confronting Masashi, and misses a good chance to score. Then Uozumi appears in front of Akagi, telling him to stop being afraid of being defeated by Masashi. Akagi then recovers and continues playing his powerful defense. Also inspired by Uozumi, Mitsui starts making various three-pointers. Even though he becomes very exhausted once again, Mitsui continues playing and Sakuragi helps him to score. Akagi and Miyagi keep scoring, reducing the lead to ten points. Masashi returns to block Sakuragi, but Sakuragi in turn manages to stop his shot.
29	Talent; Itsuzai (逸材)	June 4, 1996; 978-4-08-871849-1	August 6, 2013; 978-1-4215-3336-0
252. "Talent" (逸材, Itsuzai); 253. "Ace Sawakita Strikes Back" (エース沢北の逆襲, Ēsu Sawakita no Gyakushū); 254. "Super Ace" (スーパーエース, Sūpā Ēsu); 255. "Sawakita" (沢北); 256. "Challenge" (チャレンジ, Charenji); 257. "Challenge 2" (チャレンジ, Charenji Tsū); 258. "Groundwork" (布石, Fuseki); 259. "Groundwork 2" (布石2, Fuseki Tsū); 260. "Debts Must Be Repaid Immediately" (借りは即返さなければならない, Kari wa Soku Kaesanakereba Naranai)
Rukawa slam dunks, reducing the difference to only eight points. Sawakita confronts Rukawa and has no problems in scoring after passing him. Rukawa cannot beat Sawakita, who is able to block most of his shots and scores once again. Sannoh expands their advantage to 16, as none of the players from Shohoku can block Sawakita. A frustrated Rukawa then remembers that when he trained with Sendoh, he told him that there is a player stronger than him called "Kitasawa". Rukawa realizes he made a mistake and that he meant Sawakita. Sawakita expands Sannoh's advantage to almost twenty points once again, but Rukawa becomes determined to defeat him. Instead of shooting, Rukawa realizes that the easiest way to score is by passing the ball, which he is successful at, allowing Akagi to score twice. As Rukawa decides to attack, some miscommunication with Sakuragi sends both of them to the floor. Now extremely frustrated, Sakuragi decides to block Sawakita.
30	Career; Senshu Shimei (選手生命)	August 2, 1996; 978-4-08-871850-7	October 1, 2013; 978-1-4215-3337-7
261. "Swish"; 262. "One-on-Two" (1対2, Wan tai Tsū); 263. "Take a Point" (一理ある, Ichiriaru); 264. "The Savior" (救世主, Kyūseishu); 265. "Order" (指図, Sashizu); 266. "Starting Point" (原点, Genten); 267. "Career" (選手生命, Senshu Shimei); 268. "Ultimate – Sannoh's Stamina" (最強・山王の体力, Saikyō San'nō no Tairyoku); 269. "Phenom's Misfortune" (天才薄命, Tensai Hakumei)
Sakuragi succeeds in blocking Sawakita, and Rukawa helps Akagi and Mitsui to score several times. Shohoku keeps attacking and Rukawa reduces their disadvantage to eight. With barely two minutes left in the game, Sakuragi tries to attack but instead missteps and runs into a table on the sidelines. Due to the hit, the officials call timeout, but Sakuragi continues playing. Just as Sakuragi tries to block a basketball, his spine starts to hurt. Rukawa makes a three-pointer, putting Shohoku down by only five points. As Sannoh calls for a timeout, Ayako realizes Sakuragi's pain and tells him that if he keeps playing against Sannoh, he will never be able to play again. However, Sakuragi decides he will keep going and Shohoku looks to take the lead in the last two minutes. However, Masashi scores first, expanding the difference. Akagi tries to score, but he is fouled by Masashi, and Sakuragi slam dunks. The slam dunk does not count due to Masashi's foul, and Sakuragi suddenly falls unconscious from the pain in his spine. As he is subbed by Kogure, Sakuragi realizes he wants to keep playing, and when he awakes he confesses to Haruko his love for basketball.
31	Shohoku High School Basketball Team; Shōhoku Kōkō Basukettobōru-bu (湘北高校バスケットボール部)	October 3, 1996; 978-4-08-871839-2	December 3, 2013; 978-1-4215-3338-4
270. "Days of Glory" (栄光の時, Eikō no Toki); 271. "Resolute Shohoku" (ダンコ湘北, Danko Shōhoku); 272. "Desperate Defense" (死守, Shishu); 273. "Desperate Effort" (死力, Shiryoku); 274. "5 vs. 4" (5対4, Faibu tai Fō); 275. "And 1"; 276. "Shohoku High School Basketball Team" (湘北高校バスケットボール部, Shōhoku Kōkō Basukettobōru-bu)
As Akagi scores the foul shots, Sakuragi requests to keep playing. When the game continues, Sakuragi blocks Masashi's shot, and Rukawa and Miyagi help Mitsui to reduce Sannoh's lead to only one point. Sakuragi and Akagi keep blocking Sannoh's attacks, and then Sakuragi helps Rukawa to score. Shohoku takes the lead by one point with only 23 seconds left in the game. In the next 10 seconds, Sawakita manages to score, allowing Sannoh to take the lead. With only 8 seconds to the end of the game, all of the Shohoku players ferociously attack until Rukawa passes the ball to Sakuragi, who scores on a buzzer-beating jump shot. The match ends with Shohoku winning 79 to 78, allowing them to pass to the third round against Aiwa. However, with the absence of Sakuragi, Shohoku lost terribly against Aiwa and were eliminated. Some time later, Haruko sends Sakuragi a letter, telling him that Kogure and Akagi graduated, and now Miyagi is the new captain. Mitsui stayed in Shohoku, while Haruko became a new manager. As Sakuragi is reading the letter, he finds Rukawa training in the beach as he joined the All Japan training camp. Meanwhile, Sakuragi is still in rehabilitation in order to heal his spine so he can continue playing basketball.
