= "Kodomo o Koroshite Kudasai" to Iu Oya-tachi =

Japanese manga series

- First tankōbon volume cover

「子供を殺してください」という親たち
- Genre: Non-fiction
- Manga
- Written by: Takeshi Oshikawa
- Illustrated by: Masakazu Suzuki
- Published by: Shinchosha
- Imprint: Bunch Comics
- Magazine: Monthly Comic Bunch (2013–2024); Comic Bunch Kai (2024–present)
- Original run: February 21, 2017 – present
- Volumes: 19

"Kodomo o Koroshite Kudasai" to Iu Oya-tachi (「子供を殺してください」という親たち; lit. Parents Who Say, "Please Kill My Children") is a Japanese manga series written by Takeshi Oshikawa and illustrated by Masakazu Suzuki. It began serialization in Shinchosha's Monthly Comic Bunch magazine in February 2017. After the final issue of the magazine was published in March 2024, it was later transferred to the newly-formed Comic Bunch Kai online magazine resuming in April that same year. The series is an adaptation of a novel of the same name by Oshikawa.

== Synopsis ==
The series is centered around the struggles of children dealing with their abusive parents.

== Publication ==
Written by Takeshi Oshikawa and illustrated by Masakazu Suzuki, "Kodomo o Koroshite Kudasai" to Iu Oya-tachi began serialization in Shinchosha's Monthly Comic Bunch magazine on February 21, 2017. After the final issue of the magazine was published on March 21, 2024, the series was transferred to the newly established Comic Bunch Kai online magazine resuming on April 26 that same year. Its chapters have been collected into nineteen tankōbon volumes as of July 2026.

No.	Release date	ISBN
1	August 9, 2017	978-4-10-771997-3
2	January 9, 2018	978-4-10-772038-2
3	June 9, 2018	978-4-10-772088-7
4	December 7, 2018	978-4-10-772140-2
5	June 8, 2019	978-4-10-772186-0
6	December 9, 2019	978-4-10-772241-6
7	July 9, 2020	978-4-10-772300-0
8	December 9, 2020	978-4-10-772348-2
9	June 9, 2021	978-4-10-772398-7
10	November 9, 2021	978-4-10-772444-1
11	May 9, 2022	978-4-10-772497-7
12	November 9, 2022	978-4-10-772543-1
13	May 9, 2023	978-4-10-772599-8
14	November 9, 2023	978-4-10-772665-0
15	May 9, 2024	978-4-10-772715-2
16	November 9, 2024	978-4-10-772765-7
17	May 9, 2025	978-4-10-772831-9
18	January 8, 2026	978-4-10-772904-0
19	July 9, 2026	978-4-10-772963-7

== Reception ==
By November 2023, the series had over 1.6 million copies in circulation.
