= Raijin Comics =

Discontinued North American manga magazine

Raijin Comics #1

Raijin Comics is a discontinued manga anthology published from 2002 until 2004 in North America by the now-defunct Gutsoon! Entertainment and largely backed by Sega at its inception. The collected volumes of Raijin Comics titles were published under the Raijin Graphic Novels imprint. The magazine was aimed at mature readers.

Premiering with a cover date of December 18, 2002, Raijin was initially published on a weekly basis similar to various popular manga magazines in Japan, including Coamix's own Weekly Comic Bunch. However, distribution problems made the weekly schedule difficult to maintain and the weekly format ceased with issue #36 (September 10, 2003), becoming a monthly publication from issue #37 (October 2003) until issue #46 (July 2004), when the magazine ceased publication. Its failure to break into the U.S. market has been attributed to competition with the North American version of Shonen Jump, which debuted shortly afterward, despite the fact that they were aimed at different age range. Also, unlike Jump, many of the titles in Raijin lacked general brand awareness amongst casual American manga fans.

On May 5, 2005, Raijin lost control of the raijincomics.com domain name to domain squatters. The corporate website, gutsoon.com remained in operation for many years but wasn't updated after June 2004, and as of mid-2010, has been taken over by domain squatters. Since the folding of Raijin Comics, some of its titles (Slam Dunk, Guardian Angel Getten and Fist of the North Star) have since been licensed to other companies.

== Series published by Raijin ==
The following series were serialized in Raijin Comics, with the issues they appeared in parentheses:

- Baki the Grappler (2-46)
- Bomber Girl (1-11)
- Bow Wow Wata (14-21, 23–33, 35–41, 43–46)
- City Hunter (1-46)
- The First President of Japan (2-18, 20–23, 25–29)
- Fist of the Blue Sky (1-31, 34–35, 37–46)
- Guardian Angel Getten (4-7, 9-20, 22–32, 34–46)
- Nemuri Kyoshiro (33-46)
- Hana no Keiji (19-34, 36–45)
- Mountain Climbers Saga (5, 13, 46)
- Revenge of Mouflon (4-18, 30–36, 38–46)
- Slam Dunk (1-14, 16–46)

== Imprinted manga series ==
| Title | Author/Illustrator |
|---|---|
| Fist Of the North Star | Art: Tetsuo Hara, Story: Buronson |
| Twisted Tales | Art and Story: Tsukasa Tsuji |
| Irasshaimase, Japan! | Art and Story: Jun Hanyunyu |

== See also ==
- List of manga magazines published outside of Japan
