= Bomber Girl =

Japanese manga series

- Cover of the original Bomber Girl
- Genre: Action; Comedy; Science fiction
- Manga

Bomber Girl (pilot chapter)
- Written by: Makoto Niwano
- Published by: Shueisha
- Magazine: Weekly Shōnen Jump: Zōkan Spring Special
- Published: 1993
- Manga
- Written by: Makoto Niwano
- Published by: Shueisha
- English publisher: NA: Gutsoon! Entertainment
- Imprint: Jump Comics
- Magazine: Weekly Shōnen Jump
- English magazine: NA: Raijin Comics
- Original run: January 31, 1994 – April 11, 1994
- Volumes: 1
Further information
Manga
Bomber Girl Crash!
Written by	Makoto Niwano
Published by	Shōnen Gahosha
Magazine	Young Comic; Young King
Published	2000
Volumes	3
Manga
Bomber Girl Complete
Written by	Makoto Niwano
Published by	Shōnen Gahosha
Magazine	Young King
Published	2002
Manga
Bomber Girl XXX
Written by	Makoto Niwano
Published by	Shōnen Gahosha
Magazine	Young King
Published	2004
Volumes	3
- icon

Bomber Girl (stylized in all caps) is a Japanese manga series written and illustrated by Makoto Niwano. It was published in Shueisha's Weekly Shōnen Jump from January to April 1994.

In North America, the series was published by Gutsoon Entertainment and serialized in its Raijin Comics manga anthology.

== Plot ==
The series is about Emi Rashomon (羅生門エミー, Rashomon Emii), a bounty hunter who uses her sex appeal to defeat enemies. Guy Kurosaki (黒崎 ガイ, Kurosaki Gai) is a police officer who initially opposes Emi's methods.

== Release ==
Bomber Girl is written and illustrated by Makoto Niwano. It was published in Shueisha's Weekly Shōnen Jump from January 31 to April 11, 1994. The eleven individual chapters were compiled in a single tankōbon volume on August 4, 1994.

In North America, the series was published by Gutsoon Entertainment and serialized in its Raijin Comics manga anthology.

== Reception ==
The series received very negative critics from manga and anime reviewers. John Jakala said that the first instalment of the series was okay, but the second was even more amateur. He referred to a car panel as it looked like something an elementary school child would draw in the margins of his math notebook. He also noted that he does not want to pay for work of such unprofessional quality. He cast his vote against Bomber Girl on an online survey. John Jakala continuously made fun of the series in the later reviews.

Jason Thompson described it as "amoral girl with big boobs killing and torturing people," despising the manga as he stated, "[it] is so awful that I assume it got published because [Makoto] Niwano jumped into an icy river to save [Tetsuo] Hara and [Tsukasa] Hojo from drowning." Eduardo M. Chavez of Mania Entertainment pondered, "For those looking for a manga with a lot of action, a good amount of fan-service, and some crazy looking characters this might be a good call. ... For those looking for something with a decent plot, character designs that won't disturb you, and fan-service that does not involved greased up male cult members or a gang boss that has a gattling gun [sic] on ... his phallus you should pass."
