= Gutsoon! Entertainment =

Defunct American manga publisher

Gutsoon! Entertainment, Inc. was a publisher of English translated manga. The company, headquartered in Encino, Los Angeles, served as the US subsidiary of Coamix, which was founded by Nobuhiko Horie and manga artist Tsukasa Hojo.

The company published the English manga anthology Raijin Comics, a U.S. equivalent to the Japanese Weekly Comic Bunch and published many of the same titles (Fist of the Blue Sky and City Hunter), as well titles from other magazines such as the Japanese Weekly Shōnen Jump.

== History ==
Raijin Comics began as a weekly magazine with its first issue (dated December 18, 2002), but switched to being a monthly publication beginning with its 36th issue (dated September 2003). Gutsoon! also published a companion magazine to Raijin Comics, titled Raijin Game & Anime (originally called Fujin Magazine), which lasted only 20 issues before being merged into the pages of Raijin Comics. The collected volumes of Raijin Comics titles were published under the Raijin Graphic Novels imprint. Raijin Comics also has a mascot called "Raijin Maru". Before the company's fall they were also planning to make a shōjo manga magazine called Smile Magazine.

On March 15, 2004, Gutsoon! announced that they would be placing their Rajin Comics brand on hiatus. Raijin Comics ceased publication with its July 2004 issue (issue #46) and the Raijin Graphic Novels line was subsequently cancelled as well.

== Titles published by Gutsoon! ==
Slam Dunk

- Baki the Grappler - Keisuke Itagaki (Magazine: Weekly Shōnen Champion, Publisher: Akita Shoten, Demographic: Shōnen)
- Bomber Girl - Makoto Niwano (Magazine: Weekly Shōnen Jump, Publisher: Shueisha, Demographic: Shōnen)
- Bow Wow Wata (Magazine: Weekly Comic Bunch, Publisher: Shinchosha-Coamix, Demographic: Seinen)
- City Hunter (Magazine: Weekly Shōnen Jump, Publisher: Shueisha, Demographic: Shōnen)
- Encounter (Magazine: Weekly Comic Bunch, Publisher: Shinchosha-Coamix, Demographic: Seinen)
- The First President of Japan (Magazine: Bart, Publisher: Shueisha, Demographic: Seinen)
- Fist of the Blue Sky (Magazine: Weekly Comic Bunch, Publisher: Shinchosha-Coamix, Demographic: Seinen)
- Fist of the North Star: Master Edition (Full Color) (Currently licensed to VIZ media, LLC) (Magazine: Weekly Shōnen Jump, Publisher: Shueisha, Demographic: Shōnen)
- Guardian Angel Getten (later licensed to Tokyopop) (Magazine: Weekly Shōnen Gangan, Publisher: Enix, Demographic: Shōnen)
- Keiji (originally Hana no Keiji) (Magazine: Weekly Shōnen Jump, Publisher: Shinchosha-Coamix later Shueisha, Demographic: Seinen)
- Nemuri Kyoshiro (Magazine: Weekly Comic Bunch, Publisher: Shinchosha-Coamix, Demographic: Seinen)
- Revenge of Mouflon (Magazine: Weekly Comic Bunch, Publisher: Shinchosha-Coamix, Demographic: Seinen)
- Slam Dunk (currently licensed to VIZ media, LLC) (Magazine: Weekly Shōnen Jump, Publisher: Shueisha, Demographic: Shōnen)
- Wild Leager (Magazine: Weekly Comic Bunch, Publisher: Shinchosha-Coamix Demographic: Seinen)

== RAIJIN Collection ==
Some volumes of Raijin Comics were only published in Japan. These were called Raijin Collection volumes and were in large phone book magazine issues. Another line like Raijin Collection would be Shueisha Jump Remix. The list below has all the manga by the Raijin Collection label:

- Angel Heart
- Fist of the North Star
