= President of Japan =

Japan does not have a president. The ceremonial head of state is the Emperor of Japan and the head of government is the Prime Minister of Japan.

President of Japan may also refer to:

- President of the House of Councillors, one of two heads of the legislative branch of government in Japan
- The President of Japan: Sakurazaka Mantarō, a 16-volume manga series by Yoshiki Hidaka
