= Fist of the Blue Sky =

Japanese manga series and its adaptation(s)

- Cover of volume 22, featuring most of the main characters

蒼天の拳 (Sōten no Ken)
- Manga
- Written by: Tetsuo Hara; Supervision: Buronson
- Illustrated by: Tetsuo Hara
- Published by: Shinchosha
- English publisher: NA: Gutsoon! Entertainment (canceled)
- Magazine: Weekly Comic Bunch
- English magazine: NA: Raijin Comics
- Original run: May 2001 – August 2010
- Volumes: 22
- Anime television series
- Directed by: Yoshihiro Yamaguchi; Supervision: Buronson
- Produced by: Naomi Nishiguchi; Kazuhiko Hidano; Masanobu Watanabe
- Written by: Yasuhiro Imagawa
- Music by: Marco d'Ambrosio
- Studio: A.P.P.P. (Note: Credited as Souten Studio (蒼天スタジオ))
- Original network: TV Asahi
- Original run: October 4, 2006 – March 14, 2007
- Episodes: 26
- Manga

Sōten no Ken: Re:Genesis
- Written by: Hiroyuki Yatsu
- Illustrated by: Hideki Tsuji
- Published by: Coamix
- Magazine: Monthly Comic Zenon
- Original run: October 25, 2017 – September 25, 2025
- Volumes: 6
- Anime television series

Fist of the Blue Sky: Regenesis
- Directed by: Yoshio Kazumi; Supervision: Buronson
- Produced by: Tomonari Katō; Ken Kawakita
- Written by: Satoshi Ozaki
- Music by: Masatoshi Nishimura
- Studio: Polygon Pictures
- Original network: Tokyo MX, Sun TV, KBS Kyoto, BS Fuji
- Original run: April 2, 2018 – December 17, 2018
- Episodes: 24

Fist of the Blue Sky (Japanese: 蒼天の拳, Hepburn: Sōten no Ken) is a Japanese manga series written and illustrated by Tetsuo Hara, with plot supervision by Buronson. It was serialized in Weekly Comic Bunch from 2001 to 2010, with the chapters collected into 22 tankōbon volumes by Shinchosha. It is a prequel to the popular 1980s manga Fist of the North Star, which Hara originally illustrated with Buronson writing. Set primarily in Shanghai during the 1930s, the series centers on the 62nd successor of the Hokuto Shinken martial arts style, Kenshiro Kasumi, the namesake and predecessor of Kenshiro from Fist of the North Star. The manga was adapted into a 26-episode anime series that aired on TV Asahi from October 2006 to March 2007.

A continuation of the manga, Sōten no Ken: Re:Genesis (蒼天の拳 RE:GENESIS), written by Hiroyuki Yatsu and illustrated by Hideki Tsuji with the additional involvement of Hara, was serialized between 2017 and 2025 in Monthly Comic Zenon, with the chapters collected into six volumes by Coamix. A 24-episode anime series of the same name aired from April to December 2018, with oversight by Hara.

== Plot ==
The main protagonist of this story is Kenshiro Kasumi, better known as "Yan Wang" or "The King of Hell". Kenshiro is a laid back and chain-smoking Tokyo professor who is secretly the successor of the deadly Chinese assassin martial art Hokuto Shinken. He travels to Shanghai after hearing that his Triad friend Pan Guang-Lin and love interest Pan Yu-Ling are in trouble.

In Shanghai, Kenshiro fights the three Hokuto families, the Hokuto Sankaken (based on the royal families of Romance of the Three Kingdoms). At the same time he helps Pan's Qīng Bāng triad against their rivals, the immoral Hóng Huá Huì, in gaining territory and influence in Shanghai.

== Production ==
Many of the plot points mentioned in the comic contain real historical facts, such as how Shanghai was controlled by the foreign concessions (the story focus mainly on the French settlement) during the 1930s. Also seen are Jewish refugees who escaped from Nazi persecution in Europe, and the invasion of China by the Japanese Army. Chiang Kai-shek and some historical Kuomintang figures appear in the story as well.

Tetsuo Hara wanted the fights in the manga to look more like traditional Chinese martial arts, so the action is somewhat faster and more detailed than those in Fist of the North Star. Hara went to Shanghai in person to get his inspiration. Tetsuo Hara describes the protagonist Kenshiro Kasumi as a combination of the strength of Kenshiro, the good nature of Keiji Maeda from Hana no Keiji and the sarcastic attitude of the title character of Nakabo Rintaro.

== Media ==
=== Manga ===
Illustrated by Tetsuo Hara with supervision from Buronson, Fist of the Blue Sky was serialized in Weekly Comic Bunch throughout the magazine's entire history. Beginning in its first issue with the cover date of May 29, 2001, the chapters were published irregularly until the final issue in August 2010. Publisher Shinchosha collected the chapters into 22 tankōbon volumes.

An English version of Fist of the Blue Sky was serialized in the now-defunct manga anthology Raijin Comics published by Gutsoon! Entertainment from 2002 to 2004. Four collected volumes were published by Gutsoon under their Raijin Graphic Novels imprint before the company went out of business and ceased publication of all their titles.

A continuation of the manga, Sōten no Ken: Re:Genesis (蒼天の拳 RE:GENESIS), written by Hiroyuki Yatsu and illustrated by Hideki Tsuji, was serialized between December 2017 and November 2025 issues of Coamix's Monthly Comic Zenon and compiled into six volumes. Original manga creators Buronson and Tetsuo Hara supervised the series' art and scripts.

Volumes

Vol.	Release date	ISBN	English release date	English ISBN
01	2001-10-09	4-10-771000-9	2003-06-18	0-9725037-8-1
02	2001-11-09	4-10-771016-5	2003-09-09	1-932454-03-9
03	2002-05-09	4-10-771036-X	2003-11-18	1-932454-09-8
04	2002-08-09	4-10-771051-3	2004-03-17	1-932454-22-5
05	2003-01-09	4-10-771073-4	Unpublished	1-932454-33-0
06	2003-05-09	4-10-771089-0	—	—
07	2003-09-09	4-10-771112-9	—	—
08	2004-01-09	4-10-771129-3	—	—
09	2004-05-09	4-10-771151-X	—	—
10	2004-08-09	4-10-771167-6	—	—
11	2004-12-09	4-10-771189-7	—	—
12	2005-03-09	4-10-771206-0	—	—
13	2005-07-09	4-10-771225-7	—	—
14	2006-01-09	4-10-771258-3	—	—
15	2006-07-09	4-10-771281-8	—	—
16	2007-02-09	4-10-771318-0	—	—
17	2007-09-08	4-10-771356-3	—	—
18	2008-03-08	4-10-771387-3	—	—
19	2008-10-09	4-10-771421-7	—	—
20	2009-03-09	4-10-771467-5	—	—
21	2009-12-09	4-10-771535-3	—	—
22	2010-11-09	4-10-771601-5	—	—

=== Anime ===
A weekly anime series based on Sōten no Ken aired on Japan's TV Asahi on Thursdays at 2:40 am from October 4, 2006, to March 14, 2007. The series lasted only 26 episodes, but four of the episodes (16–18, and 21) did not air during the original run. The complete series has been released on DVD in Region 2 format by Universal Entertainment Japan, including unaired episodes and uncensored content. The series adapts the storyline from the beginning and up to vol. 8. The Opening theme is "Bara ga Saku, Bara ga Chiru" (薔薇が咲く 薔薇が散る; "Roses Bloom, Roses Scatter") by Rina Aiuchi while the ending themes are "Kokoro no Rhythm Tobichiru Butterfly (心のリズム飛び散るバタフライ, Kokoro no Rizumu Tobichiru Batafurai; lit. 'The Rhythm of the Heart is a Fluttering Butterfly') by doa and "Kissing til i die" by Jun Manaka.

On October 24, 2017, a sequel to the first anime titled Sōten no Ken: Re:Genesis, which aired from April 2 throughout June 18, 2018, on Tokyo MX and other channels. The opening is "Souten no Hate ni" by AK-69 while the ending theme is "Inori no Hoshizora" by Sumire Uesaka. The second opening theme is "Soul Seeker" by Crossfaith while the second ending theme is "Kono Sora wo Subete Kimi ni" (この空をすべて君に) by Hiroya Ozaki. A second season premiered from October 1 to December 17, 2018.

Despite sharing the same title, Sōten no Ken: Re:Genesis is not a direct adaptation of the manga of the same name, but instead picks up from where the 2006 anime series left off and mixes plot elements from the unadapted latter half of the original Sōten no Ken manga and the then-ongoing Re:Genesis manga.
