= Moeyo Ken (manga) =

Japanese manga series

- First tankōbon volume cover

燃えよ剣
- Genre: Historical fantasy
- Manga
- Written by: Ryōtarō Shiba; Emeru Komatsu
- Illustrated by: Yoshiki Kanata
- Published by: Shinchosha
- Imprint: Bunch Comics
- Magazine: Monthly Comic Bunch (October 2021 – March 2024); Comic Bunch Kai (May 2024 – present)
- Original run: October 21, 2021 – present
- Volumes: 5
- icon

Moeyo Ken (Japanese: 燃えよ剣; 'Burn, O Sword') is a Japanese manga series adapted from the novel of the same name by Ryōtarō Shiba. The manga written by Emeru Komatsu and illustrated by Yoshiki Kanata, it started serialization in Shinchosha's seinen manga magazine Monthly Comic Bunch in October 2021. After the magazine's ended its final issue in March 2024, Moeyo Ken was transferred to the renewed Comic Bunch Kai, where it has been serialized since May 2024, with its chapters collected in three tankōbon volumes as of August 2023.

== Publication ==
Originally written by Ryōtarō Shiba based on his Moeyo Ken novel with a script by Emeru Komatsu and illustrated by Yoshiki Kanata, the manga started serialization in Shinchosha's seinen manga magazine Monthly Comic Bunch on October 21, 2021. After the magazine's ended its final issue on March 21, 2024, Moeyo Ken was transferred to the renewed Comic Bunch Kai, where it has been serialized since May 10, 2024. Shinchosha has collected its chapters into individual tankōbon volumes. The first volume was released on May 9, 2022. As of March 7, 2025, five volumes have been released.

=== Volumes ===
No.	Release date	ISBN
1	May 9, 2022	978-4-10-772491-5
2	December 8, 2022	978-4-10-772548-6
3	August 8, 2023	978-4-10-772630-8
4	March 7, 2025	978-4-10-772804-3
5	March 7, 2025	978-4-10-772805-0

== Reception ==
The series was acclaimed by many manga authors, such as Blade of the Immortal's Hiroaki Samura and Record of Ragnarok's Shinya Umemura. Chiruran: Shinsengumi Requiem's Eiji Hashimoto called the series "an immortal masterpiece", while Tsuwamonogatari's Tadataka Hosokawa commented that the story of the series is full of sadness, weakness and conflict.
