= Artiste (manga) =

Japanese manga series

- First tankōbon volume cover

アルティスト (Arutisuto)
- Genre: Coming-of-age; Cooking
- Manga
- Written by: Tarō Samoedo
- Published by: Shinchosha
- Imprint: Bunch Comics
- Magazine: Monthly Comic Bunch
- Original run: September 2016 – May 2024
- Volumes: 10

Artiste (アルティスト, Arutisuto) is a Japanese manga series written and illustrated by Tarō Samoedo. It began serialization in Shinchosha's seinen manga magazine Monthly Comic Bunch in September 2016.

== Synopsis ==
Set in Paris, the series focuses on two restaurant employees, Marco and Gilbert. Marco is a new and cheerful employee at a Parisian restaurant, while Gilbert is a shy and experienced employee who works as a busser.

== Publication ==
Written and illustrated by Tarō Samoedo, Artiste began serialization on Shinchosha's seinen manga magazine Monthly Comic Bunch on September 21, 2016. After the final print issue of the magazine was released on March 21, 2024, the series was transferred to the Kurage Bunch website. Its chapters have been compiled into ten tankōbon volumes as of June 2024.

No.	Release date	ISBN
1	April 8, 2017	978-4-10-771966-9
2	October 7, 2017	978-4-10-772015-3
3	April 9, 2018	978-4-10-772067-2
4	December 7, 2018	978-4-10-772139-6
5	August 9, 2019	978-4-10-772209-6
6	June 9, 2020	978-4-10-772293-5
7	June 9, 2021	978-4-10-772397-0
8	July 7, 2022	978-4-10-772509-7; 978-4-10-772510-3 (SE)
9	May 9, 2023	978-4-10-772598-1
10	June 7, 2024	978-4-10-772722-0; 978-4-10-772684-1 (SE)

== Reception ==
By December 2023, the series had 1.5 million copies in circulation.

The series was nominated for the fourth Next Manga Awards in 2018 in the print category and was ranked fourth out of 50 nominees. The series, alongside My Dress-Up Darling, won the Men's Comic Prize at NTT Solmare's "Minna ga Erabu!! Denshi Comic Taishō 2020" in 2020.
