= Basketball in Japan =

Basketball is included in top sports being played in Japan but it is less popular than football and baseball. Takehiko Inoue's manga series Slam Dunk (1990–1996) is frequently cited as popularizing the sport in the country and for inspiring a generation of players. The number of high school basketball players reached a record high of more than 113,000 boys in 1995, and over 77,000 girls in 1994. The Japan Basketball Association later presented Inoue with a special commendation for his contributions to the sport. However, the numbers have continued to drop since then. Okuyoshi Shinada, a director of the JBA, said in 2007, "We didn't take advantage of the golden opportunity. In the end, compared to soccer, basketball couldn't get beyond the boundaries of school physical education."

== Domestic competition ==
The B. League is a professional basketball league in Japan that was established in 2016. It is a combination of Super League and bj league enforced by FIBA.

B. League has three divisions, with 18 teams in Divisions 1 and 2. Division 3 only has 12 teams.

== International competition ==
Japan is represented in international competitions by the men's national team and the women's national team

=== 1976 World Olympics ===
This was the last major appearance of the National Team at the Olympics. The Women's National Team reached its highest ranking, at 5th place.

=== 2019 FIBA World Cup ===
The Men's National Team was able to enter after a great performance during the qualifiers, even though they ranked 48th in the world. They ranked 31st in the final standings of the competition.

The Women's National Team ranked 9th in this competition.

=== 2020 Tokyo Olympics ===
As host of the Olympics, the men and women's national teams automatically qualified to compete. The men's team placed 11th, and the women's team earned the silver medal.
