= Bow Wow Wata =

Japanese manga series

ガウガウわー太 (Gau-Gau Wāta)
- Manga
- Written by: Umekawa Kazumi
- Published by: Coamix; Shinchosha
- English publisher: NA: Gutsoon! Entertainment
- Magazine: Weekly Comic Bunch
- English magazine: NA: Raijin Comics Monthly
- Original run: November 9, 2001 – May 27, 2004
- Volumes: 11
- Manga

Gau-Gau Wata 2
- Written by: Umekawa Kazumi
- Published by: Ichijinsha
- Magazine: Comic Rex
- Original run: 2004 – 2009
- Volumes: 5

Bow Wow Wata (Japanese: ガウガウわー太, Hepburn: Gaugau Wāta) is a manga by Kazumi Umekawa that was initially serialized in Weekly Comic Bunch from 2001 throughout 2004. After the serialization was pulled from Comic Bunch, it was picked up by Comic Rex, where it was retitled Gaugau Wāta 2, continuing its publication as a monthly serial until 2009. A short-lived English adaptation was published by Gutsoon! Entertainments Raijin Comics which were released in January and May 2004. Only the first 2 volumes were ever released in the United States by Raijin Comics.

== Chapters ==
Volume 1 Chapters

1: Meet Wata
2: Maekawa Sally (Part 1)
3: Meakawa Sally (Part 2)
4: What it Takes to be a Leader
5: When a Black Cat Crosses Your Path
6: Wa-tan
7: The Duel
8: Bad Luck
9: Grains of Rice

Volume 2 Chapters

10: I'm Sorry!
11: Garbage Raid
12: A Cry from the Heart
13: I'm Full
14: Some Other Reason
15: Survival of the Fittest
16: Live and Let Live
17: Taking Your Medicine
18: The Tunnel of Death
19: Oyoh
20: To Forgive is Divine

== Characters ==
Tasuke Yashiro
A second-year high school student who discovers he has the ability to talk to animals but only if he is bitten by or scratched by them first. Tasuke's father wants him to take after him, but Tasuke is against this, since being an animal counselor does not pay the bills.
Misato Funakoshi
The cute third-year student that Tasuke has a crush on. He often refers to her as Misato-senpai, which is a sign of respect for older students in Japan. She was previous owner Wata's and is a third-year transfer at Tasuke's high school. She loves animals and wants to be a veterinarian someday.
Doctor Yashiro
Tasuke's dad and a vet/animal counselor who can speak to animals. Yashiro's ability to talk to animals comes from the fact that he is Komainu, the god of dogs. His wife is Oinari, a Shinto goddess, which explains why Tasuke can talk to animals.
Ms. Murakami
The owner of a perpetually hungry Welsh Corgi named Santa who appears in Volume 2 Chapters 11-17. She likes making and buying bandanas for her adorable pooch.
Hana Oikawa
Misatos' classmate and best friend. She loves scary thing and strange rumors. She gets her driver's license in Volume 2: Chapter 18.
Wata
A 13-year-old mutt, Wata is also a biter - except to Misato- who only knows one command: "Shake." He is loyal and committed to protecting his master at all times. He becomes Tasukes sidekick and companion (and also the young mans link to his crush Misato) when Misatos' father threatens to get rid of Wata because their new apartment doesn't allow pets. Backstory on how Misato meets and takes in Wata can be read in Volume 1: Chapter 6.
Kuro
A young black cat who has been an outcast since her birth, a fact which breaks her little heart. She is diagnosed with intestinal worms at the end of volume 1 at which time she also begins to blame herself for Misato Funakoshi being injured in gym class. She runs away and is rescued by Tasuke before she can commit suicide in the river in volume 2.

Sally
An Irish Setter who gives birth to 9 healthy puppies. A week later it is found by Tasuke that one of her puppies was stuck in the birth canal in a state of suspended animation and is saved via C Section.
Santa
A Welsh Corgi who was bought by his owner at Christmas (hence his festive name) who suffers from EPI (Exocrine Pancreatic Insufficiency) which is a disease that causes the pancreas to be unable to secrete the enzymes needed to help digest proteins and fats. Because of this he is unable to gain weight and is ALWAYS hungry. This constant hunger causes him to develop a split personality that causes trouble for Tasuke, Wata, and his owner Ms. Murakami in Volume 2: Chapters 11-17
Gosaku
A Tanuki(Japaneses Raccoon Dog) who, after his pregnant wife is run over by a car, begins to hate humans. He causes several car crashes by using magic to make a human illusion appear on the road where his wife was hit. He is the main focus of Volume 2: Chapters 18-20 and parts of Volume 3.
Oyoh
Gosakus' deceased mate who was pregnant with pups when she was hit by a car. she had grown to fat after eating to much human food and could not get out of the way fast enough.
