= The Magnificent Bastard: The Legend of Keiji =

Japanese manga series

- First volume cover, featuring Maeda Keiji

花の慶次 -雲のかなたに- (Hana no Keiji: Kumo no Kanata ni)
- Genre: Historical; Samurai
- Created by: Keiichiro Ryu
- Manga
- Written by: Mio Aso
- Illustrated by: Tetsuo Hara
- Published by: Shueisha
- English publisher: NA: Gutsoon! Entertainment (former); Kodansha USA (current)
- Imprint: Jump Comics
- Magazine: Weekly Shōnen Jump
- English magazine: NA: Raijin Comics
- Original run: March 12, 1990 – August 2, 1993
- Volumes: 18
Further information
Video game
Developer	Tose
Publisher	Yojigen
Genre	Fighting
Platform	Super Famicom
Released	November 18, 1994
Manga
Gifū Dōdō!! Naoe Kanetsugu: Maeda Keiji Tsukigatari
Written by	Tetsuo Hara; Nobuhiko Horie
Illustrated by	Yuji Takemura
Published by	Shinchosha
Magazine	Weekly Comic Bunch
Original run	November 7, 2008 – August 27, 2010
Volumes	9
Manga
Gifū Dōdō!! Naoe Kanetsugu: Maeda Keiji Sakegatari
Written by	Tetsuo Hara; Nobuhiko Horie
Illustrated by	Yuji Takemura
Published by	Tokuma Shoten
Magazine	Monthly Comic Zenon
Original run	October 25, 2010 – January 27, 2014
Volumes	10
Anime television series
Kanetsugu & Keiji
Directed by	Bob Shirahata
Produced by	Naoki Miya
Written by	Yasuhiro Imagawa
Music by	Kazsin
Studio	Studio Deen
Original network	TV Tokyo
Original run	July 2, 2013 – December 17, 2013
Episodes	25
Manga
Gifū Dōdō!! Naoe Kanetsugu: Maeda Keiji Hanagatari
Written by	Tetsuo Hara; Nobuhiko Horie
Illustrated by	Masato Deguchi
Published by	Tokuma Shoten
Magazine	Monthly Comic Zenon
Original run	March 24, 2014 – October 25, 2018
Volumes	14
Manga
Keiji's Kabuki Adventure
Written by	Tetsuo Hara; Nobuhiko Horie
Illustrated by	Masato Deguchi
Published by	Tokuma Shoten
English publisher	NA: Comikey
Magazine	Monthly Comic Zenon
Original run	February 25, 2019 – present
Volumes	23
- icon

The Magnificent Bastard: The Legend of Keiji (花の慶次 -雲のかなたに-, Hana no Keiji: Kumo no Kanata ni; lit. 'Keiji of the Flowers:Beyond the Clouds'), also known simply as Keiji, is a Japanese manga, based on the novel Ichi-Mu-An Fūryūki by Keiichiro Ryu, adapted by Mio Aso and illustrated by Tetsuo Hara. It was serialized in Shueisha's Weekly Shōnen Jump from March 1990 to August 1993. The story serves as a fictionalized account of the life of Maeda Keiji. It was formerly licensed for English release in North America by Raijin Comics. Kodansha USA licensed the series in 2025.

The series has had over 17 million copies in circulation.

== Characters ==
Maeda Keiji (前田 慶次)
A tall military commander who is said to be the best kabukimono on Earth. Although the son of Takigawa Kazumasu, he was adopted by Maeda Toshihisa, Toshiie's older brother. Despite this, Toshiie dislikes him. A free-spirited warrior who lives by his own will. His beloved horse is named Matsukaze (松風).
Sutemaru (捨丸)
A pint-sized shinobi who formerly served Yotsui Shume. Even though his younger brother was trampled to death by Keiji and his horse Matsukaze, he becomes fascinated with Keiji to the point of infatuation and becomes his follower.
Iwabei (岩兵衛)
A resident from the Village of Seven Faces who has the face of an oni. He fought against Keiji at first in order to rescue his adoptive daughter Ofū, but comes to admire Keiji's character and eventually becomes one of his followers. He possesses enormous strength, as well as the ability to read minds.
Ofū (おふう)
Matsu (まつ)
Maeda Toshiie (前田 利家)

== Media ==
=== Manga ===
The Magnificent Bastard: The Legend of Keiji is based on the novel Ichi-Mu-An Fūryūki (一夢庵風流記) by Keiichiro Ryu, adapted by Mio Aso and illustrated by Tetsuo Hara. It was originally published as a one-shot manga in Shueisha's shōnen manga anthology Weekly Shōnen Jump on November 27, 1990. It was later serialized in the same magazine from March 12, 1990, to August 2, 1993. 18 tankōbon volumes were published by Shueisha under the Jump Comics imprint between July 10, 1990, and November 4, 1993. The series was republished in a ten-volume bunkoban edition, released between March 18 and November 18, 1999. A 15-volume kanzenban edition by Tokuma Shoten was released from September 30, 2004, to October 29, 2005.

In 2003, an English version of the manga, under the shortened title Keiji, was serialized in the short-lived anthology Raijin Comics published by the now-defunct Gutsoon! Entertainment, where the first 26 chapters were printed, until Raijin Comics ceased its publication in 2004. No collected volumes were published.

In February 2025, Kodansha USA announced that it had licensed the series for English publication, with the first volume released on December 9, 2025.

==== Spin-offs ====
A Keiji spin-off titled Gifū Dōdō!! Naoe Kanetsugu: Maeda Keiji Tsukigatari (義風堂々!! 直江兼続 ～前田慶次月語り～), written by Tetsuo Hara and Nobuhiko Horie and illustrated by Yuji Takemura, began serialization in Shinchosha's Weekly Comic Bunch on November 7, 2008. The series was stopped on August 27, 2010, after Weekly Comic Bunch ended its publication. Nine volumes were published.

In 2010, a sequel titled Gifū Dōdō!! Naoe Kanetsugu: Maeda Keiji Sakegatari (義風堂々!! 直江兼続 ～前田慶次酒語り～) started in the brand new magazine Monthly Comic Zenon by Tokuma Shoten on October 25, 2010, and finished on January 27, 2014. Its chapters were collected in ten volumes.

A final arc, titled Gifū Dōdō!! Naoe Kanetsugu: Maeda Keiji Hanagatari (義風堂々!! 直江兼続 ～前田慶次花語り～), written by Hara and Horie and illustrated by Masato Deguchi, was published in Monthly Comic Zenon from March 24, 2014, to October 25, 2018. Its chapters were collected in 14 volumes.

Another series, titled Keiji's Kabuki Adventure (前田慶次 かぶき旅), began serialization in Monthly Comic Zenon on February 25, 2019. As of November 20, 2026, 23 volumes have been published. The series is licensed in English by Comikey.

=== Related media ===
Shueisha released an audiobook version of Hana no Keiji in December 1993. The audiobook stars Akio Ōtsuka as the voice of Keiji Maeda.

A Hana no Keiji video game was developed by TOSE and published by Yojigen for the Super Famicom on November 18, 1994. It is a competitive weapon-based fighting game which adapts the storyline of the manga from the beginning and up until the Fūma Kotarō arc.

Gifū Dōdō!! Naoe Kanetsugu: Maeda Keiji Sake-gatari was adapted into a 25-episode anime television series, titled Gifū Dōdō!! Kanetsugu to Keiji, aired on TV Tokyo from July 2 to December 17, 2013. It was streamed on Crunchyroll.
