= Gunka no Baltzar =

Japanese manga series

- First tankōbon volume cover

軍靴のバルツァー (Gunka no Barutsuā)
- Manga
- Written by: Michitsune Nakajima
- Published by: Shinchosha; Kodansha
- Imprint: Bunch Comics (1–14); Shōnen Magazine Comics (15–)
- Magazine: Monthly Comic Bunch; (January 21, 2011 – August 19, 2021); Bessatsu Shōnen Magazine; (August 9, 2022 – present)
- Original run: January 21, 2011 – present
- Volumes: 21
- Manga

Gaiden: Ginkai no Jurij
- Written by: Kyōichi
- Published by: Shinchosha
- Imprint: Bunch Comics
- Magazine: Kurage Bunch
- Original run: April 20, 2021 – May 10, 2022
- Volumes: 2

Gunka no Baltzar (Japanese: 軍靴のバルツァー, Hepburn: Gunka no Barutsuā) is a Japanese manga series written and illustrated by Michitsune Nakajima. It began serialization in Shinchosha's seinen manga magazine Monthly Comic Bunch magazine in January 2011. It was later transferred to Kodansha's shōnen manga magazine Bessatsu Shōnen Magazine in August 2022.

== Plot ==
The story takes place in a fictionalized version of 19th century Europe in which one of its countries, Weissen, stands as one of the strongest regional military powers on the continent. Major Bernd Baltzar is a young and ambitious rising star in the Weissen military, until he suddenly receives new orders that he is to be sent to the previously neutral country of Baselland as an advisor and instructor for the nation's military academy.

However, Baltzar finds his work cut out for him when he sees the poor state of Baselland's military, which uses both obsolete tactics and weaponry. In addition to trying to modernize Baselland's military, Baltzar also finds himself getting caught up in Baselland's internal politics between its two feuding crown princes, as well as international intrigue as Weissen competes with its rival Ezreich over influence within Baselland. Baltzar will have to utilize all of his knowledge and cunning to ensure both his own and his students' safety.

== Characters ==
Bernd Baltzar
Voiced by: Kishō Taniyama (drama CD)
Baltzar is a rising star in the Weissen military with a keen mind for military strategy, tactics, and politics. However, despite his skills and accomplishments, Baltzar is inexplicably transferred to Baselland as a military advisor and instructor, where he becomes responsible for a class of young Baselland military cadets.
Rudolph von Liebknecht
Voiced by: Shin-ichiro Miki (drama CD)
A mysterious agent who sows chaos and destruction throughout Europe for his own mysterious ends. He also has a past with Baltzar.
Reiner August Winklefield
Voiced by: Wataru Hatano (drama CD)
One of the crown princes of Baselland, Reiner is a strict and pragmatic ruler who seeks closer ties with Weissen in order to modernize his country.
Helmut Marx von Babbel
Voiced by: Ayahi Takagaki (drama CD)
A young cavalry cadet in the Baselland Military Academy, she is actually a girl posing as a boy in order to attend the school.
Dieter Strunz
Voiced by: Daiki Yamashita (drama CD)
An artillery cadet who is fascinated with modern technology, and is the heir to Baselland's largest railroad company.
Paul Breitner
Voiced by: Satoru Murakami (drama CD)
An artillery cadet who, while not the best performing student in his class, possesses a worldly knowledge Baltzar acknowledges is valuable.
Marcel Jansen
Voiced by: Yoshitaka Yamaya (drama CD)
An infantry cadet who is also a naturally talented marksman.
Thomas Linke
Voiced by: Junji Tachibana (drama CD)
An infantry cadet who often struggles in training, requiring his friend Marcel to look out for him.

== Publication ==
Written and illustrated by Michitsune Nakajima, Gunka no Baltzar was serialized in Shinchosha's seinen manga magazine Monthly Comic Bunch from January 21, 2011, to August 19, 2021. It later began serialization on Kodansha's shōnen manga magazine Bessatsu Shōnen Magazine on August 9, 2022. The series chapters have been collected into twenty-one tankōbon volumes as of July 2026.

A spin-off manga written and illustrated by Kyōichi, titled Gunka no Baltzar: Ginkai no Jurij, was serialized on Shinchosha's Kurage Bunch manga website from April 20, 2021, to May 10, 2022. Its chapters were collected in two volumes.

No.	Release date	ISBN
1	July 8, 2011	978-4-10-771626-2
2	December 9, 2011	978-4-10-771642-2
3	July 9, 2012	978-4-10-771671-2
4	December 8, 2012	978-4-10-771690-3; 978-4-10-771691-0 (LE)
5	July 9, 2013	978-4-10-771712-2
6	February 8, 2014	978-4-10-771737-5
7	December 9, 2014	978-4-10-771792-4
8	December 9, 2015	978-4-10-771863-1
9	November 9, 2016	978-4-10-771933-1
10	July 7, 2017	978-4-10-771995-9
11	May 9, 2018	978-4-10-772082-5; 978-4-10-772052-8 (LE)
12	August 9, 2019	978-4-10-772211-9
13	December 9, 2020	978-4-10-772349-9
14	September 9, 2021	978-4-10-772417-5
15	February 9, 2023	978-4-06-530338-2
16	July 7, 2023	978-4-06-532172-0
17	December 7, 2023	978-4-06-533884-1
18	June 7, 2024	978-4-06-535804-7
19	December 9, 2024	978-4-06-537757-4
20	September 9, 2025	978-4-06-540659-5
21	July 9, 2026	978-4-06-543905-0

== Reception ==
The series had 1 million copies in circulation by June 2022.

The series was ranked tenth in the Nationwide Bookstore Employees' Recommended Comics of 2013.
