= Makoto Niwano =

Japanese manga artist (born 1964)

- にわの まこと
- Born: May 1, 1964 (age 62); Sendai, Kagoshima, Japan
- Notable work: Bomber Girl
- Style: Manga

Makoto Niwano (にわの まこと, Niwano Makoto; born May 1, 1964) is a Japanese manga artist known for several works, including The Momotaroh, Bomber Girl and Jinnairyū Jyūjyutsu Butouden Majimakun Suttobasu!!. Niwano has also written a manga adaptation of Deltora Quest which was adapted into an anime series, and was a mentor to Takeshi Obata of Hikaru no Go and Death Note fame.

== Works ==
- The Momotaroh (1987-1989)
  - The Momotaroh Part. 2 (2004)
- Chō Kidō Bōhatsu Soccer Yarō Libero no Takeda (1991-1992)
- Bomber Girl (1993)
  - Bomber Girl Crush! (2001)
  - Bomber Girl XXX (2004)
- Jinnairyū Jyūjyutsu Butouden Majimakun Suttobasu!! (1995-1998)
  - Jinnairyū Jyūjyutsu Rurouden Majima, Hazeru!! (2009)
- Tōshin Susanoo (1998)
- Base Boys (1999)
- Sexual Package (2001)
- Turkey Junkie (2001)
- Prosecutor Ai (2003) (illustrator)
- Deltora Quest (2005-2008)
- Momotaroh vs Rei Majima (2007)
- AD Boy (2009)
