= The First President of Japan =

Japanese manga series

- Cover of the third volume of The First President of Japan, published by Shueisha in April 2000

日本国初代大統領 桜木健一郎 (Nippon Koku Shodai Daitōryō Sakuragi Kenichirō)
- Genre: Political thriller
- Manga
- Written by: Yoshiki Hidaka
- Illustrated by: Ryuji Tsugihara
- Published by: Shueisha
- English publisher: NA: Gutsoon! Entertainment
- Magazine: Bart
- English magazine: NA: Raijin Comics
- Original run: 1998 – 2000
- Volumes: 3
- Manga

The President of Japan: Sakurazaka Mantarō
- Written by: Yoshiki Hidaka
- Illustrated by: Kenji Yoshida
- Published by: Shinchosha
- Magazine: Weekly Comic Bunch
- Original run: 2003 – 2006
- Volumes: 16

The First President of Japan (Japanese: 日本国初代大統領 桜木健一郎, Hepburn: Nippon Koku Shodai Daitōryō Sakuragi Kenichirō) is a Japanese manga series written by Yoshiki Hidaka and illustrated by Ryuji Tsugihara.

== Plot ==
For the first time in Japan's history there is a direct election for the Prime Minister office that gives the winner the powers of a president, and Kenichiro Sakuragi is elected. However, on the same day the North Korean army invades South Korea starting the Second Korean War. Meanwhile, the Chinese government see an opportunity to threaten Japan in the amidst of the confusion Sakuragi now has to resolve.

== Publication ==
The writer Yoshiki Hidaka, a political analyst of Japan–United States relations, worked along with illustrator Ryuji Tsugihara in The First President of Japan. The seinen manga was published in the Bart magazine of the publisher Shueisha between 1998 and 2000. In Japan, it was first published in tankōbon format through a single omnibus edition in December 1998. Then a new edition of three volumes was published through the Super Playboy Comics label from December 1999 to April 2000. An American edition was published by Gutsoon! Entertainment on its magazine Raijin Comics, starting from the second issue in January 2003. The graphic novel version had four volumes that were published between July 9, 2003, and January 6, 2004.

A spin-off series, also written by Hidaka, but this time illustrated by Kenji Yoshida, was published under the name The President of Japan: Sakurazaka Mantarō (日本国大統領 桜坂満太郎, Nippon Koku Daitōryō Sakurazaka Mantarō). Serialized in Shinchosha's magazine Weekly Comic Bunch, it spawned sixteen tankōbon published between November 9, 2003, and September 8, 2006.

== Reception ==
John Jakala from Anime News Network (ANN) was surprised by its first chapter because of the absence of on-screen appearance of the main character on it. He considered it "a daring move" but said "it pays off: I found myself anxious to meet Sakuragi, and curious to see how he will deal with all of the political crises erupting around him". However, Jakala affirmed the first actual appearance of Sakuragi probably would be more impactful if his face had not been shown on a Jumbotron at the end of the chapter. "Still, it was a cute bit", he said. The third chapter had "a very powerful" scene about the formation of a lifelong friendship between Sakuragi and a childhood's friend. Jakala deemed it "inspirational without becoming overly sentimental". On the other hand, he criticized the "'excited' word balloons" in uppercase that seem to be shouting at him as "painfully purple". In the end, Jakala said that "certain situations or lines seem a bit too melodramatic, but overall the series maintains an engaging tone". About its tone, Greg McElhatton of Read About Comics stated it "feature[s] overly dramatic theatrics in the forms of speeches and actions by the protagonist" — which led to a comparison to Eagle: The Making of an Asian-American President.

Overall, Jakala said "the series has grown on [him] over time. Part of the reason is that Hidaka isn't just writing about dry political systems in the abstract; he humanizes concepts by crafting various characters that we follow through the tumultuous events depicted in this book". Both Jakala and McElhatton highlighted and praised the fact that although Sakuragi is depicted as "handsome, suave, and poised" (Jakala), "decisive, smart, and charismatic" (McElhatton), "Yoshiki remembers to keep his character human; he's got his flaws, and his doubts that he hides from the public. In the end, it just makes him all the more likable" (McElhatton). In Jakala's opinion, "One of the strongest things about this series is Sakuragi's character" because "Hidaka hasn't gone too far in making Sakuragi unbelievably perfect". Conversely, Jason Thompson, writing for ANN, considered the depiction of "a badass Japanese politician, who stands up to America, China and North Korea, more comedic than believable".

Jakala commended the art because "Tsugihara helps distinguish characters by giving everyone distinctive looks". Further, he appreciated how the detailing on body language and facial expressions, saying, "In one scene, I could almost feel the intensity of Sakuragi's gaze coming off the page". RAC's commentator also asserted there are "lots of careful shots of people's faces to show their reactions", and deemed Tsugihara's art very suitable to the series, calling it "a solid, straight-forward style" and comparing it to storyboards for a television show or a film.

Patrick King of Animefringe labeled it "a frighteningly realistic political thriller for the sophisticated reader" and said fans of The West Wing would probably "find this series appealing". A similar comparison was done by RAC's critic who affirmed that "If this was a television show, it would be the Japanese equivalent of The West Wing, able to make politics interesting to a wide audience though characters and situations that draw its viewers in". King considered it "A very good series", while McElhatton declared, "One of the consistently best serials in the Raijin Comics anthology, The First President of Japan is one of those series that I think almost anyone who likes 'real world' stories would appreciate". In a 2015 list, Matt White of Publishers Weekly ranked it among the "12 Great Comics On Presidential Politics". On the other hand, Thompson, said "It's sort of like a faltering unintentional prototype for The Legend of Koizumi" and that "it ends very abruptly".
