= Slam Dunk (manga) =

Japanese manga series

- First tankōbon volume cover, featuring Hanamichi Sakuragi
- Genre: Comedy; Coming-of-age; Sports
- Manga
- Written by: Takehiko Inoue
- Published by: Shueisha
- English publisher: AUS: Madman Entertainment; NA: Viz Media; Gutsoon! Entertainment (former); SG: Chuang Yi
- Imprint: Jump Comics
- Magazine: Weekly Shōnen Jump
- English magazine: NA: Raijin Comics (former); Shonen Jump
- Original run: October 1, 1990 – June 17, 1996
- Volumes: 31
- Anime television series
- Directed by: Nobutaka Nishizawa
- Written by: Nobuaki Kishima; Yoshiyuki Suga
- Music by: Takanobu Masuda (#1–61); BMF (#62–101)
- Studio: Toei Animation
- Licensed by: NA: Toei Animation Inc.
- Original network: ANN (TV Asahi)
- English network: AU: Network Ten; SEA: AXN, Animax Asia
- Original run: October 16, 1993 – March 23, 1996
- Episodes: 101
- Anime film
- Directed by: Nobutaka Nishizawa
- Studio: Toei Animation
- Released: March 12, 1994
- Runtime: 30 minutes
- Anime film

Conquer the Nation, Hanamichi Sakuragi!
- Directed by: Toshihiko Arisako
- Studio: Toei Animation
- Released: July 9, 1994
- Runtime: 45 minutes
- Anime film

Shohoku's Greatest Challenge!
- Directed by: Hiroyuki Kakudō
- Studio: Toei Animation
- Released: March 12, 1995
- Runtime: 40 minutes
- Anime film

Howling Basketman Spirit!!
- Directed by: Masayuki Akihi
- Studio: Toei Animation
- Released: July 15, 1995
- Runtime: 40 minutes
- Anime film
- The First Slam Dunk (2022)
- icon

Slam Dunk (stylized in all caps) is a Japanese manga series written and illustrated by Takehiko Inoue. It was serialized in Shueisha's shōnen manga magazine Weekly Shōnen Jump from October 1990 to June 1996, with the chapters collected into 31 tankōbon volumes. The story follows Hanamichi Sakuragi, a brash and impulsive high school student who joins a basketball team at Shohoku High School, located in the Shōnan area of Japan.

The manga was adapted into an anime television series by Toei Animation which aired from October 1993 to March 1996. The series has been broadcast worldwide, gaining popularity especially in Japan, Europe, and several other Asian countries. In December 2022, an anime feature film titled The First Slam Dunk was released in Japan.

Slam Dunk has 185 million copies in circulation, making it one of the best-selling manga series in history. In 1994, it received the 40th Shogakukan Manga Award for the shōnen category. In Japan, Slam Dunk has been regarded as one of the greatest sports manga series of all time and has been cited as a contributor in popularizing basketball among Japanese youth during the 1990s. In 2010, Inoue received special commendations from the Japan Basketball Association for helping popularize basketball in Japan.

== Plot ==
Hanamichi Sakuragi is a high school delinquent and gang leader. He is very unpopular among girls, having been rejected fifty times. In his first year at Shohoku High School, Sakuragi meets Haruko Akagi, the girl of his dreams, and is overjoyed when she is not repulsed or frightened of him like other girls. Haruko recognizes Sakuragi's athleticism and introduces him to the Shohoku basketball team. Sakuragi is reluctant to play basketball due to his inexperience with sports and his belief that basketball is a game for losers. This belief came about because the most recent girl to reject him had favored a basketball player. Despite his immaturity and temper, he joins the team to impress Haruko, and proves to be a natural athlete.

Sakuragi later develops a genuine love for the sport despite initially playing because of his crush. Around this time, the star rookie and "girl magnet" Kaede Rukawa joins the team. Sakuragi views him as a bitter rival in basketball and romance, as Haruko has an unrequited crush on Rukawa. Shortly after, two additional members rejoin the team: Hisashi Mitsui, a skilled three-point shooter and ex–junior high school MVP; and Ryota Miyagi, a short but fast point guard. The four players work together to fulfill team captain Takenori Akagi's dream of winning the national championship. After defeating one of the powerhouse teams at the national high school championship, the misfits gain publicity, and the once little-known Shohoku basketball team becomes an all-star contender in Japan.

== Production ==
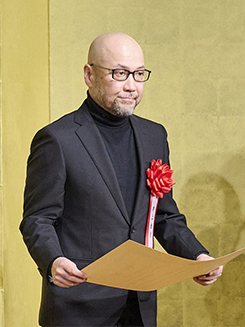
Takehiko Inoue was inspired to write Slam Dunk based on his high school years

Takehiko Inoue was inspired to create Slam Dunk from his love of basketball, which he has had since high school. Before starting Slam Dunk, he created a one-shot manga titled Aka ga Suki (赤が好き), which was published in Weekly Shōnen Jump Summer Special in 1990. The one-shot featured an early prototype of Hanamichi Sakuragi and Haruko Akagi, with a story and character dynamics that laid the groundwork for Slam Dunk. After he began working on the series, Inoue was surprised to receive letters from readers who had begun playing the sport due to his manga. His editor told him "basketball was a taboo in this world." Due to these letters, Inoue decided he wanted to draw better basketball games in the series. With the series, the author wanted to demonstrate the feelings and thoughts that some athletes might have when they win, lose or improve at their sport. When he began work on Vagabond, Inoue noted that his work on Slam Dunk had a simpler perspective on life as he focused more on victories and success.

With the series, Inoue wanted readers to feel achievements and love for the sport. Thinking that his success as a manga artist was largely due to basketball, Inoue organized a Slam Dunk scholarship for Japanese students as he wanted to give back to the sport by increasing its popularity in Japan. However, when asked about the response from readers to basketball, Inoue commented that although Slam Dunk is technically a basketball manga, its story could have been told with other sports such as football. He added that the manga's artwork was more "mangalike" compared to his newer works such as Real. His experiences with basketball also influenced the story of Slam Dunk. As a youth, Inoue began playing basketball to become popular with girls, but later developed an interest in the sport itself. This experience is mirrored in the character Hanamichi Sakuragi, who began playing basketball to impress a girl, only to later grow truly fond of the game. Inoue attended the NBA Finals in the United States and the 1992 Summer Olympics in Barcelona as "research" for the manga.

== Media ==
=== Manga ===
Written and illustrated by Takehiko Inoue, Slam Dunk was serialized in Shueisha's shōnen manga magazine Weekly Shōnen Jump from October 1, 1990, to June 17, 1996. The 276 individual chapters were originally collected in 31 tankōbon volumes under Shueisha's Jump Comics imprint, with the first being published on February 8, 1991, and the final volume on October 3, 1996. It was later reassembled into 24 kanzenban volumes under the Jump Comics Deluxe imprint from March 19, 2001, to February 2, 2002. A 20 volume shinsōban edition was published between June 1 and September 1, 2018. On November 8, 2022, a book imitating an issue of Weekly Shōnen Jump and collecting 24 select chapters of the original manga was published under the title Slam Dunk Jump.

In North America, an English version of Slam Dunk was published by the now-defunct Gutsoon! Entertainment, which serialized the title in their manga anthology Raijin Comics from 2002 to 2004. Five collected volumes were published under Gutsoon's Raijin Graphic Novels imprint. They were released from July 2, 2003, until May 5, 2004. After Gutsoon! went out of business, the license for Slam Dunk was purchased by Viz Media, which published a preview of the series in the December 2007 issue of the North American edition of Shonen Jump. Slam Dunk began serialization in the magazine, starting with the May 2008 issue, as well as in tankōbon format with the first being published on September 2, 2008. The 31st and final volume was released on December 3, 2013. In June 2026, Viz Media announced that it will release the series in a deluxe edition starting in Q2 2027.

==== 10 Days After ====
In 2004, Inoue produced an epilogue titled Slam Dunk: 10 Days After, which was drawn on 23 chalkboards on the former campus of the defunct Misaki High School located in Kanagawa Prefecture, and was held for public exhibition for three days between December 3 and 5. The epilogue, along with coverage of the event, was printed in the February 2005 issue of Switch magazine. A documentary of the event was released on DVD in May 2005. The epilogue was published in book form by Flower under the title Slam Dunk 10 Days After Complete on April 10, 2009.

=== Anime series ===
Cover of the first DVD volume of Slam Dunk, published by Geneon and Toei Animation

An anime series, consisting of 101 episodes, was produced by Toei Animation and directed by Nobutaka Nishizawa. It was first broadcast on TV Asahi from October 16, 1993, to March 23, 1996. The anime followed the manga storyline, but left out the National Tournament games. Toei Video compiled the episodes into a series of seventeen DVDs which were released in Japan from December 10, 2004, to May 21, 2005. Toei once again collected the series in three DVD boxes during 2008. All the three boxes have a total of seventeen discs. To celebrate 20 years since its broadcast, the anime was released on five Blu-ray sets from July 11, 2014, to March 13, 2015.

Toei Animation and Geneon briefly teamed up to release the anime on DVD in North America after the manga was discontinued, though this was also discontinued after only a few volumes. The first DVD was released on March 15, 2005, and volume 4 was the last one released on June 14 of that same year, before they were cancelled. Various episodes from the series were also downloadable in IGN's Direct2Drive service. Toei made the series available for streaming on Crunchyroll in 2008. Joost also started streaming the series in May 2009.

The music was composed by Takanobu Masuda (from episode 1 to 61) and BMF (from episode 62 to 101). Three CD soundtracks were published during the airing of the series in Japan. The openings, ending and other two themes were collected into the CD soundtrack The Best of TV Animation Slam Dunk, released on July 21, 2003.

=== Anime films ===
Four anime films were produced by Toei Animation from 1994 to 1995 while the manga and TV series were still running. They contain largely new material that is either only hinted at or is not presented in the manga. From August 1 to 4, 2006, NHK broadcast all four movies as part of its satellite networks NHK BS-2's Summer Anime Choice line-up, and TV Osaka aired the last three movies from January 3 to 8, 2007. All the films were collected into a DVD box named Slam Dunk The Movie, which was released on December 10, 2004.

The first film, simply titled Slam Dunk, premiered on March 12, 1994. Set after Shohoku's practice game against Ryonan (before the second half of episode 20), the film focuses on a practice game against Takezono High. Before the game, Sakuragi runs into Yoko Shimura, the girl who rejects him in the very first scene of the series, and Oda, the basketball player she rejected him for. Zenkoku Seiha da! Sakuragi Hanamichi, (Note: 全国制覇だ! 桜木花道; lit. 'Conquer the Nation, Hanamichi Sakuragi!') released on July 9, 1994, is the second film from the series. It happens during Shohoku's 4th round qualifying game against Tsukubu High (between the first half of episode 36). The film features original characters including Godai, an old friend of Akagi and Kogure's, Rango, a wild show-off who is in love with Haruko and quarrels with Sakuragi, and Coach Kawasaki, a former pupil of Anzai-sensei. Shohoku Saidai no Kiki! Moero Sakuragi Hanamichi (Note: 湘北最大の危機! 燃えろ桜木花道; lit. "Shohoku's Greatest Challenge! Burning Hanamichi Sakuragi") was released on March 4, 1995. Set after Shohoku's loss to Kainan, and during a practice match against Ryokufu High (between episode 61). Hoero Basukettoman Tamashii!! Hanamichi to Rukawa no Atsuki Natsu, (Note: 吠えろバスケットマン魂!! 花道と流川の熱き夏; lit. 'Howling Basketman Spirit!! Hanamichi and Rukawa's Hot Summer') which was released one June 15, 1995, tells that Rukawa's middle school kouhai Ichiro Mizusawa will be paralyzed soon and wishes to have one last game against Rukawa (between the first half of episode 62).

On January 7, 2021, Slam Dunk's author Takehiko Inoue announced on his Twitter account that the series would receive a new anime film by Toei Animation titled The First Slam Dunk. Inoue is the director and writer of the film, with Yasuyuki Ebara designing the characters. It premiered in Japan on December 3, 2022.

=== Video games ===
Numerous video games based on the series, mostly developed by Banpresto and produced by Bandai, have been published for the Japanese market. Two basketball sims titled Slam Dunk Gakeppuchi no Kesshō League (Note: スラムダンクがけっぷちの決勝リーグ, Gakeppuchi no Kesshō Rīgu) and Slam Dunk 2 were released for the Game Boy. The Super Famicom had three games, Slam Dunk: Shikyou Gekitotsu, (Note: スラムダンク 四強激突!!, Suramu Danku) Slam Dunk 2: IH Yosen Kanzenban!!, (Note: スラムダンク2 IH予選完全版!!, Suramu Danku: : IH Yosen Kanzenban!! Shi Tsuyo Gekitotsu) and SD Heat Up!!. Slam Dunk games have also been released for the Game Gear, Mega Drive, and Sega Saturn. Characters of the series also appear in the Nintendo DS games Jump Super Stars and Jump Ultimate Stars.

=== Other media ===
A novel depicting an original story written by Yoshiyuki Suga was published on December 2, 1994. Illustrations from Slam Dunk are included in the art book Inoue Takehiko Illustrations, which was published on June 4, 1997, and Plus/Slam Dunk Illustrations 2, which followed on April 3, 2020. Slam Dunk Shōri-gaku, a book written by sports psychologist Shuichi Tsuji on the "Psychology of Winning" and using Slam Dunk as a reference, was published on October 5, 2000.

== Reception ==
=== Manga ===
Slam Dunk was awarded the 40th Shogakukan Manga Award in the shōnen category in 1994. In a poll of close to 79,000 Japanese for the 10th Japan Media Arts Festival in 2006, Slam Dunk was voted the #1 manga of all time. In a 2009 survey from Oricon, it was ranked first as the manga that fans wanted to be turned into a live-action film. In November 2014, readers of Media Factory's Da Vinci magazine voted Slam Dunk as the fourth Weekly Shōnen Jump's greatest manga series of all time. It ranked second, only behind Kingdom, on the first annual Tsutaya Comic Awards' All-Time Best Section in 2017. On TV Asahi's Manga Sōsenkyo 2021 poll, in which 150,000 people voted for their top 100 manga series, Slam Dunk ranked third, behind only One Piece and Demon Slayer: Kimetsu no Yaiba.

The English translation of the manga was listed as one of the best comics of 2008 by Publishers Weekly. Similarly, the Young Adult Library Services Association named the first volume one of its "Great Graphic Novels for Teens" in early 2009. French newspaper Le Figaro selected the series as one of their six recommended manga featured at the 2019 Paris Book Fair.

==== Sales ====
Slam Dunk is one of the best-selling manga series in history. Its collected volumes sold over 100 million copies in Japan by 2004, over 118 million by 2012, and over 121 million by 2014. By 2017, the series had over 170 million copies in circulation worldwide. By 2025, the series had over 185 million copies in circulation worldwide. Until it was broken in 2002, volumes 21 through 23 of Slam Dunk held the record for initial printing of a manga at 2.5 million copies. The print version of Slam Dunk: 10 Days After was popular, having initially ranked sixth and then 15th in Oricon's weekly ranking of manga. The first six volumes of the 2018 shinsōban edition of the original manga all reached the top eight of their release week, with the highest being the first volume at number two. This resulted in Slam Dunk being the fourth best-selling manga of 2018 with 5.2 million copies sold, and the ninth top-selling media franchise of 2018, with estimated sales of ¥3.4 billion.

Slam Dunk was the third best-selling manga series in the first half of 2023 (period between November 2022 and May 2023), with 4.2 million copies sold.

==== Critical reception ====
Carlo Santos of Anime News Network wrote that "With solid characters, eye-popping action, and a classic underdog story, Slam Dunk is what all manga series (and basketball players) should aspire to be: the complete package." Based on the first volume however, his colleague Carl Kimlinger said it came off as more of a romantic comedy than a sports manga as it focused on establishing the cast. Santos opined that its the stuff that happens off the court that really makes up the manga's heart and soul as each character has a story to tell and a goal to reach, with the court simply providing a stage for them to "act out these universal struggles." Similarly, Kris Kosaka of The Japan Times wrote that Slam Dunk is not your typical sports story dominated by on-the-court heroics, but Inoue's love of basketball is evident on every page.

Sports Illustrated's Ben Sin wrote that there are many reasons why Slam Dunk is so beloved, including a hilarious rivalry between the main character and his teammate, a handsome star player with a large female fanbase, and "many other characters and subplots which have since become a crucial part of manga lore." Sin also proclaimed Inoue to have the greatest mix of serious and goofy toned artwork in the history of comics, "Inoue can draw a stunningly detailed and emotional portrait of a human being in one panel and then do a 180 on that character's facial features the next." Kimlinger called Sakuragi an "inspired choice" for a lead character as he is a thug with a hair-trigger temper and all the wrong motivations, but said he does the "seemingly impossible" and balances likeability and extreme hubris thanks to humorous scenes. Santos wrote that while Sakuragi may not have the "mind-blowing superhuman skills" we normally associate with shōnen protagonists, watching him grow into a sportsman and decent human being is just as exciting. Despite having some "school-punk" character designs that are generally considered comedic nowadays, Santos called the art solid for its visual flow and sense of motion.

=== Anime ===
The anime adaptation has also been very popular in Japan. In TV Asahi's 2005 Top 100 Anime survey of multiple age groups, Slam Dunk ranked as the eighth most popular anime. In another poll from TV Asahi but developed by a website, the series ranked tenth. The home video release of the anime also had good sales, having appeared on Oricon's Japanese Animation DVD and Blu-ray rankings.

The anime films performed well at the box office. The first three films released between 1994 and 1995 grossed ¥2.47 billion, ¥1.9 billion and ¥2.16 billion in Japan, respectively, for a combined ¥6.53 billion ($69.42 million) grossed in Japan by 1995. The First Slam Dunk, released in 2022, grossed over $281 million worldwide as of August 2024, becoming one of the top ten highest-grossing anime films of all time.

== Legacy and impact ==
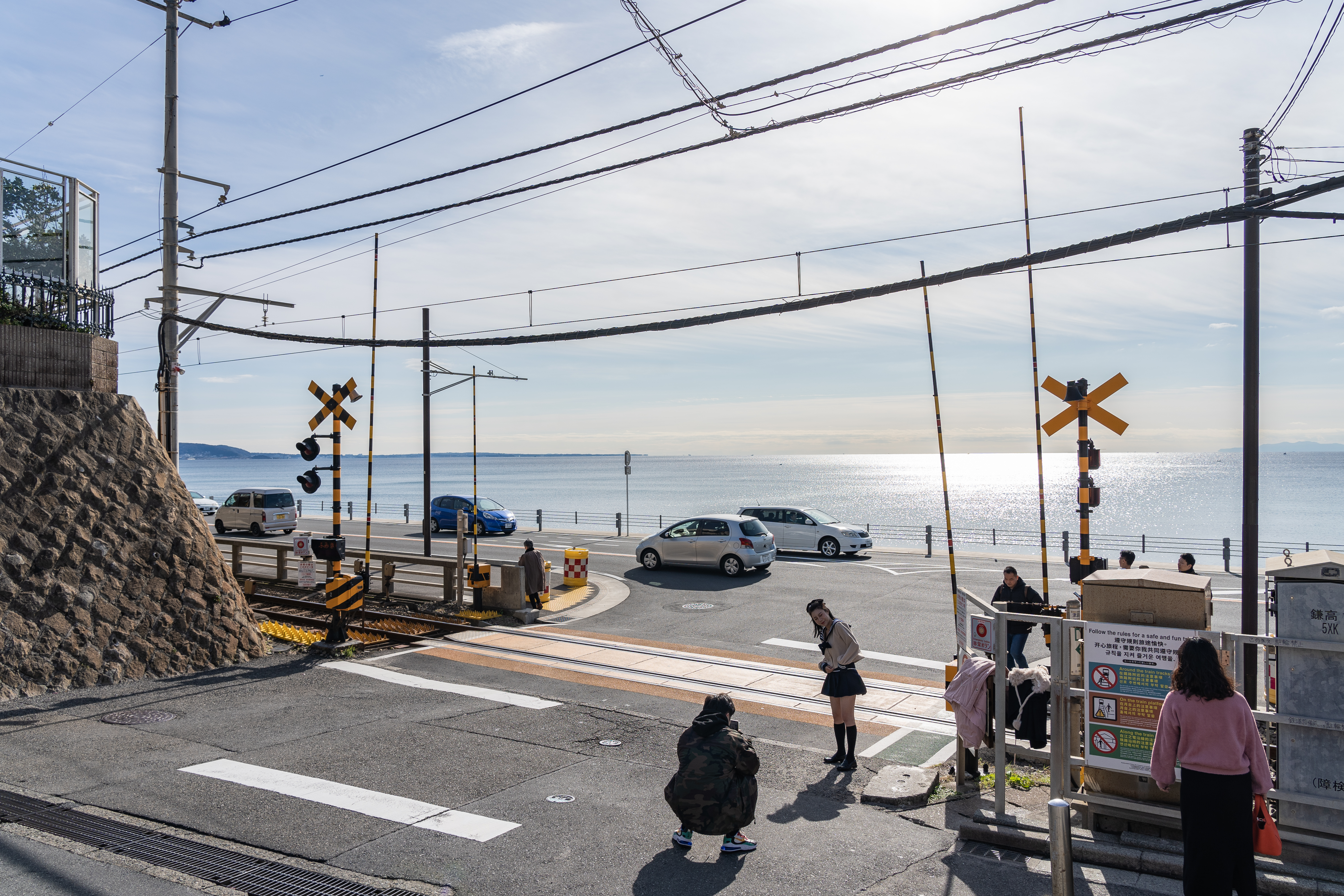
The Kamakurakōkōmae No. 1 railroad crossing is a popular tourist attraction for fans of Slam Dunk

Slam Dunk is often considered as one of the most influential manga series in Japan and one of the greatest sports manga series of all time. Its success is cited as a cause for the increased popularity of basketball among the Japanese youth during the 1990s. Alex Wong of Yahoo! Sports wrote that the work "inspired an entire generation of basketball players in Japan." In a dissertation, PhD student Dexter Thomas of Cornell University stated "The first wave of basketball in Japan was pushed forward by Slam Dunk." Professional basketball players Rui Hachimura and Yuta Watanabe have cited Slam Dunk as inspiring them. When he became a naturalized Japanese citizen, J. R. Sakuragi partially took his surname from the Hanamichi Sakuragi character.

Azusa Takahashi of the Japanese website Real Sound wrote that the appeal of Slam Dunk and the impact it had on the popularity of the sport is rooted in how realistic it is. It not only has flashy game scenes, but also includes scenes of steady practice. The Slam Dunk Scholarship program was created in 2006 by Inoue and Shueisha. The winning 17- to 18-year-old recipient receives a fully paid academic and athletic scholarship to a university-preparatory school in America if they pass the school's admission interview. Past recipients of the scholarship include Narito Namizato and Daichi Taniguchi. In 2010, Inoue received special commendations from the Japan Basketball Association for helping popularize basketball in Japan and the scholarship program. According to Wong, as of 2019, Slam Dunk "has never crossed into the mainstream in North America", and Viz editor Michael Montesa stated that in general manga related to sports have not sold as well in the United States.

The Kamakurakōkōmae No. 1 railroad crossing on the Enoshima Electric Railway has become a popular tourist attraction, or seichi junrei, for fans of Slam Dunk due to being depicted in the opening credits of the manga's anime adaptation. The resulting overtourism has caused the local government to assign security guards to the location in order to curb troublesome behavior. Many of the visitors are from foreign countries such as China and South Korea. In Taiwan, a replica of the crossing was created in the town of Taimali.
