= Tetsuo Hara =

Japanese manga artist (born 1961)

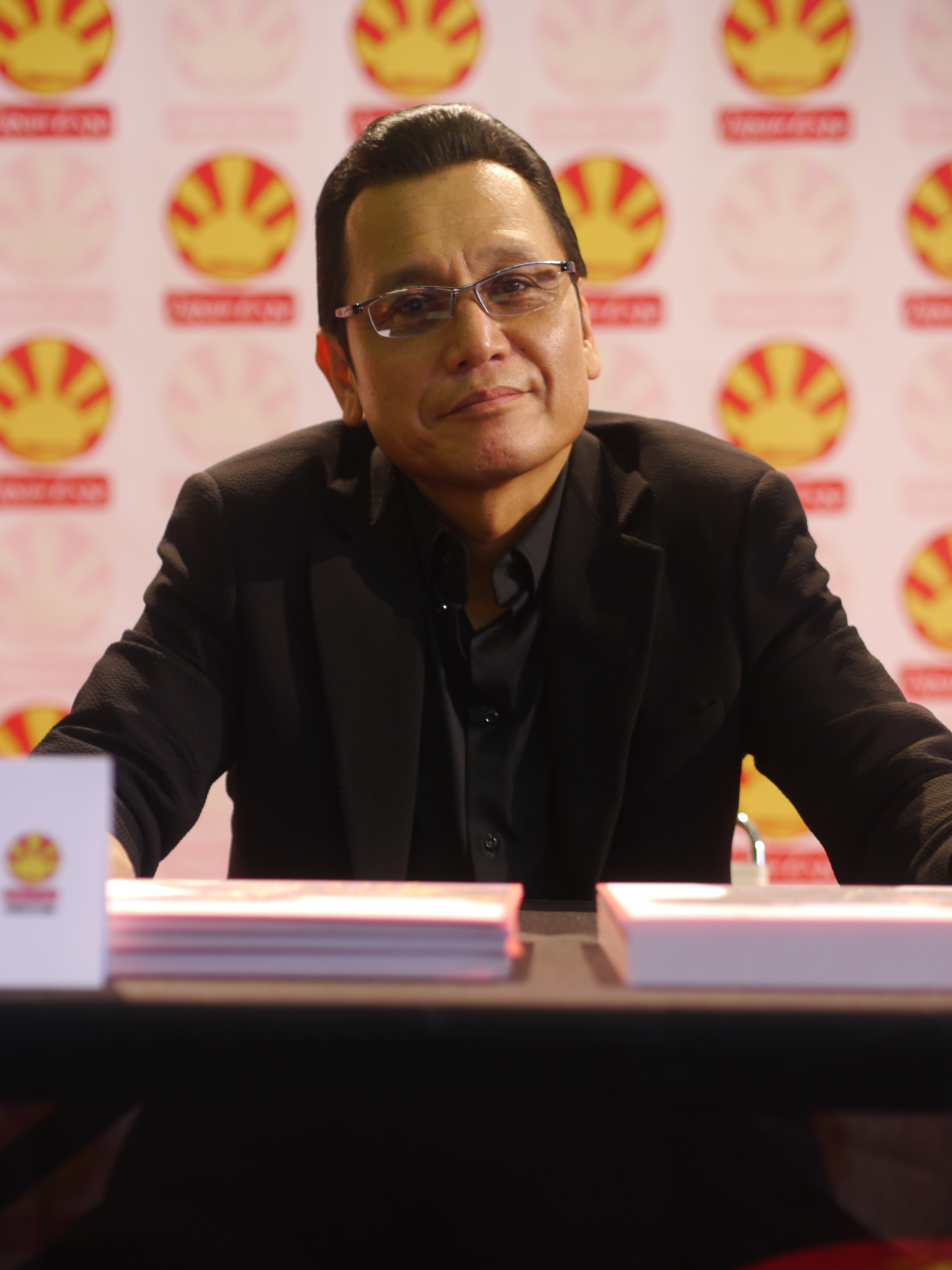
- Hara at Japan Expo 2013 in France
- Born: Hara Tetsuo (原哲夫); September 2, 1961 (age 65); Shibuya, Tokyo, Japan
- Occupation: Manga artist
- Years active: 1982–present
- Known for: Fist of the North Star; Fist of the Blue Sky; The Magnificent Bastard: The Legend of Keiji
- Website: Official website

Tetsuo Hara (Japanese: 原 哲夫, Hepburn: Hara Tetsuo; born September 2, 1961) is a Japanese manga artist. He is best known for co-creating the post-apocalyptic martial arts series Fist of the North Star (1983–1988) with writer Buronson, which is one of the best-selling manga in history with over 100 million copies in circulation.

== Early life ==
Although born in Tokyo, Hara lived in Matsubara-danchi in Sōka, Saitama. He is a cousin of comedian Ryo Fukawa. Hara began drawing characters from Osamu Tezuka's Astro Boy and Jungle Emperor Leo, as well as Ikki Kajiwara and Naoki Tsuji's Tiger Mask in first and second grade. In third and fourth grade he was obsessed with Shotaro Ishinomori's Kamen Rider manga, while the work of Fujio Akatsuka showed him how diverse the medium could be.

Hara had decided to become a manga artist by second and third grade. In middle school he read manga about becoming one, as well as autobiographical manga, and studied yonkoma to improve his sequencing. He then entered the design program at his high school, joined the "manga gekiga club," and submitted entries to manga competitions run by magazines. Hara also found inspiration by visiting the workplace of Osamu Akimoto, who was an alumnus of his high school.

== Career ==
When Hara approached Weekly Shōnen Jump about becoming a professional manga artist, editor Nobuhiko Horie liked his detailed artwork but noticed his poor story writing skills. Hara began working as an assistant to Yoshihiro Takahashi and enrolled in Gekiga Sonjuku, a manga school founded by Kazuo Koike, in 1981. He published several one-shots in 1982; "Mad Fighter" published in Fresh Jump in August, "Crash Hero" published in Weekly Shōnen Jump, and the boxing story "Super Challenger", which won first place at the 33rd Fresh Jump Prize. His first serialized work in Weekly Shōnen Jump was Iron Don Quixote, a motocross manga which lasted only ten weeks. Horie later claimed that the senior editor was willing to let Hara continue the series, but Horie chose to end it because he was confident the artist could do better. Hara then achieved fame with the publication of Fist of the North Star in 1983, which he co-created with Buronson. Ending in 1988, it spawned a massive franchise and went on to become one of the best-selling manga in history with over 100 million copies in circulation. His next long-running serial was The Magnificent Bastard: The Legend of Keiji, a period piece published in Weekly Shōnen Jump from 1990 to 1993 and loosely based on a novel by Keiichiro Ryu. It was through Kazuhiko Torishima that Hara received the offer from Capcom to create the character designs for the 1993 video game Saturday Night Slam Masters. In 1998, Hara reunited with Horie, whom he had not worked with since Fist of the North Star, to create Kōkenryoku Ōryō Sōsakan Nakabō Rintarō. The artist stated that the editor-in-chief at Shueisha had warned him to stay away from Horie because he held "no status" at the company. Hara was bewildered as to what office politics had to do with creating manga, and he and Horie both left Shueisha after Kōkenryoku Ōryō Sōsakan Nakabō Rintarō ended in 2000.

Hara, Horie and others then founded the publishing company Coamix that same year, and launched the manga magazine Weekly Comic Bunch in 2001. Hara serialized Fist of the Blue Sky, a prequel to Fist of the North Star, in Weekly Comic Bunch from 2001 until the magazine's final issue in 2010. Originally published weekly, the manga changed to a semi-regular schedule after Hara was diagnosed with keratoconus. Despite previously announcing his intentions to retire after completing Fist of the Blue Sky, Hara went on to create Ikusa no Ko: The Legend of Nobunaga Oda, written by Seibo Kitahara and published in Monthly Comic Zenon from 2010 to 2022. An English edition of Ikusa no Ko was concurrently published on the official Silent Manga Audition Community website. In 2021, Hara said that rather than creating work on his own, he was more interested in working with younger artists to create works as a team and pass on his forty years of experience.

== Influences ==
Hara has cited Fujio Akatsuka, Shotaro Ishinomori, Tetsuya Chiba, and Ryoichi Ikegami as some of his influences. The comedy in Akatsuk'a work showed him the "power" of manga and how fun it can be. Ishinomori's designs for heroes and monsters instilled in Hara to never get lazy with character designs, even for those that are killed off quickly. Chiba's work taught him that as long as the characters are interesting, they can move and progress the story on their own. Hara said that Ikegami had the biggest impact on his art, as the "realism and luster" in his characters show the "power" of gekiga. Hara has also cited Katsuhiro Otomo and Ai to Makoto as influences.

Hara admits that from the very beginning of his career, he has never been good at creating the stories of manga. Instead he focuses on showcasing his art skills and creating characters. He credits his first editor, Nobuhiko Horie, for continuing to work with him his whole career and "helping to fill in for my weaknesses and further develop my strengths." He described the process as starting with Horie proposing a storyline, while Hara focuses on the characters and art direction and creates the storyboard. Hara then instructs his staff to help with the final product, describing the entire process as relying on "the strengths of each person to create something greater than the sum of its parts." For Fist of the North Star specifically, Hara revealed that he and Buronson did not see each other much and never had meetings directly about work. Instead, Horie acted as go-between for the two.

== Works ==
=== Manga ===
==== Serials ====
Title	Co-creator(s)	Magazine	Date	Volumes
Iron Don Quijote (鉄のドンキホーテ, Tetsu no Don Kihōte)		Weekly Shōnen Jump	1982–1983	2
Fist of the North Star (北斗の拳, Hokuto no Ken)	Written by Buronson	Weekly Shōnen Jump	1983–1988	27
Cyber Blue (CYBERブルー)	Written by Bob, screenplay by Ryuichi Mitsui	Weekly Shōnen Jump	1988–1989	4
The Magnificent Bastard: The Legend of Keiji (花の慶次 －雲のかなたに－, Hana no Keiji -Kumo no Kanata ni-; "Flowery Keiji: At the Other Side of the Cloud")	Written by Keiichiro Ryu	Weekly Shōnen Jump	1990–1993	18
Kagemusha Tokugawa Ieyasu (影武者徳川家康; "Tokugawa Ieyasu's Shadow Warrior")	Written by Keiichiro Ryu, script by Shō Aikawa	Weekly Shōnen Jump	1994–1995	6
Takeki Ryūsei (猛き龍星; "The Mighty Ryusei")		Weekly Shōnen Jump	1995	3
Sakon - Sengoku Fūunroku- (SAKON －戦国風雲録－; "Sakon: Chronicles of Feudal Turbulence")	Written by Keiichiro Ryu, screenplay by Shingo Futahashi	Monthly Shōnen Jump	1997–2000	6
Hydra (九頭龍(ヒュドラ), Hyudora)	Written by Tadashi Ikuta	Manga Allman	1997–1998	1
Kōkenryoku Ōryō Sōsakan Nakabō Rintarō (公権力横領捜査官 中坊林太郎; "Government Corruption Investigator Rintaro Nakabo)	Supervised by Makoto Sataka	Bart 3230	1998–2000	2
Aterui the Second (阿弖流為(アテルイ)II世, Aterui Nisei)	Written by Katsuhiko Takahashi	Monthly Gotta	2000	1
Fist of the Blue Sky (蒼天の拳, Sōten no Ken)	Supervised by Buronson	Weekly Comic Bunch	2001–2010	22
Ikusa no Ko: The Legend of Oda Nobunaga (いくさの子 織田三郎信長伝, Ikusa no Ko: Oda Saburō Nobunaga Den)	Written by Seibo Kitahara	Monthly Comic Zenon	2010–2022	20

==== One-shots ====
Title	Co-creator(s)	Magazine	Date
Super Challenger (スーパーチャレンジャー)		Weekly Jump: Special Edition	1982/4/10
Mad Fighter (マッドファイター)		Fresh Jump	1982/08
Crash Hero (クラッシュヒーロー)	Original concept by Tetsuyuki Akuzawa	Weekly Jump	1982 (No. 43)
Hokuto no Ken (北斗の拳) (prototype version)		Fresh Jump	1983/04
Hokuto no Ken II (北斗の拳II) (prototype version)		Fresh Jump	1983/06
Zhí Yè Xiōng Shǒu (職業兇手(ジー イェ ション ショウ), Jī Ie Shon Shō)	Written by Arimasa Osawa	Weekly Jump	1993 (No. 5-6)
Kaen no Shō (火焔の掌; "The Hands of Flames")		Weekly Jump Spring Special	1995
Kiseki Moyuru Toki (輝石燃ゆる時; "When The Pyroxene Burns")		Weekly Jump	1996 (No. 43)
Chase (追撃(チェイス), Cheisu)	Written by Buronson	Manga Allman	1997 (No. 2)
Hokuto no Ken: Last Piece (北斗の拳 −LAST PIECE−)	Written by Buronson	Comic Zenon	May 2013 (Part 1); June 2013 (Part 2)

=== Novel illustrations ===
- Kōryū no Mimi - (2 volumes, 1991–1993)
- Ichimu An Fūryū Ki (1 volume, 1992 Shueisha Bunko edition)
- Hokuto no Ken: Jubaku no Machi (1 volume, 1995)
- Miyamoto Musashi (8 volumes, 2013 Takarashimasha Bunko edition)

=== Other works ===
- Saturday Night Slam Masters/Muscle Bomber (1993 arcade game) - promotional illustrations. The character portraits in the arcade version were done by another artist, but they were replaced by Hara's own renditions in the console versions for the Super NES and Sega Genesis.
- Muscle Bomber Duo (1993 arcade game) - promotional illustrations
- Ring of Destruction: Slam Masters II/Super Muscle Bomber (1994 arcade game) - promotional and in-game illustrations.
- Itadaki Muscle! (2006 TV series) - illustrations for the opening intro.
- Mori no Senshi Bonolon (2006 anime series) - producer, character designer
- Gifū Dōdō!! Naoe Kanetsugu -Maeda Keiji Tsuki-gatari- (2008–2010 manga series) - co-author with Nobuhiko Horie, illustrated by Yuji Takemura
- Thank You for the Music! (2010 album by Ryo Fukawa) - back cover illustration
- Gifū Dōdō!! Naoe Kanetsugu -Maeda Keiji Sake-gatari- (2010–2014 manga series) - co-author with Nobuhiko Horie, illustrated by Yuji Takemura
- Gifū Dōdō!! Hayate no Gunshi -Kuroda Kanbee- (2013–2017 manga series) - co-author with Nobuhiko Horie, illustrated by Toshiaki Yamada
- Gifū Dōdō!! Naoe Kanetsugu -Maeda Keiji Hana-gatari- (2014–2018 manga series) - co-author with Nobuhiko Horie, illustrated by Masato Deguchi
- Maeda Keiji Kabuki Tabi (2019–present manga series) - co-author with Nobuhiko Horie, illustrated by Masato Deguchi
- Pokémon Trading Card Game (2024, 2026 card game) - illustrated the Palafin EX (イルカマンex) and Maxie's Passion (マキシの熱血) cards
