= Comic Bunch =

Japanese manga magazine

- The final issue of Weekly Comic Bunch, showcasing many of the titles that were being published at the time.
- Categories: Seinen manga
- Frequency: Weekly (2001–2010); Monthly (2011–2024)
- Circulation: 140,000 (2010)
- Publisher: Shinchosha
- First issue: May 15, 2001
- Final issue: March 21, 2024
- Company: Shinchosha; Coamix (2001–2010)
- Country: Japan
- Language: Japanese
- Website: Official website

Comic Bunch (コミックバンチ, Komikku Banchi) (Note: Known as Weekly Comic Bunch (週刊コミックバンチ, Shūkan Komikku Banchi) from 2001 to 2010 and Monthly Comic Bunch (月刊コミック@バンチ, Gekkan Komikku Banchi) from 2011 to 2024.) was a Japanese seinen manga anthology edited by Coamix and published by Shinchosha, with a weekly schedule from 2001 to 2010, and a monthly schedule from 2011 to 2024. The collected editions of their titles were published under the Bunch Comics imprint.

== History ==
In 2000, Nobuhiko Horie, former editor-in-chief of Weekly Shōnen Jump, along with former Jump authors who worked under Horie such as Tetsuo Hara and Tsukasa Hojo, founded the manga editing company Coamix, with Shinchōsha acting as their business partner. The premiere issue of Coamix's Comic Bunch was published on May 15, 2001 (but dated May 29 on the cover). Prior to the publication of the actual first issue, Coamix released a free preview issue featuring illustrations and interviews with various artists. The magazine was originally published on Tuesday, but was changed to Friday from 2002 and onward.

In 2010, Shinchosha ceased publication of Weekly Comic Bunch with its September 10 issue (published on August 27). On the day of the final issue's publication, Shinchosha relaunched the official Comic Bunch website, announcing their plans to revive the magazine as a monthly publication titled Monthly Comic Bunch which later began publication on January 21, 2011. Coamix began publishing an unrelated manga anthology titled Monthly Comic Zenon, which debuted on October 25, 2010.

In March 2024, Monthly Comic Bunch ceased physical publication and was rebranded into the newly formed Comic Bunch Kai web magazine which will launch on April 26.

== List of works ==
=== Weekly Comic Bunch (2001–2010) ===
- Angel Heart by Tsukasa Hojo (2001–2010)
- Gau Gau Wāta by Umekawa Kazumi (2001–2004, continued in Comic Rex)
- Nemuri Kyoshirō by Yoshihiro Yanagawa (2001–2003)
- Fist of the Blue Sky by Tetsuo Hara (2001–2010)
- Tsūkai!! My Home by Satoshi Ikezawa (2001)
- Brave Story by Yoichiro Ono (2003–2008)
- Concierge by Hideyuki Ishizeki (2003–2010)
- The President of Japan: Sakurazaka Mantarō by Yoshiki Hidaka (2003–2006)
- Akihabara@Deep by Makoto Akane (2005–2007)
- Shin Violence Jack by Go Nagai (2005–2008)
- Attack by Tsukasa Oshima (2006–2010)
- 51 Ways to Save Her by Usamaru Furuya (2006–2007)
- Gu-Ra-Me! - Daisaishō no Ryōrinin written by Mitsuru Nishimura and drawn by Mitsuru Ohsaki (2006–2010)
- My Girl by Mizu Sahara (2006–2010)
- Ten no Haō - Hokuto no Ken Raō Gaiden by Yowkow Osada (2006–2007)
- Shirogane no Seija - Hokuto no Ken Toki Gaiden by Yuka Nagate (2007–2008)
- Sōkoku no Garō - Hokuto no Ken Rei Gaiden by Yasuyuki Nekoi (2007–2009)
- Btooom! by Jun'ya Inoue (2009–2018)
- Gokuaku no Hana - Hokuto no Ken Jagi Gaiden by Sin-ichi Hiromoto (2009)
- Miquiztli II - Taiyō no Shinigami by Kōji Maki (2009–2010)
- No Longer Human by Usamaru Furuya (2009–2010)
- Hōkō no Kumo - Hokuto no Ken Jūza Gaiden by Missile Kakurai (2010)

=== Monthly Comic Bunch (2011–2024) ===
- Gunka no Baltzar (2011–2022) (transferred to Kodansha's Bessatsu Shōnen Magazine)
- Papa and Daddy's Home Cooking (2014–2020)
- Artiste (2016–2024)
- Lunatic Circus by Usamaru Furuya (2020–2024) (transferred to Comic Bunch Kai)
- Tosho Lin Kai by Usamaru Furuya (2021–2022)
- Dinosaur Sanctuary by Itaru Kinoshita (2021–2024) (transferred to Comic Bunch Kai)
- Moeyo Ken by Ryōtarō Shiba, Emeru Komatsu and Yoshiki Kanata (2021–2024) (transferred to Comic Bunch Kai)
