= List of City Hunter 3 episodes =

- Season 3
- No. of episodes: 13

Release
- Original network: Yomiuri Television
- Original release: October 15, 1989 – January 21, 1990

Season chronology
- ← Previous; City Hunter 2 Next → City Hunter '91

City Hunter (Japanese: シティーハンター, Hepburn: Shitī Hantā) is a Japanese manga series written and illustrated by Tsukasa Hojo. The series was adapted into an anime series produced by Sunrise and broadcast by Yomiuri Television.

City Hunter 3 was broadcast for 13 episodes from October 15, 1989, to January 21, 1990. The opening theme for the series was "Running to Horizon" by Tetsuya Komuro and the ending theme was "Atsuku Naretara" by Kiyomi Suzuki.

It was later released on 6 VHS between November 1990 and April 1991. A thirty-two disc DVD box set City Hunter Complete published by Aniplex was released in Japan on August 31, 2005. The set contained all four series, the TV specials and animated movies as well as an art book and figures of Ryo and Kaori. The City Hunter 3 discs from the set were released individually on July 23, 2008.

ADV Films released the series in North America. City Hunter 3 was released as a single box set on December 2, 2003.

== Episode list ==
No.	Title	Original release date
1	"De-Mokkori Declaration: XYZ Saves The World" (Japanese: 脱モッコリ宣言! XYZは世界を救う)	15 October 1989
2	"The Greatest Flagrant Love Committed: How to Hit on a Beautiful Lawyer" (Japanese: 天下の恋愛現行犯! 美人弁護士をくどく法)	22 October 1989
3	"Even Kaori's Pissed: Ryo and a Young Lady, Pinch Hitter Marriage Story" (Japanese: 香もプッツン! 獠と令嬢"代打結婚物語")	29 October 1989
4	"Dangerous Detective Game: A Python for the Lady: Part 1" (Japanese: 危ない探偵ごっこ! お嬢さんにパイソンを（前編）)	5 November 1989
5	"Dangerous Detective Game: A Python for the Lady: Part 2" (Japanese: 危ない探偵ごっこ! お嬢さんにパイソンを（後編）)	12 November 1989
6	"Stubborn Umibouzu: Tale of the jealous kitten" (Japanese: がんこな海坊主! ジェラシー子猫物語)	19 November 1989
7	"Love is Diving: When a Beauty puts on a Swimsuit" (Japanese: 恋はダイビング! 美女が水着に着がえたら)	26 November 1989
8	"Who is Ryo? Even the College Girl is Smitten with the Thrill" (Japanese: 獠って何者? 女子大生もスリルにメロメロ)	3 December 1989
9	"Love Forecast of Rain then Shine: The Beautiful Newscaster's Umbrella of Love" (Japanese: 雨のち晴の恋予報! 美人キャスターに愛の傘)	10 December 1989
10	"A wedding dress for Christmas: Part 1" (Japanese: クリスマスにウェディングドレスを...（前編）)	17 December 1989
11	"A wedding dress for Christmas: Part 2" (Japanese: クリスマスにウェディングドレスを...（後編）)	24 December 1989
12	"Goodbye City, a Farewell Gift: Part 1" (Japanese: グッバイCITYさよならの贈りもの（前編）)	14 January 1990
13	"Goodbye City, a Farewell Gift: Part 2" (Japanese: グッバイCITYさよならの贈りもの（後編）)	21 January 1990
