= List of City Hunter 2 episodes =

- Season 2
- No. of episodes: 63

Release
- Original network: NNS (YTV, NTV)
- Original release: April 8, 1988 – July 14, 1989

Season chronology
- ← Previous; City Hunter Next → City Hunter 3

City Hunter (Japanese: シティーハンター, Hepburn: Shitī Hantā) is a Japanese manga series written and illustrated by Tsukasa Hojo. The series was adapted into an anime series produced by Sunrise, directed by Kenji Kodama and broadcast by Yomiuri Television. City Hunter 2 was broadcast for 63 episodes between April 8 and July 14. It was released on 10 VHS between August 1988 and March 1990. The opening themes were "Angel Night" by Psy-S for the first 26 episodes and "Sara" by Fence of Defence for the remaining episodes. The ending themes were "Super Girl" by Yasuyuki Okamura for the first 37 episodes and "Still Love Her" by TM Network for the remaining episodes.

A Thirty-Two disc DVD boxset City Hunter Complete published by Aniplex was released in Japan on August 31, 2005. The set contained all four series, the TV specials and animated movies as well as an art book and figures of Ryo and Kaori. City Hunter 2 was then released on 11 individual discs between March 26 and June 25, 2008.

ADV Films released the series on DVD in North America. City Hunter 2 was released as two boxsets of five discs on October 28 and November 18, 2003.

== Episode list ==
No.	Title	Original release date
1	"Ryo's her Future Husband? Her Horoscope says she will meet and marry him!: Part 1" (Japanese: 獠は許嫁!? 出会って恋して占います!（前編）)	8 April 1988
2	"Ryo's her Future Husband? Her Horoscope says she will meet and marry him!: Part 2" (Japanese: 獠は許嫁!? 出会って恋して占います!（後編）)	15 April 1988
3	"Kaori in Danger: Love Means Saying Goodbye: Part 1" (Japanese: 狙われた香!! 愛の言葉はさようなら（前編）)	22 April 1988
4	"Kaori in Danger: Love Means Saying Goodbye: Part 2" (Japanese: 狙われた香!! 愛の言葉はさようなら（後編）)	29 April 1988
5	"A Mischievous Mokkori Detective: A Beautiful Writer's Mystery Game" (Japanese: モッコリ迷探偵!? 美人作家の推理ゲーム)	6 May 1988
6	"Ryo's a Nude Model: The Beautiful Artist who stole a Masterpiece" (Japanese: 獠がヌードモデル!? 名画を盗んだ美人画家)	13 May 1988
7	"Tropical Island Assignment: The Coconut Girl's Love Paradise" (Japanese: 南の島からの依頼ココナツ娘と愛の楽園)	20 May 1988
8	"A Dangerous Detective before you know it: Welcome to Tokyo, Father" (Japanese: 気がつけば危ない刑事（デカ）東京だよお父つぁん!)	27 May 1988
9	"Moving Violation in Love: Ryo and the beautiful Motorcycle Cop." (Japanese: 恋の速度（スピード）違反! 白バイ美人と手錠で交際)	3 June 1988
10	"Mokkori Killer: The Princess's Noble Aura: Part 1" (Japanese: モッコリ殺し!? 王女の高貴なオーラ（前編）)	10 June 1988
11	"Mokkori Killer: The Princess's Noble Aura: Part 2" (Japanese: モッコリ殺し!? 王女の高貴なオーラ（後編）)	17 June 1988
12	"Must be the bloody battle outside the ring: Love, Cobra Twist" (Japanese: 場外乱闘流血必至!! 恋のコブラツイスト)	24 June 1988
13	"The most Advanced Smuggling Manouever: Treatment by a Beautiful Dentist" (Japanese: 最新密輸工作!! 美人歯科医の愛情治療)	1 July 1988
14	"Love can be superior to money: Mokkori vs a Saving Girl" (Japanese: 愛はお金を超えるか? モッコリ対貯金娘)	8 July 1988
15	"Don't Die, Falcon: Magnum with Love and Revenge: Part 1" (Japanese: 死ぬな!海坊主!! 愛と復讐のマグナム（前編）)	15 July 1988
16	"Don't Die, Falcon: Magnum with Love and Revenge: Part 2" (Japanese: 死ぬな!海坊主!! 愛と復讐のマグナム（後編）)	22 July 1988
17	"The Applicant Wants to be a Traditional Japanese Woman: Mokkori can overcome National Boundaries: Part 1" (Japanese: 大和撫子志願!? モッコリは国境を越えて（前編）)	29 July 1988
18	"The Applicant Wants to be a Traditional Japanese Woman: Mokkori can overcome National Boundaries: Part 2" (Japanese: 大和撫子志願!? モッコリは国境を越えて（後編）)	5 August 1988
19	"Kaori Takes a Great Active Role: Cheers with the Memorial Wine" (Japanese: 香ちゃん大活躍!! 思い出のワインで乾杯)	12 August 1988
20	"Kaori Gets Amnesia: Goodbye, my lovely partner" (Japanese: 香が記憶喪失!! さらば愛しきパートナー)	19 August 1988
21	"Aim for the Gold Medal: Intimate Training for the Shooting Beauty" (Japanese: めざせ金メダル!! 射撃美人に密着指導)	26 August 1988
22	"The Target is Ryo: The Camerawoman Loves Danger: Part 1" (Japanese: 標的（ターゲット）は獠! 激写美人（フォーカスレディ）は危険が大好き!（前編）)	9 September 1988
23	"The Target is Ryo: The Camerawoman Loves Danger: Part 2" (Japanese: 標的（ターゲット）は獠! 激写美人（フォーカスレディ）は危険が大好き!（後編）)	9 September 1988
24	"The Final Weapon, Sexy Sigh: A Female Ninja Enters The Big City" (Japanese: 必殺桃色吐息!? 大都会くの一進出物語)	16 September 1988
25	"Targeted Witness: A Dangerous Beauty dressed up like a man: Part 1" (Japanese: 狙われた証人! 男装美女と危険な二人（前編）)	30 September 1988
26	"Targeted Witness: A Dangerous Beauty dressed up like a man: Part 2" (Japanese: 狙われた証人! 男装美女と危険な二人（後編）)	7 October 1988
27	"Message from Makimura: Memories Forever: Part 1" (Japanese: 槇村からのメッセージ想い出は永遠に（前編）)	14 October 1988
28	"Message from Makimura: Memories Forever: Part 2" (Japanese: 槇村からのメッセージ想い出は永遠に（後編）)	21 October 1988
29	"Wounded Innocence: A Bullet and an Angel's Prayer" (Japanese: 傷だらけの純情! 鉄砲玉に天使の祈り)	28 October 1988
30	"Ryo, Please Be Deceived: Present to a girl from Saeko" (Japanese: 獠だまされてね! 少女に冴子の贈り物)	4 November 1988
31	"So Long, My Friend: The last shot echoing from my heart: Part 1" (Japanese: さらば友よ…心にひびく最期の銃声（ラスト・ショット）（前編)	11 November 1988
32	"So Long, My Friend: The last shot echoing from my heart: Part 2" (Japanese: さらば友よ…心にひびく最期の銃声（ラスト・ショット）（後編）)	18 November 1988
33	"Mokkori Contract: The Story of Ryo and a Bad Girl: Part 1" (Japanese: モッコリ契約成立! 獠と不良娘の珍道中（前編）)	25 November 1988
34	"Mokkori Contract: The Story of Ryo and a Bad Girl: Part 2" (Japanese: モッコリ契約成立! 獠と不良娘の珍道中（後編）)	2 December 1988
35	"Ryo is an Instructor: Extreme Mokkori Tactics" (Japanese: 獠はインストラクター究極のモッコリ戦法)	9 December 1988
36	"Ryo is a Gourmet: Nice PR for the Soba Noodle Beauty" (Japanese: 獠は美味しんぼ! そば打ち美人に粋なPR)	16 December 1988
37	"To Kaori From Ryo, With Love At Christmas: Part 1" (Japanese: 獠が香に…クリスマスに愛をこめて（前編）)	23 December 1988
38	"To Kaori From Ryo, With Love At Christmas: Part 2" (Japanese: 獠が香に…クリスマスに愛をこめて（後編）)	30 December 1988
39	"Umi-Chan, what a Sexy Guy: Beautiful Sweeper Miki gets close: Part 1" (Japanese: 海ちゃん色男! 美人スイーパー美樹が肉迫（前編）)	20 January 1989
40	"Umi-Chan, what a Sexy Guy: Beautiful Sweeper Miki gets close: Part 2" (海ちゃん色男! 美人スイーパー美樹が肉迫（後編）)	27 January 1989
41	"Mokkori Everywhere: Ryo's Mind and an Esper Girl: Part 1" (Japanese: モッコリだらけ! 獠の心と超能力（エスパー）少女（前編）)	3 February 1989
42	"Mokkori Everywhere: Ryo's Mind and an Esper Girl: Part 2" (Japanese: モッコリだらけ! 獠の心と超能力（エスパー）少女（後編）)	10 February 1989
43	"Ryo is the Love Thief: Hidden Love Affair behind the Magic Mirror: Part 1" (獠は恋泥棒! 魔鏡に秘めた愛の行方（前編）)	17 February 1989
44	"Ryo is the Love Thief: Hidden Love Affair behind the Magic Mirror: Part 2" (Japanese: 獠は恋泥棒! 魔鏡に秘めた愛の行方（後編）)	24 February 1989
45	"Nineteen Year-Old Widow: Lover in the Heart of a Beautiful Sketch Artist: Part 1" (Japanese: 19歳の未亡人! スケッチ美人に心の恋人（前編）)	3 March 1989
46	"Nineteen Year-Old Widow: Lover in the Heart of a Beautiful Sketch Artist: Part 2" (Japanese: 19歳の未亡人! スケッチ美人に心の恋人（後編）)	10 March 1989
47	"Wanting to fall in love like a Dream: The Strategy of a 12-year-old Angel: Part 1" (Japanese: 夢みるように恋したい12歳天使の作戦（前編）)	17 March 1989
48	"Wanting to fall in love like a Dream: The Strategy of a 12-year-old Angel: Part 2" (Japanese: 夢みるように恋したい12歳天使の作戦（後編）)	24 March 1989
49	"Goodbye Hard-Boiled City: Part 1" (Japanese: さらばハードボイルド・シティー（前編）)	31 March 1989
50	"Goodbye Hard-Boiled City: Part 2" (Japanese: さらばハードボイルド・シティー（後編）)	7 April 1989
51	"Crystal Prophecy: Chains of Memory Reviving in Kaori" (Japanese: 水晶の予言! 香によみがえる記憶の鎖)	14 April 1989
52	"Reunion after Twenty Years: Please look after my Sister, Mr. Saeba: Part 1" (Japanese: 20年目の再会! 冴羽さん妹をよろしく（前編）)	21 April 1989
53	"Reunion after Twenty Years: Please look after my Sister, Mr. Saeba: Part 2" (Japanese: 20年目の再会! 冴羽さん妹をよろしく（後編）)	28 April 1989
54	"Proposal from a 17-Year-Old Girl: Suspicious Date Panic: Part 1" (Japanese: 17歳のプロポーズ疑惑のデートパニック（前編）)	5 May 1989
55	"Proposal from a 17-Year-Old Girl: Suspicious Date Panic: Part 2" (Japanese: 17歳のプロポーズ疑惑のデートパニック（後編）)	12 May 1989
56	"Success Story in Shinjuku: The Neighbour is a beautiful dancer: Part 1" (Japanese: 新宿サクセス物語お隣さんは美人ダンサー（前編）)	19 May 1989
57	"Success Story in Shinjuku: The Neighbour is a beautiful dancer: Part 2" (Japanese: 新宿サクセス物語お隣さんは美人ダンサー（後編）)	26 May 1989
58	"Ryo Educates in a Spartan Way: A Bad Prince Raised in a Harem: Part 1" (Japanese: 獠のスパルタ教育! ハーレム育ちの悪ガキ王子（前編）)	2 June 1989
59	"Ryo Educates in a Spartan Way: A Bad Prince Raised in a Harem: Part 2" (Japanese: 獠のスパルタ教育! ハーレム育ちの悪ガキ王子（後編）)	9 June 1989
60	"Love is Magic: Ms. Magician with a Male Phobia" (Japanese: 恋は魔法ミスマジシャンは男性恐怖症)	23 June 1989
61	"Good Luck my Sweeper: City Streets for the both of us: Part 1" (Japanese: グッドラックマイスイーパー二人のシティストリート（前編）)	30 June 1989
62	"Good Luck my Sweeper: City Streets for the both of us: Part 2" (Japanese: グッドラックマイスイーパー二人のシティストリート（中編）)	7 July 1989
63	"Good Luck my Sweeper: City Streets for the both of us: Part 3" (Japanese: グッドラックマイスイーパー二人のシティストリート（後編）)	14 July 1989
