= Gwinko =

Japanese actress and singer

- Born: Gwinko Kanagushiku (金城 吟子); June 4, 1973 (age 53); Okinawa, Japan
- Other name: Ginko Mirai (美良樹 吟呼)
- Occupation: Singer
- Musical career
- Genres: J-pop; dance-pop; R&B; funk
- Instrument: Vocals
- Years active: 1987–1994; 2020–present
- Labels: CBS Sony; Media Remoras

Japanese name
- Hiragana: ぎんこ
- Katakana: ギンコ
Transcriptions
- Romanization: Ginko

Gwinko Kanagushiku (Okinawan: 金城 吟子, romanized: Kanagushiku Gwinko; born on June 4, 1973) is a Japanese singer who is currently a member of the duo Kina & Gwinko Worldchamploo.

== Biography ==
Gwinko was born in Okinawa. She was one of the first batch of students from the Okinawa Actors School. In 1986, she passed an audition hosted by CBS Sony and moved to Tokyo, becoming Okinawa Actors School's first graduate. Gwinko released her debut album Yesterday Today Forever and single "Star Ship (I'm Going High)" in 1987. She became known for her style of singing R&B with digital sound in the foreground with slightly husky and relaxed vocals, as well as her dance choreography reminiscent of that of Janet Jackson.

In 1988, Gwinko participated at CBS Sony's 20th anniversary event "New Blood 88–89". Later that year, she performed at Epic/Sony's 10th anniversary concert "Dance to Christmas". In the summer of 1989, Gwinko participated in the live tour "New Bloods Presents Funk a Hips Live Show" as a member of New Bloods. In October of that year, she became the co-host of the music program Hit Studio R&N alongside Ichiro Furutachi. On the October 13 episode, Gwinko and Furutachi were witnesses to an incident when rock band The Timers played an unscheduled performance of a song protesting FM Tokyo censorship policies.

In 1991, Gwinko released the single "Downtown Game", which was used as the opening theme of the anime series City Hunter '91. Shortly after the release of her album Tokyo Ukiuki Girl, she moved back to Okinawa. In 1994, Gwinko signed with Media Remoras and released her sixth album Princess Moon.

In 2020, Gwinko re-emerged from retirement and joined Shoukichi Kina to form Kina & Gwinko Worldchamploo.

== Discography ==
=== Studio albums ===
Year	Information	Oricon weekly peak position	Sales	RIAJ certification
1987	Yesterday Today Forever: Released: September 21, 1987; Label: CBS Sony; Formats: LP, CD, cassette	—		
1988	Teenage Beat: Released: June 1, 1988; Label: CBS Sony; Formats: LP, CD, cassette	—		
1989	Every Girl: Released: June 21, 1989; Label: CBS Sony; Formats: CD, cassette	—		
1990	I'm In: Released: July 21, 1990; Label: CBS Sony; Formats: CD, cassette	—		
1991	Tokyo Ukiuki Girl: Released: May 22, 1991; Label: Sony Records; Formats: CD, cassette	—		
1994	Princess Moon: Released: September 21, 1994; Label: Media Remoras; Formats: CD, cassette	—		
"—" denotes a release that did not chart.

=== Singles ===
List of singles, with selected chart positions
Title	Date	Peak chart positions	Sales (JPN)	RIAJ certification	Album
Title	Date	JPN Oricon	Sales (JPN)	RIAJ certification	Album
"Star Ship (I'm Going High)"	September 2, 1987	—			Non-album single
"Gwinko's Christmas Carol (Sweet Heart Version)"	November 21, 1987	—			Yesterday Today Forever
"Get On"	April 2, 1988	—			Teenage Beat
"Us"	January 21, 1990	—			Non-album single
"Yokubari na Weekend"	August 1, 1990	—			I'm In
"Downtown Game"	April 25, 1991	—			Tokyo Ukiuki Girl
"Bougainvillea wo Daite Waratte"	July 21, 1994	—			Princess Moon
"—" denotes a release that did not chart.

=== Other recordings ===
Release date	Work	Song	Notes
September 29, 1994	Samurai Shodown: The Motion Picture	"Daisuki to iu uso o tsuita"	Anime TV special ending theme.

== Filmography ==
=== TV ===
- Hit Studio R&N (1989–1990)

=== Film ===
- Tanpenshū Step Out (1990)
- Heartbreaker: Dangan yori Ai wo Komete (1992)
