= List of City Hunter episodes =

- Promotional Nippon Television poster featuring Kaori Makimura, Ryo Saeba, and Saeko Nogami
- No. of episodes: 51

Release
- Original network: NNS (YTV, NTV)
- Original release: April 6, 1987 – March 28, 1988

Season chronology
- Next → City Hunter 2

City Hunter (Japanese: シティーハンター, Hepburn: Shitī Hantā) is a Japanese manga series written and illustrated by Tsukasa Hojo. The series was adapted into an anime series produced by Sunrise, directed by Kenji Kodama and broadcast by Yomiuri TV, Nippon Television and their affiliates.

A total of 51 episodes aired from April 6, 1987, to March 28, 1988. "Ai yo Kienaide" by Kahoru Kohiruimaki was the opening theme for Episodes 1–26, while "Go Go Heaven" by Yoshiyuki Ohsawa was used for the remaining episodes. The ending theme for all 51 episodes was "Get Wild" by TM Network; "Get Wild" and a later 1989 remix sold a combined 515,010 singles in Japan.

The series was then released in Japan as ten VHS tapes by Victor from December 1987 to July 1988. A thirty-two disc DVD boxset City Hunter Complete published by Aniplex was released in Japan on August 31, 2005. The set contained all four series, the TV specials and animated movies as well as an art book and figures of Ryo and Kaori. The discs were then released individually, with the first series released on discs from December 19, 2007, to February 27, 2008.

The series was licensed by ADV Films for release in North America. The first City Hunter series was released on the ADV Fansubs label in March 2000. The aim of this label was to provide cheaper subtitled only VHS releases at a faster pace than usual. The series was scheduled for 13 tapes, consisting of four episodes each. The tapes could be ordered individually or as a subscription service. ADV later released the series on DVD. The first series was released as two boxsets of five discs on July 29, 2003.

== Episode list ==
No.	Title	Original release date
1	"One Cool Sweeper: XYZ is a Dangerous Cocktail"; Transliteration: "Ikina Suīpā XYZ wa Kiken'na Kakuteru" (Japanese: 粋なスイーパーXYZは危険なカクテル)	6 April 1987
A highschool girl gets shot with a silencer from a white BMW. Her big sister contracts Ryo.
2	"Please Kill Me: Crosshairs Don't Become a Pretty Girl"; Transliteration: "Watashi o Koroshite!! Bijo ni Shōjun wa Niawanai" (Japanese: 私を殺して!! 美女に照準は似合わない)	13 April 1987
A scientist dies: his beautiful daughter helped him develop a deadly bacteria. Arms dealers are after her.
3	"Love Don't Leave Me: A Ten Count to Tomorrow"; Transliteration: "Ai yo Kieinaide! Ashita e no Tenkaunto" (Japanese: 愛よ消えないで! 明日へのテンカウント)	20 April 1987
A boxer is shot in a park by a rival. His widow, a doctor with cancer, contracts Ryo.
4	"Lady Vanish: Boutique of the Shadows"; Transliteration: "Redī Banisshu!! Butikku wa Yami e no Sasoi" (Japanese: 美女蒸発(レディーバニッシュ)!! ブティックは闇への誘い)	27 April 1987
Beautiful girls disappear in shops, including Ryo's partner's little sister: Makimura Kaori.
5	"Goodbye Makimura: A Tearful Birthday on a Rainy Night"; Transliteration: "Gubbai Makimura Ame no Yoru ni Namida no Bāsudē" (Japanese: グッバイ槇村雨の夜に涙のバースデー)	4 May 1987
On Kaori's birthday, a drug cartel sends a hitman, the General, to erase Hideyuki Makimura. His younger sister Kaori becomes Ryo's partner.
6	"No Romance for this Actress: The Last Shot for Hope"; Transliteration: "Koi Shinai Joyū Kibō e no Rasuto Shotto" (Japanese: 恋しない女優希望へのラストショット)	11 May 1987
A lovelorn actress hires Umibozu to kill her, the producer hires Ryo to protect her.
7	"A Gunshot to set the Heart Aflutter: Sad Lonely Girl"; Transliteration: "Kokoro Furueru Jūsei Kanashiki Ronrīgāru" (Japanese: 心ふるえる銃声悲しきロンリーガール)	18 May 1987
A fall guy for the next minister asks Ryo to fake his death so he can see his daughter.
8	"A One-Hole-Shot to a Lovely: Hands Off My Lady Detective"; Transliteration: "Bijin ni Hyappatsu Wan Hōru Shotto?! On'na Keiji ni wa Te wo Dasuna" (Japanese: 美人に百発百中(ワンホールショット)?! 女刑事(デカ)には手を出すな)	25 May 1987
Nogami Saeko an inspector asks Ryo to help steal an artifact with secret documents.
9	"The Gambling Queen: A Bet for Wonderful Love"; Transliteration: "Gyanburukuin Kareinaru Koi no Kake" (Japanese: ギャンブルクィーン華麗なる恋の賭け)	1 June 1987
A genius croupier wants to leave her syndicate, Ryo assists her.
10	"One Dangerous Tutor: Home-Cooking from the Heart for a Sukeban"; Transliteration: "Kiken'na Kateikyōshi? Sukeban ni Ai no TeRyori" (Japanese: 危険な家庭教師?女子高生(スケバン)に愛の手料理)	8 June 1987
A yakuza boss tricks Ryo into protecting his daughter, herself a highschool gang leader.
11	"That Pretty Girl in Tights Prefers the Tulips"; Transliteration: "Reotādo Bijo wa Chūrippu ga o Suki" (Japanese: レオタード美女はチューリップがお好き)	15 June 1987
Highschool girl Phantom Thief #305 asks Ryo to steal the black tulip from a paranormal expert.
12	"Kids Get Special Treatment: A Beautiful Lady from a Dangerous Land"; Transliteration: "Kodomo wa Tokuda ne! Kiken'na Kuni no Mokkori Bijin" (Japanese: 子供は得だね! 危険な国のモッコリ美人)	22 June 1987
A revolutionary girl with a kid in tow contacts Ryo to save her from her local secret services.
13	"My Foe is A Beautiful Lady: The Biggest Woman Trap in History"; Transliteration: "Ore no Teki wa Bijo? Shijō Saidai no Bijo Jigoku!!" (Japanese: オレの敵は美女? 史上最大の美女地獄!!)	6 July 1987
Helping Saeko uncovering human traffic, Ryo goes into rapture over the beautiful boss.
14	"She's Getting Married At Age Sixteen: A Hot Kiss With A Pop Idol"; Transliteration: "16-sai Kekkon Sengen! Aidoru ni Atsui Kissu" (Japanese: 16歳結婚宣言! アイドルに熱いキッス)	29 June 1987
An idol, threatened by a deranged fan, hires Ryo as bodyguard but feelings develop.
15	"Ryo's an Instructor at a Women's School?: To Protect a Sweet Young Lady"; Transliteration: "Ryo ga Joshidai Kōshi? Uruwashi no Ojō-sama o Mamore" (Japanese: 獠が女子大講師? 麗しのお嬢サマを守れ)	13 July 1987
Ryo protects an adopted heiress from her mother. The girl was saved by a Ryo lookalike.
16	"One Frisky Stewardess: Ryo - Self Defense Instructor"; Transliteration: "Okyan Suchuwādesi Ryo no Kyōkan Monogatari☆" (Japanese: おきゃんスチュワーデス獠の教官物語☆)	20 July 1987
Chiemi, a stewardess friend of Kaori, has weapons smuggled into her luggage.
17	"Summer's Lovely Designer: Ryo has a Thing for the Super-High-Leg Type"; Transliteration: "Natsu no Bijin Dezainā Ryo no Kokoro wa Haireggu☆" (Japanese: 夏の美人デザイナー獠の心はハイレッグ☆)	27 July 1987
Oohara Midori got her swimsuit designs stolen by her declining mentor.
18	"A Divine Prophecy on a Summer's Evening: Shrine Maiden gets first lesson in love" Transliteration: "Natsu no Yo no Otsuge?! Kitō-shi ni Koi no Tehodoki☆" (Japanese: 夏の夜のお告げ?! 祈祷師に恋の手ほどき☆)	3 August 1987
A politician wants to silence a Shinto prophetess who knows too much.
19	"A Beach to Remember: An Audition full of Danger"; Transliteration: "Omoide no Nagida Ōdishon wa Kiken ga Ippai" (Japanese: 思い出の渚オーディションは危険がいっぱい)	10 August 1987
Ryo protects an audition with 20 candidates, one is interested in the director.
20	"Her Ladyship Leaves the Mountain: One Long Day for Ryo"; Transliteration: "Yama kara Hime ga Ori te Kuru Ryo no Naga〜Ichi Hi☆" (Japanese: 山から姫が降りてくる獠の長〜い一日☆)	17 August 1987
A Heike princess comes to visit the capital, and is followed by trouble.
21	"Faceless Snipers: Ryo's and Saeko's Dangerous Game"; Transliteration: "Sugata Naki Sogeki-sha!! Ryo to Saeko no Kiken'na Gēmu" (Japanese: 姿なき狙撃者!! 獠と冴子の危険なゲーム)	24 August 1987
Saeko's friend with a fatal disease stake his life on a game of assassins vs bodyguards.
22	"Ryo Plays Cupid: Here's to Diamonds"; Transliteration: "Ryo no Kyūpitto Daimando ni Kanpai!!" (Japanese: 愛のキューピットダイヤモンドに乾杯!!)	31 August 1987
Ryo helps a diamond thief who stole it from her former fiancé.
23	"Buzz Buzz Buzz go the Killer Bees: A Bride Fallen from the Sky"; Transliteration: "Doku Bachibunbun!! Sora kara Hanayome Futte kita" (Japanese: 毒バチブンブン!! 空から花嫁降ってきた)	7 September 1987
A girl poses as a bride to steal modified bees developed by her late lover.
24	"A Rosy Hospital Stay?: An Angel in White in Danger"; Transliteration: "Bara-iro no Nyūin Seikatsu? Nera wareta Hakui no Tenshi" (Japanese: バラ色の入院生活? 狙われた白衣の天使)	14 September 1987
An old rich man wants to give his fortune to a clumsy nurse.
25	"An International Relationship of Love: My Counterpart is a Blonde Beauty"; Transliteration: "Ai no Kokusai Shinzen?! Raibaru wa Burondo Bijin" (Japanese: 愛の国際親善?! ライバルはブロンド美人)	21 September 1987
A blond foreign spy with a computer as a partner is after a distribution channel of tanks.
26	"What is Love?: Ryo's course in Proper Romance"; Transliteration: "Aitte Nan desu ka? Ryo no Tadashī Ren'ai Kōza" (Japanese: 愛ってなんですか? 獠の正しい恋愛講座)	28 September 1987
An over-protected daughter finds a job in a fast food. Ryo is to stop suspicious types to approach her.
27	"Ryo & Umibozu's Sweet Daddy Longlegs Story: Episode 1"; Transliteration: "Ryo to Umibōzu no Junjō Ashi na ga Ojisan Densetsu (Zenpen)" (Japanese: 獠と海坊主の純情足ながおじさん伝説（前編）)	5 October 1987
Umibozu secretly took care of a friend's daughter. Wanting to meet, he asks Ryo to impersonate him.
28	"Ryo & Umibozu's Sweet Daddy Longlegs Story: Episode 2"; Transliteration: "Ryo to Umibōzu no Junjō Ashi na ga Ojisan Densetsu (Kōhen)" (Japanese: 獠と海坊主の純情足ながおじさん伝説（後編）)	12 October 1987
A traitor from Umibozu's squad, Snake, wants to take revenge on the daughter.
29	"A 500 Yen Job: A Cute Little Girl wins Ryo's Heart"; Transliteration: "Irai Ryo wa 500-en!? Meruhen Bijin wa Ryo Konomi" (Japanese: 依頼料は500円!? メルヘン美人は獠好み)	19 October 1987
An artist of children books is harassed by her former editor. Her kid neighbour contacts Ryo.
30	"Ryo's Rival In Love: Give Me Kaori"; Transliteration: "Koi no Raibaru Shutsugen!? Kaori-san o Itadakimasu" (Japanese: 恋のライバル出現!? 香さんをいただきます)	26 October 1987
An aunt wants to kill her nephew because the uncle disappeared on a trip. Nephew gets infatuated with Kaori.
31	"Fast Paced Romance: A Girl's Love Closing in Fast"; Transliteration: "Baribari Rabu! Otome Kokoro o Kake Nukero!" (Japanese: バリバリラブ! 乙女心を駈けぬけろ!)	2 November 1987
A rich girl is in love with a biker gang member. They both contact XYZ for different purposes.
32	"Don't Die Ryo: Hard Boiled Magnum"; Transliteration: "Ryo Shina nai de!! Hādo Boirudo Magunamu" (Japanese: 獠死なないで!! ハードボイルドマグナム)	9 November 1987
Saeko asks Ryo to protect her, but a top-class assassin is after her. It's a challenge.
33	"Go For It Umibozu: One, Hard-Boiled First Love Concerto"; Transliteration: "Ganbare Umibōzu!! Hādo na Hatsukoi Kyōsōkyoku" (Japanese: がんばれ海坊主!! ハードな初恋協奏曲)	16 November 1987
Umibozu is in love with a pianist uncovering a corruption scandal.
34	"Shock! Ryo's a Papa: Don't Wake that Sleeping Child"; Transliteration: "Shōgeki!! Ryo no Chichioya Sengen Neteru Ko wa Okosu na" (Japanese: 衝撃!! 獠の父親宣言寝てる子は起こすな)	23 November 1987
A mother drops her child at Ryo's to ward off the grandfather dealing with the loss of his son.
35	"A Vision Newscaster: Ryo's Mokkori Report Scandal"; Transliteration: "Totsugeki Bijin Kyasutā Ryo no Maruhi Mokkori Shuzai" (Japanese: 突撃美人キャスター獠の㊙(まるひ)モッコリ取材)	30 November 1987
Ryo helps a famous caster investigating a scandal involving a politician and yakuza.
36	"A College Girl Plays Hardball for Love: Someone is trying to kill me." Transliteration: "Joshidai Nama Ai no Tsuppari! Dare ka ga Watashi o Neratteru" (Japanese: 女子大生愛のツッパリ! 誰かが私を狙ってる)	7 December 1987
A girl is considered suicidal, but she's targeted. Her stepfather is involved, but not in the way she thinks.
37	"Shinjuku Honor All The Way: The Kimono Beauty Wants to be my Student: Episode 1"; Transliteration: "Shinjuku Jingi Itchokusen! Kinagashi Bijin wa Deshi Shigan (Zenpen)" (Japanese: 新宿仁義一直線! 着流し美人は弟子志願（前編）)	14 December 1987
Ryo saves people and acquires the daughter of the Hanafubuki boss as a disciple.
38	"Shinjuku Honor All The Way: The Kimono Beauty Wants to be my Student: Episode 2"; Transliteration: "Shinjuku Jingu Itchokusen! Kinagashi Bijin wa Deshi Shigan (Kōhen)" (Japanese: 新宿仁義一直線! 着流し美人は弟子志願（後編）)	21 December 1987
The trouble maker from the Hanafubiki got expelled and now plots revenge against Ryo and the daughter.
39	"Princess from the Moon: Amnesia gives Ryo Headaches"; Transliteration: "Puttsun Kaguya Hime! Ryo mo Te o Yaku Kioku Sōshitsu" (Japanese: プッツンかぐや姫! 獠も手を焼く記憶喪失)	4 January 1988
Ryo takes care of a very wealthy, generous and amnesiac foreigner. Saeko lost a princess...
40	"One Sexy Partner: After Shower Compensation"; Transliteration: "Mokkori Pātonā! Irai-Ryo wa Shawā no Nochi de" (Japanese: もっこりパートナー! 依頼料はシャワーの後で)	11 January 1988
An insurance investigator partners with Ryo to find the Smile of Cleopatra before the policy kicks in.
41	"Saeko's Little Sister is a Private Eye: A Passionate Lady's Big Secret: Episode 1"; Transliteration: "Saeko no Imōto wa On'na Tantei (Zenpen) Tonda On'na no Daitan Himitsu" (Japanese: 冴子の妹は女探偵?（前編）翔んだ女の大胆秘密)	18 January 1988
Former cop Nogami Reika starts a PE business but her office is ravaged by mafia group she extorts.
42	"Saeko's Little Sister is a Private Eye: A Passionate Lady's Big Secret: Episode 2"; Transliteration: "Saeko no Imōto wa On'na Tantei (Kōhen) Tonda On'na no Daitan Himitsu" (Japanese: 冴子の妹は女探偵?（後編）翔んだ女の大捕物帳)	25 January 1988
The extorted money was for the widow of her dead partner, evidence points to a corrupt police officer.
43	"Utako's Cookie Anniversary: Moles on her chest and a Love Poem."; Transliteration: "Utako no Kukkī Kinenbi Mune Bokuro to Hatsukoi no Uta" (Japanese: 女心のクッキー記念日胸ボクロと初恋の唄)	1 February 1988
An orphan poetess is harassed by pervs. They try to find out if she's the granddaughter of their boss.
44	"We Asked 100 Kids: They Said 'Ryo's Our Hero'"; Transliteration: "Kodomo 100-hito ni Kikimashita!? Ryo wa Bokura no Hīrō da" (Japanese: 子供100人に聞きました!? 獠は僕らのヒーローだ)	8 February 1988
Ryo goes to a beautiful hairdresser, but her siblings discover stolen money in an abandoned building.
45	"Three Sisters Are Calling: Ryo's Skiing Heaven"; Transliteration: "San Shimai wa Maneku yo! Ryo-chan no Sukī Tengoku" (Japanese: 三姉妹は招くよ! 獠ちゃんのスキー天国)	15 February 1988
Ryo must protects three daughters in a chalet. Their capture could abort a fusion the father is doing.
46	"Picking Pockets is a Thrill: Pick Pockets for Tomorrow"; Transliteration: "Totte mo Suriringu Ashita ni Mukatte Sure!!" (Japanese: 盗ってもスリリング明日に向ってすれ!!)	22 February 1988
A friend of Kaori, Mariko wants to pick pockets. Ryo tries to discourage her and challenges her.
47	"Mokkori is the best Medicine: A Pool Shot to a Pretty Hustler's Heart"; Transliteration: "Mokkori ga Tokkōyaku!? Bijo Hasurā to Ai no Kyū Ato" (Japanese: モッコリが特効薬!? 美女ハスラーと愛の球跡)	29 February 1988
A daughter needs to play a pool match: her family club is at stake. Ryo ensures fairplay.
48	"O Spring Come Soon to Love's Widow: Take off those Clothes of Mourning"; Transliteration: "Haruyo Koi Koi Mibōjin! Sa~a Mofuku o Nui de…" (Japanese: 春よこい恋未亡人! さぁ喪服をぬいで…)	7 March 1988
A young widow is stuck in the past. A thief is after some diamonds that ended up in her husband's collection.
49	"Sister in Doubt: Mokkori is her guide to love" Transliteration: "Mayoeru Shisutā Mokkori wa Ai no o Michibiki!?" (Japanese: 迷えるシスターもっこりは愛のお導き!?)	14 March 1988
A sister hires Ryo to find her rosario. They have fun but in the end she pronounces her vows.
50	"The Deadliest Enemy: Ryo and Kaori's Final Match: Episode 1"; Transliteration: "Shijō Saikyō no Teki!! Ryo to Kaori no Rasuto Macchi (Zenpen)" (Japanese: 史上最強の敵!! 獠と香のラストマッチ（前編）)	21 March 1988
Remnants of the syndicate that killed Makimura are after Ryo, Kaori, Saeko, and Umibozu.
51	"The Deadliest Enemy: Ryo and Kaori's Final Match: Episode 2"; Transliteration: "Shijō Saikyō no Teki!! Ryo to Kaori no Rasuto Macchi (Kōhen)" (Japanese: 史上最強の敵!! 獠と香のラストマッチ（後編）)	28 March 1988
Kaori got kidnapped, so it's a showdown between Ryo and three killers on the syndicate's freighter.
