= List of City Hunter '91 episodes =

- Season '91
- No. of episodes: 13

Release
- Original network: Yomiuri Television
- Original release: April 28 – October 10, 1991

Season chronology
- ← Previous; City Hunter 3 Next → N/A

City Hunter (Japanese: シティーハンター, Hepburn: Shitī Hantā) is a Japanese manga series written and illustrated by Tsukasa Hojo. The series was adapted into an anime series produced by Sunrise and broadcast by Yomiuri Television.

City Hunter '91 was broadcast between April 28 and October 10, 1991. The opening theme was "Downtown Game" by Gwinko and the closing theme was "Smile & Smile" by Aura.

The series was released on 6 VHS between February and July 1992. A Thirty-Two disc DVD boxset City Hunter Complete published by Aniplex was released in Japan on August 31, 2005. The set contained all four series, the TV specials and animated movies as well as an art book and figures of Ryo and Kaori. The City Hunter '91 discs from this set were released individually on August 27, 2008.

City Hunter '91 was released in North America by ADV Films on December 16, 2003.

== Episode list ==
No.	Title	Original release date
1	"Big Revival of the Funny Pair! The Beauty Fallen from the Sky" (Japanese: 迷コンビ大復活！空から舞いおりた美女)	28 April 1991
2	"Farewell Kaori! Orders to capture City Hunter" (Japanese: さらば香！シティーハンター逮捕指令)	5 May 1991
3	"Combination of puzzlement & recovery! Memories are a distant light" (Japanese: 危険を買う美女！想い出は光の彼方に)	12 May 1991
4	"Love is also an A-license. The beautiful wheelman visiting the store!" (Japanese: 恋もA級ライセンス 美人逃がし屋参上！)	26 May 1991
5	"Fear! Shinjuku Ghost Story!! The Wandering Soul of a Beautiful Woman" (Japanese: 恐怖！新宿怪談！さまよえる美女の魂)	16 June 1991
6	"Farewell Requiem Your Visage, Once Again" (Japanese: 別れのレクイエム あの面影をもう一度)	30 June 1991
7	"That Hayato Ijuin's Extremely Peaceful Day" (Japanese: あの伊集院隼人氏の極めて平穏な一日)	21 July 1991
8	"Revenge of the beautiful woman! The sorrowful blues for Ryo" (Japanese: 復讐の美女！獠に哀しみのブルースを)	28 July 1991
9	"The Place Where Gun Smoke Goes. City Hunter Dies at Dawn" (Japanese: 硝煙の行方 シティーハンター暁に死す！)	4 August 1991
10	"My Love For Tonight Only Cinderella Story in the City" (Japanese: 今夜だけこの愛を⋯都会のシンデレラ物語)	22 September 1991
11	"A Trigger Covered with Scratches! The Detective Saeko Loved" (Japanese: 傷だらけのトリガー！冴子が愛した刑事)	10 October 1991
12	"Memories of the Necklace Incident Ryo, a Bad Girl & Makimura" (Japanese: 追憶の首飾り事件！獠と悪女と槙村と)	10 October 1991
13	"Lullaby requiem. The young nobleman who came from a distant country" (Japanese: 鎮魂のララバイ 遠い国から来た貴公子)	10 October 1991
