= List of Angel Heart chapters =

Cover art of the first volume of manga as re-released by Tokuma Shoten.

The chapters of Japanese manga Angel Heart are written and illustrated by Tsukasa Hojo.

The 1st season has been released in 2 editions, the first time edited by Bunch Comics simply under the title Angel Heart, the second time by Zenon Comics DX as Angel Heart: 1st Season.

== Volume list ==
=== Angel Heart ===
No.	Release date	ISBN
1	October 15, 2001	978-4-10-771001-7
1. Unmei ni Yureru Asashin (運命に揺れる暗殺者); 2. Zekkyō suru Yume no Kioku (絶叫する夢の記憶); 3. Ano Hito ni Aitakute (あの人に会いたくて); 4. Shinjuku de o Abare! (新宿で大暴れ！); 5. Omoide ni Michibika rete (思い出に導かれて); 6. Omoide to no Saikai (思い出との再会); 7. Dengonban e no Josō (伝言板への助走); 8. Deai to Iu na no Saikai (出会いという名の再会); 9. Shōgeki no Kaigō (衝撃の邂逅); 10. Kokoro to no Taiwa (こころとの対話)
2	December 15, 2001	978-4-10-771012-3
11. Jijitsu e no Kōyō (事実への昂揚); 12. Shōgeki o Koeta Shinjitsu (衝撃を超えた真実); 13. Kinpaku suru Shinjuku (緊迫する新宿); 14. Shōgeki no Furasshu Panaku (衝撃のフラッシュパナク); 15. Lǐ kyōdai to no Shukuun (李兄弟との宿運); 16. Shussei no Himitsu (出生の秘密); 17. Unmei no Taimen (運命の対面); 18. Gurasu · Hāto no Tokimeki (グラス· ハートのときめき); 19. Misuteriasu na Liáo (ミステリアスな獠); 20. Sensen Fukoku! ! (宣戦布告！！); 21. Senshi no Ketsui (戦士の決意); 22. Iki Tsuzukeru Riyū (生き続ける理由)
3	March 8, 2002	978-4-10-771026-0
23. Senshi-tachi no Kizuna (戦士たちの絆); 24. Wasurete ita Mono (忘れていたもの); 25. Yomigaetta Kako (蘇った過去); 26. Oshiminai Inochi (惜しみない命); 27. Kunren-sei Jidai no Omoide (訓練生時代の想い出); 28. Inochi ni Kaete mo (命にかえても); 29. Lǐ Daijin no Seisai (李大人の制裁); 30. Ushinawareta Namae (失われた名前); 31. Saigo no Ketchaku (最後の決着); 32. Papa (爸爸); 33. Ichinen-buri no Shōgeki (一年ぶりの衝撃)
4	July 9, 2002	978-4-10-771045-1
34. Taiin (退院); 35. Papa to Musume no Hatsu Dēto (パパと娘の初デート); 36. Senjō no Deai to Wakare (船上の出会いと別れ); 37. Kage no Papa (影の爸爸); 38. Okaeri (おかえり); 39. Lǐ Daijin kara no Okurimono (李大人からの贈り物); 40. Oyafukō (親不孝); 41. Chen Rōjin no Mise (陳老人の店); 42. Oshare (おしゃれ); 43. Maki Yado no Senrei (薪宿の洗礼); 44. Iraijin dai Ichigō (依頼人第一号)
5	November 9, 2002	978-4-10-771065-9
45. Koroshi-ya no Shūsei (殺し屋の習性); 46. Take to Benjamin to On'na Shachō (嶽とベンジャミンと女社長); 47. Papa o Sagashite! ! (パパを捜して！！); 48. Papa no Nigaoe (パパの似顔絵); 49. Tānya no Hontō no Egao (ターニャの本当の笑顔); 50. Sogeki Junbi Kanryō (狙撃準備完了); 51. Fūsen no Kuma-san (風船のクマさん); 52. Ka to no Kaiwa (香との会話); 53. Saeko no Tanjōbi (冴子の誕生日); 54. Yume no Naka no Deai (夢の中の出会い); 55. Makimura Kyōdai (槇村兄妹)
6	March 8, 2003	978-4-10-771080-2
56. Ni-biki no Norainu (二匹の野良犬); 57. Norainu no Kokuhaku (野良犬の告白); 58. Oyako no Kizuna (親子の絆); 59. C·H ga Han'nin! ? (C·Hが犯人！ ？); 60. Kokoro no Kizu (心の傷); 61. Kodokuna Shōjo (孤独な少女); 62. Mama no Shinzō (媽媽の心臓); 63. Yume o Mamoru! (夢を守る！); 64. Tsukitsuke Rareta Shinjitsu (突きつけられた真実); 65. Xiāng Yíng no Ketsui (香瑩の決意); 66. Tenshi no Kokoro (天使の心)
7	June 9, 2003	978-4-10-771096-3
*67. Fukōheina Shiawase (不公平な幸せ): 68. Yasashī shin'on (優しい心音); 69. Egao no Futari (笑顔の二人); 70. Xiāng Yíng no Henka (香瑩の変化); 71. Irai wa Koroshi! (依頼は殺し！ ？); 72. Tsuta Waranu Omoi (伝わらぬ思い); 73. Bukiyōna Otoko (不器用な男); 74. Wakare no Go-en-Dama (別れの五円玉); 75. Inochi Yori Taisetsuna Kizuna (命より大切な絆); 76. Mōichido Anogoro ni (もう一度あの頃に); 77. Hontō no Kazoku (本当の家族)
8	September 9, 2003	978-4-10-771113-7
78. Nokosa reta Yubiwa (遺された指輪); 79. Saeko kara no XYZ (冴子からのXYZ); 80. Tāgetto wa Xiāng Yíng (ターゲットは香瑩); 81. Shinzō no Namida (心臓の涙); 82. Kiken'na Nioi (危険な匂い); 83. Kanashiki Renzoku Satsujin-han (哀しき連続殺人犯); 84. Akuma no Endingu (悪魔のエンディング); 85. Ai ni Ueta Akuma (愛に飢えた悪魔); 86. Omoide no Basho (思い出の場所); 87. Yuiitsu no Aijō (唯一の愛情); 88. Atatakai Jūdan (あたたかい銃弾)
9	December 9, 2003	978-4-10-771125-0
89. Okurete kita Shiawase (遅れて来た幸せ); 90. Hajimete no Kanjō (初めての感情); 91. Hontō no Hyōjō (本当の表情); 92. Kore ga, Koi? (これが、恋？); 93. Hakari Shirenu Omoi (計り知れぬ想い); 94. Chichioya ga Musume o Omou Kimochi (父親が娘を想う気持ち); 95. Watashi, Koi Shitemasu (私、恋してます); 96. Tōi Yakusoku (遠い約束); 97. Shiawase na Egao (幸せな笑顔); 98. Hatsukoi, Namida no Wakare (初恋、涙の別れ); 99. Koisuru Hito no Kimochi (恋する人の気持ち)
10	March 9, 2004	978-4-10-771139-7
100. Imōto o Sagashite (妹を捜して); 101. Imōto wa Shiawase datta? (妹は幸せだった？); 102. Shinzō no Han'nō (心臓の反応); 103. Shinjuku no Tenshi (新宿の天使); 104. Kiseki no Tekigō-sei (奇跡の適合性); 105. Omoide no Machi (思い出の街); 106. Chīsana Negai (小さな願い); 107. Makimura no Ketsui (槇村の決意); 108. C·H no Shōtai (C・Hの正体); 109. Liáo kara no Irai (獠からの依頼); 110. Ichizuna Otoko (一途な男)
11	June 9, 2004	978-4-10-771154-0
111. Sayuri no Tabidachi (早百合の旅立ち); 112. Iraijin wa Hittakuri! ? (依頼人はひったくり！ ？); 113. Beibī Toraburu! (ベイビートラブル！); 114. Koibito dōshi no Gokai (恋人同士の誤解); 115. Seiya no Kiseki (聖夜の奇跡); 116. Unmei no Saikai (運命の再会); 117. Futari no Henka (二人の変化); 118. Báilán no Ninmu (白蘭の任務); 119. Sukōpu no Naka no Shinjitsu (スコープの中の真実); 120. Kami kara Sazukarishi ko (神から授かりし子); 121. Hajimete no Aijō" (初めての愛情)
12	September 9, 2004	978-4-10-771173-1
122. Báilán no Ketsui (白蘭の決意); 123. Kanashimi no Kekkō-bi (悲しみの決行日); 124. Ikiru Kate (生きる糧); 125. Uketsuga reshi Inochi (受け継がれし命); 126. Báilán kara no Tegami (白蘭からの手紙); 127. Shinzō no Koe o Shinjite (心臓の声を信じて); 128. Shinzō no Kyōshin (心臓の共振); 129. Ane no Omoi (姉の想い); 130. Ayane no Uso (綾音の嘘); 131. Takahata no Uso (高畑の嘘); 132. Akasa reta Shinjitsu (明かされた真実)
13	November 9, 2004	978-4-10-771184-7
133. Shinzō Ishoku no Risuku (心臓移植のリスク); 134. Ikite... ! (生きて...！); 135. Ikita Akashi (生きた証); 136. Takahata no Omamori (高畑のお守り); 137. Saeko to Nazo no On'nanoko (冴子と謎の女の子); 138. Tokai no Zashiki Warashi (都会の座敷童); 139. Saeko no Okaeshi (冴子のお返し); 140. Odayakana Yume (穏やかな夢); 141. Umibōzu to Zashiki Warashi (海坊主と座敷童); 142. Yogore naki Kokoro (汚れなき心); 143. Mama e no Omoi (ママへの想い)
14	February 9, 2005	978-4-10-771200-4
144. Itsumo Issho (いつも一緒); 145. Kurayami ni Mieta Yūhi (暗闇に見えた夕陽); 146. Yasashiki Tenchō (優しき店長); 147. Kiken'na dai Joyū! (危険な大女優！); 148. Joi no Jijō (ジョイの事情); 149. Omoi Jin wa Kono Machi ni? (思い人はこの街に？); 150. Itoshiki Hito no Katami (愛しき人の形見); 151. Kyōdō Seikatsu Kaishi! (共同生活開始！); 152. Miki no Shiawase (ミキの幸せ); 153. Oyako no Yō ni (親子のように); 154. Joi no Ikisaki (ジョイの行き先)
15	June 9, 2005	978-4-10-771220-2
155. Kokuhaku... ! (告白...！); 156. Kazoku no Shashin (家族の写真); 157. Liáo no Kētairaifu (獠のケータイライフ); 158. Aisareru Riyū (愛される理由); 159. Rabu · Saīn (ラブサ· イーン); 160. Horeta Otoko wa Nazo-darake! ? (ホレた男は謎だらけ！ ？); 161. Koi no Kakugo (恋の覚悟); 162. Liáo no dai Shippai (獠の大失敗); 163. On'na dōshi no Sake (女同士の酒); 164. Sorezore no Basho (それぞれの場所); 165. Yáng no Irai? (楊からの依頼？)
16	September 9, 2005	978-4-10-771236-3
166. Ai wa Chikyū o Sukuu! ? (愛は地球を救う！ ？); 167. Yángfāng no Shigoto (楊芳玉の仕事); 168. Tengoku to Jigoku! ? (天国と地獄！ ？); 169. Kuromaku Arawaru! ! (黒幕現る！！); 170. Yáng Shidō! (楊、始動！); 171. Saikai... ! ! (再会… ！！); 172. Hahanaru Omoi (母なる思い); 173. Akarui Mirai! ? (アカルイミライ！ ？); 174. Reisen no Nayami (麗泉の悩み); 175. Koibito-tachi no Mirai (恋人達の未来); 176. Kanashī Futari (悲しい二人)
17	December 9, 2005	978-4-10-771252-3
177. Otoko no Shin'nen (男の信念); 178. Tōshi no daishō (透視の代償); 179. Egao no Mirai (笑顔の未来); 180. Hikiyose Rareru Unmei (引き寄せられる運命); 181. Mirai o Kaeru Otoko (未来を変える男); 182. Xìnhón ga Oshiete Kureta Koto (信宏が教えてくれた事); 183. Reiko no Mirai (麗子の未来); 184. Gifu wa Tsurai yo! (義父はつらいよ！); 185. Umibōzu to Sensei (海坊主と先生); 186. Henshitsu-sha wa Umibōzu! ? (変質者は海坊主！ ？); 187. Miki ga Yukue Fumei! ? (ミキが行方不明！ ？)
18	March 9, 2006	978-4-10-771267-7
188. Umi Gakkyū e Ikou! (海学級へ行こう！); 189. Henshitsu-sha, Arawaru! (変質者、 現る！); 190. Basu Jakku! (バスジャック！); 191. Kyōfu no Kācheisu! (恐怖のカーチェイス！); 192. Oyako no Denwa (親子の電話); 193. Ikari no Ichigeki! (怒りの一撃！); 194. Oyako no Kakugo (親子の覚悟); 195. Natsuyasumi no Owari (夏休みの終わり); 196. Yáng Sairai! ! (楊、再来！！); 197. Yubiwa no Kioku (指輪の記憶); 198. Kurisumasu Purezento (クリスマスプレゼント)
19	June 9, 2006	978-4-10-771277-6
199. Ikoku kara no Kyūshoku-sha! (異国からの求婚者！); 200. Mōsō chō Tokkyū ga Yattekita! (妄想超特急がやってきた！); 201. Ōji to Xiāng Yíng no Hatsu Dēto (皇子と香瑩の初デート); 202. Kinō no Teki wa Kyō no Koibito! (昨日の敵は今日の恋人！); 203. Mao no Kōshō (マオの交渉); 204. Kazoku no Fūkei (家族の風景); 205. Nichijō ni Hisomu Akuma (日常に潜むアクマ); 206. Ōji no Kunō (皇子の苦悩); 207. Sake to Namida to Ōji to Hahaoya! (酒と泪と皇子と母親！ ？); 208. Umibe no Kokuhaku! (海辺の告白！); 209. Hotobashiru Omoi! (迸る想い！)
20	September 9, 2006	978-4-10-771295-0
210. Mao no Ketsudan (マオの決断); 211. (男二人、車中にて); 212. (長生きの代償); 213. (男の性！); 214. (オペレーションナシクズシ！); 215. (C・H資格テスト！); 216. (追う女、待つ女); 217. (楊の生きる理由); 218. (大幸運期到来！！); 219. (私がパパです！); 220. (謎のお父さん！)
21	January 1, 2007	978-4-10-771313-1
221. (18歳はシゲキがお好き！ ？); 222. (カギは香瑩にあり！ ？); 223. (紗世は名探偵！ ？); 224. (重ねる嘘、重なる罪); 225. (父のいる店); 226. (真実と紗世); 227. (香瑩、入学す！); 228. (私達の学校); 229. (想い、街に息づいて); 230. (ラブレターパニック！); 231. (僕ら、シャンイン親衛隊！)
22	May 9, 2007	978-4-10-771334-6
232. (机男と親衛隊！); 233. (嫌な予感); 234. (いい子の行き着く場所); 235. (肉弾戦); 236. (危険な出会い); 237. (愛色龙); 238. (花園学校の未来); 239. (乙玲の姉); 240. (変色龙の誘惑); 241. (狙撃); 242. (香瑩の答え)
23	August 9, 2007	978-4-10-771350-6
243. (覚悟); 244. (恋はアフターで！); 245. (初アフターはストーカー付！); 246. (雲のように); 247. (悲痛な願い); 248. (気づかぬ優しさ); 249. (見えない景色); 250. (暖かい場所へ); 251. (意外な弱点); 252. (初めての経験); 253. (表への一歩)
24	November 9, 2007	978-4-10-771367-4
254. (嫉妬); 255. (仲間); 256. (新スポンサー); 257. (陳さんの暴走); 258. (及第点の答え); 259. (香瑩の怒り); 260. (消えない記憶); 261. (武道館決戦); 262. (仁志の涙); 263. (私の立ち位置); 264. (夏の再会)
25	February 9, 2008	978-4-10-771381-0
265. (海坊主と葉月); 266. (誤解); 267. (葉月の父); 268. (ファルコンのお守り); 269. (墓参り); 270. (ファルコンの秘密); 271. (キバナコスモス); 272. (大好きなんです); 273. (親子の愛); 274. (葉月の悩み); 275. (カメレオンの罠)
26	May 9, 2008	978-4-10-771397-1
276. (招かれざる客); 277. (虎の尾); 278. (最凶悪危険人物); 279. (一億の勝負); 280. (母の想い); 281. (ぷるん); 282. (カメレオン動く); 283. (灯); 284. (ジンクス); 285. (不安な夜); 286. (潮騒)
27	September 9, 2008	978-4-10-771420-6
287. (小さなXYZ); 288. (家族のために); 289. (ロスタイム); 290. (損な役回り); 291. (罪悪感); 292. (笑い泣き); 293. (傲慢); 294. (懺悔と供養); 295. (最期の言葉); 296. (本当の姿); 297. (親子の時間)
28	December 9, 2008	978-4-10-771444-2
298. (幸せの涙); 299. (陰影); 300. (恋の季節); 301. (潜入); 302. (身代わり); 303. (金木犀の香り); 304. (似た者同士); 305. (確かな鼓動); 306. (幸せのベール); 307. (誓いの言葉); 308. (新婚旅行)
29	March 9, 2009	978-4-10-771468-8
309. (離れていても); 310. (真実); 311. (宣戦布告); 312. (影武者); 313. (長い一日); 314. (怪我の功名); 315. (仕組まれた黙秘); 316. (冴子の覚悟); 317. (現行犯逮捕); 318. (現場復帰); 319. (黒幕)
30	July 9, 2009	978-4-10-771496-1
320. (制裁の行方); 321. (激昂); 322. (カメレオンの遺産); 323. (怪訝なXYZ); 324. (笑顔の理由); 325. (老人の貴物); 326. (対極の男); 327. (昼行灯); 328. (敵情視察); 329. (潜入！CH); 330. (人質交換)
31	November 9, 2009	978-4-10-771530-2
331. (只今参上！); 332. (君だけのヒーロー); 333. (いつかの笑顔); 334. (天使のサイモン); 335. (カエルの子はカエル); 336. (ふたつの命); 337. (ちょっとの特別); 338. (空のC・H); 339. (繋いだ手から); 340. (小さな依頼人); 341. (涙の理由)
32	March 9, 2010	978-4-10-771554-8
342. (偽りの再会); 343. (会いたい); 344. (ママを捜して…); 345. (忘却の代償); 346. (嘘だと言って...); 347. (優しい嘘); 348. (たくさんの月); 349. (希望の風); 350. (陳さんの策謀); 351. (薔薇と御曹司); 352. (巡る想い)
33	September 9, 2010	978-4-10-771588-3
353. (恋の吊り橋効果); 354. (今日限りの自由); 355. (受け止める覚悟); 356. (生きる目的); 357. (陳老人暗躍); 358. (ギフト); 359. (愛の選択); 360. (父と息子); 361. (二人分のギフト); 362. (乱暴な天使); 363. (恋の行方)

=== Angel Heart: 1st Season ===
No.	Release date	ISBN
1	March 19, 2012	978-4-19-980073-3
Chapters 1–13
2	March 19, 2012	978-4-19-980074-0
Chapters 14–29
3	April 20, 2012	978-4-19-980080-1
Chapters 30–44
4	April 20, 2012	978-4-19-980081-8
Chapters 45–59
5	May 19, 2012	978-4-19-980086-3
Chapters 60–75
6	May 19, 2012	978-4-19-980087-0
Chapters 76–90
7	June 20, 2012	978-4-19-980091-7
Chapters 91–105
8	June 20, 2012	978-4-19-980092-4
Chapters 106–120
9	July 20, 2012	978-4-19-980098-6
Chapters 121–135
10	July 20, 2012	978-4-19-980099-3
Chapters 136–150
11	August 20, 2012	978-4-19-980102-0
Chapters 151–165
12	August 20, 2012	978-4-19-980103-7
Chapters 166–180
13	September 20, 2012	978-4-19-980109-9
Chapters 181–195
14	September 20, 2012	978-4-19-980110-5
Chapters 196–210
15	October 20, 2012	978-4-19-980114-3
Chapters 211–225
16	October 20, 2012	978-4-19-980115-0
Chapters 226–240
17	November 20, 2012	978-4-19-980121-1
Chapters 241–255
18	November 20, 2012	978-4-19-980122-8
Chapters 256–270
19	December 20, 2012	978-4-19-980127-3
Chapters 271–286
20	December 20, 2012	978-4-19-980128-0
Chapters 286–302
21	January 19, 2013	978-4-19-980134-1
Chapters 303–318
22	January 19, 2013	978-4-19-980135-8
Chapters 319–333
23	February 20, 2013	978-4-19-980137-2
Chapters 334–348
24	February 20, 2013	978-4-19-980138-9
Chapters 349–363

=== Angel Heart: 2nd Season ===
No.	Release date	ISBN
1	March 22, 2011	978-4-19-980001-6
2	September 20, 2011	978-4-19-980035-1
3	March 19, 2012	978-4-19-980069-6
4	August 20, 2012	978-4-19-980100-6
5	January 19, 2013	978-4-19-980130-3
6	June 20, 2013	978-4-19-980148-8
7	November 20, 2013	978-4-19-980170-9
8	March 20, 2014	978-4-19-980197-6
9	September 20, 2014	978-4-19-980232-4
10	February 20, 2015	978-4-19-980256-0
11	August 18, 2015	978-4-19-980280-5
12	October 20, 2015	978-4-19-980300-0
13	April 20, 2016	978-4-19-980341-3
14	September 20, 2016	978-4-19-980365-9
15	February 20, 2017	978-4-19-980393-2
16	July 20, 2017	978-4-19-980430-4
