= List of apocalyptic films =

This is a list of apocalyptic feature-length films. All films within this list feature either the end of the world, a prelude to such an end (such as a world taken over by a viral infection), and/or a post-apocalyptic setting.

== Pre-1960 ==
- The End of the World (1916)
- End of the World (1931)
- Deluge (1933)
- Things to Come (1936)
- Five (1951)
- When Worlds Collide (1951)
- Captive Women (1952)
- Robot Monster (1953)
- Day the World Ended (1955)
- World Without End (1956)
- The Lost Missile (1958)
- Teenage Caveman (1958)
- On the Beach (1959)
- The World, the Flesh and the Devil (1959)

== 1960–1969 ==
- Beyond the Time Barrier (1960)
- Last Woman on Earth (1960)
- Battle of the Worlds (1961)
- The Last War (1961)
- The Day the Earth Caught Fire (1961)
- The Creation of the Humanoids (1962)
- Panic in Year Zero! (1962)
- The Day of the Triffids (1962)
- This Is Not a Test (1962)
- La Jetée (1962)
- Ladybug Ladybug (1963)
- Dr. Strangelove or: How I Learned To Stop Worrying and Love the Bomb (1964)
- The Time Travelers (1964)
- Fail-Safe (1964)
- The Last Man on Earth (1964)
- Crack in the World (1965)
- Daleks – Invasion Earth: 2150 A.D. (1966)
- In the Year 2889 (1967)
- Late August at the Hotel Ozone (1967)
- Night of the Living Dead (1968)
- Planet of the Apes (1968)
- The Seed of Man (1969)
- The Bed-Sitting Room (1969)

== 1970–1979 ==
- Colossus: The Forbin Project (1970)
- Beneath the Planet of the Apes (1970)
- No Blade of Grass (1970)
- Gas-s-s-s (1970)
- The Andromeda Strain (1971)
- Escape from the Planet of the Apes (1971)
- The Omega Man (1971)
- Glen and Randa (1971)
- A Clockwork Orange (1972)
- Beware! The Blob (1972)
- A Thief in the Night (1972)
- Conquest of the Planet of the Apes (1972)
- A Distant Thunder (1972)
- Silent Running (1972)
- Soylent Green (1973)
- Battle for the Planet of the Apes (1973)
- Genesis II (1973)
- The Final Programme (The Last Days of Man on Earth) (1973)
- Zardoz (1974)
- Phase IV (1974)
- Planet Earth (1974)
- Where Have All The People Gone? (1974)
- Black Moon (1975)
- The Noah (1975)
- Death Race 2000 (1975)
- The Ultimate Warrior (1975)
- A Boy and His Dog (1975)
- The Late, Great Planet Earth (1976)
- Logan's Run (1976)
- The People Who Own the Dark (1976)
- Damnation Alley (1977)
- End of the World (1977)
- Holocaust 2000 (1977)
- Wizards (1977)
- The Last Wave (1977)
- Dawn of the Dead (1978)
- Invasion of the Body Snatchers (1978)
- Mad Max (1979)
- Quintet (1979)
- Ravagers (1979)
- The Shape of Things to Come (1979)
- Stalker (1979)

== 1980–1989 ==
- Virus (1980)
- Phoenix 2772 (1980)
- Image of the Beast (1981)
- Escape from New York (1981)
- Mad Max 2 (The Road Warrior) (1981)
- Malevil (1981)
- Battletruck (1982)
- World War III (1982)
- Café Flesh (1982)
- Blade Runner (1982)
- 1990: The Bronx Warriors (1982)
- The Day After (1983)
- Le Dernier Combat (1983)
- The New Barbarians (1983)
- Stryker (1983)
- Testament (1983)
- The Prodigal Planet (1983)
- Exterminators of the Year 3000 (1983)
- 2020 Texas Gladiators (1983)
- 2019, After the Fall of New York (1983)
- One Night Stand (1984)
- When the Wind Blows (1984)
- Sexmission (1984)
- Threads (1984)
- Nausicaä of the Valley of the Wind (1984)
- Night of the Comet (1984)
- Das Arche Noah Prinzip (1984)
- The Terminator (1984)
- Day of the Dead (1985)
- The Quiet Earth (1985)
- Mad Max Beyond Thunderdome (1985)
- Radioactive Dreams (1985)
- Def-Con 4 (1985)
- Wheels of Fire (1985)
- America 3000 (1986)
- Dead Man's Letters (1986)
- Fist of the North Star (1986)
- Land of Doom (1986)
- Solarbabies (1986)
- Steel Dawn (1987)
- Cherry 2000 (1987)
- Interzone (1987)
- The Seventh Sign (1988)
- Akira (1988)
- Miracle Mile (1988)
- Hell Comes to Frogtown (1988)
- A Visitor to a Museum (1989)
- The Blood of Heroes (The Salute of the Jugger) (1989)
- Bunker Palace Hôtel (1989)
- Cyborg (1989)
- Millennium (1989)

== 1990–1999 ==
- Aftershock (1990)
- By Dawn's Early Light (1990)
- Solar Crisis (1990)
- The Handmaid's Tale (1990)
- Hardware (1990)
- Circuitry Man (1990)
- Terminator 2: Judgment Day (1991)
- Until the End of the World (1991)
- The Rapture (1991)
- Neon City (1991)
- Delicatessen (1991)
- Split Second (1992)
- American Cyborg: Steel Warrior (1993)
- Body Snatchers (1993)
- The Last Border (1993)
- Without Warning (1994)
- Plughead Rewired: Circuitry Man II (1994)
- In the Mouth of Madness (1994)
- 12 Monkeys (1995)
- Sentinel 2099 (1995)
- Steel Frontier (1995)
- Tank Girl (1995)
- Judge Dredd (1995)
- Waterworld (1995)
- The Prophecy (1995)
- The Arrival (1996)
- Omega Doom (1996)
- Escape from L.A. (1996)
- The End of Evangelion (1997)
- The Postman (1997)
- Future Fear (1997)
- Last Night (1998)
- The Prophecy 2 (1998)
- Six String Samurai (1998)
- Beowulf (1999)
- Dogma (1999)
- End of Days (1999)
- The Matrix (1999)
- The Omega Code (1999)

== 2000–2009 ==
- Fail Safe (2000)
- The Last Warrior (2000)
- Left Behind (2000)
- Lost Souls (2000)
- The Prophecy 3: The Ascent (2000)
- On the Beach (2000)
- Titan A.E. (2000)
- Final Fantasy: The Spirits Within (2001)
- Megiddo: The Omega Code 2 (2001)
- A.I. Artificial Intelligence (2001)
- Blue Gender:The Warrior (2002)
- 28 Days Later (2002)
- The Time Machine (2002)
- Reign of Fire (2002)
- Resident Evil (2002)
- Returner (2002)
- Terminator 3: Rise of the Machines (2003)
- Dragon Head (2003)
- Dreamcatcher (2003)
- Save the Green Planet! (2003)
- Time of the Wolf (2003)
- The Animatrix (2003)
- The Matrix Reloaded (2003)
- The Matrix Revolutions (2003)
- Dawn of the Dead (2004)
- The Day After Tomorrow (2004)
- Shaun of the Dead (2004)
- Resident Evil: Apocalypse (2004)
- The Hitchhiker's Guide to the Galaxy (2005)
- Æon Flux (2005)
- The Prophecy: Forsaken (2005)
- War of the Worlds (2005)
- Land of the Dead (2005)
- Supervolcano (2005)
- Children of Men (2006)
- Idiocracy (2006)
- Right at Your Door (2006)
- Solar Attack (2006)
- Southland Tales (2006)
- Planet Terror (2007)
- Tooth and Nail (2007)
- The Signal (2007)
- The Invasion (2007)
- Resident Evil: Extinction (2007)
- 20 Years After (2007)
- The Dark Hour (2007)
- Diary of the Dead (2007)
- 28 Weeks Later (2007)
- I Am Legend (2007)
- 2012: Doomsday (2008)
- Babylon A.D. (2008)
- Blindness (2008)
- Resident Evil: Degeneration (2008)
- WALL-E (2008)
- Daybreakers (2008)
- Aftermath: Population Zero (2008)
- Doomsday (2008)
- City of Ember (2008)
- The Happening (2008)
- Pontypool (2008)
- The Road (2009)
- Pandorum (2009)
- Watchmen (2009)
- 9 (2009)
- Knowing (2009)
- Survival of the Dead (2009)
- Zombieland (2009)
- 2012 (2009)
- Terminator Salvation (2009)
- Battlestar Galactica: The Plan (2009)
- Happy End (2009)
- Carriers (2009)
- Earth 2100 (2009)

== 2010–2019 ==
- Juan of the Dead (2010)
- Monsters (2010)
- Stake Land (2010)
- Vanishing on 7th Street (2010)
- Legion (2010)
- Maximum Shame (2010)
- The Book of Eli (2010)
- Resident Evil: Afterlife (2010)
- 4:44 Last Day on Earth (2011)
- Deadheads (2011)
- Perfect Sense (2011)
- The Darkest Hour (2011)
- The Day (2011)
- The Divide (2011)
- Melancholia (2011)
- Hell (2011)
- Take Shelter (2011)
- Rise of the Planet of the Apes (2011)
- The Cabin in the Woods (2011)
- The Hunger Games (2012)
- Seeking a Friend for the End of the World (2012)
- 5 Shells (2012)
- Dredd (2012)
- It's a Disaster (2012)
- Resident Evil: Retribution (2012)
- Resident Evil: Damnation (2012)
- Cloud Atlas (2012)
- Cockneys vs Zombies (2012)
- The Battery (2012)
- Rapture-Palooza (2013)
- The Colony (2013)
- These Final Hours (2013)
- This Is the End (2013)
- After the Dark (2013)
- After Earth (2013)
- Los Últimos Días (2013)
- Antisocial (2013)
- Snowpiercer (2013)
- Oblivion (2013)
- Warm Bodies (2013)
- World War Z (2013)
- Edge of Tomorrow (2013)
- Forever's End (2013)
- The World's End (2013)
- The Host (2013)
- Goodbye World (2013)
- Die Gstettensaga: The Rise of Echsenfriedl (2014)
- Wyrmwood: Road of the Dead (2014)
- The Rover (2014)
- Zodiac: Signs of the Apocalypse (2014)
- X-Men: Days of Future Past (2014)
- Young Ones (2014)
- Aftermath (2014)
- The Maze Runner (2014)
- Dawn of the Planet of the Apes (2014)
- Interstellar (2014)
- The Last Survivors (2014)
- Noah (2014)
- Autómata (2014)
- Scouts Guide to the Zombie Apocalypse (2015)
- Crumbs (2015)
- Turbo Kid (2015)
- Z for Zachariah (2015)
- The End of the World and the Cat's Disappearance (2015)
- The Walking Deceased (2015)
- Extinction (2015)
- Hidden (2015)
- Air (2015)
- Into the Forest (2015)
- JeruZalem (2015)
- The Survivalist (2015)
- Attack on Titan (2015)
- Terminator Genisys (2015)
- Maze Runner: The Scorch Trials (2015)
- Mad Max: Fury Road (2015)
- Maggie (2015)
- 10 Cloverfield Lane (2016)
- Train to Busan (2016)
- Seoul Station (2016)
- I Am a Hero (2016)
- The Fifth Wave (2016)
- Cell (2016)
- Day of Reckoning (2016)
- The Girl with All the Gifts (2016)
- Diverge (2016)
- The Northlander (2016)
- Stephanie (2017)
- It Comes at Night (2017)
- Junk Head (2017)
- War for the Planet of the Apes (2017)
- Resident Evil: The Final Chapter (2017)
- Resident Evil: Vendetta (2017)
- Everything Beautiful Is Far Away (2017)
- Anna and the Apocalypse (2017)
- Bokeh (2017)
- Blade Runner 2049 (2017)
- Cargo (2017)
- Here Alone (2017)
- After The End (2017)
- Deep (2017)
- Bird Box (2018)
- Blue World Order (2018)
- The Domestics (2018)
- Future World (2018)
- How It Ends (2018)
- I Think We're Alone Now (2018)
- In My Room (2018)
- Maze Runner: The Death Cure (2018)
- Mortal Engines (2018)
- The Night Eats the World (2018)
- Patient Zero (2018)
- A Quiet Place (2018)
- Scorched Earth (2018)
- What Still Remains (2018)
- This World Alone (2018)
- Blood Quantum (2019)
- Zombieland: Double Tap (2019)
- The Wandering Earth (2019)
- The Silence (2019)
- Io (2019)
- Terminator: Dark Fate (2019)
- Light of My Life (2019)
- The Lego Movie 2: The Second Part (2019)
- 3022 (2019)

== 2020-2029 ==
- 2067 (2020)
- #Alive (2020)
- Alone (2020)
- Friend of the World (2020)
- Greenland (2020)
- Love and Monsters (2020)
- Train to Busan Presents: Peninsula (2020)
- The Midnight Sky (2020)
- Songbird (2020)
- How It Ends (2021)
- Quarantine (2021)
- Silent Night (2021)
- Army of the Dead (2021)
- Awake (2021)
- Don't Look Up (2021)
- The Tomorrow War (2021)
- Finch (2021)
- Mother/Android (2021)
- The Mitchells vs. The Machines (2021)
- The Matrix Resurrections (2021)
- A Quiet Place Part II (2021)
- Resident Evil: Welcome to Raccoon City (2021)
- Vesper (2022)
- Polaris (2022)
- Black Crab (2022)
- Resident Evil: Death Island (2023)
- The Wandering Earth 2 (2023)
- Bird Box Barcelona (2023)
- Zom 100: Bucket List of the Dead (2023)
- The Creator (2023)
- Foe (2023)
- Leave the World Behind (2023)
- Arcadian (2024)
- Breathe (2024)
- Kingdom of the Planet of the Apes (2024)
- Furiosa: A Mad Max Saga (2024)
- A Quiet Place: Day One (2024)
- Apocalypse Z: The Beginning of the End (2024)
- Elevation (2024)
- 2073 (2024)
- Love Me (2024)
- Flow (2024)
- Párvulos: Children of the Apocalypse (2024)
- In the Lost Lands (2025)
- The Electric State (2025)
- 28 Years Later (2025)
- The Great Flood (2025)
- Afterburn (2025)
- Greenland 2: Migration (2026)
- 28 Years Later: The Bone Temple (2026)
- Iron Lung (2026)
- The Last House (2026)
- The Dog Stars (2026)
- A Quiet Place Part III (2027)

== See also ==
- List of apocalyptic and post-apocalyptic fiction
- List of disaster films
- List of dystopian films
