= Phoenix Film Festival =

Annual film festival in Arizona

Coordinates: 33.6584°N 111.9325°W

- Location: Phoenix, Arizona, United States
- Founded: 2001
- Website: phoenixfilmfestival.com

Phoenix Film Festival is a festival that celebrates feature films, documentaries, short films and their creators. Started in 2001, the annual celebration takes place in the city of Phoenix, Arizona. The Festival is run under the umbrella of the 501(c)3 non-profit Phoenix Film Foundation. The Phoenix Film Festival is the largest attended festival in Arizona. Since 2014 it has been held in the Harkins Scottsdale 101 Theatre.

In 2024, the festival hosted 290 screenings, parties, and workshops over eleven days and has hosted notable members of the film industry such as Kevin Bacon, Bo Burnham, Demetri Martin, Kyra Sedgwick, Laurence Fishburne, Edward James Olmos and Danny Trejo. The festival showed Arizona premieres of Coda, Chevalier, Renfield, Eighth Grade, Boyhood, Won't You Be My Neighbor, and many more.

== History ==
The organization was founded in 2000 with the idea of starting a festival for filmmakers in Arizona, by two independent filmmakers, including Chris LaMont. The first festival was held with the help of Program Director Greg Hall and World Cinema Director Slobodan Popovic. Jason Carney has been the executive director since 2005. In 2025, Jason Carney was named CEO and Samantha Bartram was named COO.

== Past winners ==
=== Best US Feature Film ===
- 2025 - Burt
- 2024 - Et Tu
- 2023 - The Dual
- 2022 - Americanish
- 2021 - Trees of Peace
- 2020 - Seneca
- 2019 - This World Alone
- 2018 - The Idea of Manhood
- 2017 - Brave New Jersey
- 2016 - Coming Through The Rye
- 2015 - Wildlike
- 2014 - The House That Jack Built
- 2013 - Putzel
- 2012 - Shuffle
- 2011 - A Little Help
- 2010 - The Rivals
- 2009 - Lightbulb
- 2008 - Take
- 2007 - Little Chenier
- 2006 - Andrew Jenks, Room 335
- 2005 - Checking Out
- 2004 - Break a Leg
- 2003 - Melvin Goes to Dinner
- 2002 - Do It for Uncle Manny
- 2001 - Middlemen
