= Fist of the North Star (1986 film) =

Japanese anime film

- Theatrical release poster
- Directed by: Toyoo Ashida
- Written by: Susumu Takaku
- Based on: Fist of the North Star by Buronson; Tetsuo Hara
- Produced by: Ken Ariga; Yoshio Takami
- Starring: Akira Kamiya; Kenji Utsumi
- Narrated by: Taro Ishida
- Cinematography: Tamio Hosoda
- Edited by: Masaaki Hanai
- Music by: Katsuhisa Hattori
- Production company: Toei Animation
- Distributed by: Toei Company
- Release date: 8 March 1986
- Running time: 110 minutes
- Country: Japan
- Language: Japanese
- Budget: ¥700 million
- Box office: ¥1.8 billion

Fist of the North Star (Japanese: 北斗の拳, Hepburn: Hokuto no Ken) (Note: The 2008 Region 2 DVD release is titled Gekijōban Seikimatsu Kyūseishu Densetsu Hokuto no Ken (劇場版 世紀末救世主伝説 北斗の拳; lit. 'Fist of the North Star Theatrical Edition: The Legend of the Savior of the Century's End'), distinguishing it from the Hokuto no Ken TV series aired from 1984 to 1986. The 2009 Region 1 DVD uses the title Fist of the North Star: The Movie.) is a 1986 Japanese animated post-apocalyptic martial arts film based on the manga of the same name. It was produced by Toei Animation, the same studio who worked on the TV series that was airing at the time, with most of the same cast and crew working on both projects.

The film serves as a loose adaptation of the early chapters of the manga, covering up to Chapter 72 (Kenshiro's first fight with Raoh), changing the order of key events and how the story ultimately unfolds. However, the film retains the more violent content of the original manga, which the television series toned down.

== Plot ==
A global nuclear war has turned most of Earth into a contaminated wasteland, with humanity's survivors now fighting over the few uncontaminated food and water supplies still remaining. Kenshiro, a master of the deadly martial art Hokuto Shinken, is traveling with his fiancee Yuria when they are confronted by a gang led by Ken's former friend Shin, a master of the rival Nanto Seiken style. Shin proclaims that he has been in love with Yuria for a long time and challenges Ken over her, with no law interrupting in the matter.

After defeating Ken in combat, Shin engraves seven wounds on Ken's chest - forming the pattern of the Hokuto asterism - and leaves him for dead, taking Yuria with him. Ken's eldest brother-in-training Raoh, having witnessed the fight without intervening, returns to his dojo, where he finds his sensei Ryuken meditating. Raoh challenges Ryuken's decision to choose Ken as the Hokuto Shinken successor over him and kills him, proclaiming he will become the ruler of the new world. A year passes and Ken now wanders the wasteland as a hero who protects the weak and innocent from those who prey on them. He rescues a couple of young children named Bat and Lin from a gang of bandits and allies himself with another Nanto Seiken master named Rei, who is searching for his kidnapped sister Airi.

Ken learns that Airi's kidnapper is none other than Jagi, another former brother-in-training who has been impersonating Ken in an attempt to tarnish his reputation and draw him out. Ken heads to Jagi's hideout and defeats him, rescuing Airi in the process. Before he dies a gruesome death, Jagi reveals that he was the one who convinced Shin to betray Ken and that he is now living with Yuria in his stronghold, the city of Southern Cross. Elsewhere, Raoh, now a conqueror known as Ken-oh (King of Fists), has amassed a huge army, expanding his domain by defeating rival warlords and begins heading to Southern Cross. There, Yuria is treated with a life of luxury, living under the rule of Shin, who now leads his own army as well.

However, Yuria refuses Shin's gifts of affection, longing to be reunited with Ken. When she overhears that Ken is still alive, she attempts to sneak out of the city, only to be taken captive by Raoh, who challenges Shin to a fight to the death. A while later, Kenshiro arrives at Southern Cross, only to find the city in flames and Shin's soldiers dead. Shin is still alive and fights Ken, but the battle does not last long, as Shin has already suffered a mortal wound from his encounter with Raoh. Before dying, Shin tells Ken that Raoh has taken Yuria captive and has headed to Cassandra, the City of Wailing Demons. Lin arrives at Cassandra along with Bat and Rei, where they witness Raoh's army marching through the streets. Lin sees Yuria being held by Raoh's men during the parade and decides to break into Raoh's dungeon later that night with Bat.

The two meet Yuria in her cell and give her a plant grown from a seed Yuria gave to Ken before leaving, giving hope that Earth's soil is fertile enough for plants to grow. The plant catches Raoh's attention and Yuria is immediately sentenced to a public execution the following morning. Rei challenges Raoh, but he proves to be no match for him. Ken rushes to Cassandra, but arrives too late to stop Raoh from inflicting a mortal wound on Rei. After Rei dies, Kenshiro and Raoh unleash their full fighting aura to battle each other, destroying most of Cassandra in the process and leaving both substantially injured and exhausted of their strength. Raoh defeats Kenshiro by managing to knock him unconscious. However, before Raoh can deliver the finishing blow, Lin interrupts the fight and implores him to spare Ken's life. Impressed by her bravery, Raoh agrees to Lin's request and walks away, vowing to postpone the battle for another day. Ken leaves Lin and Bat, and continues his search for Yuria, who mysteriously vanished during the final battle.

== Cast ==
Character	Japanese voice actor	English dubbing actor (Streamline Pictures, 1991)
Kenshirō	Akira Kamiya	John Vickery as Ken
Yuria	Yuriko Yamamoto	Melodee Spivack as Julia
Raoh	Kenji Utsumi	Wally Burr
Jagi	Chikao Ōtsuka (Note: Ōtsuka replaces Kōji Totani, who played Jagi in the television series.)	Dan Woren
Shin	Toshio Furukawa	Michael McConnohie
Rei	Kaneto Shiozawa	Gregory Snegoff as Ray
Lin	Tomiko Suzuki	Holly Sidell as Lynn
Bat	Mie Suzuki	Tony Oliver as Bart
Airi	Arisa Andō	Barbara Goodson as Alei
Ryūken	Junji Chiba	Jeff Corey
Zeed	Hidekatsu Shibata	Mike Forest as Zenda
Heart	Junpei Takiguchi	Dave Mallow as Hart
Fox	Takeshi Aono	Tom Wyner
Jackal	Hiroshi Ōtake	Carl Macek
Uighur	Daisuke Gōri	Gregory Snegoff as Uygle
Kiba Daiō	Takeshi Watabe	James Avery as Boss Fang
Galf	Jōji Yanami	Tom Wyner as Thugmeister
Ukoku	Kōhei Miyauchi	Steve Bulen as Wise Man
Colonel	Kōji Yada	Dave Mallow as Captain
Nunchaku	Yūsaku Yara	Steve Bulen as Nunchuck
Kubaru	Shigeru Chiba	Kirk Thornton as Head Banger
Z Gang	Banjō Ginga; Ryōichi Tanaka; Yasuo Tanaka	Steve Bulen; Mike Forest; Dave Mallow; Kirk Thornton as Z Gang
Old Woman	Reiko Suzuki	Catherine Battistone as Old Woman
Dying Woman	Yōko Kawanami	Lisa Michelson as Dying Woman
Additional Voices (Thugs/Villagers)	Masayuki Katō; Michitaka Kobayashi; Masaharu Satō; Ikuya Sawaki; Kōzō Shioya; Yasuo Tanaka	Steve Bulen; Wally Burr; Barbara Goodson; Wendee Lee as Pillage Victim; Edie Mirman as Screamer; Doug Stone; Kirk Thornton as Torture Victim
Narrator	Tarō Ishida	Jeff Corey

== Soundtrack ==
Hokuto no Ken: Feature Length Animated Movie Soundtrack

Soundtrack album by Katsuhisa Hattori and Kodomo Band
- Released: March 21, 1986
- Length: 38:31
- Label: Pony Canyon

Singles from Hokuto no Ken
- 1. "Heart of Madness" Released: February 21, 1986

All music is composed by Katsuhisa Hattori, except for tracks 9 and 18, which were composed and performed by Tsuyoshi Ujiki.

Track list
No.	Title	English translation	Length
1.	"プロローグ 緑の地球" (Midori no Chikyū)	Prologue: Green Earth	3:14
2.	"北斗神拳伝承者 リュウケン" (Hokuto Shin Ken Denshosha Ryūken)	Ryuken the Hokuto Shin Ken Master	1:44
3.	"ケンシロウ敗北!" (Kenshirō Haiboku!)	Kenshiro Defeated!	1:35
4.	"美しい瞳 リンのテーマ" (Utsukushii Hitomi, self cover of "Le Rhone")	Beautiful Eyes (Lin's theme)	1:27
5.	"ジードの襲撃" (Jīdo no Shūgeki)	Zeed's Assault	1:46
6.	"追跡者たち" (Tsuisekisha-tachi)	Pursuers	2:17
7.	"ジャギの陰謀" (Jagi no Inbō)	Jagi's Scheme	2:12
8.	"怒れるラウオ(拳王)" (Ikareru Raō (Ken-ō))	The Wrath of Raoh the Conqueror	1:36
9.	"Heart of Madness"		3:23
10.	"ケンシロウ復活" (Kenshirō Fukkatsu)	Kenshiro's Resurrection	1:57
11.	"南斗水鳥拳 レイのテーマ" (Nanto Suichō Ken)	The Nanto Waterfowl Fist (Rei's theme)	0:56
12.	"アイリの悲哀" (Airi no Hiai)	Airi's Sorrow	1:46
13.	"ハートとの対決" (Hāto-to no Taiketsu)	Showdown with Heart	1:53
14.	"野望 ラオウのテーマ" (Yabō)	Ambitions (Raoh's theme)	0:59
15.	"さらば宿敵、シン!" (Saraba tomo, Shin!)	Farewell, My Rival Shin!	2:06
16.	"拳王軍行進" (Ken-ō Gun Kōshin)	The March of the Conqueror's Army	1:46
17.	"愛と別れ ユリアのテーマ" (Ai to Wakare)	Love and Separation (Yuria's theme)	2:34
18.	"Purple Eyes"		5:20

== Releases ==
=== Japanese ===
Hokuto no Ken was released in Japan on VHS in 1988, two years after its theatrical release. The late release was due to the decision to animate a new ending. Unlike the theatrical version, in which Kenshiro falls unconscious during the final battle, the revised ending has both fighters still standing when they're about to deliver their mutual finishing blows before they're interrupted by Lin. The movie was later released in Japan on Laserdisc on September 21, 1995.

On November 21, 2008, the movie was released on DVD for the first time in Japan with a remastered high definition transfer. This new version of the film included the theatrical cut for the first time on Japanese home video (albeit, only for the first print run). Because the revised ending was recorded on a different film stock, it did not undergo the remastering process, resulting in a drop in video quality when the scene is played.

=== International ===
In the United States, the film was licensed by Streamline Pictures and given an English dub produced by Carl Macek, with a theatrical premiere held in Salt Lake City, Utah on September 27, 1991; it was later released on VHS in September 1992. In 1994, Manga Entertainment released it in the United Kingdom and Australia. The English script, written by Tom Wyner, is not a direct translation of the Japanese original, resulting in drastic plot differences between the two versions (such as the explanation for Airi's blindness and the cause of Shin's death). The theatrical ending was used for this version and the end credits theme, "Purple Eyes", is played without vocals. The English dub was given an early DVD release in North America by Image Entertainment in 1998.

A version of the Italian dub that was released on VHS by Granata Press in 1993 under the title Ken il Guerriero was based on a workprint cut which features some of the violent scenes that are blurred out in the Japanese theatrical version (such as the scene in which Shin engraves the seven scars on Kenshiro's chest) without any discoloration or blurring. It also features a scene in which Dogmaster Galf (a minor villain from the manga who makes a cameo in the movie leading Raoh's march with a megaphone) crushes the head of a chanter with his bare hands.

Discotek Media released the film on Region 1 DVD in May 2009, based on the high definition video transfer produced by Toei for the previous year's Japanese DVD release. It features both, the original Japanese dialogue and the English dub, as well as most of the extra features except for the revised ending. Because the video transfer is the same one used by the Japanese version, the text used for the title, intertitles and credits, are in Japanese, even though these were previously changed for the VHS release of the English dub. The first-print run of the DVD featured several translation mistakes on the subtitles. Later prints of the DVD (which used a different cover artwork) contain corrected subtitles.

== Reception ==
The English dub version of the movie was released two years after Viz Communications' short-lived first translation of the manga, and received mixed reviews. Upon release, Richard Harrington of The Washington Post criticized the violent nature of the movie and quality of the animation, saying that "watching it you will feel as comfortable as a hemophiliac in a razor blade factory". Stephen Holden of The New York Times wrote that "in its carelessly translated and poorly dubbed English adaptation, the characters express themselves in diction so stiff that they seem ludicrously prissy". In 2005, a review from Akemi's Anime World called it "so bad it's good, and the original in the genre" and calls quality of the dub "cheesy", but "suitable".

The 1996 movie guide "Seen That, Now What?", the animated film was given the rating of "C", in which it is described as having a good story and impressive post-apocalyptic background scenery, being offset by stiff character animation and excessively gory violence.

American Wrestler John Cena has said that Fist of the North Star is his favourite anime movie.
