= This World Alone =

2018 film by Jordan Noel

- Poster
- Directed by: Jordan Noel
- Written by: Hudson Phillips
- Produced by: Terri Measel Adams; Hudson Phillips
- Starring: Belle Adams; Lau'rie Roach; Carrie Walrond Hood; Sophie Edwards; Brandon O'Dell
- Cinematography: Trisha Solyn
- Edited by: Jordan Noel
- Music by: Wil Wright
- Production company: Brothers Ray Productions
- Distributed by: 1091 Pictures
- Release dates: October 2018 (Rome Film Festival); May 18, 2021
- Running time: 90 minutes
- Country: United States
- Language: English
- Budget: $30,000

This World Alone is a 2018 science fiction drama film directed by Jordan Noel and written by Hudson Phillips. The film stars Belle Adams, Lau'rie Roach, Carrie Walrond Hood, Sophie Edwards, and Brandon O'Dell.

== Plot ==
Three women are forced to survive once a cataclysmic event wipes out power all over the world.

== Cast ==
- Belle Adams as Sam
- Lau'rie Roach as Dart
- Carrie Walrond Hood as Connie
- Sophie Edwards as Willow
- Brandon O'Dell as Levi

== Production ==
Principal photography of the film was shot over ten days for $30,000 in Hiawassee, Georgia.

== Release ==
This World Alone premiered at Rome Film Festival in 2018, screened at Phoenix Film Festival in 2019 and released on May 18, 2021. It was distributed by 1091 Pictures.

== Reception ==
Elisabeth Vincentelli at The New York Times said the film is "quietly thought-provoking." Trent Neely at Battle Royale With Cheese claims it has "some new perspectives in the post-apocalyptic genre." In a review at Moviejawn, Audrey Callerstrom said the ending falls apart and that the script and characters could be more polished. Jessica Baxter at Hammer to Nail mentioned that the film is excellent, but that the tone of the film drags. Film critic Dennis Schwartz gave the film a C+, stating "it needed more of something urgent to get me along for the journey." Rachel Willis at UK Film Review gave it two stars, claiming the score and cinematography are the highlights. The film won Best Narrative Feature at Oxford Film Festival in 2019.
