= List of Fist of the North Star episodes =

One of the DVD book covers used in the 2008 HD remaster set of Fist of the North Star

The Fist of the North Star manga by Buronson and Tetsuo Hara was adapted into two animated television series produced by Toei Animation. The original series, simply titled Hokuto no Ken (北斗の拳), lasted 109 episodes, which aired on Fuji TV from October 11, 1984, to March 5, 1987, adapting the first 136 chapters of the original manga. A sequel series, Hokuto no Ken 2, took over the previous series' time slot and lasted 43 episodes, airing from March 12, 1987, to February 18, 1988, which adapts chapters 137 to 210 (the final chapters of the manga were not adapted).

== Fist of the North Star ==
=== Part 1 ===
No.	Title	Original release date
1	"God or Devil?! - The Mightiest Man Who Appeared in Hell! / God or Devil!? The Mightiest Man Appears in Hell."; Transliteration: "Kami ka Akuma ka!? Jigoku ni arawareta saikyō no otoko" (Japanese: 神か悪魔か!? 地獄にあらわれた最強の男)	October 11, 1984
After a long time travelling through the desert, Kenshiro is taken prisoner while wandering into a village looking for water. There, he shares a cell with a young thief named Bat, and befriends an orphaned girl named Lin, who was assigned as his cell guard. Shortly afterwards, a biker gang attacks the village and their leader, Zeed, takes Lin hostage. Ken breaks out of his cell and kills Zeed using the Hokuto Hyakuretsu Ken technique, rescuing Lin. As Ken leaves the village, Bat decides to follow him as his self-appointed sidekick, while Lin stays behind. The elder of the village tells Lin that, wherever Hokuto Shinken goes, chaos follows.
2	"The Deadly Fist of Lingering Regret! - The Future Is Sighted in the Barren Desert! / The Fist of Lingering Regret and Certain Death!! The Future Is Sighted in the Barren Wasteland!!"; Transliteration: "Hissatsu Zankai Ken!! Fumō no Kōya ni ashita o mita!!" (Japanese: 必殺残悔拳!! 不毛の荒野に明日をみた!!)	October 18, 1984
Kenshiro rescues an elderly farmer named Smith from Spade, a member of the Four Jacks under the employ of a mysterious warlord known only as King. The old man seeks to deliver a bag of rice seeds to his village, hoping to harvest them for the future. Ken and Bat take Smith back to his village, unaware that Spade and his men are following them. Spade, having lost his eye during his initial encounter with Ken, attacks the village and kills Smith in retaliation. Enraged by Smith's death, Ken kills Spade with the Hokuto Zankaiken technique, which gives its victims seven seconds to repent their sins before dying a gruesome death. After the battle, Ken plants Smith's seeds over his grave.
3	"In a City Without Light, a Lone Fist Burns! - Furious Death of the Five Exploding Fingers! / In the City Without Light, a Lone Fist Burns! The Furious Death by the Five Exploding Fingers."; Transliteration: "Hikari-naki machi ni koken ga moeta! Bakusatsu Goshi Retsudan" (Japanese: 光なき街に孤拳が燃えた! 爆殺五指烈弾)	October 25, 1984
Bat spots Lin in a truck full of captive villagers being taken to the town of Dorado, which is occupied by members of King's organization. While in Dorado, Kenshiro encounters two of the remaining Four Jacks, Diamond and Club, who are torturing and killing the villagers for fun. Ken uses the power of Hokuto Shinken to destroy them both and, with Bat's help, is reunited with Lin.
4	"The Bloody Cross Attacks! - Secret Technique, Death by Soft Strikes! / Attack the Bloody Cross! The Secret Technique, Death by Soft Strikes."; Transliteration: "Braddi Kurosu o ute!! Hiken Jūhazan" (Japanese: ブラッディクロスを撃て!! 秘拳•柔破斬)	November 1, 1984
Kenshiro learns that the other prisoners transported with Lin are being held in a separate prison camp in a nearby valley. Ken manages to break the imprisoned villagers free, but they are all killed in an ambush led by Mr. Heart, the last of the Four Jacks. While Mr. Heart's excess flesh proves resistant to his attacks, Ken eventually uses the Hokuto Juhazan technique, which allows him to overcome Mr. Heart's defenses and strike one of his pressure points. From his battle with Mr. Heart, Ken deduces the true identity of King.
5	"Can the Flames of Love Burn in Hell? - You Are Already Dead!! / Can the Flames of Love Burn in Hell? You Don't Even Know You're Already Dead!!"; Transliteration: "Jigoku ni saku ka ai no honō. Omae wa mō shindeiru!!" (Japanese: 地獄に咲くか愛の炎•おまえはもう死んでいる!!)	November 8, 1984
Having learned that King is none other than his old nemesis Shin, a master of the Nanto Seiken style, Kenshiro remembers how a year ago, Shin defeated him in combat, engraved the seven scars on his chest and took his fiancée Yuria, who agreed to live with Shin under the condition that Ken's life would be spared. Ken arrives at a castle where Shin was said to be staying, but Shin has already left for his new capital city, Southern Cross. Ken only finds Shin's right-hand man Joker, who sets the castle ablaze with Ken inside, but Ken manages to escape, swearing to find Shin and take Yuria back.
6	"Search Order from Satan - Find the Man with the Seven Scars! / The Devil's Hit List. Find the Man with the 7 Scars!"; Transliteration: "Akuma no tehaisho. Nanatsu no kizu no otoko o nerae!" (Japanese: 悪魔の手配書 七つの傷の男を狙え!)	November 15, 1984
Kenshiro, Bat and Lin arrive at an oasis city under the rule of God's Army, a fanatical military group composed of former special forces members. Ken has a bounty placed on his head after he kills one of the group's security officers in a fight.
7	"Villains! - Shall We Have a Countdown to Death? / Villains! How About Counting Down to Your Own Death?!"; Transliteration: "Akutō domo! Shi e no Byōyomi yatte miru kai" (Japanese: 悪党ども! 死への秒よみやってみるかい)	November 22, 1984
God's Army conducts a full-scale manhunt for Kenshiro. When the search team starts executing innocent bystanders at random to lure him out, Ken allows himself to be captured in order to infiltrate their training facility. There, he faces and defeats the army's drill instructor, Sergeant Mad.
8	"Strike the Hidden Power Point! - No Requiem for the Wicked! / Strike the Hidden Power Point! There's No Requiem for the Wicked."; Transliteration: "Keiraku Hikō o tsuke! Akutō domo ni chinkonka wa nai" (Japanese: 経絡秘孔を突け! 悪党どもに鎮魂歌はない)	November 29, 1984
Kenshiro penetrates the headquarters of God's Army and confronts their leader, the Colonel, a deluded follower of Shin who has mastered a Nanto Seiken style known as Nanto Muonken. However, he proves to be no match for the power of Hokuto Shinken, and Ken ultimately kills him by hitting a pressure point that causes the Colonel's skeleton to explode out of his body.
9	"Villains! - Say Your Prayers Before You Die! / Villains! Finish Your Prayers Before You Die!"; Transliteration: "Akutō domo! Shinumae ni inori wo sumasero!!" (Japanese: 悪党ども! 死ぬ前に祈りをすませろ!!)	December 6, 1984
Kenshiro and his friends arrive at a village where the young men and women are being offered as slaves to Madam Patra, an evil sorceress who controls the village's water supply from her fortified castle. After defeating her bodyguards, Ken confronts her, but she disappears in a blinding flash of light. When Ken explores behind the castle, he discovers that the lake has completely dried up.
10	"The Raging Flame Reverse Flow Punch! - There Are Too Many Who Must Die! / Inverse Raging Fire Punch! There Are Too Many Who Deserve To Die!!"; Transliteration: "Rekka Gyakuryūken! Shisubeki Yatsura ga Ōsugiru!!" (Japanese: 烈火逆流拳! 死すべき奴が多すぎる!!)	December 13, 1984
Kenshiro follows the dried-up river bed and ventures into Patra's lair at Dragon God Mountain to save the young villagers. There he faces Patra's partner, Drago, a fire breather with the power of Nanto Ryujinken (South Star Dragon God Fist) who attempts to coerce Ken to his side, but he refuses. Ken tricks Drago into killing Patra and then causes Drago's throat to constrict, consuming him in his own flames. Drago and his castle burn to the ground and the villagers are freed.
11	"Villains! - Listen to the Blues of Hell! / Villains!! Listen to the Blues of Hell!!"; Transliteration: "Akutō domo!! Jigoku no Burūsu o kike!!" (Japanese: 悪党ども!! 地獄のブルースを聞け!!)	December 20, 1984
Kenshiro and his companions meet Taki, an old friend of Bat's. Taki takes them to his home village where Auntie Toyo, an elderly woman who takes care of orphaned and abandoned children, is trying to dig a well. However, the Warriors biker gang led by Jackal have trailed Ken and his friends, waiting for the opportunity to claim Toyo's village as their new turf.
12	"I Am Death! I'll Chase You to the Ends of Hell! / I Am Death Itself!! I'll Chase You to the Ends of Hell!!"; Transliteration: "Ore wa Shinigami!! Jigoku no Hate made Oitsumete yaru!!" (Japanese: 俺は死神!! 地獄の果まで追いつめてやる!!)	January 10, 1985
After Toyo is murdered by Jackal, Kenshiro leaves Bat and Lin to watch over Toyo's orphans while he pursues Jackal and the Warriors. While searching for clues to Jackal's destination, Ken encounters Fox, Jackal's right-hand man, but Ken outwits and kills him. Ken finally catches up to Jackal, but before Ken can kill him, he is rescued by Joker.
13	"Rakan Nioh Ken! - Once Unleashed, There's No Holding Back! / Arhat Deva Fist! Once Released There's No Stopping It!!"; Transliteration: "Rakan Niōken! Ugokidashitara mō tomaranai!!" (Japanese: 羅漢仁王拳! 動きだしたらもう止まらない!!)	January 17, 1985
Kenshiro chases Jackal to the ruins of Villainy Prison, where only the most vicious of criminals are imprisoned. Hoping to defeat Ken, Jackal releases Devil's Rebirth, a gigantic demon-like killer who has mastered the forbidden art of Rakan Niohken (Arhat Deva Fist). Jackal dupes him by pretending to be Devil's brother and tricks him into believing that Ken was responsible for his imprisonment, but Ken defeats the giant and then uses one of Jackal's own sticks of dynamite to destroy them both.
14	"A Miserable Age! - Good People Die So Young! / A Miserable Era! The Good Die So Young!!"; Transliteration: "Fukō na judai da! Zennin hodo hayajini suru!!" (Japanese: 不幸な時代だ! 善人ほど早死にする!!)	January 24, 1985
Kenshiro and his friends visit a village where the local doctor, Duran, offers his hospitality. However, Duran is a former member of a group of bandits who have been dispatched by Shin to hunt down Ken. Their leader, Dante, blackmails Duran into killing Ken under threat of divulging Duran's shady past to the villagers. Duran attempts to kill Ken at the edge of an active volcano, but fails, and is murdered by Dante and his men when he tries to protect a young girl. An enraged Ken kills Dante's men in retaliation and, when Dante tries to use his Nanto Hyakuzanken (South Star Hundred Slash Fist) style against him, overpowers the villain and forces him to walk straight into the volcanic magma.
15	"Count to Three! - You're the One Who'll Die! / Try Counting to Three! You're the One To Die!!"; Transliteration: "Mittsu kazoete miro! Shinu no wa omae da!!" (Japanese: 3つ数えてみろ! 死ぬのはお前だ!!)	January 31, 1985
Kenshiro and his friends arrive in a city that is being controlled by an insane priest called Zaria. Under orders from Shin to kill Ken and his friends, Zaria uses his strange hypnosis technique involving the city's cathedral bell to turn the villagers into mind-controlled zombies. Zaria kidnaps Lin and forces Ken to fight his way into the cathedral where she is being held captive. Zaria hypnotizes Ken and re-animates his dead fighters. However, tears from Lin fall on Ken, breaking the spell. Ken then destroys Zaria and the bell, freeing the city's inhabitants.
16	"Try To Sing Villains! - The Counting Rhyme of Hell! / Sing for Me, Villains! The Counting Rhymes of Hell!"; Transliteration: "Akutō domo utatte miru ka! Jigoku no kazoe uta!!" (Japanese: 悪党ども歌ってみるか! 地獄の数え唄!!)	February 7, 1985
Kenshiro and his friends find themselves caught in the middle of a turf war between two rival gangs, the Scorpions led by Baron and the Snakes led by Junk. Joker orders them to unite and kill Ken, but Baron instead tries to recruit Ken to his side. However, Ken refuses to support Baron as the two gangs fight it out. Eventually, after both sides almost wipe each other out, Ken kills the remaining gang members and uses a technique that forces the two gang leaders to embrace each other before their bodies explode.
17	"Battle Makes a Man! - The Gates of Confrontation Have Opened / A Man Lives to Fight! The Door to the Showdown Finally Opens!"; Transliteration: "Tatakaeba koso otoko! Taiketsu no mon wa tsui ni hirakareta!" (Japanese: 戦えばこそ男! 対決の門は遂に開かれた!)	February 14, 1985
Shin gathers his entire army for a meeting as he officially declares war against Kenshiro. Barcom, the General of Shin's army, tells his men how Ken defeated some of Shin's best fighters. Meanwhile, Yuria recounts to her young maid Saki about how she became Shin's captive and his subsequent rise to power.
18	"Life or Death! - At the End of the Wilderness Lies the First Street of Hell! / Life or Death?! Beyond the Wasteland Lies the First Circle of Hell!"; Transliteration: "Sei ka shi ka!? Kōya no hate wa jigoku no itchōme!!" (Japanese: 生か死か!? 荒野の果ては地獄の一丁目!!)	February 21, 1985
Kenshiro and his friends encounter Jennifer, a female motorcyclist. Bat helps repair her motorcycle and she invites them to her hometown of Jina. However, Shin's Demolition Corps and Speed Racers find Ken's location and begin to destroy the town. Ken reveals himself and kills the Demolition Corps' leader Wolf, but the Speed Racers abduct Bat and Lin during the battle. Ken defeats them and rescues Bat and Lin, but the Speed Racers' leader Goras then uses a tank to attack them. Ken destroys the tank with a series of powerful punches and kicks, killing Goras. Meanwhile at Southern Cross, Yuria unsuccessfully attempts to escape with Saki's help.
19	"Villains! - Ready Your One-Way Tickets to Death / Villains! Have Your One-Way Tickets to Death Ready!"; Transliteration: "Akutō domo! Shi e no katamichi kippu o yōi shiro!!" (Japanese: 悪党ども! 死への片道切符を用意しろ!!)	February 28, 1985
Kenshiro and his friends are ambushed in the desert by the airborne Blackbirds commanded by Mahari and the Gold Wolf forces led by Garekki. In Southern Cross, Saki's elder brother, Temjina, is punished because Saki helped Yuria, but later escapes to tell Ken of its location. Mahari and the Blackbirds attack Ken and his friends while Garekki and the Gold Wolf forces prepares to attack Jina, but stop for a 3-hour lunch break. Ken eventually destroys the Blackbirds and the Gold Wolf forces, killing both Mahari and Garekki. Temjina finally arrives to give Ken clues to the location of Southern Cross and Yuria just before he dies from injuries inflicted by Shin's men.
20	"A Nightmarish Full-Scale War! - My Fists Pack One Million Volts! / A Nightmarish All-Out Battle! My Fist Is 1 Million Volts!"; Transliteration: "Akumu no sōryokusen! Ore no kobushi wa hyaku-man boruto!!" (Japanese: 悪夢の総力戦! 俺の拳は100万ボルト!!)	March 7, 1985
Kenshiro proceeds towards Southern Cross with his companions and Jennifer. They encounter Commander Hidora and his Armed Buggy Force, but manage to wipe them out and continue on their way. Shin receives news that they are getting closer and sends out the South Star Cannon Train commanded by Tohda. Jennifer rides out to intercept the train, but is killed by a cannon blast. A furious Kenshiro then attacks and commandeers the train, driving towards Tohda's base, a battleship stranded in the desert. Kenshiro crashes the train into the battleship and kills Tohda. However, General Barcom and his airborne forces arrive and bombard the battleship. He then reports to Shin that Kenshiro has been killed.
21	"The Palace of Evil in Flames! - Shin! Only One More Step to You Now! / The Evil Palace in Flames! Just One More Step to Reach You, Shin!"; Transliteration: "Makyū enjō! Shin! Omae made ato ippo da!!" (Japanese: 魔宮炎上! シン! お前まであと一歩だ!!)	March 14, 1985
With Kenshiro presumed dead, General Barcom leads a mutiny against Shin, seeking to take all of Shin's territory for himself. In the desert, Joker searches the wreckage of the battleship for Ken's body, unconvinced that he is actually dead. Ken emerges from the wreckage and Joker challenges him, but Ken is too powerful and kills him. Meanwhile in Southern Cross, Shin defeats and kills Barcom. However, chaos ensues and the various gangs fight among themselves, causing the destruction of the city.
22	"Conclusion of Chapter One - Julia Forever... As Well as Shin! / Conclusion of Part One: Yuria, Forever... and Shin!"; Transliteration: "Dai-ichi-bu kanketsu - Yuria towa ni.... Soshite Shin yo!" (Japanese: 第一部完結 - ユリア永遠に...• そしてシンよ!)	March 21, 1985
With Southern Cross left in ruins following Barcom's mutiny, Shin is left alone in his palace, protected by the few followers still loyal to him. Kenshiro confronts Shin for the first time in a year and, despite Shin's best efforts, is able to defeat him in their rematch. However, he then learns that Yuria killed herself in an attempt to end Shin's obsessive compulsion with continuing his destructive path in order to win her heart. Shin then commits suicide by jumping off the roof of his palace, refusing to die from Kenshiro's technique. Ken reunites with Bat and Lin and buries his former friend, ending a major chapter in his life.

=== Part 2 ===
No.	Title	Original release date
23	"Chapter Two: Stormy Times, Titanic Battles - Is Battle All That Awaits Me?! / Part Two: The Tumultuous Dragon and Tiger! Are Battles All That Await Me?!"; Transliteration: "Dai-ni-bu Fū-un Ryūko Hen Ore o matsu no wa tatakai dake na no ka!!" (Japanese: 第二部風雲龍虎編 俺を待つのは戦いだけなのか!!)	March 28, 1985
Kenshiro rescues some villagers who are being chased by the vicious Fang Clan. He becomes the guardian of their village after he meets their female leader Mamiya, who bears a striking resemblance to Yuria. Elsewhere, a man named Rei, master of the Nanto Suichōken (South Star Waterbird Fist) style, is killing bandits while seeking the Man with the Seven Scars.
24	"Nanto Suichoken! - The Tragedy of the Mighty Begins! / South Star Waterfowl Fist! The Tragedy of the Men Who Grew Too Strong Has Begun!!"; Transliteration: "Nanto Suichōken! Tsuyosugita otoko-tachi no higeki ga hajimatta!!" (Japanese: 南斗水鳥拳! 強すぎた男たちの悲劇が始まった!!)	April 4, 1985
Rei is hired by the Fang Clan to infiltrate Mamiya's village as a spy, where he meets Kenshiro and his friends. However, drawn by Mamiya's charms, he switches sides and becomes the village's other new guardian. Ken and Rei both later realize that they are masters of opposing styles. Meanwhile, the leader of the Fang Clan seeks revenge for those who have been killed.
25	"Sinners! - Thy Name Is Fang! / Sinners! Thy Name Is Fang Clan!"; Transliteration: "Tsumibukaki monodomo! Sono na wa Kiba Ichizoku!!" (Japanese: 罪深き者ども! その名は牙一族!)	April 11, 1985
Mamiya's younger brother Kō is captured by the Fang Clan while collecting strawberries for Mamiya's birthday cake. After he is publicly executed outside the village gates, Kenshiro and Rei set out separately to punish those responsible. They meet a group of Fang Clan members and, after they kill them all, Rei reveals that he is searching for the Man with the Seven Scars, whom he believes killed his family and abducted his sister Airi.
26	"Tremble & Die! - Villains of Night Fog Valley! / Tremble as You Sleep, Villains in the Valley of Night Fog!!"; Transliteration: "Furuete nemure! Yogiri no tani no akutōdomo!!" (Japanese: 震えて眠れ! 夜霧の谷の悪党ども!!)	April 18, 1985
Boss Fang, the leader of the Fang Clan, swears revenge against the killers of his men. Gibara seeks revenge for his slain brother Kemada while Boss Fang orders his right-hand man Gojiba to find information on Kenshiro and Rei's families. Meanwhile, Ken, Rei and Mamiya venture into Night Fog Valley in order to confront the Fang Clan in their hideout. After he learns about Rei's sister Airi, Boss Fang abducts her from another group of bandits.
27	"Only Villains Can Smile! - How I Hate This Age! / Only the Evil Smile! I Can't Stand This Age!!"; Transliteration: "Akutō dake ga waratte iru! Konna jidai ga ki ni iranē!!" (Japanese: 悪党だけが笑っている! こんな時代が気にいらねえ!!)	April 25, 1985
Gojiba leads the Fang Clan on a raid to another village and abduct the young people, but their clan beast, Madara, goes wild and has to be subdued. Back at Boss Fang's lair, the hostages are sacrificed to serve the dead clan members in their next life. Kenshiro, Rei and Mamiya arrive and are challenged by Madara, but Ken defeats him. Boss Fang then reveals that he has Airi, Rei's long-lost sister, but Airi doesn't recognize him until he gives her the wedding veil he has carried with him for years.
28	"Rei, I'll Wipe Your Tears Away with My Fists! / Rei! I'll Stop Your Tears with My Fist!!"; Transliteration: "Rei! Omae no namida wa ore no kobushi de ukete yaru!!" (Japanese: レイ! お前の涙は俺の拳で受けてやる!!)	May 2, 1985
Mamiya pretends to be Kenshiro's fiancée and allows herself to be captured by Boss Fang under the condition that he releases Airi. However, Boss Fang does not keep his side of the bargain and forces Ken and Rei to fight each other to the death for the safety of the women. Although they appear to kill each other, they both survive and prepare to challenge Boss Fang.
29	"It's Too Late to Beg for Mercy! - To Hell with You, Boss Fang! / It's Too Late to Beg for Mercy! Go to Hell, Boss Fang!"; Transliteration: "Inochigoi wa ososugiru! Jigoku e ochiro Kiba Daiō!!" (Japanese: 命ごいは遅すぎる! 地獄へ落ちろ牙大王!!)	May 16, 1985
After Kenshiro and Rei rescue the two women, Boss Fang sets off a series of explosions, separating them and threatening to kill the women. However, Ken and Rei defeat the Fang Clan and rescue the women. After returning to Mamiya's village, Ken restores Airi's eyesight and she reveals that the man who kidnapped her wore a metal helmet. Elsewhere, a vicious gang leader with seven scars on his chest is terrorizing a village, claiming to be Kenshiro.
30	"Destiny Draws Near! - Jagi, Who Are You? / Destiny Looms Near! Who Are You, Jagi?!"; Transliteration: "Shukumei wa shinobiyoru! Jagi omae wa nanimono!!" (Japanese: 宿命はしのびよる! ジャギお前は何者!!)	May 30, 1985
Kenshiro suspects that the man with the helmet is one of his Hokuto Shinken brothers and leaves the village to find him. Ken then learns that Jagi, a former brother-in-training, is trying to tarnish his reputation. In a flashback, Ken and Jagi are shown competing to be the Hokuto Shinken successor. Ken tracks Jagi down to the village where he is committing numerous heinous acts and prepares to confront him.
31	"The Hellish Iron Mask! - He Who Terrorizes in the Name of the North Star!! / The Iron Mask of Hell! The Fiend Who Calls Himself North Star!!"; Transliteration: "Jigoku no tekkamen! Hokuto o nanoru kyōaku naru mono yo!!" (Japanese: 地獄の鉄仮面! 北斗を名のる凶悪なる者よ!!)	June 6, 1985
Jagi separates a pair of young brothers from each other as a punishment. The younger brother, Aki, is chained to a giant rock and forced to walk into the desert, while the elder one, Mako, is programmed by a Hokuto Shinken technique to kill Kenshiro. Ken comes across Aki and takes him back home, where he frees Mako from Jagi's control. Ken then heads for Jagi's headquarters, where Jagi has just killed one of his own men for seeing his disfigured face.
32	"The Four Linked Fists of Rage! - Jagi! I'll Wait for You in Hell!!! / Four Linked Punches of Fury! Wait for Me in Hell, Jagi!!"; Transliteration: "Doken yonrendan! Jagi jigoku de matte iro!!" (Japanese: 怒拳四連弾! ジャギ地獄で待っていろ!!)	June 13, 1985
Kenshiro comes face-to-face with Jagi in his hideout. Jagi reveals that he's been trying to tarnish Ken's reputation by committing heinous crimes while pretending to be him in retaliation for an earlier altercation between the two that ended with the disfigurement of Jagi's face. In combat, Jagi tries all sorts of underhanded tricks to gain leverage against Kenshiro, but Kenshiro overcomes all of them. During the midst of battle, Jagi reveals that he was the one who convinced Kenshiro's former friend Shin to betray him and steal Yuria away. Angry at this revelation, Kenshiro unleashes an ultimate technique which puts an end to Jagi once and for all.
33	"This Is the Village of Miracles! - A Fallen Angel Has Descended!! / This Is the Village of Miracles! A Fallen Angel Has Arrived!!"; Transliteration: "Koko ga kiseki no mura! Datenshi wa maiorita!!" (Japanese: ここが奇跡の村! 堕天使は舞い降りた!!)	June 27, 1985
Although Jagi is now dead, Kenshiro continues his journey, having learned that his other two brothers who trained in the ways of Hokuto Shinken have also survived the apocalypse. He hears rumors that one of them, Toki, a once-benevolent healer who sought to use Hokuto Shinken as a healing art, is now using his skills to experiment on people and create monsters in the Village of Miracles. On his way, he is attacked by three beast-men whom he defeats, the last telling him that it was Toki who made him that way. Meanwhile, Lin leaves the village to find Ken and becomes lost in a sandstorm. Bat, Rei and Mamiya leave to search for her.
34	"Toki! - Are You an Angel or a Devil?! / Toki! Are You Angel or Devil?!"; Transliteration: "Toki yo! Omae wa tenshi na no ka akuma na no ka!!" (Japanese: トキよ! お前は天使なのか悪魔なのか!!)	July 4, 1985
Kenshiro confronts a group of people-hunters who were physically modified through pressure point experiments conducted on them by Toki. He defeats several groups and continues on his way with Mr. Hobb, a little old man and leader of a group of hunters. Meanwhile, as Bat, Rei and Mamiya leave to search for Lin, she is found by a group of nomads and begins travelling with them.
35	"Fiend! - Toki, Your Heart Is Rotten to the Core!! / Evil One! Toki, Your Heart Has Been Corrupted!!"; Transliteration: "Jaaku naru mono yo! Toki omae no kokoro wa kusatte iru!!" (Japanese: 邪悪なる者よ! トキ•お前の心は腐っている!!)	July 11, 1985
One of the nomad children falls ill and they decide to take him to the Village of Miracles to be cured, and Lin goes with them. They meet Toki, who, although he saves the boy, plans to use his parents for his experiments. Kenshiro reaches the Village of Miracles and confronts Toki. However, Ken is unconvinced that his adversary is the real Toki until he reveals the scar on his back - a scar Toki received while rescuing a young Ken in the past.
36	"I Have No Past to Look Back On! - Just My Hatred for Evil That Will Destroy Toki! / There Is No Looking Back! Only Hating Evil, and Striking Toki Down!!"; Transliteration: "Furikaeru kako wa nai! Tada aku o nikumi Toki o utsu!!" (Japanese: ふりかえる過去はない! ただ悪を憎みトキを撃つ!!)	July 18, 1985
Kenshiro attacks Toki, who is surprised by his speed and power, but still manages to immobilize Ken. Fortunately, Rei and Mamiya arrive to help Ken, revealing that the man Ken is fighting is not the real Toki, but an impostor named Amiba, a jealous rival who sought to destroy Toki's reputation. Amiba gloats that he is a genius and has imprisoned Toki, but Ken defeats him with a Hokuto Shinken technique that forces him to walk off the roof of his fortress. Before he dies, Amiba reveals that he was following orders from a man known as "Ken-Oh".
37	"Instead, I Shall Reject Love! For I Bear the Cursed Star of Death!!"; Transliteration: "Aete ai o kobamu! Shi o yobu kyōsei o seou ga yue ni....!!" (Japanese: あえて愛を拒む! 死を呼ぶ凶星を背負うがゆえに...•!!)	July 25, 1985
Kenshiro tells the others about the sacrifice Toki made to save him and Yuria, and why he must find him. Mamiya seeks clues to the real Toki's whereabouts and learns that he is imprisoned in the Dungeon of Cassandra, the City of Wailing Demons. Ken sets off, followed by Mamiya. Meanwhile, Uighur, the Warden of Cassandra, learns of Ken's approach.
38	"Crimson Fist of Lotus Mountain! A Tragic Woman Born of the Times!!"; Transliteration: "Ranzan Kurenaiken! Jidai wa kanashii onna o unda!!" (Japanese: 蘭山紅拳! 時代は悲しい女を生んだ!!)	August 1, 1985
Uighur, the Warden of Cassandra, adds to Ken-Oh's martial arts collection by imprisoning a man with a secret scroll and his family. Meanwhile, Kenshiro's group are attacked by the Cassandra Assault Squad on their approach. Uighur then blackmails a female prisoner named Bella, the successor of the Ranzan Kurenaiken (Crimson Orchid Mountain Fist) style, to kill Ken under the watchful gaze of Targel. Ken defeats Bella, but spares her life, causing Targel to kill her mother as punishment for her failure. Bella challenges Targel, but she is no match for his Kokushō Jūjiken (Black Palm Cross Fist) style and dies. Ken and his companions double back to avenge Bella, killing the guards and Targel. News of Targel's defeat reaches Cassandra and Uighur.
39	"A Wicked Legacy! The Gates to Cassandra Open Now!"; Transliteration: "Kyōaku no Densetsu! Kasandora no mon ga ima hirakareru!!" (Japanese: 凶悪の伝説! カサンドラの門がいま開かれる!!)	August 8, 1985
Raiga and Fuga, the twin giant successors of the Nishin Fūraiken (Dual Gods of Wind and Thunder Fist) style, are the gatekeepers of Cassandra. After years of destroying anyone trying to enter without permission, they decide to quit, but the merciless warden Uighur forces them to continue. Beaten by Kenshiro, they decide to join him to free Cassandra from the iron fist of Uighur, even at the cost of the life of their brother-at-arms, Mitsu. They break open the giant doors of Cassandra, and Ken finally faces off against Uighur.
40	"Villains Need No Graves! This Is the Hellish Cassandra!!"; Transliteration: "Akudōdomo ni bohyō wa iranu! Koko wa jigoku no Kasandora!!" (Japanese: 悪党どもに墓標はいらぬ! ここは地獄のカサンドラ!!)	August 15, 1985
Kenshiro challenges Uighur, the Warden of Cassandra, in the prison's courtyard. Uighur attacks Ken with his Taizan-ryū Sōjōben (Mount Tai Twin Streak Whips) style, but Ken ties them in knots. Uighur then immobilizes Ken with his Taizan-ryū Senjōben (Mount Tai Thousand Streak Whips) attack and knocks him into the graveyard. Apparently beaten, Ken recovers and defeats Uighur, knocking him into the grave prepared for Ken. With Uighur dead, Cassandra, the City of Wailing Demons, falls silent.
41	"The North Star's 2,000-Year Tragedy! I Can Hear the Fist King's Footsteps!!"; Transliteration: "Hokuto nisennen no higeki! Ken-Ō no ashioto ga kikoeru!!" (Japanese: 北斗二千年の悲劇! 拳王の足音が聞こえる!!)	August 22, 1985
While awaiting Kenshiro's return, Bat and Lin reminisce about their adventures with Ken and the people they met up until this point. Meanwhile, Ken-Oh's royal guards arrive at Cassandra to regain control of the prison.
42	"A Century's End with No Tomorrow! I've Been Waiting for You, Ken!!"; Transliteration: "Asu naki seikimatsu! Ken omae o matte ita!!" (Japanese: 明日なき世紀末! ケンおまえを待っていた!!)	September 5, 1985
With Raiga and Fuga supporting Kenshiro, whom they call their savior, the prisoners join the revolt, but Ken-Oh's royal guards arrive to restore order. Ken defies them, and this time the prisoners and guards attack the royal guards while Ken and his allies fight their way into Cassandra to find Toki. Raiga and Fuga become trapped by royal guards and are then confronted by their Nishin Fūraiken master, Sohjin. They declare that it is their destiny to fight their master, and they manage to kill him. Ken, Rei and Mamiya go to Toki's cell and encounter the royal guards Zarqa and Kashim. After killing them both, they eventually reach Toki.
43	"Cassandra Collapses! The North Star's Mythology Is Painted Anew!!"; Transliteration: "Kasandora hōkai! Hokuto no shinwa wa nurikaerareta!!" (Japanese: カサンドラ崩壊! 北斗の神話はぬりかえられた!!)	September 12, 1985
Kenshiro finally finds Toki, waiting for him at the top of the tower, but he is suffering from terminal radiation sickness due to having made a great sacrifice to save Ken and Yuria during the nuclear war. As they leave, the tower begins to collapse and they are attacked by Ken-Oh's suicide squad. Raiga and Fuga encounter Bulg, leader of Ken-Oh's suicide squad, and sacrifice their lives to allow Ken and his companions to escape before the tower collapses. Toki reveals that Ken-Oh is none other than the eldest of the four Hokuto Brothers, Raoh. As the group prepare to leave, their way is blocked by Bulg and the remainder of the suicide squad, but they are no match for Ken and the angry inmates of the prison.
44	"The Death Omen Star Shines! Fist King, Do You Control Even Death?!"; Transliteration: "Shichōsei kagayaku! Ken-Ō omae wa shi o mo tsukasadoru no ka!!" (Japanese: 死兆星輝く! 拳王お前は死をもつかさどるのか!!)	September 19, 1985
As Kenshiro and Rei travel together, Ken recalls his time competing for the Hokuto succession with Raoh. They come across a village devastated by Raoh's Assault Squad and learn they are headed for Mamiya's village, so Rei goes back to protect Airi and Lin. Toki reveals more about Ken's past to Mamiya. After she leaves, she is cornered by Raoh's reconnaissance squad, but is saved by Ken. Meanwhile, Raoh's invading army has started attacking Mamiya's village.
45	"Those Who Fear the Reaper! Listen to the Voice of Lin's Fiery Heart!"; Transliteration: "Shinigami ni obieru mono yo! Lin no atsuki kokoro no sakebi o kike!!" (Japanese: 死神におびえる者よ! リンの熱き心の叫びを聞け!!)	September 26, 1985
Raoh's invading army continues its attack on Mamiya's village, but Airi and Lin are saved from capture. Meanwhile, Kenshiro, Toki and Mamiya are attacked by Raoh's mobile bike squadron. After Ken defeats the squadron, they find a trail of huge hoof prints left by Raoh's horse, Kokuoh. On his way to the village, Rei finds Bat, who tells him of the attack on the village. Meanwhile, the invading army forces the villagers to swear allegiance to Ken-Oh by being branded, killing those who refuse. However, Lin is captured while hiding Airi and defies them, but is saved by the arrival of Rei before she can be sacrificed.
46	"Voices from Hell! Rei, Did You See the Death Omen Star?"; Transliteration: "Jigoku kara no yobigoe! Rei omae wa Shichōsei o mitaka!!" (Japanese: 地獄からの呼び声! レイお前は死兆星を見たか!!)	October 10, 1985
Rei fights the Assault Squad and confronts the leader of the invading army. Meanwhile, Kenshiro and Mamiya stop at a bar so that Toki can rest, but the inhabitants are members of Raoh's special forces. After defeating them, Ken goes on alone to catch up with Raoh. Back in the village, the Assault Squad try to capture Airi, but spurred on by Lin's courage, Airi gains the strength to fight for herself again. Rei goes on to defeat the invading leader, only to come face-to-face with none other than Raoh himself.
47	"The Nanto Dance of Death! I'll Give My Life for the Sake of Love!!"; Transliteration: "Nanto Suichōken shi no mai! Ai no tame ore no inochi kurete yarō!!" (Japanese: 南斗水鳥拳死の舞い! 愛のためオレの命くれてやろう!!)	October 17, 1985
Rei challenges Raoh, but he proves to be no match and is mortally wounded. Kenshiro, emboldened by Rei's sacrifice, challenges Raoh. The two brothers engage in a titanic battle, creating a tornado with their conflicting auras. However, their battle is interrupted when Rei fires an arrow at Raoh. Raoh then hits one of Rei's pressure points, Shinkesshu, and declares that Rei now only has three days to live before all of his blood haemorrhages out of his body. Meanwhile, Ken is weakened by a severe blow to his chest.
48	"An Explosion of Secret Techniques! BEYOND HATRED IS THE FATE FOR THE BROTHERS OF THE NORTH STAR."; Transliteration: "Ōgi bakuretsu! Hokuto nikyōdai no shukumei wa nikushimi o mo koeta!!" (Japanese: 奥義爆裂! 北斗二兄弟の宿命は憎しみをも越えた!!)	October 24, 1985
Raoh tries to defeat Kenshiro before Toki arrives, but Toki arrives at the village with Mamiya. He intervenes in Ken and Raoh's fight, revealing that Raoh was responsible for the death of their frail master and adoptive father, Ryuken. Believing that Ken is not ready to fight Raoh, he paralyzes Ken and challenges Raoh himself, advising Ken to learn from his technique of avoiding and deflecting direct attacks. However, Raoh pins their feet to the ground with a trident.
49	"The Greatest Battle in History, Raoh vs. Ken! YOU'RE THE ONE TO DIE!!"; Transliteration: "Shijō saikyō no tatakai Raō vs. Ken! Shinu no wa kisama da!!" (Japanese: 史上最強の戦い ラオウVSケン! 死ぬのはきさまだ!!)	October 31, 1985
Raoh uses his superior strength and power to overpower the ailing Toki at close range. Mamiya goes to intervene, but Rei stops her, saying that it will end in her death and that he loves her. She fires a crossbow bolt at Raoh, but Kenshiro manages to break free from Toki's paralysis and intercepts the arrow when it's returned by Raoh. Ken and Raoh fight again, with Raoh using techniques stolen from masters he imprisoned in Cassandra. They continue the fight to the point where they're both too wounded to continue and Toki separates them, the battle ending in a stalemate. Raoh's army desert him and he rides off on his black stallion Kokuoh.
50	"72 Hours To Live! The Death Omen Star Drags Rei In!!"; Transliteration: "Shi no senkoku 72 jikan! Shichōsei ga Rei o hikizuru!!" (Japanese: 死の宣告72時間! 死兆星がレイを引きずる!!)	November 7, 1985
As a result of the injuries Raoh inflicted upon him, Rei has only three days left to live and symptoms of disfigurement are already beginning to show. Mamiya ventures into Medicine City by herself to search for a medicine to ease Rei's pain. However, Galf, the ruthless, dog-loving Canine Master, rules the city. Mamiya finds the medicine store, but is captured by Galf. However, Kenshiro and Rei arrive to rescue her.
51	"Fate Without Tomorrow! And Yet, a Woman Believes in Love!!"; Transliteration: "Asu naki sadame! Sore de mo onna wa ai o shinjiru!!" (Japanese: 明日なき運命! それでも女は愛を信じる!!)	November 14, 1985
Kenshiro and Rei rescue Mamiya from Galf, but when she later tries to find the right medicine in the warehouse, she encounters Zorige, who throws balls of acid at her. Rei goes to Mamiya's aid and deals with Zorige, while Ken disposes of Galf. Later, Rei discovers a "UD" mark tattooed behind Mamiya's shoulder. This is the mark of Yuda, the self-described lover of strength and beauty.
52	"Yuda of the South Star Six Sacred Fists! I'm the Most Beautiful!!"; Transliteration: "Nanto Rokuseiken Yuda! Ore wa dare yori mo utsukushii!!" (Japanese: 南斗六聖拳ユダ! 俺は誰よりも美しい!!)	November 21, 1985
Yuda learns of Raoh's battle with Kenshiro and calculates what opportunities may present themselves for him. Ken and Rei learn from an elder that Mamiya was once kidnapped by Yuda, who also murdered her parents. Rei reveals that Yuda is in fact one of the Six Sacred Fists of Nanto, along with Rei and the deceased Shin. Ken and Rei go to Yuda's castle to confront him, but only find his vice-Commander, Dagar. Under pressure, Dagar says that Yuda has gone to the city of Blue Town.
53	"The Death Omen Star Looms! Rei! How Cruel Time Passes By!!"; Transliteration: "Shichōsei semaru!! Rei! Ten wa zankoku ni toki o kizamu!" (Japanese: 死兆星迫る!! レイ! 天は残酷に時を刻む!)	November 28, 1985
Dagar suffers in agony from the injuries inflicted on him by Kenshiro while Ken and Rei approach Blue Town. They are attacked by a young group of rebels, but their leader, Nova, asks for assistance in rescuing their female friends and family from Yuda. They free the women, but find that the "Yuda" at Blue Town is a decoy. The real Yuda is revealed to have been hiding in his castle all along, and he kills Dagar to implement his deception.
54	"Beloved Mamiya! The Death Omen Star Lurks Behind the Sparkle in Your Eyes!"; Transliteration: "Aisuru Mamiya! Sono hitomi no kagayaki ni Shichōsei ga hisomu!!" (Japanese: 愛するマミヤ! その瞳の輝きに死兆星がひそむ!!)	December 5, 1985
Kenshiro and Rei return to Mamiya's village, with Rei on the verge of death. Rei sees the Death Omen Star adjacent to the Big Dipper constellation of seven stars becoming brighter. To exact revenge against Rei, Yuda orders his agent Komak to lead a raid and abduct Mamiya. Meanwhile, Rei accepts Toki's offer to push a pressure point on his body that will increase his strength and extend his lifespan by one more day, but at the expense of enduring great pain that causes Rei's hair to turn white. Yuda's troops attack the village and the giant Goyan keeps Ken engaged while Mamiya is taken captive. However, Rei emerges even stronger than before and rescues her, although Mamiya reveals that she can also see the Death Omen Star.
55	"Rei, Are You on Your Way to Death? A Man Is Beautiful than Ever!!"; Transliteration: "Shiniyuku no ka Rei! Ima otoko wa koko made utsukushii!!" (Japanese: 死に行くのかレイ! 今•男はここまで美しい!!)	December 12, 1985
Yuda and his gang arrive at the village and again take Mamiya captive to force Rei into a match with him. Yuda reveals that he has harbored resentment towards Rei ever since they trained together, due to the fact that Rei's graceful Nanto Suichōken was more beautiful than Yuda's own Nanto Kōkakuken (South Star Crimson Crane Fist) style. Losing the fight, Yuda signals his men to destroy a nearby dam and flood the village, turning the ground beneath them to mud.
56	"Beautiful Warriors, Rei vs. Yuda! A Man's Passage Needs No Tears!"; Transliteration: "Utsukushiki kenshi Rei tai Yuda! Otoko no hanamichi ni namida wa iranu!!" (Japanese: 美しき拳士レイVSユダ! 男の花道に涙はいらぬ!!)	December 19, 1985
With Rei and Yuda's lower bodies stuck in mud and swirling water, Yuda has a slight advantage thanks to his upper-body style. Meanwhile, Kenshiro attacks Komak and the men who destroyed the dam, and stops the flow of water. Back in the village, as the water level drops, Rei overcomes and mortally wounds Yuda with his ultimate technique. Yuda accepts his defeat and recognizes Rei as a stronger and more beautiful man. Yuda dies in Rei's arms, but Rei does not have much more time left to live.
57	"End of Part Two: Farewell, Rei! Heroic Legend Will Be Told Throughout the Ages!"; Transliteration: "Saraba Rei! Jidai wa yūsha no densetsu o kataritsugu!!" (Japanese: さらばレイ! 時代は勇者の伝説を語り継ぐ!!)	December 26, 1985
In the last few moments of his life, Rei says goodbye to Mamiya and seeks seclusion in a cabin away from his sister and friends. He reminisces over his adventures with Kenshiro and his companions whilst awaiting death with dignity. He dies alone, screaming in agony. After Rei's death, Ken sets fire to the cabin with Rei's body still inside, cremating him and swearing to keep his legend alive.

=== Part 3 ===
No.	Title	Original release date
58	"Beginning of Part Three: Supreme Rule in Turbulence! As the South Star Fades, the North Star Appears!!"; Transliteration: "Dai-san-bu kaishi Ransei Hadō Hen Nanto midaruru toki Hokuto arawareri!!" (Japanese: 第3部開始乱世覇道編•南斗乱るる時北斗現われり!!)	January 9, 1986
With Shin (the Star of Martyrdom), Yuda (the Star of Betrayal) and Rei (the Star of Justice) now dead, only three of the Six Sacred Fists of the Nanto Seiken remain. Kenshiro leaves Lin and Bat with Mamiya and sets off alone to find the remaining ones. He arrives at a town and finds the inhabitants being mistreated by soldiers under the command of a man named Souther. Souther has proclaimed himself the "Holy Emperor", seeking to conquer the world by the century's end and using innocent children as slaves to build a pyramid-shaped mausoleum, which he boasts will stand as a symbol of his greatness.
59	"The Star of Darkness Engulfs the Heavens! Time Evolves Beyond the Deathmatch!"; Transliteration: "Ten o ōu ankoku no hoshi! Shitō no hate ni jidai wa ugoku!!" (Japanese: 天をおおう暗黒の星! 死闘の果てに時代は動く!!)	January 16, 1986
Somewhere in the desert, Raoh reflects on the growing power of Souther and his own desire to rebuild his empire. Meanwhile, as Souther's Hyenas prepare to capture Bat and Lin, they are saved by a stranger. In a small village, Kenshiro discovers that Souther's Hyenas are kidnapping children to work on his mausoleum. When another Hyena tries to kidnap children, Ken rescues them. He is surrounded by more Hyena troops, but they are decimated by rebels led by the blind martial artist Shu, one of the Six Sacred Fists of Nanto Seiken. He challenges Ken, but Ken proves to be too strong and defeats him. Bat and Lin intercede and explain that Shu saved them, and Ken offers his hand in friendship.
60	"Shu of the South Star White Heron Fist! What Will You Witness in the End of This Century!?"; Transliteration: "Nanto Hakuroken Shū! Omae wa kono seikimatsu ni nani o miru no ka!!" (Japanese: 南斗白鷺拳シュウ! お前はこの世紀末に何を見るのか!!)	January 23, 1986
Kenshiro joins Shu and his resistance against Souther and his men, led by Belga, who are still kidnapping children to work on his mausoleum. Lin offers to act as bait so Ken and Shu can trap and kill them. Something Shu says, however, reminds Ken that he once fought in the South Star dojo as a child, watched by Souther, Raoh and Shu. Shu challenged Kenshiro at that time, but although Shu won, he protected Kenshiro from the others, blinding himself as punishment for not killing the promising young boy and awakening his own Star of Benevolence.
61	"Love on the Battlefield! Must the Time Tear Love Apart!?"; Transliteration: "Senjō no koi! Jidai wa ai o mo hikisaku no ka!!" (Japanese: 戦場の恋! 時代は愛をも引き裂くのか!!)	January 30, 1986
When Jay, a young member of Shu's resistance is killed, Kenshiro goes to protect Jay's fiancée Ami at Suwanny village from Galzas, one of Souther's captains. Ken arrives at the village, only to find that Galzas' men have already invaded it and abducted the women and children. Ken rescues them and kills Galzas, avenging Jay's death.
62	"I Am Souther, the Holy Emperor! I Disallow Love and Compassion!!"; Transliteration: "Ore wa seitei Sauzā! Ai mo nasake mo yurusanai!!" (Japanese: 俺は聖帝サウザー! 愛も情も許さない!!)	February 6, 1986
Shu's rebels intercept one of Souther's food convoys, but they soon realize that the food has been poisoned. Kenshiro finally comes face-to-face with Souther. However, he first has to deal with the two assassins, Peji and Giji, exponents of the Nanto Sozanken (South Star Twin Slashing Fist) style. After defeating them, Ken faces the Holy Emperor, but although Ken strikes him with fatal blows, Souther appears to be immune to Ken's Hokuto Shinken techniques.
63	"A Young Hero Challenges His Fate! Scream from Your Soul Shall Move the Heavens!"; Transliteration: "Shukumei ni idomu chiisana yūsha! Sono tamashii no sakebi ga ten o ugokasu!!" (Japanese: 宿命に挑む小さな勇者! その魂の叫びが天を動かす!!)	February 13, 1986
Kenshiro is defeated by Souther and captured, badly wounded and bleeding. However, Shu's young son Shiba sets off to infiltrate Souther's lair and save Ken, even at the possible cost of his own life. Meanwhile, Ken is to be used as a sacrifice for the completion of Souther's Holy Cross Mausoleum. Shiba manages to rescue Ken and they escape into the desert, but are found by Souther's troops. Rather than let Ken be captured, Shiba sacrifices his own life to save Ken.
64	"A Bloody Battle, Shu vs. Souther! Love, Drowned in the Tears of the Star of Benevolence!!"; Transliteration: "Kessen Shū tai Sauzā! Jinsei no namida ni ai ga oboreru!!" (Japanese: 血戦シュウVSサウザー! 仁星の涙に愛がおぼれる!!)	February 20, 1986
Kenshiro is found by Raoh's men and treated, but he is then rescued by the rebels and returned to Shu's base. However, Souther has located the rebel base and, after an initial surprise attack, he moves in with a battalion of his forces. Shu sends the unconscious Ken off to safety with Bat and Lin while he remains to fight Souther and his troops. However, Souther uses his hostages to forestall Shu, then incapacitates him by severing the tendons in his legs, rendering him helpless. Souther's troops invade the rebel base, but Ken senses Shu's struggle and revives enough to begin to fight back.
65	"The Bloody Cross Mausoleum! Shu! I'll Catch Your Tears with My Heart!!"; Transliteration: "Chi no jūjiryō! Shū! Sono namida wa ore no kokoro de uketomeyō!!" (Japanese: 血の十字稜! シュウ! その涙は俺の心で受けとめよう!!)	February 27, 1986
Sensing Shu's struggle, Kenshiro awakens and emerges from the tunnels, regaining his strength and intimidating Souther's troops. Meanwhile, Shu is forced to carry the apex stone that will serve as the summit of Souther's Holy Cross Mausoleum. Toki and Raoh become aware that Kenshiro is about to confront Souther again, and head towards Souther's domain. As Shu continues to painfully carry the huge stone to the top of the pyramid, Toki and Raoh attack Souther's troops.
66	"Run Kenshiro! Another Comrade Is About To Die!!"; Transliteration: "Hashire Kenshirō! Mata hitori tomo ga shinde yuku!!" (Japanese: 走れケンシロウ! また一人友が死んで行く!!)	March 6, 1986
Kenshiro arrives at the Holy Cross Mausoleum and witnesses Shu's slow and painful public execution at the hands of Souther. Toki and Raoh also arrive at the scene to witness Ken's fight with Souther. As Shu arrives at the peak of the pyramid, he miraculously regains his eyesight and sees the now-adult Kenshiro before being crushed to death by the apex stone.
67	"Clash of the Polar Stars, Ken vs. Souther! My Star Is the Only Protector of Heaven!!"; Transliteration: "Kyokusei gekitotsu Ken tai Sauzā! Ten o mamoru wa waga hoshi hitotsu!!" (Japanese: 極星激突ケンVSサウザー! 天を守るは我が星一つ!!)	March 13, 1986
Before accepting Kenshiro's challenge, Souther recalls his tragic childhood, his rejection of the need for love and his motive for building the Holy Cross Mausoleum. Kenshiro fights Souther again, firstly using Shu's technique, out of respect for his dead friend. Meanwhile, Souther opens a secret room in the mausoleum, revealing the body of his master, Ogai. Kenshiro uses his Hokuto Shinken, but it seems ineffective against Souther. However, Ken believes that he has finally learned the secret of Souther's invulnerability.
68	"Souther, the Despondent Holy Emperor! You Are Weary from Love!!"; Transliteration: "Kanashiki Seitei Sauzā! Omae wa ai ni tsukarete iru!!" (Japanese: 悲しき聖帝サウザー! お前は愛につかれている!!)	March 20, 1986
During their fight, Kenshiro has realized Souther's secret; his heart is on the right side of his body and his pressure points have also been inverted. This enables Kenshiro to strike using his Hokuto Shinken. With Ken aware of his weakness, Souther uses the ultimate technique of his Nanto Hō-ōken (South Star Phoenix Fist) style as a last resort, but Kenshiro is able to fight back and eventually deals a fatal blow. The dying Souther joins his late master inside the mausoleum as Shu's blood begins to flow down the pyramid, which soon collapses, taking Souther with it. The children rejoice at Kenshiro's victory. Meanwhile, Raoh leaves, still intent on his own plans for conquest.
69	"Critical Times of the North Star! The Three Brothers of Fate Are on the Move!!"; Transliteration: "Hokuto saikyō no jidai! Tsuini ugokidashita shukumei no sankyōdai!!" (Japanese: 北斗最強の時代! 遂に動きだした宿命の3兄弟!!)	March 27, 1986
Koryu, Ryuken's former rival, sends Zengyo to report on Raoh's activities. Meanwhile, Raoh impatiently waits to regain his full strength in seclusion. Kenshiro still believes that Toki was the true successor of Hokuto Shinken and recalls the sacrifice Toki made to save him, Yuria and many others during the nuclear holocaust. After Zengyo reports to Koryu that Raoh has recovered, Koryu decides to seal Raoh's fists according to the succession principles. At the same time, Toki also resolves that Raoh must be stopped.
70	"The Other Divine Fist of the North Star! Drive Raoh to Oblivion!!"; Transliteration: "Mō hitotsu no Hokuto Shinken! Raō o yami ni hōmurisare!!" (Japanese: もう一つの北斗神拳! ラオウを闇に葬り去れ!!)	April 3, 1986
To gauge his strength after his recovery, Raoh challenges Koryu in a battle to the death and emerges victorious. Koryu's sons try to kill Raoh, but he is too powerful and easily defeats them, but lets them live. Meanwhile, Zengyo tells Kenshiro and Toki of Raoh's intentions. Kenshiro and Toki fight to determine if Toki is strong enough to defeat Raoh and Kenshiro wins. Nevertheless, Toki prepares for a death match with Raoh, fulfilling his own destiny to die as a martial artist, fighting the other adopted son of Ryuken.
71	"The Secret of Origin Revealed! The Heaven Prefers Tragedy!!"; Transliteration: "Abakareta shussei no himitsu! Ten wa itazurani higeki o konomu!!" (Japanese: 暴かれた出生の秘密! 天はいたずらに悲劇を好む!!)	April 10, 1986
Toki takes Kenshiro, Bat and Lin to his hometown and shows them the gravestones for him and his brother. Raoh arrives and reveals that he and Toki are siblings and how they met Ryuken after their parents died. Ryuken only wanted to adopt one child, forcing them to compete for the position, but Raoh helped Toki and they were both adopted. The battle between the brothers begins, Raoh's hard-fist style against Toki's soft-fist style, but they appear evenly matched.
72	"Farewell, Toki! A Man Only Cries Once!!"; Transliteration: "Saraba Toki! Otoko no namida wa ichido dake!!" (Japanese: さらばトキ! 男の涙は一度だけ!!)	April 17, 1986
Toki fights Raoh in a death match and Toki appears to gain the upper hand. However, Raoh eventually prevails, tearfully defeating his brother. Raoh leaves, rejecting his Raoh persona and again becoming Ken-Oh.
73	"Ryuga of Sirius! I'll Seize the Rainbow in Tempest!!"; Transliteration: "Tenrōsei no Otoko Ryūga! Ore wa ransei ni niji o tsukamu!!" (Japanese: 天狼星の男リュウガ! 俺は乱世に虹をつかむ!!)	May 8, 1986
Ryuga visits the graves of Shin and Yuria. Meanwhile, Ken-Oh returns to reclaim his territory in which some of his former lieutenants have become even more brutal than he was. One group has the misfortune of encountering Kenshiro, who stops them from mistreating the townspeople. Kenshiro then meets Ryuga, a martial artist and servant of Ken-Oh, whose astrological sign of the solitary star Sirius is neither part of Hokuto nor Nanto. Ryuga punishes the former troops and reclaims the territory for Ken-Oh. When Ken-Oh returns to claim his throne, Ryuga requests permission to challenge Kenshiro.
74	"A Wolf Running in the Horizon! There Lies the End of Love and Hatred!"; Transliteration: "Chiheisen o kakeru Ōkami! Soko wa ai to nikushimi no hate!!" (Japanese: 地平線を駆ける狼! そこは愛と憎しみの果て!!)	May 15, 1986
Ken-Oh surveys his territory and praises Ryuga for his loyalty. However, Ryuga is inwardly critical of Ken-Oh and his tyranny. After Ryuga witnesses Kenshiro's compassion towards others, he becomes determined to find out which of the two Hokuto brothers-at-arms is more to fit to lead in the new world.
75	"Forgive Me, My Sister! I Am Destined to Clash with the North Star!!"; Transliteration: "Yuruse imōto yo! Hokuto o osou wa waga hoshi no sadame!!" (Japanese: 許せ妹よ! 北斗を襲うはわが星の宿命!!)	May 29, 1986
Kenshiro goes to the aid of a village where the people have been forced to steal from other villages to feed the greedy bandit Sabat. After watching Kenshiro's behavior, Ryuga challenges him to test his strength, but Kenshiro is unwilling to fight back. However, Ryuga is determined to fight Kenshiro, the man whom his sister Yuria loved.
76	"An Iron Fist for the Roaring Wolf! Toki Is in Danger!!"; Transliteration: "Hoeru Ōkami ni tekken o. Ima, Toki ga abunai!!" (Japanese: 吠える狼に鉄拳を 今、トキが危ない!!)	June 5, 1986
Ryuga clears a village of bandits, claiming it for Ken-Oh but he seems uninterested in governing. Kenshiro arrives and Garou, Ryuga's second-in-command, challenges Kenshiro, but is no match for him. However, Garou reveals that Ryuga has gone to attack Toki. Ryuga finds Toki and severely wounds him to provoke rage within Kenshiro.
77	"Conclusion of Part Three: Let the New Age Awaken! The Wolf's Howl Moves the Heaven!"; Transliteration: "Dai-san-bu Kanketsu Mezameyo Shin Jidai! Ōkami no sakebi ga ten o tsuku!!" (Japanese: 第3部完結 目ざめよ新時代! 狼の叫びが天を衝く!!)	June 12, 1986
Kenshiro travels to Ryuga's castle and forces his way inside, determined to save Toki. Kenshiro finally accepts Ryuga's challenge, but Kenshiro quickly gets the upper hand. After he injures Ryuga, Toki intervenes, telling him that Ryuga had already committed seppuku and re-bandaged himself in preparation to die during the fight. As he lays dying, Ryuga says that he once believed that Ken-Oh was the one to bring order to the post-apocalyptic world, but now he believes that Kenshiro is the one to lead humanity into the future. With his last breath, Ryuga reveals to Kenshiro that he was Yuria's brother. Shortly after, Toki finally succumbs to his radiation sickness and peacefully passes away with Ryuga's body in his arms.
78	"Shin of the South Star Sacred Fist! Risked Your Life for Love That Never Will!!"; Transliteration: "Nanto Seiken Shin! Omae wa mukuwarenu ai ni inochi o kaketa!!" (Japanese: 南斗聖拳シン! お前は報われぬ愛に命をかけた!!)	June 26, 1986
While holding a funeral for Toki and Ryuga, Kenshiro recalls where it all began - with his old nemesis Shin, the man who engraved the seven scars on his chest and kidnapped his beloved Yuria. This is the first in a series of five episodes, each focusing on a different Nanto Seiken warrior.
79	"Rei of the South Star Waterfowl Fist! Was a Man Who Died for His Friends!!"; Transliteration: "Nanto Suichōken Rei! Tomo no tame ni shinda Otoko ga ita!!" (Japanese: 南斗水鳥拳レイ! 友の為に死んだ男がいた!!)	July 10, 1986
Kenshiro reflects on the life of his close friend and ally Rei, the man who sacrificed his life to save the woman he loved.
80	"Yuda of the South Star Crimson Crane Fist! His Beautiful Smile Calls for Tragedy!!"; Transliteration: "Nanto Kōkakuken Yuda! Sono Utsukushiki Hohoemi ga Higeki o Yobu!!" (Japanese: 南斗紅鶴拳ユダ! その美しき微笑が悲劇を呼ぶ!!)	July 17, 1986
Kenshiro recalls Rei's battle against his rival Yuda, the man who once tormented Rei's beloved Mamiya.
81	"Shu of the South Star White Heron Fist! The Heaven Only Bestows Cruel Destinies"; Transliteration: "Nanto Hakuroken Shū! Ten wa akumade Hijō na Shukumei o kasu!!" (Japanese: 南斗白鷺拳シュウ! 天はあくまで非情な宿命を課す!!)	July 24, 1986
Kenshiro remembers Shu, a selfless man whose encounter with a young Kenshiro led him to his destiny.
82	"Holy Emperor Souther!! Your Deep Affection Consumes You in Love!"; Transliteration: "Seitei Sauzā! Omae wa ai fukaki yueni ai ni oboreru!!" (Japanese: 聖帝サウザー! お前は愛深きゆえに愛におぼれる!!)	July 31, 1986
Kenshiro remembers Souther, the self-proclaimed Holy Emperor of Nanto Seiken. This is the last episode before the series resumes its storyline.

=== Part 4 ===
No.	Title	Original release date
83	"Part Four, the Final Chapter: Raoh Must Die! The Legend Turns to Terror!!"; Transliteration: "Dai-yon-bu Saishūshō Raō shi subeshi! Densetsu ga Kyōfu ni Kawaru!!" (Japanese: 第4部最終章 ラオウ死すべし! 伝説が恐怖に変わる!!)	August 7, 1986
Kenshiro, Bat and Lin continue their journey and find themselves at a village ruled by a follower of Ken-Oh named Bugal. He is a man obsessed with washing who has monopolized the town's water supply for himself. Although Ken rids the village of Bugal, the people remind him that there is still danger while Raoh remains as the tyrant Ken-Oh.
84	"The South Star Strikes Back! The Wind Brigade Protects the Last General of the South Star!!"; Transliteration: "Nanto no gyakushū! Kaze no Ryodan yo Saigo no Shō o mamore!!" (Japanese: 南斗の逆襲! 風の旅団よ最後の将を守れ!!)	August 14, 1986
Rihaku, leader of the Nanto Five Chariot Stars, orders Hyui and his motorcycle-riding Wind Brigade to begin attacking Ken-Oh's outposts. Meanwhile, Kenshiro encounters one of Ken-Oh's enlistment groups and infiltrates them. He finds the group run by the ruthless but cowardly David, who uses Glenn the Killer Machine, a man he raised only to fight. After Ken defeats Glenn, he renounces his evil ways, only to be betrayed by his master David, who orders his men to kill Glenn. As David and his men flee from Ken, they are slaughtered by Hyui and his Wind Brigade.
85	"Prelude to a Death Match! The Screams of Hyui of the Wind Echoes in the Heaven!!"; Transliteration: "Shitō e no jomaku! Kaze no otoko Hyūi no sakebi ga ten ni kodamasu!!" (Japanese: 死闘への序幕! 風の男ヒューイの叫びが天にこだます!!)	August 21, 1986
Hyui of the Wind challenges Kenshiro to a sparring match, but is outclassed and leaves, wounded. At the capital of the South Star, the mysterious Last General of Nanto prepares to oppose Ken-Oh. Hyui launches a war campaign against Ken-Oh and his troops and succeeds in luring Ken-Oh out to face him, but he is no match for Ken-Oh and is killed with a single strike. His brother Shion carries the terrible news to the capital of the South Star.
86	"The Burning Crimson Brigade! Shuren Is Drenched in Tears of Flame!!"; Transliteration: "Moeru Shinku no Gundan! Honō no namida ga Shuren o nurasu!!" (Japanese: 燃える真紅の軍団! 炎の涙がシュレンをぬらす!!)	August 28, 1986
On hearing of his brother star Hyui's death, Shuren vows to avenge him. He burns down his own castle as a funeral pyre, leaving him and his Crimson Army with no home to return to. Meanwhile, Morgan, the chief of Ken-Oh's vanguard force with terrible driving ability, has Bat's buggy destroyed for passing him on the trail. Kenshiro follows him to the town which is under Morgan's brutal control, first taking care of his men, and then confronting Morgan. Morgan tries to escape, but crashes because Bat had earlier sabotaged his vehicle. Elsewhere, Shuren's men attack Ken-Oh's vanguard force with flaming arrows.
87	"Five Chariot Stars in Danger! Raoh Has Finally Pierced Through the Flames!!"; Transliteration: "Ayaushi Goshasei! Tsuini Raō ga honō o mo tsukiyabutta!!" (Japanese: 危うし五車星! 遂にラオウが炎をも突き破った!!)	September 4, 1986
Shuren's forces continue their assault on Ken-Oh's vanguard and he prepares to face Ken-Oh himself. Meanwhile, Kenshiro, Bat and Lin eventually arrive at another town and befriend a gentle giant named Fudo after saving him from a group of Ken-Oh's thugs. Meanwhile, Shuren attacks Ken-Oh with his Passionate Flame Fist, but is beaten down. He then uses his ultimate technique, which causes him to be engulfed in flames, as he sacrifices his life to defeat Ken-Oh, but fails in his attempt. Ken, Bat and Lin continue on their way, now accompanied by Fudo who appears to have star-shaped tattoos on his arm.
88	"The Five Chariot Stars Approach Kenshiro! Who Are You, Fudo?!"; Transliteration: "Goshasei Kenshiro ni Sekkin! Fudō omae wa nanimono!!" (Japanese: 五車星ケンシロウに接近! フドウお前は何者!!)	September 11, 1986
Ken-Oh's forces counter-attack and wipe out Shuren's Flame Brigade. Meanwhile, Kenshiro and his companions arrive in the next town where Fudo is revealed to be one of the Five Chariot Stars as he secretly learns about the deaths of Hyui and Shuren. Later, on the trail, Ken challenges a gang of bandits led by a man named Gokure. He kills all but Gokure and three others, who then combine to use their Taizan-ryū Shisoku Ken (Mount Tai-Style Four Bundled Fists) style, but Ken easily defeats them. Fudo then reveals that he is Fudo of the Mountains and has been charged with taking Ken to the Last General of the Six Sacred Fists of Nanto. Meanwhile, Juza of the Clouds receives a request from Rihaku to halt Ken-Oh's advance, but he has little interest in becoming involved in any conflict.
89	"The Crisis Is Near! Ken, Destiny Awaits at the Capital of the South Star!"; Transliteration: "Fū'unkyū o tsugu! Ken, shukumei ga Nanto no Miyako de matte iru!!" (Japanese: 風雲急を告ぐ! ケン、宿命が南斗の都で待っている!!)	September 25, 1986
Kenshiro agrees to accompany Fudo south. Meanwhile, Dalko, a bandit leader, captures a group of women, but is killed by Juza, who takes the women with him. Elsewhere, Ken and his friends face a group of bandits pretending to be Ken-Oh's men, but they only cause a short delay. At Juza's castle, Rihaku's agents attempt to persuade Juza to join the Last General's cause.
90	"I Am Juza of the Clouds! I Shall Move with the Flow of Time!!"; Transliteration: "Ore wa Kumo no Jūza! Toki no nagare ni mi o makasu!!" (Japanese: 俺は雲のジュウザ! 時の流れに身を任す!!)	October 16, 1986
Ken-Oh's agents locate the capital of the South Star with Rihaku in charge. Ken-Oh decides to march his troops south to the capital, with only Juza standing between them. Meanwhile, Rihaku's agents again attempt to persuade Juza to fight, but he would rather spend time in his pool surrounded by a bevy of beautiful girls. Fudo also receives the news, but encounters Ken-Oh's motorcycle-riding Lance Squadron led by Yakobu. However, the squadron only causes a short delay on their journey to South Star. Juza recalls how he fell in love with Yuria, only to find that she was his half-sister. His reverie is interrupted by the arrival of Gelza, a bandit that has come to his castle to reclaim "his women" from Juza. However, Juza destroys him with his unique self-taught fighting style.
91	"The Clouds Remain! The Masked General Is Finally Revealed!!"; Transliteration: "Kumo izenu ugokazu! Tsuini Kamen no Shō ga sugao o miseta!!" (Japanese: 雲いぜん動かず! 遂に仮面の将が素顔を見せた!!)	October 23, 1986
Juza continues to refuse to join the fight to defend the Last General of the South Star. Meanwhile, Kenshiro and his friends find themselves at a village ruled by Dolfi, assisted by his assassin Zenda, who oppresses the residents by giving them a false sense of democracy. However, Ken forces Zanda to vote for Dolfi's execution. Later, at a party at Juza's castle, Rihaku's daughter, Toh, drugs Juza and he is taken to the Last General's castle. When the Last General reveals her identity to him, Juza swears to fight for her.
92	"Juza of the Clouds Resurrects! I Have No Fear for Raoh!!"; Transliteration: "Yomigaetta Kumo no Jūza! Ore wa Raō o osorenai!!" (Japanese: よみがえった雲のジュウザ! 俺はラオウを恐れない!!)	October 30, 1986
Ken-Oh's forces and Kenshiro both head towards the capital of the South Star while Juza and his men prepare to stop Ken-Oh. Kenshiro and his friends attempt to find a way to cross a bridge which is under the surveillance of Ken-Oh's men. They travel in a hay cart with Bat dressed as a cute girl, but the deception is discovered and Kenshiro has to fight Ken-Oh's men. Elsewhere, Juza and his gang intercept Ken-Oh, who is surprised to see that Juza has regained his will to fight.
93	"Juza vs. Raoh! An End of the Legend of the Invincible!!"; Transliteration: "Taiketsu Jūza tai Raō! Ima muteki densetsu ni shūshifu o!!" (Japanese: 対決ジュウザVSラオウ! 今無敵伝説に終止符を!!)	November 6, 1986
Juza engages Ken-Oh, and appears to have the technique to stop him. Elsewhere, Kenshiro faces Jenomy, an assassin who seeks to make Kenshiro his 10,000th victim. However, Kenshiro forces him to become a victim of his own twin swords. As Juza and Ken-Oh fight, Ken-Oh recalls when they were both training and Juza's talents rivaled his own. Suddenly, during a staged attack, Juza hijacks Ken-Oh's steed Kokuoh and flees the battle as his gang ambushes Ken-Oh's forces, slowing his advance. However, as Juza rides on, he realizes that he has been wounded by Ken-Oh.
94	"Fudo in Peril!! Hurry, Ken. A Man Must Not Abandon His Friends!!"; Transliteration: "Fudō zettaizetsumei! Isoge Ken, otoko wa tomo o misutenai!!" (Japanese: フドウ絶対絶命! 急げケン、男は友を見すてない!!)	November 13, 1986
Ken-Oh is fitted with a new uniform and orders his agent Zaku to delay Kenshiro. Zaku's forces catch up with Ken and his companions, but Fudo stays behind to delay them while Kenshiro continues south. Concerned at the delay, Zaku's right-hand man Hilka kidnaps two of Fudo's adopted children, Danji and Jiro. He throws them into a bottomless quicksand pit in an attempt to force Fudo to enter the quicksand himself to rescue them.
95	"Treacherous Quicksand! Will the Hand of Salvation Reach Fudo?"; Transliteration: "Hijō no suna jigoku! Shisuru Fudō ni sukui no te wa todoku no ka!!" (Japanese: 非情の砂地獄! 死するフドウに救いの手は届くのか!!)	November 20, 1986
Fudo is caught in a quicksand pit with two of his orphans when Kenshiro is told of his predicament. Ken is forced to make a choice between continuing on to the Nanto Capital or helping Fudo, and decides to go to Fudo's rescue. Hilka and his men use their Taizan Yōken (Mount Tai Bewitching Fist) style to attack him, but Kenshiro is too powerful and defeats them all.
96	"Juza Falls! I'll Give My Life to Protect the Woman I Love"; Transliteration: "Jūza taoru! Ore wa inochi o sutete mo aisuru onna o mamorō!!" (Japanese: ジュウザ倒る! 俺は命を捨てても愛する女を守ろう!!)	November 27, 1986
Juza prepares to confront Ken-Oh and continue their battle. Meanwhile, Kenshiro, Fudo and the children return to Fudo's village, but as they arrive, Fudo collapses from arrows fired into his back by Hilka's men at the quicksand pit. Juza returns to Ken-Oh, removes his restrictive armor and attacks Ken-Oh using his special technique. Although he wounds Ken-Oh, Ken-Oh is too strong and grasps Juza in a fatal hold. Back at Fudo's village, Fudo is too injured to accompany Ken to the Nanto Capital and finally tells him that the true identity of the Last General of Nanto is none other than Ken's fiancée, Yuria.
97	"Farewell Yuria! A Strong Man Will Not Speak of Love, Even in Death!!"; Transliteration: "Saraba Yuria! Tsuyoki otoko wa shishite mo ai o katarazu!!" (Japanese: さらばユリア! 強き男は死しても愛を語らず!!)	December 4, 1986
Fudo tells Kenshiro how the Nanto Five Chariot Stars saved Yuria, who had survived the destruction of Southern Cross. They gained Shin's approval to protect her from Ken-Oh, before Shin took the blame for her death. Ken then rushes towards the Nanto Capital with greater urgency to protect Yuria. Meanwhile, Juza refuses to reveal the identity of the Last General to Ken-Oh. Juza fights until he is finally killed by Ken-Oh, who then grants him a gracious burial. Following Juza's death, Ken-Oh deduces that Yuria is the Last General, and he and Ken separately race against each other to reach the Nanto Capital.
98	"The Capital of the South Star Trembles! The Two Brothers of the North Star Finally Arrive!!"; Transliteration: "Yureru Nanto no Miyako! Tsuini Hokuto Nikyōdai ga yatte kita!!" (Japanese: ゆれる南斗の都! 遂に北斗2兄弟がやってきた!!)	December 11, 1986
While Kenshiro and Ken-Oh race against each other to reach the Nanto Capital, Rihaku tells his daughter Toh about Hokuto Shinken, the deaths of Jagi and Toki, and the history between Kenshiro and Ken-Oh.
99	"Sadness of the Five Chariot Stars! Love and Destiny Looms Over the Woman!!"; Transliteration: "Kanashiki Goshasei! Omae wa ai to shukumei o hikizuru onna!!" (Japanese: 悲しき五車星! お前は愛と宿命をひきずる女!!)	December 18, 1986
Kenshiro faces Ken-Oh's shadow brigade, while Ken-Oh advances alone and enters Yuria's castle first. However, instead of finding the Last General, he encounters Toh, who is masquerading as Yuria. She declares that she has loved Ken-Oh ever since he saved her from a pack of wolves when she was a young girl, but he only had eyes for Yuria. Spurned by Ken-Oh and rather than reveal Yuria's location, Toh kills herself. Ken arrives at the castle just as Ken-Oh declares that Yuria will suffer subjugation or death.
100	"The Ultimate Secret Technique, Unconscious Transmigration! Raoh, I've Got You Now!!"; Transliteration: "Kyūkyoku no ōgi Musō Tensei! Raō, Tsuini omae o oitsumeta!!" (Japanese: 究極の奥義無想転生! ラオウ、遂にお前を追いつめた!!)	December 25, 1986
Yuria attempts to escape from her castle in order to be reunited with Kenshiro, while Rihaku challenges Ken-Oh. However, Ken decides that he must confront Ken-Oh before meeting Yuria, fearing that Yuria's life might be in danger as long as Ken-Oh lives. Kenshiro finally meets Ken-Oh and seems to have renewed strength, attacking Ken-Oh and avoiding Ken-Oh's counter-attacks by incorporating the fighting styles of his former comrades. Ken-Oh suspects that Kenshiro has acquired the ultimate secret technique of Musō Tensei (Nil-Thought Rebirth) through experiencing sadness. For the first time in his life, Ken-Oh experiences true fear.
101	"Is It the End of Raoh and His Ambitions? The Heaven Hesitates Once Again!!"; Transliteration: "Raō taore yabō hateru ka? Shikashi ten wa mata yoromeita!!" (Japanese: ラオウ倒れ野望果てるか? しかし天はまたよろめいた!!)	January 8, 1987
Ken-Oh is overwhelmed by Kenshiro's newly discovered technique of Musō Tensei and recalls how Ken's empathy for others may have made him stronger. Ken-Oh is willing to accept death through mutual destruction. However, he accidentally triggers one of Rihaku's booby-traps and the floor collapses beneath him. Ken-Oh emerges from the wreckage and stumbles into Yuria. He then abducts her and rides off. Meanwhile, although Kenshiro has been blinded by his battle with Ken-Oh, he decides to pursue him and rescue Yuria.
102	"Raoh, the Confused Giant! I Don't Believe in Love!!"; Transliteration: "Mayoeru kyojin Raō! Ore wa ai nado shinjinai!!" (Japanese: 迷える巨人ラオウ! 俺は愛など信じない!!)	January 15, 1987
Ken-Oh recovers after being treated by Yuria, which causes him immense shame and to reject the identity of Ken-Oh, reverting to the name of Raoh and calling himself the "Demon King". Meanwhile, the blind Kenshiro continues to seek Raoh and rescue Yuria. He is ambushed by Jado and his bikers to prevent him from reaching Ken-Oh, but he still manages to destroy them. Meanwhile, Raoh recalls the time he beat Ken as a promising but inexperienced student and how Toki predicted that one day Ken would threaten him. Haunted by nightmares of his near-defeat by Ken, Raoh seeks to overcome his fears by fighting Fudo, the only fighter he ever feared. He rides to Fudo's village and issues his challenge.
103	"A Challenge from the Devil! Fudo, Be the Demon for Those You Love!!"; Transliteration: "Akuma no Chōsenjō! Fudō, aisuru mono no tame ni oni tonare!!" (Japanese: 悪魔の挑戦状! フドウ、愛する者のために鬼となれ!!)	January 22, 1987
The gentle Fudo is shown in the past to have been a terrifying bandit until he learned the value of life from a young Yuria. He is challenged by Raoh, who threatens to kill the children if he refuses to fight. Fudo reluctantly accepts the challenge and dons his old armor. Raoh orders his men to fire arrows into him if he retreats during the battle. Meanwhile, Kenshiro reaches Raoh's lightly defended castle and discovers that Raoh has left to fight Fudo. Back at Fudo's village, Raoh slowly gains the upper hand in his fight with Fudo, but takes considerable punishment himself.
104	"Fudo, the Gentle Warrior! His Tears Awaken a Fiery Soul!!"; Transliteration: "Yasashiki yūsha Fudō! Sono namida wa atsuki kokoro o yobisamasu!!" (Japanese: やさしき勇者フドウ! その涙は熱き心を呼びさます!!)	January 29, 1987
Raoh appears to have gained the upper hand against Fudo, but Fudo's courage and love for his children allows him to persist further in battle. On his way to the village, Kenshiro is again stopped, this time by a group of Ken-Oh's Buddhist monks, but he defeats them without killing. Meanwhile, as the battle between Raoh and Fudo continues, Raoh momentarily retreats, causing his forces to shoot a giant arrow which pierces Fudo. More arrows follow, hitting Fudo. As Fudo lies dying, he warns Raoh that Ken will defeat him. Raoh then berates his own men for shooting Fudo and causes them to flee. Ken finally arrives as Fudo succumbs to his injuries.
105	"Protect the Merciful Mother of the South Star! Even If It's the End of the Five Chariots!!"; Transliteration: "Nanto Jibosei o mamore! Tatoe Gosha no inochi hateru tomo!!" (Japanese: 南斗慈母星を守れ! たとえ五車の生命果てるとも!!)	February 5, 1987
At Fudo's funeral pyre, Rihaku, the sole surviving member of the Five Chariot Stars, reflects on the sacrifices of his comrades as they fought Raoh to protect Yuria. Meanwhile, Kenshiro regains his sight.
106	"Raoh, Shaken by a Nightmare! Yuria, You Are the Only One!!"; Transliteration: "Akumu ni obieru Raō! Yuria, mō omae shika inai!!" (Japanese: 悪夢におびえるラオウ! ユリア、もうお前しかいない!!)	February 12, 1987
Raoh loses the respect of his men after rampaging against them and they defy Raoh to protect Yuria, who cared for them. Raoh prepares to kill Yuria, but although he realizes that he may love her, he strikes her. Raoh then sends Kokuoh to fetch Kenshiro. Kokuoh takes Ken to Hokuto Renkitōza, the holy training ground of Hokuto Shinken, for his final confrontation with Raoh.
107	"Showdown at the North Star Mind and Body Training Ground! No One Can Stop Them Now!!"; Transliteration: "Kessen jō wa Hokuto Renkitōza! Mō dare mo yatsura o tomerarenai!!" (Japanese: 決戦場は北斗練気闘座! もう誰も奴らをとめられない!!)	February 19, 1987
Kenshiro meets Raoh at Hokuto Renkitōza. Raoh shows Ken Yuria's lifeless body, the woman he apparently killed to bring sadness to his soul. Raoh reveals that he too has mastered Musō Tensei, making him evenly matched with Kenshiro. Their battle rages, trading blows of savage intensity, until they both prepare to exchange their final blows.
108	"Farewell, Brothers of the North Star! They're Beyond Love and Sorrow!!"; Transliteration: "Saraba Hokuto Nikyōdai! Ima futari wa ai to kanashimi no hate ni!!" (Japanese: さらば北斗2兄弟! いま2人は愛と哀しみの果てに!!)	February 26, 1987
As Kenshiro and Raoh exchange their final blows, Ken breaks through Raoh's defenses and finally delivers a fatal blow. The Death Omen Star shines as Raoh begins to die. It is revealed that Raoh did not kill Yuria because she was already dying from an illness, and that he only struck a pressure point to place her in a death-like state. It is also revealed that Raoh's intervention has extended Yuria's lifespan from a few months to several years.
109	"Conclusion of the Final Chapter - Now Revealed!! The 2000 Year History of the North Star!!"; Transliteration: "Saishūshō Kan Ima katarō! Hokuto nisen nen no rekishi!!" (Japanese: 最終章完 いま語ろう! 北斗2000年の歴史!!)	March 5, 1987
A summary is presented of Kenshiro's life, from the day he first met Yuria as a child to his final battle against Raoh. As he dies, Raoh bids farewell to Kenshiro while Yuria slowly regains consciousness. Kenshiro and Yuria leave to finally be together.

== Fist of the North Star 2 ==
=== Part 5 ===
No.	Title	Original release date
110	"The Past Is Gone. The Dawn of the New Age!!"; Transliteration: "Toki wa nagare. Mata jidai ga ugoita....!!" (Japanese: 時は流れ また時代が動いた...•!!)	March 12, 1987
The Army of the Tentei (Celestial Army) is expanding its territory through threat and oppression. Citizens are press-ganged into manually creating energy in the Imperial Capital to create bright light for Viceroy Jakoh to counteract his fear of darkness. A gravestone set up for Kenshiro acts as a trap for two scythe-wielding Tentei assassins who kill anyone visiting the site. Bat and Lin lead a Hokuto rescue party to save men abducted by the Tentei Army to work as slaves in the Imperial Capital, but the men are burned to death before they can be set free. Meanwhile a mysterious bearded drifter wanders into a poverty-stricken town and collapses.
111	"When Will He Awaken?!"; Transliteration: "Aitsu wa itsu mezameru no ka....!?" (Japanese: あいつはいつ目覚めるのか････!?)	March 19, 1987
Gele, the new Tentei enforcer searches a town for remnants of the Red Dragon Party, a resistance movement that once opposed the Tentei's army in the past. He finds Muhari, a former Red Dragon Party leader and the father of Maru who helped the bearded stranger. However the stranger defends the townspeople against Gele and he is finally revealed as Kenshiro after he uses his Hokuto Shinken.
112	"The Savior Comes from the North!!"; Transliteration: "Kyūseishu, kita yori kitaru!!" (Japanese: 救世主、北より来たる!!)	March 26, 1987
Kenshiro visits his tombstone where he disposes of the two assassins who kill anyone who visits his grave. He then single-handedly attacks one of the Celestial Army outposts and the survivors flee to a town run by Bask. Meanwhile, the executioner Barone captures a young couple who are mistaken for Lin and Bat, but Bask decides to execute the woman as Lin anyway. However, Kenshiro arrives riding Kukoh and kills Barone and Bask, reuniting with a tearful Lin, Bat and Rihaku.
113	"The Mysterious Bounty Hunter, Ein! Kenshiro's Head Is Mine!!"; Transliteration: "Nazo no Shōkinkasegi Ain! Ore ga Kenshirō no kubi o toru!!" (Japanese: 謎の賞金稼ぎアイン! 俺がケンシロウの首をとる!!)	April 2, 1987
After being reunited with Bat and Lin and telling them of his final years with Yuria, Kenshiro decides to join their cause, giving the Hokuto Army a needed boost in morale. Jakoh places a bounty on Kenshiro's head and a man named Ein decides to take the up offer, beating up the other contenders. However after Ein is beaten when he challenges Kenshiro. The giant bounty hunter Buzori ridicules Ein who then angrily defeats the boastful and overconfident Buzori with one punch. Kenshrio then visits the obese Imperial Captain Geira who tries unsuccessfully to hypnotize Kenshiro who then kills him.
114	"Another Art of Assassination! The Imperial Fist of the Source Star Is the Name!!"; Transliteration: "Mata hitotsu ansatsuken! Sono na wa Gento Kōken!!" (Japanese: また一つ暗殺拳! その名は元斗皇拳!!)	April 9, 1987
To draw Kenshiro into battle, Viceroy Jakoh sends Solia of the Purple Light to Mamiya's village where he kills the elder and prohibits any reference to the North and South Stars. As Bat and Lin take their forces to free the last section of the western area, Kenshiro rides into Mamiya's village and finds it devastated. He comes to the rescue of Mamiya and Airi and faces Solia, a master of Gento Kōken who has been ordered to annihilate anyone associated with the Hokuto and Nanto schools. Meanwhile Bat finds Haz and Gil, the Harn brothers encased in a concrete block within the prison and decides to take them with him. Back at the village, Kenshiro suffers some injuries in his fight with Solia, but still manages to defeat him.
115	"Rage of the Celestial Emperor! Falco, Obliterate the North Star from Earth!!"; Transliteration: "Tentei ikaru! Faruko, Hokuto o chijō yori nedayashi ni seyo!!" (Japanese: 天帝怒る!ファルコ、北斗を地上より根絶やしにせよ!!)	April 23, 1987
While attempting to catch up with Bat and Lin, Kenshiro is confronted by Shoki of the Red Light, a man who once helped Kenshiro by allowing him and Yuria to live in his village. However, he is no match for Kenshiro whom he allows to pass. Meanwhile, Bat and Lin lead a desperate battle against the Golden General Falco, the strongest of the Gento warriors who easily defeats the Hokuto Army. To save the others, Bat claims that he is their leader, however Falco identifies Lin as the one they follow.
116	"The Wrath of the South Star! The Illustrious Harn Brothers!"; Transliteration: "Nanto no Tamashii moyu! Sōzetsu Hān Kyōdai!!" (Japanese: 南斗の魂燃ゆ! 壮絶ハーン兄弟!!)	May 7, 1987
Just when Falco is about to execute Lin in front of her supporters, Falco is challenged to combat by the Harn Brothers who are seeking revenge against Falco for killing most of the Nanto Seiken masters. Meanwhile, Ein tries to lure Kenshiro into one of his traps, but Kenshiro dismisses him as a nuisance. Although very strong, Haz and Gil are no match for Falco. They attempt to explode a bomb to destroy Falco, but his men surround him, sacrificing themselves so that he can survive.
117	"Ein in Danger! Hands of Evil Reach for His Love!!"; Transliteration: "Ain Ayaushi! Aisuru onna ni ma no te ga nobita!!" (Japanese: アイン危うし! 愛する女に魔の手が伸びた!!)	May 14, 1987
Commander Beron asks Ein to lead the bounty hunters against Kenshiro but he refuses, preferring to work alone. Ein meets Bat who convinces him to switch sides and join the Hokuto Army. Later, they attack Beron's stronghold and Beron decides to take revenge by kidnapping Ein's "little lady", Asuka. Surprisingly, Kenshiro come to Ein's aid. Ein then takes his revenge on Beron for threatening Asuka, the child of the woman who saved his life.
118	"Falco, the Brave General of the Source Star! There Lies the Shadow of Raoh..."; Transliteration: "Gento no mōshō Faruko! Soko ni wa Raō no kage ga...." (Japanese: 元斗の猛将ファルコ! そこにはラオウの影が････)	May 28, 1987
As Kenshiro and the Hokuto Army approach the Imperial Capital, he learns about how Falco sacrificed his right leg to save his village when threatened by Ken-Oh and his army. Meanwhile, in the capital, Shoki is punished by Viceroy Jakoh for not destroying Kenshiro. When Jakoh also beats Falco for insubordination, Shoki attacks Jakoh, accusing him of misrepresenting the Celestial Empress. However Falco defends Jakoh, apparently killing Shoki. Falco then helps the wounded Shoki to escape the capital, but he is seen by Jakoh and his minions, Green Light Taiga and Blue Light Boltz who spears the wounded Shoki. Shoki later dies, but not before he tells Kenshiro that Jakoh is the real enemy. Kenshiro retrieves the spear and swears vengeance against Boltz.
119	"The Emperor's Cries Echoes Through the Imperial Capital. Falco, Where Have You Gone?"; Transliteration: "Teito ni kodama su Tentei no nakigoe! Faruko wa izuko ni...." (Japanese: 帝都にこだます天帝の泣き声! ファルコはいずこに････)	June 4, 1987
Jakoh has a nightmare in which he is threatened by Kenshiro, then awakes to find Kenshiro and the Hokuto Army at the gates of the Imperial Capital. Gento warrior Boltz attacks Kenshiro with his Source Star Hundred Thousand Spears of Light but Kenshiro is unimpressed and destroys Boltz, avenging Shoki. Inside, Falco regrets not killing the cowardly Jakoh years earlier as Jakoh now has the Celestial Empress captive and threatens to kill her if Kenshiro is not stopped. Meanwhile, Kensiro fights his way into the capital, but pauses rather than kill Falco's men. Inside, Falco hands a detonator to his lover Myu in order to destroy the Imperial Capital if he loses to Kenshiro. Falco then goes out and engages Kenshiro in a battle to the death, causing the heavens to split open.
120	"The Celestial Emperor Is Finally Revealed"; Transliteration: "Tsuini Tentei no shōtai ga mieta!!" (Japanese: ついに天帝の正体が見えた!!)	June 11, 1987
While Kenshiro and Falco engage in battle, Lin senses that the Tentei is calling out for her and enters the Imperial Capital along with Bat and Ein. Jakoh discovers that Myu has the detonator and orders her killed but she is protected by Saiya, one of Falco's men. Suddenly Lin and her companions arrive, but Jakoh is protected by Green Light Taiga and he drops them into a pit below. There, they meet the Celestial Emperor who's actually a woman with a strong resemblance to Lin and it is revealed that she's the twin sister of Lin. Years ago when they were still babies, Jakoh originally ordered Lin killed, but Falco saved her instead when he couldn't bear to end her life. Although blind from years trapped underground as Jakoh kept her imprisoned to coerce Falco to obey him out of desperation for her life, Empress Lui embraces her sister Lin. Meanwhile outside, the brutal battle between the North and Source Stars continues.
121	"An Elegy for Ein! Die Bravely than Live Without Honor!"; Transliteration: "Ain no Banka! Hokori o sutete ikiru yori atsuki shi o!!" (Japanese: アインの挽歌! 誇りをすてて生きるより熱き死を!!)	June 25, 1987
Jakoh collapses the roof of his dungeon to kill those below, but Ein protects the others with his body. Outside, Kenshiro and Falco continue their battle, with both of them injured, exhausted and their defenses weakened. Kenshiro manages to make a winning strike, but holds back, not wanting to kill Falco as they fight to a standstill. Underground, the fatally injured Ein entreats Lui and Lin to stop the battle between Kenshiro and Falco and uses his remaining energy to help the group break out. Jakoh orders his men to shoot down Kenshiro and Falco with huge metal arrows, but Kenshiro and Falco's men protect their leader; the former catching the arrows but the latter using their bodies as shields sacrificing their life. Ein finally frees the underground group, and they emerge to see Kenshiro and Falco, but the heroic Ein collapses and dies from his efforts.
122	"The Fall of the Imperial Capital! Jakoh, You Can Dream in Hell!!"; Transliteration: "Teito hōkai! Jakō, semete jigoku de yume o miyo!!" (Japanese: 帝都崩壊! ジャコウ、せめて地獄で夢を見よ!!)	July 9, 1987
With the rescue of the Celestial Empress at the expense of Ein's life, Kenshiro and Falco stop their fight. Kenshiro and Falco turn their attention towards Jakoh who declares himself Celestial Emperor. With Jakoh's soldiers defeated, even Green Light Taiga abandons him. Jakoh then tries to flee for his life, however Falco finally confronts and destroys him. Meanwhile, Lin re-enters the capital complex to rescue the survivors, but is captured by Taiga. He detonates explosives, destroying the structure, but escaping with Lin through flooded tunnels. As the Hokuto group bids farewell to the dead Ein, Taiga and the remnants of Jakoh's forces prepare to travel with Lin across the Sea of Death to another land.

=== Part 6 ===
No.	Title	Original release date
123	"The Ordeal Never Ends! Kenshiro Crosses the Ocean!!"; Transliteration: "Hateshinaki shiren! Kenshirō umi o wataru!!" (Japanese: 果てしなき試練! ケンシロウ海を渡る!!)	July 16, 1987
Lin is kidnapped by Taiga and taken with the remnants of Jakoh's forces across the Sea of Death to the Kingdom of Shura. Falco sets off alone to rescue her and Kenshiro follows. On the way, Kenshiro is attacked by pirates. He overcomes them and convinces Captain Akashachi to sail to Shura after the crew desert him. Falco arrives on Asura and sees the remains of Taiga and his men on the beach. After defeating one Shura attacker he heads inland. Captain Akashachi tells Kenshiro how years ago, one young Shura warrior killed his crew of 100 men, left him crippled, and took his young son. Kenshiro goes ashore, and after defeating two Shura who attack him, he finds Falco severely wounded from an encounter with a single warrior who now confronts Kenshiro.
124	"What Awaits on the Continent of Darkness? There Lies the Legendary Land of Asura!!"; Transliteration: "Nani ga matsu ankoku tairiku! Soko wa densetsu no Shura no Kuni!!" (Japanese: 何が待つ暗黒大陸! そこは伝説の修羅の国!!)	July 23, 1987
Falco asks Kenshiro to use Sekkatsuko to restore his energy for one last battle, wanting to die with honor. He engages the nameless warrior and manages to defeat him, expending his remaining energy. Meanwhile Lin is taken into a stadium where, before the regional leader Kaizer, two men fight to the death to claim her as their bride. However, Kaizer sends the victor Alph to deal with Kenshiro before he can wed Lin. As Falco lies dying, a carrier pigeon delivers a message that Myu is pregnant, thus providing a successor to the Imperial Fist of the Source Star.
125	"Good or Evil? The Mysterious North Star Lapis Lazuli Fist Appears!!"; Transliteration: "Zen ka aku ka? Nazo no Hokuto Ryūken arawaru!!" (Japanese: 善か悪か? 謎の北斗琉拳現わる!!)	July 30, 1987
Kenshiro reaches the gates of Shura and faces Alph of the Hourglass, however the contest is over quickly and Kenshiro advances into the city. A small figure in rags takes Lin out of the city where they encounter a Shura guard. The small rag figure removes his disguise to reveal him as a Rakshasa, an exponent of the North Star Lapis Lazuli Fist (Hokuto Ryūken) style and he kills the guard. Kaizer and his troops arrive, and Kaiser accepts the Rakshasa's right to take Lin by force. The Rakshasa says his real name is Shachi and he challenges Kaizer. Meanwhile, Kenshiro saves a boy from two Shuras who thinks that he is the North Star fighter Shachi whom Kenshiro realizes is the son of Captain Akashachi.
126	"Love Is Preached in the Century's End! Her Name Is Leia!!"; Transliteration: "Aete seikimatsu ni ai o toku! Sono na wa Reia!!" (Japanese: あえて世紀末に愛を説く! その名はレイア!!)	August 13, 1987
The boy Tao takes Kenshiro to visit his sister Leia's school for children where she teaches forbidden topics like love and friendship. Kenshiro learns how Shachi has forsaken her teaching to pursue Hokuto Ryūken. Meanwhile, Shachi challenges and kills General Kaizer. Kenshiro learns that Sachi has captured Lin and is probably heading to challenge Han, the Third General of Shura.
127	"The General of Asura, Han! The Man Who Stains White Snow into Crimson!!"; Transliteration: "Rashō Han! Omae wa shiroki yuki mo kurenai ni someru otoko!!" (Japanese: 羅将ハン! お前は白き雪も紅に染める男!!)	August 20, 1987
Shachi reflects on how he was prepared to leave Shura and find his father, but returned to protect Leia. He now plans to conquer the Shura and use Kenshiro to eliminate the Rashō, the three main rulers of Shura. His first target is Han, who also practices Hokuto Ryūken. Shachi presents Lin to Han while disguised as a lowly "rag", but Han sees through the disguise. Shachi's initial attack fails, so he withdraws, leaving Lin for Han, however Kenshiro has already arrived and sits on Han's throne. Kenshiro and Han attack each other, and as snow begins to fall, their blood stains the fresh snow.
128	"The Legend of the Savior of Asura! His Name Is Raoh!!"; Transliteration: "Shura no Kuni ni kyūseishu densetsu hashiru! Sono na wa Raō!!" (Japanese: 修羅の国に救世主伝説走る! その名はラオウ!!)	August 27, 1987
Kenshiro and Han trade blows faster that the eye can see. Shachi tells Lin how he abandoned Leia and the path of peace to begin his Hokuto Ryūken training after meeting Raoh, but is horrified when Lin says that Kenshiro defeated Raoh. Shachi tells her how Raoh easily defeated a large number of bandits, vowing to defeat his two brothers in arms before leaving to conquer Shura. Kenshiro appears to defeat Han, and because of Raoh's invincible reputation within the commoners of Shura, Shachi announces that Kenshiro is Raoh. With this news, red dye is released into the rivers causing word to spread through Shura that the savior Raoh has arrived.
129	"Kenshiro's Secret Is Revealed! The Land of Asura Is His Motherland!!"; Transliteration: "Abakareta Kenshirō no himitsu! Shura no Kuni wa haha no kuni!!" (Japanese: 暴かれたケンシロウの秘密! 修羅の国は母の国!!)	September 3, 1987
Rumors of Raoh's arrival due to Shachi's manipulation brings fear to the Shuras but joy to the villagers. Leia and her brother Tao visit Jukei, the Hokuto Ryūken master who trained the three Shura rulers and Shachi. He reveals that Shura is Raoh's birthplace and that Jukei sent Raoh, Toki and Kenshiro across the sea to train under Ryuken to master Fist of the North Star (Hokuto Shinken). Meanwhile, Han realizes that Kenshiro is not Raoh, and tells Kenshiro that he was born in the Kingdom of Shura. Jukei is surprised to learn that it is Kenshiro, not Raoh, who has arrived. Meanwhile, the titanic battle between Kenshiro and Han continues, causing massive destruction until Kenshiro eventually wins when Han falls to his death. Later, Ken signals Captain Akashachi to pick up his son Shachi and Lin, but they both decide to stay in Shura.
130	"A Cruel Prophecy! Kenshiro, You Cannot Be the Savior!"; Transliteration: "Hijō no yogen! Kenshirō, omae wa kyūseishu ni narenai!!" (Japanese: 非情の予言! ケンシロウ, お前は救世主になれない!!)	September 10, 1987
As false rumors of Raoh's arrival spread thorough the Land, a group "rags" led by a follower of Raoh named Kosem leads a raid on a Shura training camp to rescue his young son Chen and other children from indoctrination. However the ruthless Shura, Buron, puts down the attempted rebellion, telling them that Kenshiro is not Raoh. Kenshiro takes time to reflect on what happened since his arrival to Shura. Later, Kenshiro comes across the villagers massacred by Buron and forces Buron to kill himself with his own swords.
131	"Rock, the Hero on Horseback! I Don't Believe in Kenshiro!!"; Transliteration: "Bajō no yūshi Rokku! Ore wa Kenshirō o shinjinai!!" (Japanese: 馬上の勇士ロック! 俺はケンシロウを信じない!!)	September 17, 1987
The Shura Kingdom is caught in the grip of violence as the Shuras punish anyone who resists their control. Kenshiro encounters Rock, Kosem's elder son, who has decided to carry on Raoh's legend with his band of six cowboys to form the new "Army of Raoh". They are confronted by the crab-like Sheh during a raid on the Shuras, but Kenshiro arrives and takes care of the monster. However, Kenshiro is despised for raising false hope of salvation in the population. Meanwhile, Han's body drifts downriver into the stronghold of Hyoh, Second General of Shura, who swears vengeance on Kenshiro.
132	"Men Beyond Reasons! The Band of Seven Attacks Kenshiro!!"; Transliteration: "Mondōmuyō no otoko-tachi! Tsuini kōya no shichinin ga Ken o osou!!" (Japanese: 問答無用の男達! 遂に荒野の七人がケンを襲う!!)	September 24, 1987
Following the death of Han, Gammon the Scorpion plans to take his place as the Third General of Shura. Gammon takes a group of villagers hostage to force Rock into fighting Kenshiro, however Kenshiro saves them all and Rock accepts that Kenshiro may be the savior they need.
133	"Rock's Message of Death! Kenshiro, Hang on to Your Friend's Life!!"; Transliteration: "Rokku shi no dentatsu! Kenshirō tomo no inochi o uketomeyo!!" (Japanese: ロック死の伝達! ケンシロウ友の命を受けとめよ!!)	October 1, 1987
Hyoh mobilizes his forces, vowing to avenge Han's death. Rock tells Jukei that he and his men will challenge Hyoh's army, but Jukei says they cannot win. He says that Hyoh was Kenshiro's compassionate biological older brother whose memory he removed so that Hyoh would survive in the violent Shura Kingdom. Rock and his men confront Hyoh's army, but they are outnumbered, and after the initial surprise attack, they are killed. Only Rock escapes with his life, but after telling Kenshiro that Hyoh is his older brother he dies from his injuries.
134	"Announcing the Creator of the New Century! My Name Is Demon Kaioh!!"; Transliteration: "Shinseiki sōzōshu sengen! Ore no na wa Majin Kaiō!!" (Japanese: 新世紀創造主宣言! 俺の名は魔神カイオウ!!)	October 8, 1987
Jukei travels to Hyoh's fortress in an attempt to restore his memories of his younger brother Kenshiro. Meanwhile, Shachi delivers Lin, daughter of the Celestial Emperor, to Kaioh, the supreme ruler of Shura. Elsewhere Gameleo tries to stop Kenshiro from reaching Hyoh using his camouflage abilities, but provides only a slight interruption in Kenshiro's journey.
135	"The Seal of the Devil! 2000 Year Tragedy of the North Star Clan Is Revealed!!"; Transliteration: "Akuma no fūin! Sore ga Hokuto Sōke nisennen no higeki o kataru!!" (Japanese: 悪魔の封印! それが北斗宗家二千年の悲劇を語る!!)	October 15, 1987
Jukei attempts to unseal Hyoh's memories but Hyoh resists. As they battle, some memories of the past return to Hyo. Meanwhile, Kenshiro fights his way past Shura warriors and into Kaioh's castle and confronts Kaioh himself. In their first encounter, Kaioh immobilizes Kenshiro and blasts his defenseless body while Lin helplessly looks on.
136	"Little Brother Ken in Danger! Hyoh, Open Up Your Kind Soul!"; Transliteration: "Otōto Ken no kiki! Yasashiki Hyō yo imakoso kokoro o hirake!!" (Japanese: 弟ケンの危機! やさしきヒョウよ今こそ心を開け!!)	October 22, 1987
Kenshiro takes severe punishment from Kaioh who reveals that he can only be beaten if the seal of the North Star is broken which is overheard by Sachi. Meanwhile, Hyoh's battle with Jukei draws to a climactic conclusion as Jukei fails to restore Hyoh's memories. He realizes that Kaioh placed the seal on Hyoh's memories to protect himself. Kaioh defeats Kenshiro and plans to crucifying him in order to end the Hokuto Shinken lineage.
137	"Kenshiro on the Execution Stand! The Heavens Unleash the God of the Sea!"; Transliteration: "Shokeidai no Kenshirō! Tsui ni ten wa kaijin o hashiraseta!!" (Japanese: 処刑台のケンシロウ! 遂に天は海神を走らせた!!)	October 29, 1987
As Leia and Tao take Jukei's body for burial they are attacked by a band of Shuras, but Akashachi and his band of pirates come to their rescue. Kenshiro is about to be publicly crucified by Kaioh to end the Hokuto Shinken lineage when Shachi intervenes to save him. Shachi is defeated, but Akashachi and his band of pirates come to Kenshiro's rescue, pouring acid over Kaioh. Akashachi is mortally wounded by Kaioh, but reunites with his long lost son Shachi before he dies.
138	"Kaioh's Declaration of Victory! The Phantom of the North Star Attacks!!"; Transliteration: "Kaiō tsuka no ma no shōri sengen! Hokuto no maboroshi ga kare o osou!!" (Japanese: カイオウつかの間の勝利宣言! 北斗の幻が彼を襲う!!)	November 5, 1987
Following Akashachi's burial at sea, Kaioh reappears. Akashachi's surviving men create a diversion to distract Kaioh so that Shachi can escape with Kenshiro whose heart has stopped. However Kaioh tracks them down and Shachi takes a beating to protect Kenshiro. Just as Kaioh is about to deliver a fatal blow, his evil fighting spiritual energy dissipates, apparently deflected by the spiritual energy of Kenshiro's Hokuto Shinken and they escape.
139	"A Destined Encounter of Hyoh and Ken! Both Are Yet To Know Their Secrets!!"; Transliteration: "Unmei no deai Hyō to Ken! Ima da ani wa otōto o shirazu!!" (Japanese: 運命の出会いヒョウとケン! いまだ兄は弟を知らず!!)	November 12, 1987
Kaioh's men search for Lin, but she is rescued by Sayaka, Kaioh's sister and Hyoh's fiance. Meanwhile, Hyoh approaches Kaioh's fortress to visit Sayaka. Meanwhile, Shachi, dressed as a Rag and dragging Kenshiro in a metal coffin, is intercepted by Kaioh's men. Shachi is disadvantaged by his injuries from Kaioh, but is saved by a small mysterious man called the Black Yaksha. Later, Shachi has a chance encounter with Hyoh and Shachi sacrifices his left eye to Hyoh as an offering to allow him to continue. However, Hyoh detects something familiar about the man in the coffin.
140	"Kaioh's Evil Decision! Cold Blood Runs Through My Body!!"; Transliteration: "Kaiō akuma no sentaku! Ore no zenshin ni wa reiketsu ga myakuutsu!!" (Japanese: カイオウ悪魔の選択! 俺の全身には冷血が脈打つ!!)	November 19, 1987
Shachi reaches his former training ground beside a waterfall, now wearing his dead father's eye patch. When Cain, a Shura who seeks to succeed the deceased Han as the Third General finds him, Kenshiro awakens at last and destroys him along with his men. When Kaioh hears of Hyoh's approach, he surprisingly kills his own sister Sayaka.
141	"Kenshiro's Challenge! Never Be Defeated Twice!!"; Transliteration: "Kenshirō no Chōsenjō! Ore ni wa nido no haiboku wa nai!!" (Japanese: ケンシロウの挑戦状! オレには2度の敗北はない!!)	November 26, 1987
As Hyoh approaches Kaioh's fortress, Kaioh hands him Sayaka's body and tells him that Kenshiro murdered her. Hyoh then swears to kill Kenshiro. Meanwhile, the morbidly obese Gyoko, travelling in his road train, plans to kill Kenshiro for a chance to become the Third General of Shura. As Gyoko's train crashes through a village, he encounters Kenshiro who forces the train to a standstill. Kenshiro then destroys Gyoko along with his men after swears to annihilate Kaioh and all who support him. At Sayaka's funereal pyre, Hyoh pledges eternal allegiance to Kaioh, furthering Kaioh's plan for the Hokuto Shinken brothers to destroy each other.
142	"The Tyrant Hyoh and His Sorrowful Aide! Who Will Stop Him Now?!"; Transliteration: "Bōkun Hyō to kanashiki sokkin! Dare ga kare o tomeru no ka!!" (Japanese: 暴君ヒョウと悲しき側近! 誰が彼を止めるのか!!)	December 3, 1987
Following Sayaka's funeral, Hyoh has become a demon under Kaioh, destroying anyone who opposes him and causing Nagato, Hyoh's right hand man, to turn against his former master. Nagato encounters Kenshiro with the ailing Shachi and offers them shelter, sacrificing not his own life to defy Hyoh, but also the lives of his villagers. However, Kenshiro and Shachi intervene to stop the slaughter of the remaining villagers then Kenshiro leaves to confront his older brother Hyoh.
143	"The Battle of the Blood Brothers! Tears Will Never Return to Hyoh."; Transliteration: "Kotsuniku no kyōdai taiketsu! Mō Hyō no hitomi ni namida wa kaeranai!!" (Japanese: 骨肉の兄弟対決! もうヒョウの瞳に涙は帰らない!!)	December 10, 1987
Hyoh is forcing captured villagers to drain a swamp to expose the Raseiden temple and birthplace of Hokuto Ryūken. Kenshiro arrives, but Hyoh is challenged first by Black Yaksha, a guardian of the Hokuto Sōke bloodline. Hyoh defeats Black Yaksha then Kenshiro and Hyoh begin their final battle, with Kaioh hoping that they destroy each other and end the Hokuto Shinken clan
144	"The North Star on the Brink of Death! Kaioh Reaches Out for the Celestial Emperor!!"; Transliteration: "Hokuto sonbō no kiki! Kaiō no ma no te ga tentei ni nobita!!" (Japanese: 北斗存亡の危機! カイオウの魔の手が天帝にのびた!!)	December 17, 1987
The fierce battle between Kenshiro and Hyoh continues while Shachi and Black Yaksha look on in horror. Meanwhile Kaioh reveals his true identity to Lin as Raoh's biological brother and the one who sealed away his memories.
145	"Tearful Reunion of the Brothers! Kenshiro, I've Been Waiting for You!!"; Transliteration: "Namida no kyōdai saikai! Kenshirō, ore wa omae o matte ita!!" (Japanese: 涙の兄弟再会! ケンシロウ、俺はお前を待っていた!!)	December 24, 1987
Kenshiro's battle with Hyoh reaches its climax and Hyoh painfully regains some of his childhood memories of Kenshiro. However, Shachi wounds Hyoh and stops the fight, allowing time for Hyoh to fully regain his childhood memories, and the brothers reconcile.
146	"Shachi's Battle for Love! Kaioh Will Ridicule with Laughter"; Transliteration: "Shachi ai no tatakai! Kaiō, sore o oroka to warau no ka!!" (Japanese: シャチ愛の戦い! カイオウ、それを愚かと笑うのか!!)	January 7, 1988
When Kaioh learns of Shachi's intervention to prevent Kenshiro and Hyoh's mutual destruction, he offers a reward for Shachi's capture. Meanwhile, Shachi, leaves Kenshiro and Hyoh travels alone to Taiseiden temple to unlock the secret that could allow Kenshiro to defeat Kaioh. On the way Shachi finds Leia in the wasteland and they travel on together. Kaioh finds them, and quickly injures Shachi, ignoring the pleas of Leia and Lin. Suddenly, an underground entrance to the Taiseiden temple appears with light and sound that stops Kaioh in his tracks. In an underground chamber, they see a statue of a woman, symbol of the Hokuto Shinken Clan, which begins to shed tears, appearing to revive Shachi.
147	"The Fall of Shachi, Warrior of Love! Love Is Everything, My Friends!!"; Transliteration: "Ai no senshi Shachi shisu! Tomo yo, ai koso subete to shire!!" (Japanese: 愛の戦士シャチ死す! 友よ、愛こそすべてと知れ!!)	January 14, 1988
In the Taiseiden temple, with assistance from the spirits of the Hokuto Shinken Clan, Shachi makes a valiant last stand to defend Leia from Kaioh. Kaioh leaves with Lin, and a short while later Kenshiro arrives. The statue shatters revealing a pilla. Kenshiro hears a voice, and when he touches the pillar the words from the creator of the Divine Fist of the North Star reveal the hidden technique to him. However Shachi finally succumbs to his wounds and dies.
148	"Tragic Victim of Love! Kaioh's Foundation of Evil!!"; Transliteration: "Kanashiki ai no giseisha! Kore ga Kaiō aku no genten da!!" (Japanese: 悲しき愛の犠牲者! これがカイオウ悪の原点だ!!)	January 21, 1988
Kaioh rides with Lin to the boiling magma "Swamp of Demons" and site of the "Pillar of Evil", seeking to recharge his evil fighting spiritual energy. When Kenshiro arrives for their last fight, Kaioh describes the death of his mother while saving Kenshiro and Hyoh when they were children, which caused him to abandon all love and affection, embrace evil, and seek revenge against the Hokuto Shinken Clan. Kaioh and Kenshiro begin to battle, and Kenshiro surprises Kaioh by landing blows on him. However Kaioh recovers and strikes the "Shikanhaku" pressure point on Lin that causes her to fall unconscious and then to fall in love with the first person she sees when she awakes. Kaioh then savagely attacks Kenshiro.
149	"Kaioh's Disgraceful Past! The Heavens Recreate Lin's Destiny!!"; Transliteration: "Kaiō kutsujoku no rekishi! Ten wa Lin no Unmei mo nurikaeru!!" (Japanese: カイオウ屈辱の歴史! 天はリンの運命もぬりかえる!!)	January 28, 1988
Kaioh and Kenshiro begin their final battle. Meanwhile, Black Yaksha tells Hyoh that Kenshiro has found Kaioh. Hyoh then relates the story of years ago when he was chosen to be the successor to the Hokuto Shinken over the much stronger Kaioh, adding to Kaioh's bitterness. Suddenly, Hyoh comes under attack from the assassin Zebra seeking his bounty, but even while injured he is able to defeat Zebra. Meanwhile the Shura warlord Samot is looking for a wife, and comes across the unconscious Lin on Kaioh's horse. Back at the Swamp of Demons, Kaioh and Kenshiro appear evenly matched.
150	"The Final Chapter: Three Episodes Remaining! Here Is the 2,000 Year-Old History of the North Star Clan!!"; Transliteration: "Saishūshō nokori sankai! Kore ga Hokuto Sōke Nisennen no chi no rekishi!!" (Japanese: 最終章 残り3回! これが北斗宗家2000年の血の歴史!!)	February 4, 1988
Kaioh causes Kenshiro to fall into and underground chamber full of toxic gases designed to sap Kenshiro's ability to fight and attacks him. Meanwhile Hyoh rescues Lin from Samot, but covers her eyes so that she sees no-one. Kenshiro neutralizes Kaioh's ability to resist the toxic gases and they both leap from the chamber and their battle continues in earnest above ground. Kenshiro suddenly notices on Kaioh's left temple, the birthmark of the Big Dipper and reveals to him that he is in fact descended from a branch of the Hokuto Sōke bloodline based on what Kenshiro learned about its tragic history from the pillar in the Taiseiden temple.
151	"Prologue to the Final Episode! A Third Man Appears to Determine Lin's Fate!!"; Transliteration: "Saishūwa joshō! Lin no unmei o nigiru dai-san no otoko ga arawareta!!" (Japanese: 最終話 序章! リンの運命を握る第3の男が現れた!!)	February 11, 1988
As Kenshiro and Kaioh's fight continues, Hyoh accompanied by Black Yaksha is confronted by Kaioh's elite infantry in the desert. They manage to defeat the army but Black Yaksha dies from his wounds just before a second wave of the army arrives. Meanwhile the tide of battle turns between Kenshiro and Kaioh as Kenshiro uses techniques he leaned from his many battles to break through Kaioh's defenses. Back in the desert, Bat and the Hokuto Shinken Army arrive to save Hyoh and Lin.
152	"The Final Episode: Farewell, Kenshiro! Farewell, the Divine Fist of the North Star!!"; Transliteration: "Saraba Kenshirō!! Saraba Hokuto Shinken!!" (Japanese: さらば ケンシロウ!! さらば 北斗神拳!!)	February 18, 1988
Hyoh, Bat and Rihaku bear witness to the final battle between Kenshiro and Kaioh as Kaioh desperately draws on his remaining evil spiritual fighting energy, but without success. Kaioh drags his damaged body to his mother's shrine, and makes one last counter-attack, but fails as Kenshiro lands a winning blow and Kaioh finally accepts his defeat. Kaioh calls on Hyoh to finish him off, but Hyoh cannot bring himself to kill the man he once called brother and instead dies from his wounds in Kiaoh's arms. They are then both encased in an explosion of lava. Kenshiro decides to leave Lin with Bat to awake in his arms. Finally, Kenshiro rides off on Kokuoh and recalls the men he met, fought, and considered his brothers.
