= Sentinel 2099 =

- Directed by: Mike McGee
- Starring: Sam Bishop; Chris Carlson; Daniel Duff; Todd Huffman; Leon Jester; Michael Mansfield; Jodie Whitley
- Release date: 1995
- Running time: 75 minutes
- Country: United States
- Language: English

Sentinel 2099 is a 1995 American apocalyptic science fiction film directed by Mike McGee. The cast includes Sam Bishop, Chris Carlson, Daniel Duff, Todd Huffman, Leon Jester, Michael Mansfield, and Jodie Whitley.

== Synopsis ==
In the post apocalyptic world of the 21st century, the Unified Commonwealth struggles to restore civilization to the survivors of the Great Plague. A constant state of war exists as the female dominated army of the Commonwealth must fight the plague scared male-dominated Bandits of the Marchlands, who are supported by the alien Zisk. A race of humanoid clones bent on the subjugation of the human race. During a brutal attack on the Commonwealth outpost of Galatia. Sgt Chase Badham is sent on a desperate mission that may turn the tide of the war.

== Production ==
The film's idea originated in 1987. It came from writer/director McGee wanting to combine his military experience with the science fiction genre. Inspired by post-apocalyptic films like Planet of the Apes and Damnation Alley,. He sought to use his experience as a visual effects artist to create the abandoned earth of the late 21st century using miniatures on a shoestring budget. He spent the summer of 1993 creating all the miniature vehicles, props, sets, and costumes for the film, only to have a freak windstorm collapse his storage building, spreading the precious assets all over his neighborhood. With the help of friends, he was able to repair/recreate everything so that he could still meet his start date of December 1993. The film was shot in and around Roanoke and Salem, Virginia from December 1993 until August 1995. Production was not continuous, as McGee would halt production to take paying jobs as a videographer and editor to pay the bills and finance the film.

The film includes over 300 miniature special effects shots. Due to lack of suitable abandoned locations; literally entire sequences take place inside miniature locations. The shoot utilized many on-set, in-camera miniature shots combining actors and miniatures in the same shot in camera. On location in camera pyrotechnics were used to heighten the reality of combat. Unusual for a low budget picture of the time there are even some digital efx animation used for laser beams.

== Sequel ==
A sequel/ special edition was proposed in 2005. It actually began in earnest in late fall of 2008. Sentinel 2099 SE as it is now known is complete and awaiting DVD release. The sequel expands the back story and reveals many new characters. It also delves into the alien villains the Zisk. As of March 2017 a companion web series is in preproduction with fund raising being done on various crowdfunding websites.
