= New Fist of the North Star =

2003 original video animation

- Cover artwork of ADV Films' box set edition.

新・北斗の拳 (Shin Hokuto no Ken)
- Genre: Martial arts; Post-apocalyptic
- Serial novel

Fist of the North Star: The Cursed City
- Written by: Buronson
- Illustrated by: Tetsuo Hara
- Published by: Shueisha
- Imprint: Jump J Books
- Magazine: Jump Novel
- Published: December 18, 1996
- Original video animation
- Directed by: Takashi Watanabe
- Produced by: Kayo Fukuda
- Written by: Hiroshi Toda; Nobuhiko Horie
- Music by: Yasuharu Takanashi -yaiba- (performance)
- Studio: A.C.G.T
- Licensed by: NA: ADV Films
- Released: July 24, 2003 – May 28, 2004
- Runtime: 54–60 minutes (each)
- Episodes: 3

New Fist of the North Star (Japanese: 新・北斗の拳, Hepburn: Shin Hokuto no Ken) is a three-episode original video animation (OVA) series based on the Fist of the North Star franchise, directed by Takashi Watanabe and produced by OB Planning. The story was adapted from Jubaku no Machi (-呪縛の街-; "The Cursed City"), a 1996 Hokuto no Ken novel written by Buronson and Tetsuo Hara set sometime after the conclusion of the original manga. An English dubbed version of the OVA was produced by ADV Films in 2004.

== Plot ==
In the 21st century, a nuclear war turned most of the Earth's surface into a desert wasteland, which also resulted in the contamination of the Earth's water supply. A man named Sanga has built the fortified haven of the "Last Land", where he rules as its dictator by monopolizing the city's uncontaminated water supply. When he learns that the neighboring residents of Freedom Village are trying to dig up a well of their own, Sanga sends his underlings to sabotage their effort. Kenshiro, master of Hokuto Shinken, gets involved in the conflict between the two regions after saving Tobi, an informant hired by Freedom Village.

== Characters ==
Kenshiro (ケンシロウ, Kenshirō)
Voiced by: Takehito Koyasu (Japanese); Robert Kraft (English)
The successor of the assassin's art of Hokuto Shinken. He gets involved in the conflict between Last Land and Freedom Village after saving Tobi.
Tobi (トビ)
Voiced by: Akimitsu Takase (Japanese); Christopher Loveless (English)
A wandering adventurer known for his intelligence service to the people, rescued by Kenshiro when the Sanga's scouting party ambushed him and other villagers searching for water. Tobi was searching for his brother Bista while travelling from town to town. Later on, he incited a religious Jihad in the Last Land using his brotherly connection with Bista that eventually led to his downfall.
Bista (ビスタ, Bisuta), aka Doha (ドーハ, Dōha)
Voiced by: Romi Park (Japanese); Korey Simeone (English)
Tobi's amnesiac little brother known for his illusion and parlour magic. He was taken by Sanga and was presented to the common people of Last Land as a God. His amnesia was healed by Sara through acupressure though he still remained seriously wounded throughout the OVA.
Sara (サーラ, Sāra)
Voiced by: Yurika Hino (Japanese); Katie Gillette (English)
A kind-hearted female healer in Freedom Village where she heals people with a passed-down knowledge of Hokumon no Ken through her parents. She uses a healing art which utilizes the body's keiraku hikō points to heal her patients. Her life was saved by Seiji in the past when attacked by a feral dog.
Sanga (サンガ)
Voiced by: Unshou Ishizuka (Japanese); John Paul Shephard (English)
The dictator of the city Last Land, known for being manipulative and ambitious. He was killed by Kenshiro towards the end of the first episode. Initially, he acted to be cruel towards his son Seiji, but later revealed that he did that because he wanted Seiji to become stronger in the harsh wasteland.
Seiji (セイジ)
Voiced by: Gackt (Japanese); Adam Dudley (English)
An oathbreaker of the Hokumon temple, who has a love-hate relationship with his father Sanga. He took over Last Land while Kenshiro was away to the Hokumon temple to get medicine for Bista. It was revealed that he learned all the secrets of Hokumon No Ken in less than three years. Committed suicide by pressing a fatal point in his body after being ridden with guilt over his past crime.
Toki (トキ)
Voiced by: Hideyuki Tanaka
The second of Kenshiro's eldest brothers, who intended to use Hokuto Shinken as a healing art. Appears in a flashback during the first episode of the OVA.
Ryu (リュウ, Ryū)
The orphaned son of Raoh, whom Kenshiro intends to train as his Hokuto Shinken successor. Appears in a flashback during the first episode.
Kokuoh (黒王号, Kokuoh-go; "Black King")
Kenshiro's deceased horse. Appears in a flashback during the first episode.

== Episodes ==
No.	Title	Original release date	English release date
1	"The Cursed City" "Jubaku no Machi" (呪縛の街)	July 4, 2003	September 24, 2004
2	"The Forbidden Fist" "Kinjirareta Ken" (禁じられた拳)	October 23, 2003	November 2, 2004
3	"When a Man Carries Sorrow" "Otoko ga Kanashimi o Seou Toki" (男が悲しみを背負うとき)	May 28, 2004	December 24, 2004

== Reception ==
The OVA grossed ¥230 million ($2.88 million) in DVD sales, with a 200% return on investment. It earned ¥150 million ($1.88 million) in overseas sales, exceeding domestic sales.

The ADV Films' dub of the trilogy has garnered positive reviews from critics. Chris Wood of Toon Zone praised "Kenshiro is in fine form, and though the story may not blow you away, it's plenty adequate to support the action" Mike Toole of Anime Jump says that New Fist is "flashy and a little cheap, but ultimately rewarding." Chris Beveridge of AnimeOnDVD.com was "very pleased with" the first episode, but felt that the second episode could have been "much better written" and that the third episode was unnecessary and that the trilogy "could have been a lot tighter with a bit more streamlining of the script".
