= Kunihiro Kawamoto =

Japanese voice actor (born 1975)

- 河本邦弘
- Born: September 1, 1975 (age 51)
- Occupation: Voice actor
- Years active: 1995–present
- Agent: 81 Produce

Kunihiro Kawamoto (河本邦弘, Kawamoto Kunihiro; born September 1, 1975) is a Japanese voice actor affiliated with 81 Produce.

== Filmography ==
=== Anime ===
- Goldfish Warning! (1991) (Koucho-sensei)
- PaRappa the Rapper (2001) (middle-aged man)
- .hack//Legend of the Twilight Bracelet (2003) (Fighting Bones)
- Naruto (2003) (Komaza, Misumi Tsurugi)
- Princess Tutu (2003) (Rue's father)
- Mukuro Naru Hoshi Tama Taru Ko (2003) (police officer, voice on the radio)
- Transformers: Armada (2003) (Misfire)
- Burst Angel (2004) (operator)
- Cromartie High School (2004) (badass B)
- Koi Kaze (2004) (teacher)
- Maria-sama ga Miteru (2004) (headmaster)
- Rozen Maiden (2004) (delivery man)
- Ah! My Goddess (2005) (customer)
- Eureka Seven (2005) (guard C)
- Gakuen Alice (2005) (Reo's subordinate)
- Ginban Kaleidoscope (2005) (Ueda)
- Glass Mask (2005) (President Oozawa)
- Guyver: The Bioboosted Armor (2005) (Dr. Shirai, Myumelzee, Thancrus)
- Hell Girl (2005) (Ebisu-sensei)
- Kamichu! (2005) (newscaster)
- Tsubasa: Reservoir Chronicle (2005) (Oyaji-san)
- 009-1 (2006) (various minor roles)
- Ah! My Goddess: Flights of Fancy (2006) (various minor roles)
- Buso Renkin (2006) (student)
- Eureka Seven (2006) (customer A)
- Ginga Densetsu Weed (2006) (Shirozaku, Stone)
- Gintama (2006) (doctor)
- Hell Girl (2006) (Ai's father, Pierrot)
- Hell Girl: Two Mirrors (2006) (vice principal)
- Idaten Jump (2006) (Tasuku)
- Innocent Venus (2006) (soldier)
- Night Head Genesis (2006) (doctor, master)
- Wan Wan Serebu Soreyuke! Tetsunoshin (2006) (Doushin Onizuka, Sasuke)
- Baccano! (2007) (Nick)
- Bamboo Blade (2007) (vice principal)
- Claymore (2007) (Yoma in Great Chapel)
- D.Gray-man (2007) (Momo)
- Hayate the Combat Butler (2007) (announcer)
- Shining Tears X Wind (2007) (Kouryuu)
- The Story of Saiunkoku (2007) (Koyo)
- Toward the Terra (2007) (Harold, Pascal Wogg)
- Golgo 13 (2008) (Bob)
- Naruto Shippuden (2010) (Omoi)
- Appleseed XIII (2011) (Eris Embassy chief)
- Ixion Saga DT (2012) (Sebastian)
- Kids on the Slope (2012) (Sentaro's father)
- Durarara!!×2 Shō (2015) (Fukumi)
- Joker Game (2016) (Otto Frank)
- The King of Fighters: Destiny (2017) (Kim Kaphwan)
- Yuru Camp (2018) (Oomachi)
- Dorohedoro (2020) (Tanabe)
- Boruto: Naruto Next Generations (2020) (Omoi)
- Back Arrow (2021) (Burk Lean)

Unknown date

- MÄR (Bols)
- Mirmo Zibang! (hospice teacher)
- Tokimeki Memorial Only Love (vice headmaster)

=== Tokusatsu ===
- K-tai Investigator 7 (2008) (Phone Braver 7)
- Juken Sentai Gekiranger (2007) (Rasuka)
- Heisei Riders vs. Shōwa Riders: Kamen Rider Taisen feat. Super Sentai (2014)
- Ressha Sentai ToQger (2015) (Dollhouse Shadow ep.43)
- Super Hero Taisen GP: Kamen Rider 3 (2015) - Kamen Rider 2

=== Films ===
- Hokuto no Ken: Shin Kyūseishu Densetsu series (xxxx-xx) (young Raoh)
- Pokémon: Lucario and the Mystery of Mew (2005) (Regice)
- Loups=Garous (2010) (Touji Kunugi)
- Pretty Cure Dream Stars (2017) (Karasu Tengu)

=== Video games ===
- Berserk Musou (xxxx) (Wyald)
- Shadow Hearts: From the New World (xxxx) (Johnny Garland)
- Atelier Iris: Eternal Mana 2 (xxxx) (Maximillian)
- Atelier Iris: Grand Fantasm (xxxx) (Crowley)
- Hokuto no Ken: Shinpan no Sōsōsei Kengō Retsuden (xxxx) (Kenshiro)
- Epic Mickey 2: The Power of Two (2012) (Oswald the Lucky Rabbit)
- The King of Fighters All Star (2018) (Kim Kaphwan)
- Kingdom Hearts III (2019) (Gopher)
- The King of Fighters XV (2023) (Kim Kaphwan)

=== Drama CDs ===
- Mix Mix Chocolate (xxxx) (Student Council President)

=== Dubbing ===
==== Live-action ====
- Another Earth (Jeff Williams (Robin Lord Taylor))
- The Asian Connection (Niran)
- Assassination Games (Nalbandian)
- Aquaman (Dr. Stephen Shin (Randall Park))
- Broken Embraces (Ray X / Ernesto Martel, Jr. (Rubén Ochandiano))
- Dumbo (Ivan the Wonderful)
- Gone (Lt. Ray Bozeman (Michael Paré))
- House of Cards (Douglas "Doug" Stamper (Michael Kelly), Lucas Goodwin (Sebastian Arcelus))
- Infestation (Hugo)
- Joker (Comedian (Gary Gulman))
- The Last Stand (Agent Phil Hayes (Daniel Henney))
- Mad Max: Fury Road (Morsov (Chris Patton))
- Mission: Impossible – Dead Reckoning Part One (Denlinger (Cary Elwes))
- Rambo: Last Blood (2022 BS Tokyo edition) (Don Manuel (Joaquín Cosío))
- Smile (Joel (Kyle Gallner))
- Smile 2 (Joel (Kyle Gallner))
- The Social Network (Prince Albert (James Shanklin))
- Step Up 3D (Jacob)
- The Wailing (Oh Seong-bok)
- Woodlawn (Hank Erwin (Sean Astin), Paul Bryant (Jon Voight))

==== Animation ====
- Atomic Betty (Minimus P.U.)
- The Batman (Firefly / Garfield Lynns)
- Batman: The Brave and the Bold (Firefly / Garfield Lynns)
- Camp Lazlo (Lazlo)
- The Good Dinosaur (Coldfront)
- Jimmy Two-Shoes (Beezy)
- Pet Alien (Flip)
- Phineas and Ferb (Albert)
- Pickle and Peanut (Mr. Mjärt, Champion Horse)
- Planes (Sparky)
- Planes: Fire & Rescue (Sparky)
- Pucca (Abyo)
- Rocko's Modern Life: Static Cling (Rocko)
- Shirt Tales (Buzzy from "The Terrible Termites")
- Skylanders Academy (Jet-Vac and Crash Bandicoot (episodes 10 and 11))
- Teenage Mutant Ninja Turtles (Zed)
- Teen Titans (Gnarrk, Brain)
- Thomas & Friends (Connor, Axel, Dart, Paxton, Norman (replacing Nobuaki Kanemitsu), Ivan, The Third Slip Coach, Yin-Long, Toad (succeeding Yūsuke Numata) and Rocky)
- Tinker Bell (Clank)
- Zootopia (Manchas)
