= Fist of the North Star (2005 video game) =

2005 Video game

Hokuto no Ken
- Cover of the PS2 version.
- Developer: Arc System Works
- Publisher: Sega
- Directors: Hideyuki Anbe; Kazunori Taguchi
- Platforms: Arcade, PlayStation 2
- Release: Arcade: JP: December 7, 2005; NA: December 19, 2005; PlayStation 2: JP: March 29, 2007
- Genre: Fighting
- Mode: Up to 2 players simultaneously
- Arcade system: Atomiswave

Fist of the North Star (Note: 北斗の拳, Hokuto no Ken) is a 2D fighting game produced by Sega and developed by Arc System Works, based on the manga series of the same name. It was originally released in 2005 as a coin-operated arcade game for the Atomiswave hardware. A PlayStation 2 port, retitled Hokuto no Ken: Shinpan no Sōsōsei Kengō Retsuden (北斗の拳 ～審判の双蒼星 拳豪列伝～; roughly translated as Fist of the North Star: The Twin Blue Stars of Judgment - History of the Fist Masters), was released exclusively in Japan in March 2007. This version features a bonus DVD including an exclusive training mode ("Starter's Guide") and a documentary covering history of previous Hokuto no Ken titles for home consoles. The arcade version was officially distributed by Sega in North America, while the PS2 port was released only in Japan. In 2020, a homebrew conversion was released for the Dreamcast.

== Gameplay ==
While in both terms of gameplay and visual style, the game is similar to the Guilty Gear series (which was also made by Arc System Works), some aspects of the mechanics are slightly different.

=== Seven Stars of the Hokuto ===
Below each character's lifebar is a gauge with seven "stars" in the shape of the Big Dipper. Special moves, supers, and some command normals can remove varying numbers of stars. Once empty, a final "Death Star" or "shichousei" will light up and the other player can perform a special "Fatal KO" attack that can instantly defeat them, regardless of their lifebar (similar to the Instant Kill attacks in Guilty Gear). The biggest difference is these moves may be easily comboed into, making them far more practical than their Guilty Gear counterparts. Players regain two stars at the start of each round, and one star any time an opponent unsuccessfully attempts to Fatal KO. After being Fatal KO'd, if the match is not over, that player starts the following round with all seven stars replenished.

=== Boost ===
Boost is one of the many meters in the game, displayed above the Aura meter in the game's HUD. The bar is divided into three sections or stocks. Using a boost (with the Boost/Special button) allows a player to cancel a move after it hits (similar to Roman Cancels in Guilty Gear), and also shoots the character forward. The player can also Boost when not doing a move, in order to jet across the screen quickly. Boosts are frequently used to perform combos that otherwise would not be possible.

=== Aura ===
Used to perform super moves and Guard Cancels (similar to alpha counters.) The gauge can hold two stocks. The first stock fills the gauge up with blue; the second stock fills the gauge up with gold. When at least one stock is ready, text reading "GOD FIST BLOW" appears next to the gauge. If the player's opponent has lost all his stars, it will read "DEADLY FIST BLOW."

== Characters ==
The game is based on the first half of the original manga (chapters 1–136) and uses the characters as they were depicted in the 1980s manga and in the anime series. The voices of the playable characters are all performed by the original voice actors from the anime, with the exception of Kenshiro and Rei (due to the fact that Akira Kamiya was unavailable at the time, while Kaneto Shiozawa died in 2000), who are both played by new actors.

=== Playable characters ===
- Kenshiro (cv. Kunihiro Kawamoto)
- Shin (cv. Toshio Furukawa)
- Raoh (cv. Kenji Utsumi)
- Rei (cv. Isshin Chiba)
- Jagi (cv. Kōji Totani)
- Juda (a.k.a. Yuda) (cv. Bin Shimada)
- Toki (cv. Takaya Hashi)
- Thouzer (a.k.a. Souther) (cv. Banjō Ginga)
- Mamiya (cv. Toshiko Fujita)
- Heart (cv. Shōzō Iizuka)

=== Cameos ===
- Yuria (During the game's opening. Also visible in the background of the Southern Cross stage and in Shin's victory animation.)
- Lin (cv. Miwa Kōzuki) and Bat (cv. Ayumi Tsunematsu) (Whenever Kenshiro wins.)
- Zeed (Can be seen in background in Lin's Village.)
- Shū (In the background of the Holy Cross Mausoleum, carrying the cap stone to the top of Thouzer's Holy Pyramid)
- Ōgai (Thouzer's sensei. Appears during his victory pose after a Fatal KO at the Holy Cross Mausoleum stage.)
- Diamond (cv. Naotsugu Yoneda), Spade (cv. Koji Totani) and Club (cv. Riichi Nishimoto) (As part of Mr. Heart's Fatal KO.)
- Dagarl (cv. Yūsaku Yara) and Komaku (cv. Shigeru Chiba) (Juda's underlings. Appear during his special moves.)

== Legacy ==
Fist of the North Star is notable for every character being able to do an infinite combo and said combos can take extremely long to finish off an opponent, to the point that the timer might run out before the opponent is finished after such a combo begins. Said combos are often called dribble combos, as they tend to resemble a character bouncing their opponent around like a basketball. Tournaments are being held for the game and have become noted for the player on the receiving end of said combos often taking out their phones to pass time until the round finishes. It is often seen as a titular kusoge in fighting game communities.

== See also ==
- List of Fist of the North Star video games
- Guilty Gear
