= Kenji Utsumi =

Japanese actor (1937–2013)

- 内海 賢二
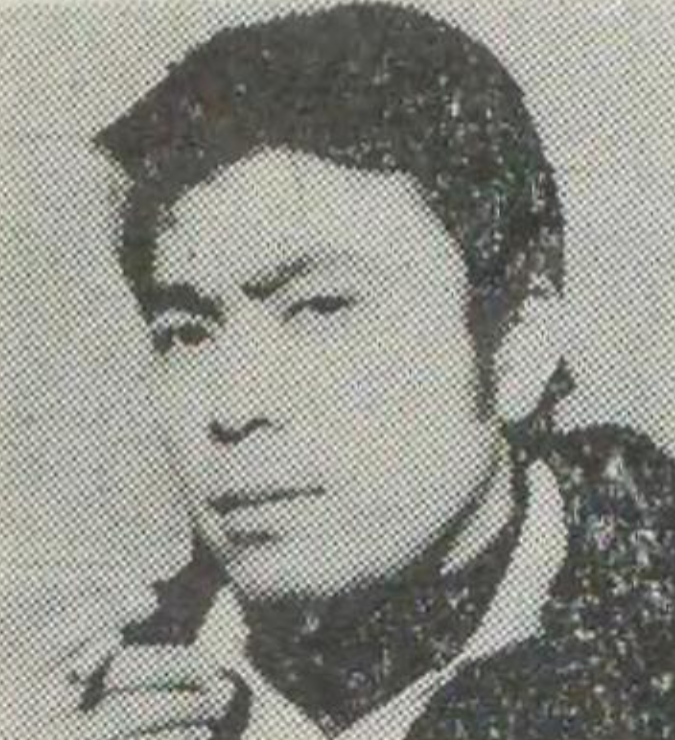
- Utsumi in 1963
- Born: August 26, 1937; Kitakyushu, Fukuoka, Japan
- Died: June 13, 2013 (aged 75); Shinjuku, Tokyo, Japan
- Occupations: Actor; voice actor
- Years active: 1955–2013
- Agent: Ken Production
- Spouse: Michiko Nomura (m. 1973)
- Children: 1

Kenji Utsumi (内海 賢二, Utsumi Kenji; August 26, 1937 – June 13, 2013) was a Japanese actor and voice actor from Kitakyushu, affiliated with the self-founded Ken Production.

He was best known for his roles in Sally the Witch as Sally's Papa, Fist of the North Star as Raoh and Kaioh, Dr. Slump Arale-chan as Senbei Norimaki, the Dragon Ball series as Shenlong, Commander Red, Reacoom and the Tenkaichi Budōkai announcer, Fullmetal Alchemist as Alex Louis Armstrong, and Hajime no Ippo as Coach Kamogawa. He was also known for being the Japanese dubbing voice of Carl Weathers, Steve McQueen, Jack Nicholson, Sammy Davis Jr., Victor Mature and Robert Shaw for their films.

He received a Lifetime Achievement Award at the 3rd Seiyu Awards.

== Personal life ==
He was married to fellow voice actress Michiko Nomura until his death.

== Death ==
He died from peritoneal cancer at 3:01 PM in JST on June 13, 2013.

== Filmography ==
=== Television animation ===
1963

- Wolf Boy Ken (One-Eyed Jack)

1965

- Uchuu Patrol Hopper (Aian)
- Space Ace (Ibo)

1966

- Yusei Kamen (Sutekkyi)
- Mahōtsukai Sally (Maou)

1967

- Ogon Bat (Mazo)
- Speed Racer (Detective Rokugo)
- Bōken Shōnen Shadar (Gosuta)

1968

- Kyojin no Hoshi (Fumio Fujimura)
- Cyborg 009 (Albert Heinrich/004)
- Sabu to Ichi Torimono Hikae (Kijuro)

1969

- Kurenai Sanshiro (Narrator)

1973

- Zero Tester (Gallos Musha)
- Shinzo Ningen Casshan (BuraiKing Boss)

1975

- Ganba no Bōken (Yoisho)
- Uchū no Kishi Tekkaman (Chief Tenchi)

1976

- Magnos The Robot (Mamoru Kagetsu, Emperor Isar)

1977

- Chō Denji Machine Voltes V (General Do Bergan)
- Shin Kyojin no Hoshi (Big Bill Thunder)

1978

- Lupin III: Part II (African National Jail Chief, Chantie)
- Tōshō Daimos (Barandoku)

1979

- The Ultraman (Daisuke Oogawara)
- Animation Kikō Marco Polo no Bōken (Jafadi)
- Heroes of Tomorrow (Director Matsumoto)
- Entaku no Kishi Monogatari: Moero Arthur (Guster, Labick)
- The Rose of Versailles (General de Jarjeyes)

1980

- Adventures of Tom Sawyer (Joe Ianjean)
- Don de la Mancha (Don Quixote de la Mancha)
- Dracula: Sovereign of the Damned (Dracula)
- New Tetsujin-28 (Space Demon King)

1981

- Dr. Slump (Senbei Norimaki)
- Dasshu Kappei (Joe Cocker)

1982

- Don Dracula (Don Dracula)
- Space Adventure Cobra (Tavege)

1983

- Mirai Keisatsu Urashiman (Brynner, Keiji Koronda)
- Perman (Don Ishikawa)
- Cat's Eye (Chief)

1984

- Higeyo Saraba (Kuro Hige)
- Twin Hawks (Akemi Hanazono)
- Fist of the North Star (Raoh)

1985

- Touch (Eiichirou Kashiwaba)
- Pro Golfer Saru (Mister X)
- Shōwa Ahōzoshi Akanuke Ichiban! (B. B. Mask, Kyouroku Ichinose)
- Highschool! Kimengumi (Yukio Hirayama)

1986

- Dragon Ball (Shenlong, Tenkaichi Budōkai Announcer, Commander Red, Senbei Norimaki, Mutaito)
- Seishun Anime Zenshu (Boushi no Borei)
- Coral Reef Legend: Elfie of the Blue Sea (Charisma)

1987

- Fist of the North Star 2 (Kaioh)
- The Story of Fifteen Boys (Warston)

1988

- Tatakae!! Ramenman (Tosatsuki Gyokuou)
- Soreike! Anpanman (Kurayamiman)
- Saint Seiya (Odin)

1989

- Dragon Ball Z (Shenlong, Reacoom)
- Mahōtsukai Sally (Daimao)
- Warau Salesman (Mamoru Kigami)
- Magical Hat (Jack)

1990

- Dragon Quest (Ortega)

1991

- Dragon Quest: Dai no Daibōken (The Dark King Vearn)

1994

- Akazukin Cha Cha (Clyde)
- Tottemo! Luckyman (Earthquake Man)

1995

- Street Fighter II V (M. Bison/Vega)

1997

- Lupin III: Island of Assassins (Gold)
- Berserk (Zodd the Immortal)

1998

- Cowboy Bebop (Appledelhi) (ep. 24)
- Saber Marionette J to X (Kamatarou Hanagata)

1999

- Flint: The Time Detective (Leonardo da Vinci)
- Angel Links (Duuz)
- Monster Rancher (Rau Leader)
- Weekly Story Land (Narrator)

2000

- Shinzo (Insect King Dokkaku)
- Hajime no Ippo (Genji Kamogawa)

2001

- Rune Soldier (King Rijarl)
- Cyborg 009 The Cyborg Soldier (President)

2002

- RahXephon (Shirow Watari)
- Ai Yori Aoshi (Aoi's Father)
- Petite Princess Yucie (Demon King)

2003

- Hajime no Ippo: Champion Road (Genji Kamogawa)
- Bōken Yūki Pluster World (Gingiragin)
- Tank Knights Portriss (Jerid)
- Tank Knights Portriss (Jerid)
- FireStorm (Carlo Morrelli)
- Astro Boy (Tokugawa)
- Gad Guard (Radig)
- Cinderella Boy (Kantarou Shirayuki)
- Fullmetal Alchemist (Alex Louis Armstrong)

2004

- Kaiketsu Zorori (Dalmanian)
- Paranoia Agent (Kawazu)
- Tetsujin 28 (Velanade)
- Black Jack (Keiji Tomobiki)

2005

- Gallery Fake (Carlos)
- Basilisk (Nenki Mino)
- Shinshaku Sengoku Eiyū Densetsu (Narrator)
- The Snow Queen (Gaion)
- Kotenkotenko (Tree)

2006

- Angel Heart (Bando Sanemichi)
- Red Bull (CM Narrator)
- Black Jack 21 (Inspector Tomobiki) (eps. 1, 3)
- Kemonozume (Kyuutarou Ohba)

2007

- D.Gray-man (Giscone)
- Jūsō Kikō Dancouga Nova (Herugaiya)
- Mokke (Rokusan)

2008

- Noramimi (Director)
- Allison & Lillia (Police Inspector Warren)
- Golgo 13 (Ledell Nikolavitch) (ep. 5)
- Casshern Sins (Braikingboss)
- One Outs (Saikawa Owner)

2009

- Hajime no Ippo: New Challenger (Genji Kamogawa)
- Slayers Evolution-R (Dune)
- Shin Mazinger Shōgeki! Z-Hen (Hades/Emperor of Darkness)
- Dragon Ball Kai (Shenlong)
- Fullmetal Alchemist: Brotherhood (Alex Louis Armstrong, Philip Gargantos Armstrong)
- Needless (Gido)
- Kämpfer (Hiaburi Lion)
- Kiddy Girl-and (Q-feuille)

2010

- Shimajirou Hesoka (Captain Kurobuta)
- Mayoi Neko Overrun! (Machine Duke)
- Rio – Rainbow Gate! (Jimmy)

2011

- Beelzebub (Kusubonobu, Wasboga)
- Blade (Tanba Yagyu) (ep. 9)
- Hunter × Hunter (2011) (Captain)

2013

- Silver Spoon (Todoroki Sensei)

=== OVA ===
- Bavi Stock (1985) (Secretary)
- Outlanders (1986) (Geobaldi)
- Detonator Orgun (1991) (Zoa)
- Casshan: Robot Hunter (1993) (Braiking Boss)
- JoJo's Bizarre Adventure (1993) (Daniel J. D'Arby)
- Macross Plus (1994) (Col. Millard Johnson)
- Shin Getter Robo vs. Neo Getter Robo (2000) (Emperor Goru)
- Hajime no Ippo: Mashiba vs. Kimura (2003) (Genji Kamogawa)
- Mudazumo Naki Kaikaku (2010) (Chairman Mao)
- Legend of Galactic Heroes (1988–1997; 1999–2000) (Sidney Sithole)

=== Theatrical animation ===
1966

- Cyborg 009 – 008

1967

- Cyborg 009 and the Monster Wars – 008

1969

- Puss 'n Boots – Daniel

1970

- Chibikko Remi to Meiken Kapi – James

1971

- Alibaba to Yonjubiki no Tozuku – Dora

1975

- Uchuu Enban Dai-Senso – Blackey

1981

- Doraemon: Nobita no Uchū Kaitakushi – Borgand
- Sea Prince and the Fire Child – Glaucos
- Dr. Slump & Arale-chan Hello! Fushigi Jima – Senbei Norimaki

1982

- Techno Police 21C – Goro Narumi
- Dr. Slump: Hoyoyo! Space Adventure – Senbei Norimaki

1983

- Harmagedon – Salamander
- Dr. Slump & Arale-chan Hoyoyo! Sekai Issuu Dai Race – Senbei Norimaki

1984

- Shounen Keniya – Gure of the Pora tribe
- Dr. Slump & Arale-chan Hoyoyo! Nanaba Shiro no Hihou – Senbei Norimaki

1985

- Pro Golfer Saru: Super Golf World e no Chōsen!! – Mr. X

1986

- Dragon Ball: Curse of the Blood Rubies – Shenlong
- Fist of the North Star – Raoh

1987

- Pro Golfer Saru: Kōga Hikyō! Kage no Ninpō Golfer Sanjō! – Mr. X

1988

- Dragon Ball: Mystical Adventure – Senbei Norimaki, Shenlong, Tenkaichi Budōkai announcer

1989

- Little Nemo: Adventures in Slumberland – King Morpheus
- Dragon Ball Z: Dead Zone – Shenlong
- Garaga – Daraburigu

1990

- Dragon Ball Z: The World's Strongest – Shenlong
- Dragon Ball Z: The Tree of Might – Raisin, Shenlong

1991

- Dragon Ball Z: Lord Slug – Shenlong
- Gamba to Kawauso no Bōken – Yoisho
- Adachi-ga Hara – Damokuresu

1992

- Dragon Quest: Dai no Daibōken Buchiya bure!! Shinsei Rokudai Shoguo – Burn

1993

- Dr. Slump & Arale-chan Ncha! Penguin Mura wa Hare no chi Hare – Senbei Norimaki
- Dr. Slump & Arale-chan Ncha! Penguin Mura yori Ai o Komete – Senbei Norimaki

1994

- Fatal Fury: The Motion Picture – Jamin Shona

1995

- Macross Plus Movie Edition – Col. Millard Johnson

1996

- Dragon Ball: The Path to Power – Commander Red
- Doraemon: Nobita's Galactic Express – Heavenly King
- Slayers Return – Galev

1997

- Doraemon: Nobita's Adventure in Clockwork City – Onigorou Kumatora
- Hermes – Winds of Love – King Minos

1998

- Case Closed: The Fourteenth Target – Nagaaki Shishido
- Welcome to Lodoss Island! – King Fern

1999

- Doraemon: Nobita Drifts in the Universe – Angle Moa

2000

- One Piece: The Movie – El Drago

2004

- Crayon Shin-chan: Arashi o Yobu! Yūhi no Kasukabe Boys – Vin

2005

- Fullmetal Alchemist: The Movie – Conqueror of Shamballa – Alex Louis Armstrong
- Black Jack: The Two Doctors Of Darkness – Inspector Tomobiki

2006

- Doraemon: Nobita's Dinosaur 2006 – Dolman Stein

2007

- Tetsujin 28-go: Hakuchū no Zangetsu – Beranedo
- Nezumi Monogatari – Alex

2009

- Yona Yona Penguin – Uncle 2

2010

- Crayon Shin-chan: Chō Jikū! Arashi o Yobu Ora no Hanayome – Mazusou Kinyuu

2011

- Fullmetal Alchemist: The Sacred Star of Milos – Alex Louis Armstrong
- Pokémon the Movie: Black/White – Victini and Reshiram/Zekrom – King of the People of the Vale

2012

- Guskō Budori no Denki – Fisherman factory owner

2013

- Dragon Ball Z: Battle of Gods – Shenlong

=== Video games ===
1994

- Dragon Ball Z: Buyuu Retsuden (Mega Drive) – Reacoom, Shenlong

1995

- Kuusou Kagaku Sekai: Gulliver Boy – Kong
- Dragon Ball Z: Ultimate Battle 22 – Shenlong
- Linda Cube – Captain Ben
- Dragon Ball Z: Shin Butōden (Sega Saturn) – Shenlong
- Hokuto no Ken (Sega Saturn, PlayStation) – Zen-oh

1996

- Dragon Ball Z: Idainaru Dragon Ball Densetsu (PlayStation, Sega Saturn) – Reacoom, Shenlong

1997

- Macross Digital Mission VF-X – Captain
- Next King: Koi no Sennen Oukoku – King Henry King
- Linda Cube Again – Captain Ben
- Tales of Destiny – Hugo Jirukurisuto, Shine Rembrandt

1998

- Kasei Monogatari – Kiwi 65 World

1999

- Yuukyuu no Eden – Orchid Grace
- Sword of the Berserk: Guts' Rage – Balzac, Zodd
- Spyro 2: Ripto's Rage! – Ripto (Japanese dub)
- Space Channel 5 – Chief Blank

2000

- Hokuto no Ken: Seikimatsu Kyūseishu Densetsu (PlayStation) – Raoh
- Bōken Jidai Katsugeki Goemon (Toranou)

2001

- Harry Potter and the Sorcerer's Stone (Voldemort) (Japanese dub)

2002

- Kidou Senshi Gundam Senki: Lost War Chronicles (Douglas Roden)

2003

- Dragon Ball Z – Reacoom
- Rahxephon Soukyuu Fantasy – Shiro Watari
- Hot Shots Golf Fore! – Z, Vader
- Fullmetal Alchemist and the Broken Angel – Alex Louis Armstrong

2004

- Dragon Ball Z 2 – Reacoom
- Fullmetal Alchemist: Dream Carnival – Alex Armstrong
- Fullmetal Alchemist 2: Curse of the Crimson Elixir – Alex Louis Armstrong
- Berserk: Millennium Falcon Hen Seima Senki no Shou – Balzac, Zodd
- Metal Gear Solid 3: Snake Eater – Yevgeny Borisovitch Volgin

2005

- Dragon Ball Z 3 – Reacoom, Shenlong, Commander Red
- Fullmetal Alchemist 3: Kami o Tsugu Shoujo – Alex Louis Armstrong
- Dragon Ball Z: Sparking! – Reacoom, Shenlong
- Rogue Galaxy – Vuarugogu Doreiza
- Hokuto no Ken (arcade game) – Raoh

2006

- Super Dragon Ball Z – Shenlong
- Dragon Ball Z: Sparking! Neo – Shenlong, Reacoom
- Sonic the Hedgehog (2006 video game) – Duke of Soleanna

2007

- !Shin Chan: Flipa en colores! – Daly
- Dragon Ball Z: Sparking! Meteor – Reacoom, Shenlong, Senbei Norimaki

2008

- Ryu ga Gotoku Kenzan! – Bōtenkai Nankō
- Dragon Ball Z: Burst Limit – Reacoom
- Pro Golfer Saru – Mr. X
- Dragon Ball Z: Infinite World – Shenlong, Senbei Norimaki, Reacoom
- Dissidia Final Fantasy – Garland

2009

- Killzone 2 – Scalar Vuisari (Japanese dub)
- Dragon Ball Tenkaichi Daibōken – Commander Red, Shenlong, Tenkaichi Budōkai announcer
- Hagane no Renkinjutsushi: Fullmetal Alchemist – Akatsuki no Ouji Alex Louis Armstrong
- Fullmetal Alchemist: Daughter of the Dusk – Alex Louis Armstong
- Dragon Ball: Raging Blast – Shenlong

2010

- Hagane no Renkinjutsushi: Senaka o Takuseshimono – Alex Louis Armstrong
- ModNation Racers – Chief
- Dragon Ball: Raging Blast 2 – Shenlong, Tenkaichi Budōkai announcer

2011

- Dissidia 012 Final Fantasy – Garland
- Final Fantasy Type-0 – Military Command Manager
- Dragon Ball Ultimate Blast – Shenlong, Tenkaichi Budōkai announcer

2012

- Ryū ga Gotoku 5 – Tadashi Madarame

2013

- Heroes VS. – Alien Empera
- Killzone: Mercenary – Scalar Vuisari (Japanese dub)

=== Tokusatsu ===
1966

- Ultra Q (Huku Suzuki Captain (Actor by:Jun Kuroki))

1979

- The 6 Ultra Brothers vs. the Monster Army (Notice Narrator)
- Ultraman: Great Monster Decisive Battle (Notice Narrator)

1997

- Ultraman Tiga & Ultraman Dyna: Warriors of the Star of Light (Notice Narrator)

2007

- Ultraman Mebius (Alien Empera)

2011

- Kaizoku Sentai Gokaiger the Movie: The Flying Ghost Ship (Ghost Ship Captain Los Dark)

=== Dubbing roles ===
==== Live-action ====
- Steve McQueen
  - The Magnificent Seven (1974 TV Asahi edition) – Vin
  - Hell Is for Heroes (1973 Fuji TV edition) – Pvt. John Reese
  - The Cincinnati Kid (1973 TV Asahi edition) – Eric "The Kid" Stoner
  - Bullitt (1977 TV Asahi edition) – Frank Bullitt
  - The Getaway (1982 TV Asahi edition) – Carter 'Doc' McCoy
  - Junior Bonner (1976 TV Asahi edition) – Junior 'J.R.' Bonner
  - Papillon (1977 TV Asahi edition) – Henri 'Papillon' Charrière
  - The Towering Inferno (1989 TBS edition) – Michael O'Hallorhan
  - The Hunter (1987 TV Asahi edition) – Ralph 'Papa' Thorson
  - Tom Horn – Tom Horn
- Bob Hoskins
  - Who Framed Roger Rabbit – Detective Eddie Valiant
  - Hook – Smee
  - Mrs Henderson Presents – Vivian Van Damm
  - Son of the Mask – Odin
  - Unleashed (2007 TV Tokyo edition) – Bart
- Carl Weathers
  - Rocky (1983 TBS edition) – Apollo Creed
  - Rocky II (1984 TBS edition) – Apollo Creed
  - Rocky III (1987 TBS edition) – Apollo Creed
  - Rocky IV (1989 TBS and 1995 TV Asahi editions) – Apollo Creed
  - Predator (1989 Fuji TV edition) – George Dillon
  - Action Jackson (1991 Fuji TV edition) – Jericho "Action" Johnson
- John Rhys-Davies
  - The Lord of the Rings: The Fellowship of the Ring – Gimli
  - The Lord of the Rings: The Two Towers – Gimli
  - The Lord of the Rings: The Return of the King – Gimli
  - Dragon Storm – King Fastrad
- Jack Nicholson
  - The Witches of Eastwick (1990 TBS edition) – Daryl Van Horne
  - Batman (1995 TV Asahi edition) – Jack Napier/Joker
  - The Bucket List (2010 TV Asahi edition) – Edward Cole
- John Saxon
  - Battle Beyond the Stars (1983 TV Asahi edition) – Sador
  - Black Christmas (TV Asahi edition) – Lt. Kenneth Fuller
  - The Electric Horseman (1985 TV Asahi edition) – Hunt Sears
  - Enter the Dragon (1979 TV Asahi edition) – Roper
- Danny Glover
  - ER – Charlie Pratt
  - Grand Canyon – Simon
  - Flight of the Intruder (1995 Fuji TV edition) – Commander Frank "Dooke" Camparelli
  - Witness (1987 Fuji TV edition) – Lieutenant James McFee
  - Predator 2 (DVD edition) – Lieutenant Mike Harrigan
- Burt Reynolds
  - Shamus (1978 TBS edition) – Shamus McCoy
  - Gator (1980 TBS edition) – Gator McClusky
  - City Heat (1988 Fuji TV edition) – Mike Murphy
- Charles S. Dutton
  - Alien 3 (Theatrical and 1996 Fuji TV edition) – Leonard Dillon
  - Black Dog (2002 NTV edition) – FBI Agent Allen Ford
  - Mimic (2006 TV Tokyo edition) – Leonard
- Paul Winfield
  - The Serpent and the Rainbow (1991 Fuji TV edition) – Lucien Celine
  - Cliffhanger (1995 Fuji TV edition) – Walter Wright
  - The Terminator (2003 TV Tokyo edition) – Ed Traxler
- Michael Ironside
  - Scanners (1987 NTV edition) – Darryl Revok
  - Total Recall (1992 VHS edition) – Richter
  - Highlander II: The Quickening (1996 NTV edition) – General Katana
- Ernie Hudson
  - The Substitute (1998 Fuji TV edition) – Principal Claude Rolle
  - The Watcher (2002 TV Tokyo edition) – FBI Special Agent in Charge Mike Ibby
  - Dragonball Evolution – Sifu Norris
- Billy Dee Williams
  - The Take (1986 TV Asahi edition) – Lt. Terrence Sneed
  - The Empire Strikes Back (1986 NTV edition) – Lando Calrissian
  - Nighthawks (1987 TV Asahi edition) – Matthew Fox
  - Return of the Jedi (1988 NTV edition) – Lando Calrissian
  - Oceans of Fire (1989 TV Asahi edition) – Jim McKinley
- Laurence Fishburne
  - The Matrix (2002 Fuji TV edition) – Morpheus
  - The Matrix Reloaded (2006 Fuji TV edition) – Morpheus
  - The Matrix Revolutions (2007 Fuji TV edition) – Morpheus
- Omar Sharif
  - Lawrence of Arabia (1981 TV Asahi edition) – Sherif Ali
  - Marco the Magnificent (1975 TV Asahi edition) – Sheik Alla Hou, 'The Desert Wind'
  - More Than a Miracle – Prince Rodrigo Fernandez
  - 10,000 BC (2011 TV Asahi edition) – Narrator
- Robert Shaw
  - From Russia with Love (1975 and 1976 TBS editions) – Donald "Red" Grant
  - Jaws (DVD and 1991 TBS editions) – Quint
  - The Sting – Johnny "Kelly" Hooker
- Joe Don Baker
  - The Living Daylights (1993 TBS edition) – Brad Whitaker
  - Congo (1999 Fuji TV edition) – R.B. Travis
  - Tomorrow Never Dies (2001 Fuji TV edition) – Jack Wade
- Ben-Hur (2000 TV Tokyo edition) – Sheik Ilderim (Hugh Griffith)
- Bill & Ted's Bogus Journey – Chuck De Nomolos (Joss Ackland)
- Cutthroat Island (1998 Fuji TV edition) – Douglas "Dawg" Brown (Frank Langella)
- Das Boot (1983 Fuji TV edition) – Kapitänleutnant (Jürgen Prochnow)
- Dawn of the Dead – Peter Washington (Ken Foree)
- Diamonds Are Forever (1990 TBS edition) – James Bond (Sean Connery)
- Die Hard – Sgt. Al Powell (Reginald VelJohnson))
- Die Hard (1992 Fuji TV edition) – Hans Gruber (Alan Rickman)
- Dune – Baron Vladimir Harkonnen (Kenneth McMillan)
- Exit Wounds (2004 NTV edition) – Chief Hinges (Bill Duke)
- First Blood (1999 NTV edition) – Sheriff Will Teasle (Brian Dennehy)
- Get Smart (2011 TV Asahi edition) – The President (James Caan)
- The Golden Compass – John Faa (Jim Carter)
- Hard to Kill (1994 TV Asahi edition) – Lieutenant Kevin O'Malley (Frederick Coffin)
- The Hard Way – The Party Crasher (Stephen Lang)
- Hot Shots! Part Deux – Saddam Hussein (Jerry Haleva)
- Jingle All the Way – Myron Larabee (Sinbad)
- Kenan & Kel – Roger Rockmore (Ken Foree)
- Little Shop of Horrors – Audrey II (Levi Stubbs))
- Live and Let Die (1981 and 1988 TBS editions) – Doctor Kananga / Mister Big (Yaphet Kotto)
- Love, Honour and Obey – Ray Kreed (Ray Winstone)
- Money Train (2000 Fuji TV edition) – Captain Donald Patterson (Robert Blake)
- Moonraker (1984 TBS edition) – Sir Hugo Drax (Michael Lonsdale)
- Never Say Never Again (1985 Fuji TV edition) – Maximillian Largo (Klaus Maria Brandauer)
- Nothing but Trouble – Judge Alvin 'J.P' Valkenheiser / Bobo (Dan Aykroyd)
- Ocean's Twelve (2007 NTV edition) – Reuben Tishkoff (Elliott Gould)
- Ra.One – Khalnayak (Sanjay Dutt))
- Raiders of the Lost Ark (1985 Nippon TV edition) – Major Arnold Toht (Ronald Lacey)
- Robin Hood: Prince of Thieves (1996 Fuji TV edition) – Sheriff of Nottingham (Alan Rickman)
- Sledge Hammer! – Captain Trunk (Harrison Page)
- Snakes on a Plane – Agent Neville Flynn (Samuel L. Jackson)
- Star Trek: The Original Series – Montgomery "Scotty" Scott (James Doohan) (second voice)
- Thirteen Days (2003 TV Asahi edition) – Curtis LeMay (Kevin Conway)
- Tremors – Earl Basset (Fred Ward)
- Ultraman: The Ultimate Hero – Russel Edlund (Harrison Page)

==== Animated ====
- Dom DeLuise
  - An American Tail (Tiger)
  - An American Tail: Fievel Goes West (Tiger)
  - Fievel's American Tails (Tiger)
  - An American Tail: The Treasure of Manhattan Island (Tiger)
  - An American Tail: The Mystery of the Night Monster (Tiger)
- Adventure Time (Narrator)
- The Adventures of Tintin (Captain Haddock)
- All Dogs Go to Heaven (Carface)
- Batman: The Animated Series (The Sewer King)
- Buzz Lightyear of Star Command: The Adventure Begins (Commander Nebula)
- Buzz Lightyear of Star Command (Commander Nebula)
- Dexter's Laboratory (Red Eye)
- Despicable Me (Mr. Perkins)
- DuckTales (Scrooge McDuck)
- DuckTales the Movie: Treasure of the Lost Lamp (Merlock)
- FernGully: The Last Rainforest (Hexxus)
- Iron Man (Dark Aegis)
- Pac-Man and the Ghostly Adventures (Kingpin Obtuse)
- Shrek series (Wolf)
- Tarzan (Kerchak)
- Tarzan II (Kerchak)
- Teenage Mutant Ninja Turtles (The Shredder)
- Thomas and Friends (Gordon the Big Engine (Seasons 1-8 only))
- Thomas and the Magic Railroad (Gordon the Big Engine)
- X-Men: The Animated Series (Apocalypse)

=== Commercials ===
- Frosted Flakes (Corn Frosty (コーンフロスティ Kōn Furosuti)) – Tony the Tiger
