= Fist of the North Star: The Legends of the True Savior =

Japanese anime film series

- Theatrical poster for Raō Den Jun'ai no Shō, the first installment in the series

真救世主伝説 北斗の拳 (Shin Kyūseishu Densetsu Hokuto no Ken)
- Anime film

Legend of Raoh: Chapter of Death in Love
- Directed by: Takahiro Imamura
- Produced by: Hideki Yamamoto; Naoki Miya
- Written by: Nobuhiko Horie; Yoshinobu Kamo; Katsuhiko Manabe
- Music by: Yuki Kajiura
- Studio: TMS Entertainment
- Licensed by: NA: Discotek Media
- Released: March 11, 2006
- Runtime: 106 minutes
- Original video animation

Legend of Yuria
- Directed by: Hidehito Ueda
- Produced by: Hideki Yamamoto; Naoki Miya
- Written by: Nobuhiko Norie; Toshiyuki Tabe
- Music by: Yuki Kajiura
- Studio: TMS Entertainment
- Licensed by: NA: Discotek Media
- Released: February 23, 2007
- Runtime: 65 minutes
- Anime film

Legend of Raoh: Chapter of Fierce Fight
- Directed by: Toshiki Hirano (Note: Credited under the pseudonym Toshihiro Hirano.)
- Produced by: Kazuhiko Hidano; Tomonari Katō
- Written by: Nobuhiko Horie; Yoshinobu Kamo; Katsuhiko Manabe
- Music by: Yuki Kajiura
- Studio: TMS Entertainment
- Licensed by: NA: Discotek Media
- Released: April 28, 2007
- Runtime: 90 minutes
- Original video animation

Legend of Toki
- Directed by: Kōbun Shizuno
- Produced by: Kazuhiko Hidano; Tomonari Katō
- Written by: Nobuhiko Horie
- Music by: Yuki Kajiura
- Studio: A.P.P.P. (animation); TMS Entertainment (production)
- Licensed by: NA: Discotek Media
- Released: March 26, 2008
- Runtime: 57 minutes
- Anime film

Zero: Legend of Kenshiro
- Directed by: Toshiki Hirano; Supervision: Takeshi Hanada; Shūichi Mochida; Tomoo Yoshida
- Produced by: Kazuhiko Hidano; Tomonari Katō; Masayoshi Ōkawa
- Written by: Nobuhiko Horie
- Music by: Yuki Kajiura
- Studio: TMS Entertainment
- Licensed by: NA: Discotek Media
- Released: October 4, 2008
- Runtime: 90 minutes

Fist of the North Star: The Legends of the True Savior (Japanese: 真救世主伝説 北斗の拳, Hepburn: Shin Kyūseishu Densetsu Hokuto no Ken) is a Japanese animated film series produced by TMS Entertainment and North Stars Pictures based on the manga Fist of the North Star written by Buronson and illustrated by Tetsuo Hara. The films are updated re-imaginings of the events depicted in the manga, and include additional details, new characters and minor alterations to some events. The series spans three theatrical films and two OVAs, each focusing on a different character from the manga. These were released in Japan during a three-year span between 2006 and 2008, culminating with the 25th anniversary of the original manga. The first film, as well as both OVAs, were distributed by Toho. A portion of the project's budget came from a trust fund established by SMBC Friend Securities, which raised over 23 billion yen.

The voice cast includes Hiroshi Abe as Kenshiro, Takashi Ukaji as Raoh, Yuriko Ishida as Yuria, and Kou Shibasaki as Reina (a new character), all of whom were live-action actors with little voice acting experience prior to the production of the movies.

== Films ==
=== Legend of Raoh: Chapter of Death in Love ===
Legend of Raoh: Chapter of Death in Love (ラオウ伝 殉愛の章, Raō Den: Jun'ai no Shō) is a feature-length film released on March 11, 2006. The DVD release of the film features over 500 additional frames of animation, as well as re-recorded dialogue by Takashi Ukaji (the voice of Raoh), resulting in a few differences from its theatrical release. At the box office, the film grossed ¥500 million in Japan and $1,258,568 overseas.

The film adapts the Holy Emperor story arc, depicting the conflict between Kenshiro and Thouzer, but introduces a new heroine named Reina, one of Raoh's army officers who falls in love with him. She and her brother Soga, Raoh's advisor, play an important part with much of the plot involving Raoh's relationship with Reina as he conquers the land; most of this portion is new content exclusive to this film. The other side of the story is the retelling of Kenshiro's attempt to protect the villagers from Thouzer's army with the help of Shū. There is also a small subplot of Bat returning to his home.

=== Legend of Yuria ===
Legend of Yuria (ユリア伝, Yuria Den) is an hour-long OVA released on February 23, 2007. It features a somewhat original storyline because it presents the story from Yuria's perspective, spanning from her childhood, including the day she first met Kenshiro, to the conclusion of the previous film, as well as certain scenes from the manga and anime in which Yuria was not present. This story is the most expansive of the series, even covering never before seen events from Yuria's childhood, revealing both her mother and father, as well as her brother Ryūga during his childhood. It also adds some details that were not in the manga, such as the time and place when Yuria developed her illness, her meeting with Rei (making his only appearance in the series), and her transition to the role of the Nanto General. One of the more notable additions is Yuria's dog Tobi, who serves an important role in the relationship between her and Kenshiro. The OVA concludes with the battle between Kenshiro and Thouzer and sets up the plot of the next movie.

=== Legend of Raoh: Chapter of Fierce Fight ===
Legend of Raoh: Chapter of Fierce Fight (ラオウ伝 激闘の章, Raō Den Gekitō no Shō) is the second feature-length film in this series, released in Japanese theaters on April 28, 2007. Nobuaki Kakuda voices the character of Akashachi the Pirate. To promote the release of the film, a mock funeral for Raoh was held at the Koyasan Tokyo Betsuin for ten days, beginning on April 10, 2007. Shinji Tanimura served as the funeral director, while Takashi Ukaji gave the memorial address. Nearly 3,000 fans attended the event. This film grossed $1,479,911 at the Japanese box office.

The film adapts the Last Nanto General story arc from the manga, depicting the final battle between Kenshiro and Raoh that led to Kenshiro becoming the successor of Hokuto Shinken. Some events from the manga have been excluded from the movie (such as Raoh's fight with Juza) whereas others have been altered or expanded. New content featuring the final battle from Raoh's perspective have been added. This film serves as the follow-up to the first film in the series, which introduced Raoh and Reina's relationship, this time bringing it to a conclusion.

=== Legend of Toki ===
Legend of Toki (トキ伝, Toki Den) is an hour-long OVA released on March 26, 2008. It centers around Toki and his relationship with his brother Raoh, leading up to Toki's imprisonment in Cassandra and eventually his duel with Raoh. The OVA introduces another new character named Sara, a female doctor who watches over Toki and becomes his love interest.

=== Zero: Legend of Kenshiro ===
Zero: Legend of Kenshiro (ZERO ケンシロウ伝, Zero Kenshirō Den), the fifth and final entry in the series, is a feature-length film released theatrically on October 11, 2008. Similarly to the funeral that was held to promote the second Raoh film, a wedding event was held at the Nippon Seinenkan Grand Hall on September 13, 2008 (coinciding with the 25th anniversary of the Weekly Shōnen Jump debut of Hokuto no Ken), to promote the film. Keiichi Nanba and Miina Tominaga (who voiced the adult versions of Bat and Rin in the 1987 Hokuto no Ken 2 TV series) played supporting characters in this movie along with Takeshi Aono (the original voice of Rihaku).

The film serves as a prequel to the original manga, depicting the one year interval between Kenshiro's defeat at the hands of Shin and their later battle. Unlike the prior movies, this film has a completely original storyline in which Kenshiro, on the brink of death after his battle with Shin and having used his remaining energy to kill a pack of wolves, was captured by slavers. After recovering, Kenshiro could escape whenever he wanted, but chose to stay and protect the other slaves. This experience further explores what reinforces Kenshiro's resolve to fight for the innocent and to bring justice upon the wicked in the post apocalyptic wasteland as the Savior of Century's End.

== Characters ==
=== Characters from the original manga ===
Kenshiro (ケンシロウ, Kenshirō)
Voiced by: Hiroshi Abe
Raoh (ラオウ, Raō)
Voiced by: Takashi Ukaji
Yuria (ユリア)
Voiced by: Yuriko Ishida
Toki (トキ)
Voiced by: Ken'yū Horiuchi
Ryūken (リュウケン)
Voiced by: Chikao Ōtsuka
Bat (バット, Batto)
Voiced by: Daisuke Namikawa
Rin (リン, Rin)
Voiced by: Maaya Sakamoto
Thouzer (サウザー, Sauzā)
Voiced by: Akio Ōtsuka
Shin (シン)
Voiced by: Takuya Kirimoto
Fudoh (フドウ, Fudō)
Voiced by: Daisuke Gōri
Shuren (シュレン)
Voiced by: Nobuyuki Hiyama
Rihaku (リハク)
Voiced by: Katsuhisa Hōki
Shū (シュウ)
Voiced by: Hōchū Ōtsuka
Rei (レイ)
Voiced by: Shin-ichiro Miki
Jagi (ジャギ)
Voiced by: David Ito
Hyūi (ヒューイ)
Voiced by: Hiroshi Tsuchida
Tō (トウ)
Voiced by: Yūko Kaida
Ryūga (リュウガ)
Voiced by: Daisuke Sakaguchi
Barga (バルガ, Baruga)
Voiced by: Masaki Terasoma
Akashachi (赤鯱)
Voiced by: Nobuaki Kakuda

=== New characters ===
Reina (レイナ)
Voiced by: Kou Shibasaki
Introduced in Chapter of Death in Love, she is a childhood friend of Raoh, and determined female general of his cavalry. Her character design was done by Tsukasa Hojo. Reina, like Raoh and his brothers, is a native of the Land of Asura. Before Raoh left Asura, he promised Reina that he would come back to save their homeland.
Souga (ソウガ, Sōga)
Voiced by: Unshou Ishizuka
Reina's brother, also introduced in Chapter of Death in Love. Master of Sūzan Senpū Kyaku (嵩山旋風脚; "Songshan Whirlwind Kick"). He and his sister left the Land of Asura to join Raoh's army and become his loyal followers. He lost his right leg at Cassandra and wears a prosthetic. After he was struck with a fatal attack by Gaiya which gave him a mere two months to live, he came up with a ruse to scare Raoh's men out of any inclinations of desertion or rebellion. He made it look as if he had allowed an assassin into Raoh's palace and Raoh subsequently killed him in front of his horrified troops.
Pluto (冥王, Meiō)
Voiced by: Masuo Amada
A rival warlord who fights against Reina. Meiō controls what was once Southern Cross and Godland.
Dharma (ダーマ, Dāma)
Voiced by: Yusaku Yara
Appears in Legend of Yuria as Yuria's predecessor of Last General of Nanto. He also served as Yuria and Ryūga's guardian when they were children. He gave his position to Yuria before his death. He originally appeared in the manga as an unnamed character in a flashback.
Toby (トビー, Tobii)
Voiced by: Yoshimitsu Shimoyama
Appears in Legend of Yuria as Yuria's pet Bull Terrier, whom she found abandoned as a puppy at the doorsteps of Ryūken's dojo when she was a child. Yuria proclaims that he bears the "Star of Loyalty" (忠義の星, Chūgi no Hoshi).
Sara (サラ)
Voiced by: Aya Hirano
Appears in Legend of Toki as a female doctor connected to the Hokuto Shinken dojo. A friend of Toki's, she diagnoses his illness and travels with him to his new village.
Jugai (ジュガイ)
Voiced by: Rikiya Koyama
Appears in Legend of Kenshiro as Shin's rival to successorship of Nanto Koshūken.
Fūgen (フウゲン)
Voiced by: Takeshi Aono
Appears in Legend of Kenshiro, he is the Nanto Koshūken master who trained Shin and Jugai.
