= Kenshiro =

Fictional character from Fist of the North Star

- Fist of the North Star character
- Kenshiro, as illustrated on the cover of Hokuto no Ken Kyūkyokuban Vol. 1
- First appearance: Fist of the North Star chapter 1: "A Cry from the Heart" (September 26, 1983)
- Created by: Buronson; Tetsuo Hara
- Voiced by: See Voice actors
- Portrayed by: Gary Daniels

In-universe information
- Aliases: The Man with the Seven Scars, The Savior of the Century's End
- Nickname: Ken
- Title: 64th Successor of Hokuto Shinken
- Significant others: Yuria (fiancée)
- Relatives: Hyoh (biological older brother); Raoh (adoptive older brother); Toki (adoptive older brother); Jagi (adoptive older brother); Ryuken (adoptive father)

Kenshiro (Japanese: ケンシロウ, Hepburn: Kenshirō) (Japanese pronunciation: [keɰ̃.ɕiɾoː]) is a fictional character and the protagonist of the Fist of the North Star manga series created by Buronson and Tetsuo Hara. In the story, Kenshiro is the rightful successor to an ancient art of assassination called Hokuto Shinken, which allows him to defeat his adversaries through the hidden meridian points.

Kenshiro's appearance and characteristics were primarily based on martial artist and actor Bruce Lee and action film star Yūsaku Matsuda, while his outfit was loosely based on Mel Gibson's costume from Mad Max 2: The Road Warrior. Through the course of the original manga, Kenshiro fights against various ruffians who threaten the lives of the post-apocalyptic survivors, as well as numerous rival martial artists, including his three honorary brothers trained in the art of Hokuto Shinken.

== Concept and creation ==
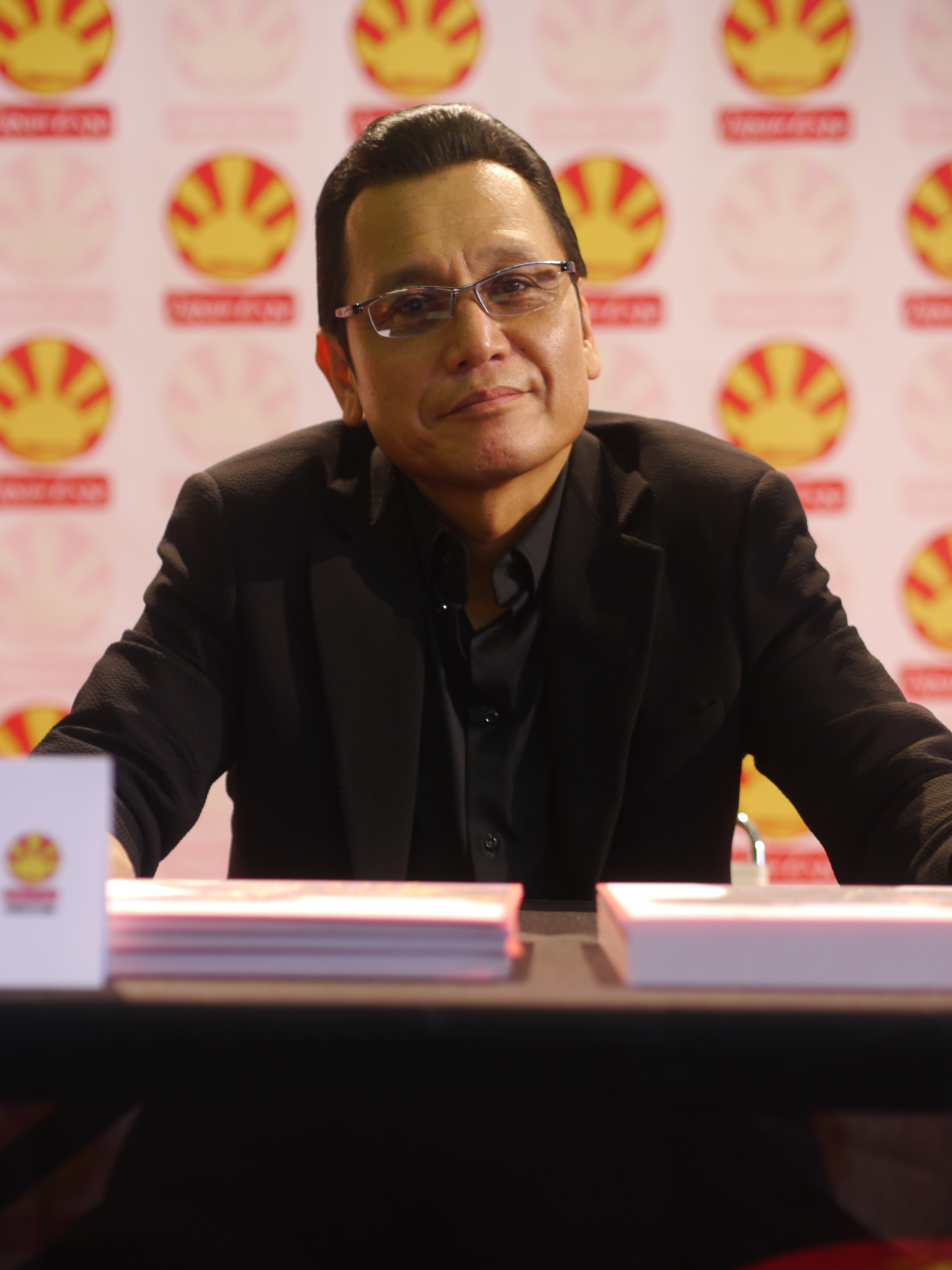
Tetsuo Hara designed Kenshiro.

Manga artist Tetsuo Hara was a fan of Hong Kong martial artist and actor Bruce Lee and Japanese action film star Yūsaku Matsuda. He combined the appearance and character traits of Lee and Matsuda when he came up with the character design of Kenshiro. Hara and his editor Nobuhiko Horie realized they needed a secret signature martial arts technique, but were at a loss for ideas until Horie browsed a used Chinese book store on Suzuran Street in Jinbōchō, Tokyo. He found an anecdote of a medical student in China, who, after overstimulating an acupressure point in order to help an eye issue, had instead made the condition worse. Horie believed that destroying bodies by attacking pressure points was perfect for a shōnen manga, as it allowed someone small to take out a much bigger opponent. The editor also derived the manga's title and the name of the technique from a Chinese constellation myth that features two sages, Hokuto and Nanto, the gods of death and life respectively. Horie pictured the manga's protagonist, Kenshiro, as the son of Hokuto.

In Hara's two-part prototype version of Fist of the North Star, Kenshiro is a young man who fights against the rival martial arts school of the Taizanji Kenpō in 1980s Japan. This version of the character has the full name of Kenshiro Kasumi (霞 拳四郎, Kasumi Kenshirō), based on the name of the fictional martial artist Sanshiro Sugata. In this setting, Kenshiro is the 23rd successor of Hokuto Shinken, preceded by his unnamed father, who in turn learned the art from the 21st successor, Master Liú Zhèng (劉正, Ryūshō). This Kenshiro is much more cheerful than the Kenshiro of the serialized manga, having yet to experience the same hardships at the start of the story. After Kenshiro's girlfriend, Yuki is murdered and he is framed for her death, Kenshiro becomes a wanted fugitive who sets out to overthrow the Taizanji organization.

The character was revised by author Buronson when Fist of the North Star was picked up for weekly serialization. Now turned into a full-grown adult, Buronson has stated that the revised Kenshiro was primarily based on Bruce Lee, and that it was his idea to use a near-future setting like the one seen in the Mad Max film series. Hara subsequently cited Max Rockatansky, as portrayed by Mel Gibson in the Mad Max films, as an influence on Kenshiro. Kenshiro's bandages were inspired by Max's and those of characters from Masami Kurumada manga. Buronson had asked Hara to give Kenshiro seven scars in the shape of the Big Dipper for no reason other than their cool aesthetic. But when they then began thinking of Kenshiro's backstory and the reason he wanders the wasteland, Buronson devised that they came from the man who stole the woman he loved.

The character is only referred by his given name in the series, which is always written in katakana in Japanese. The full name Kenshiro Kasumi was reused for the main character of Fist of the Blue Sky, a predecessor of the Kenshiro from Fist of the North Star, although his given name is spelled differently (拳志郎).

== Character overview ==
Kenshiro is the youngest of four adopted sons trained by the previous Hokuto Shinken successor, Ryuken. As a child, he was sent to Japan, along with his future nemesis Raoh and Raoh's brother Toki, to escape from their homeland, the war-torn Land of Asura. Along with Raoh, Toki and a fourth student named Jagi, Kenshiro, the youngest of the four, was trained in the art of Hokuto Shinken and eventually named successor by Ryuken. After surviving the nuclear war, he tried to live in peace with his fiancée Yulia, until Jagi instigates Shin, a jealous rival from the Nanto Koshuken school, to challenge, then defeat Kenshiro. Shin then engraved the iconic seven scars on Kenshiro's chest by stabbing Kenshiro with his fingertips and left him for dead. Prior to this event, he was more forgiving of his enemies, as shown in a flashback of Jagi's failed assassination attempt against him, in which Kenshiro chooses to spare Jagi's life after defeating him. When Kenshiro later fights his old rivals in the present, particularly Shin, Jagi, and Raoh, they all remark on Kenshiro's acquired mercilessness.

The initial story arc centers around Kenshiro's quest to reclaim Yulia from Shin. He meets a pair of orphans who follow him in his journey: Bat, a thief; and Lin, a young girl rescued by Ken. Throughout the course of the series, Kenshiro protects the weak and innocent from the numerous gangs roaming the post-apocalyptic wasteland, eventually gaining his reputation as the "Savior of the Century's End." Kenshiro's skills improve through his encounters with members of the Nanto Roku Seiken and his Hokuto brothers. In the intervening years between Kenshiro last encountering his brothers, Toki decided to use his powers in a way that brought no pain, through healing and painless attacks, while Raoh became considerably more misguided, intent on becoming the 'Conqueror of the Century's End' through ruling the wasteland with an iron fist. Kenshiro eventually confronts and defeats Raoh and is reunited with Yulia, and lives with her until she eventually dies from a terminal illness brought on by radiation sickness. However, Raoh's prior intervention has extended Yulia's life expectancy from months to several years. Years later, Kenshiro joins forces with the now-grown Bat and Lin, who have formed the Hokuto Army to fight off the now-corrupt Gento Kōken warriors. The story eventually takes Ken to the Land of Asura, where he learns of his Hokuto Sōke heritage and fights against the warlords who control the Land of Asura: his estranged blood brother Hyoh; and Kaioh, Raoh's other blood brother. In the end, Kenshiro takes Raoh's orphaned son, Ryu, under his wing, before continuing on his own, the future of humanity finally sealed with the defeat of Kaioh.

Kenshiro is also known as "the Man with Seven Scars" (七つの傷の男, Nanatsu no Kizu no Otoko), due to the seven scars engraved on his chest patterned after the shape of the Big Dipper (the symbol of the Hokuto school), as well as "the Savior of the Century's End" (世紀末救世主, Seikimatsu Kyūseishu). Kenshiro's famous catchphrase just prior to an enemy's death is "You are already dead." (お前はもう死んでいる, Omae wa mō shindeiru).

== Voice actors ==
Kenshiro has been voiced by numerous voice actors in different media. Akira Kamiya voiced him first in the original anime television series and movie, as well as in a few video games. He is voiced by Takehito Koyasu in the original video animation series New Fist of the North Star, Kunihiro Kawamoto in the Fist of the North Star arcade game and CGI short Hokuto no Ken: Legend of Heroes, Hiroshi Abe in The Legends of the True Savior film series, Hideo Ishikawa in the video game version of Ten no Haō, Katsuyuki Konishi in the video games Fist of the North Star: Ken's Rage, J-Stars Victory VS, Jump Force and Fitness Boxing: Fist of the North Star, Takaya Kuroda and Robbie Daymond in the video game Fist of the North Star: Lost Paradise, and Shunsuke Takeuchi in 2026's Fist of the North Star: Hokuto no Ken anime and his guest appearance in Fatal Fury: City of the Wolves. The child version of Kenshiro is voiced by Ryō Horikawa in the original anime series and by Yūko Gibu in the Legends of the True Savior film series.

== Reception ==
In a survey conducted by the Oricon in 2007 among 1,000 people, Kenshiro ranked third place as the "strongest manga character of all time," behind only Dragon Ball protagonist Son Goku and Doraemon who ranked first and second, respectively. A "wedding ceremony" for Kenshiro and Yuria was held at the Nippon Seinenkan on September 13, 2008, the date of the 25th anniversary of Fist of the North Star. Tetsuo Hara, Buronson, and other staff who worked on the series attended the ceremony planned by an actual wedding planner, 3,000 fans were applying for the 777 invitations that were available to fans via various outlets. Makoto Yukimura said he was impressed by the handling of Kenshiro's character; while Kenshiro kills several enemies in the manga, he is never proud about his accomplishments. In truth, he is a character who would rather never resort to violence, But, as the story takes place in a post-apocalyptic world, he is forced to fight with his fists to protect the innocent. As a result of that, Yukimura believes that Kenshiro is an appealing hero.

== Internet memes ==
In the 2010s, Kenshiro's catchphrase "Omae wa mou shindeiru" ("You are already dead") (お前はもう死んでいる, Japanese pronunciation: [o.mae wa moː ɕin.deː.ɾɯ]) became a popular Internet meme. In September 2017, music producer deadman 死人 (Noah Ryan Murphy) released the song "Omae Wa Mou" which references the meme and samples the Japanese song "Tiny Little Adiantum" (2013) from the Touhou Project video game music album Toho Bossa Nova 2. Rapper Lil Boom produced his own version of the song called "Already Dead" three months later. In 2019, "Omae Wa Mou" went viral on TikTok and topped Spotify's Viral 50 chart, before being taken off the chart after being struck with a copyright claim. In 2022, game publisher Wizards of the Coast featured a playing card titled "You Are Already Dead" in its new Japanese-themed Magic: The Gathering set, Kamigawa: Neon Dynasty.

== See also ==
- Bruceploitation
