= List of Fist of the North Star characters =

Kenshiro (center) confronting Kaioh (bottom right), as images of his past allies and rivals are shown in the background. From left to right: Raoh, Souther, Shin, Rei, Toki, and Shu.

The Fist of the North Star manga series features a large cast of characters created by author Buronson and illustrator Tetsuo Hara. Set on a post-apocalyptic Earth after a nuclear war, the story follows a warrior named Kenshiro, the successor of a deadly martial art known as Hokuto Shinken, which gives him the ability to kill his opponents by striking their secret vital points, often resulting in an exceptionally violent and gory death. Kenshiro travels the wasteland fighting various gangs, bandits, and warlords who threaten the lives of the defenseless and innocent. Many of the characters are fighters trained in various forms of martial arts with skills that reach superhuman levels.

== Hokuto Shinken ==
Hokuto Shinken (北斗神拳; "Big Dipper Divine Fist") is an ancient martial art rooted in different fighting styles dating back 1,800 years ago from China. Its founder was Kenshiro's and Hyoh's ancestor Shuken of the ancient "Hokuto Sōke" ruling line, who combined Seito Gekken's (西斗月拳; "West Dipper Lunar Fist") Keiraku Hikō with his Hokuto Sōke no Ken (北斗宗家の拳; "North Dipper Head Family Fist, North Dipper Originator Fist"). This martial art makes use of the opponents' 708 Keiraku Hikō (経絡秘孔) Meridian Channel Hidden Points, also known as simply Hikō, tsubo or pressure points). These pressure points destroy the enemy from within. The Hikō can also be used to heal and even to revive the dead. While a normal fighter uses 30% of his natural abilities, a Hokuto Shinken successor knows how to utilize his remaining 70% using Tenryū Kokyū Hō (転龍呼吸法; "Art of Dragon's Breathing"). A Hokuto Shinken successor can also resist attacks on the pressure points with the Hikō Fūji (秘孔封じ; "Pressure Point Sealing"), copy techniques after witnessing them only once with Suieishin (水映心; "Water Reflection Spirit"), move with lightning speed using Raibō Shin Kyaku (雷暴神脚; "Thunder Violent God Leg") a leaping technique which leaves indentations on the ground and use Tōki (闘気; "Fighting Spirit"), an expert user can often radiate Tōki from his own body as an aura (Tōki no Aura, or Fighting Spirit Aura) whilst focusing it for attacks. It can be used to launch ki-based attacks that can be used to strike targets, even tiny ones, like the Keiraku Hiko with Tenha Kassatsu (天破活殺; "Heaven Breaking Impalement") at long range, or, to defend the user from attack. Use Shichisei Tenshin (七星点心; "Seven Star Point Spirit"), a secret technique of Hokuto Shinken that allows the user to move in a pattern resembling the Hokuto Shichi Sei (Big Dipper). This technique allows the user to attack their opponent from seven blind spots inherent in a human's field of vision, with each blind spot corresponding to a star in the Big Dipper constellation of seven stars. Hokuto Shin Ken follows the Isshi Sōden (一子相伝) tradition: it can only be passed down from one father to one son, and there can only be one successor at a time. Sons that do not succeed in becoming successor must never practice the art again, or risk having their memories erased or fists destroyed.

The two ultimate Hokuto Shin Ken techniques are Musō Tensei (無想転生; "Nil-Thought Rebirth"), a technique where the user becomes one with the Void. This technique can only be performed by one who completely understands sadness. The second ultimate technique is Sonryu Tenra (蒼龍天羅; "Blue Dragon Heaven Silk"), this technique allows the user to create a pocket Dimension devoid of anything (Heaven and Earth are erased). In this world of void, everything aside from the two fighters' fists is nullified, and the loser is completely erased from Existence.

"Hokuto Shin Ken" is named after the asterism Hokuto Shichi Sei, which is the Japanese name as the Big Dipper.

=== Kenshiro ===
The protagonist of the series, Kenshiro is the youngest of the four Hokuto brothers and the chosen successor of Hokuto Shinken.

=== Raoh ===
The eldest of the four Hokuto brothers, Raoh is a conqueror who takes the mantle of Kenoh or 'The King of Fists', and later gains the additional title of 'The Conqueror of the Century's End'. Believed to be the strongest and obvious choice to become the sole user of Hokuto Shinken, Raoh is a towering and intimidating man standing at least 7 feet tall (in some fights he is depicted being substantially larger i.e. 10–12 feet). After learning of Kenshiro's chosen succession as the single user of Hokuto Shinken, Raoh abandons his loyalty to his brothers and his master to wander the wastelands and become the ruler of all including conquering Heaven itself. Before leaving however, his master Ryuken begs him to give up his ambitions of conquest by never practicing his martial art or to "seal his hands" (achieved by destroying/removing his hands or his mind or by committing suicide). Raoh of course refuses and kills his master in a duel as Ryuken's fading health stops him from defending himself. Before dying Ryuken tells Raoh that because of his prideful ambitions he will never be able to achieve true mastery of their martial art, which infuriated him and planted seeds of doubt into his mind. Raoh would go on to become one of the most powerful warlords of the wastelands and eventually lead armed forces larger than the Southern Cross 6, the likes of Shin or even its leader Souther (Thouser). Raoh is a true power house of destructive force, as his technique is the "Hard Fist" style of Hokuto Shinken. This style focuses on crushing blows and straightforward assaults along with energy waves that destroy most anything they are directed at. Raoh's most notable character trait both in and out of combat is his overwhelming need to always press further and never retreat, not even one step or else his pride and claim of being the greatest will be in question.

=== Toki ===
Toki (トキ) is the second of the four Hokuto brothers. He is a pacifist who seeks to use Hokuto Shinken as a healing art. Toki's self-made technique, Hokuto Ujoken (北斗有情拳; "Big Dipper Humane Fist"), is an art that is capable of healing or destroying that which it is used on, with its damaging techniques inflicting minimal pain in spite of their destructive nature. When fatally wounded with this style, the victim experiences feelings of euphoria and compassion, instead of horrific pain. Toki is from the Land of Shura, and along with Raoh, was orphaned and adopted by Ryuken, who is seeking a student to train. Although he originally doesn't train Toki, Toki showed incredible potential, and promises that he will stop Raoh if he falls down the wrong path. Toki and Kenshiro soon became friends, with Toki personally training Kenshiro in some techniques of Hokuto Shinken, sustaining a distinctive scar on his back from when he protected a young Kenshiro from a falling tree. He sustained severe Radiation sickness while protecting Kenshiro, Yuria and a large group of children. His illness precluded him from becoming the Hokuto Shinken successor and remained with him for the rest of his life.

Toki was voiced by Takaya Hashi in the TV series, Hideyuki Tanaka in Shin Hokuto no Ken, Kenyū Horiuchi in the Shin Kyūseishu Densetsu movies and Fitness Boxing: Fist of the North Star, and by Hiroki Touchi in the Ten no Haō anime series. Kirk Thornton voiced Toki in English dub of the TV series.

=== Jagi ===
Jagi (ジャギ) is the third of the four Hokuto brothers. Deceptive and evil, Jagi stops at nothing to win and frequently cheats during battle. He never really mastered Hokuto Shinken, relying on his sawed-off shotgun to finish off most of his opponents. After a botched attempt at killing Kenshiro, he is left with a hideously disfigured head as a reminder of his failure. Consequently, he hides his head by wearing an iron helmet and a section of plating over the disfigured portion of his face to control the constant pain it produces. Harboring a severe hatred for Kenshiro, Jagi was the one who manipulated Shin into betraying Kenshiro. Afterwards, he engraves seven scars on his chest in the same Big Dipper-like pattern as the ones on Ken's chest and began terrorizing numerous villagers with his gang, while claiming to be the true Kenshiro himself. Kenshiro tracks him down and easily defeats him, despite Jagi having somehow learned basic Nanto Seiken as well as Hokuto Shinken. His face finally starts exploding but as he dies he reveals that Toki and Raoh are still alive and gleefully declares his hopes that Kenshiro would be destroyed in the battles to come.

Jagi was voiced by Kōji Totani in the TV series, Chikao Ōtsuka in the 1986 movie, David Itō in the 2007 OVA Legend of Yuria, and Yasuhiko Kawazu in Fitness Boxing: Fist of the North Star. In English dubs, he was voiced by Dan Woren in the 1986 movie and Peter Lurie in the TV series. Chris Penn portrayed Jagi (renamed "Jackal" in this adaptation, unrelated to the other character with the same name) in the 1995 live-action movie.

=== Ryuken ===
The previous successor to the Hokuto Shinken style. Ryuken (リュウケン, Ryūken) was the sifu who adopted and trained Raoh, Toki, Jagi, and Kenshiro in the Hokuto Shinken style. After he chose Kenshiro as his successor, he was slain by Raoh, a feat made possible by chance; he suffered a stroke at the moment he was about to seal Raoh's fist. Kenshiro did not know the real cause of Ryuken's death, having been told that Ryuken died from illness, until Toki revealed the shameful secret during their first battle. Both Kenshiro and Raoh reflect on Ryuken's teachings during difficult situations. In Fist of the Blue Sky, his real name is revealed to be Ramon Kasumi, younger half-brother of Yan Wang, Kenshiro Kasumi.

In the original TV series, Ryuken was originally voiced by Junji Chiba, later replaced by Ryūji Saikachi in the later episodes and 1986 movie, with Kōji Totani as the younger version of him. He was also played by Chikao Ōtsuka in the Shin Kyūseishu Densetsu series, by Mugihito and Takashi Kondo (as a young boy) in the Fist of the Blue Sky anime series, and by Atsushi Ono in the Ten no Haoh anime series. Malcolm McDowell played Ryuken in the 1995 live-action movie.

=== Kohryu ===
Kohryu (コウリュウ, Kōryū; voiced by Hidekatsu Shibata) is a former rival of Ryuken who competed against him for the succession of the Hokuto Shinken. During the duel, both Kohryu and Ryuken realize that their strength and skills are equal, and that both of them could be killed in the fight. Acknowledging that, Kohryu decided to give up the successorship to Ryuken, and to begin living an ascetic peaceful life in the mountains. Raoh, after healing himself of the wound given to him by Kenshiro, challenges Kohryu to test his body and defeats him. Raoh, however, spares the lives of Kohryu's two sons, Zeus and Aus.

== Nanto Seiken ==
Nanto Seiken (南斗聖拳; lit. 'South Dipper Holy Fist') is an assassination art that is characterized as the polar opposite to the Hokuto Shinken style. Whereas Hokuto Shinken destroys enemies from within through the use of the keiraku hikō vital points, Nanto Seiken teaches its practitioners to kill with sheer force through the use of stabbing and slicing techniques, with additional styles utilising elements such as air currents to cut opponents from a distance. The Nanto Seiken school has branched out to 108 sects, with the six top masters of these sects being known as the Nanto Roku Seiken (南斗六聖拳; lit "South Dipper Six Holy Fists"), whose fates are intertwined to a star within the Nanto constellation. With the exception of the Last General of Nanto, who uses no martial art, each Nanto master is trained in a style of Nanto Seiken named after a bird.

=== Shin ===
Shin (シン) is Kenshiro's first major adversary in the series. Shin represents the Star of Martyrdom (殉星, Junsei) and is the successor of the Nanto Koshūken (南斗孤鷲拳; "South Dipper Lone Eagle Fist") style. Originally Shin was Kenshiro's acquaintance, who secretly desired Kenshiro's fiancée Yuria from afar, but knew Yuria's heart was for Kenshiro and gave up pursuing her. However, his mind was eventually corrupted by Jagi. Shin challenged Kenshiro, after destroying Ryuken's grave stone, and defeated him, engraving the seven scars on his chest afterwards and subsequently taking off with Yuria by force. He then forms the King organization and builds Yuria the city of Southern Cross. However, he is unable to win Yuria's love and after her suicide attempt, Shin entrusts her to the Nanto Goshasei for her protection. Sometime afterwards, he is challenged by Kenshiro in his lair and is defeated. Mortally wounded, he claimed that Yuria had died from the fall, then he jumped off the roof of his own palace so that the fatal impact would kill him, instead of Kenshiro's attack.

Shin was voiced by Toshio Furukawa in the TV series and 1986 movie and by Takuya Kirimoto in the 2007 OVA Legend of Yuria and Fitness Boxing: Fist of the North Star. In English dubs, he was voiced by Michael McConnohie in the 1986 movie and by Steven Blum in the TV series. Costas Mandylor played Lord Shin in the 1995 live-action movie.

=== Rei ===
Rei (レイ; sometimes romanized as Lei or Ray) is the successor of Nanto Suichōken (南斗水鳥拳; "South Dipper Waterfowl Fist"), which is said to be the most elegant of the Nanto Seiken styles, and represents the Star of Justice (義星, Gi-sei). While away on training, his home village was attacked by a "Man with Seven Scars" (who was actually Jagi posing as his brother Kenshiro), who killed Rei's parents and kidnapped his sister Airi. While searching for his sister's kidnapper, he met the real Kenshiro and Mamiya while working as a spy for the Fang Clan. Rei ends up betraying the Fang Clan and in retaliation, they track down and kidnap Airi. After his sister is rescued by Ken, Rei decides to repay him in any way possible by accompanying him in his journey. Rei decides to repay his debt to Kenshiro by challenging Raoh on Kenshiro's behalf, but is defeated in a dramatic sequence where Raoh predicted that both he and Rei would die to each other's attacks, changing his strategy to halt Rei's sacrificial attempt to stop him in exchange for delivering a strike of his own which left Rei mortally wounded. Raoh did not kill Rei immediately, but instead struck a pressure point that would drain all the blood out of his body in a matter of three days. Rei decides to spend his last few days of his life by challenging rival Yuda, who once tormented Mamiya in the past. With time running out, Toki utilised his knowledge of the pressure points to extend Rei's lifespan by an additional day, whereupon Rei manages to defeat Yuda with Kenshiro's assistance. Having found peace with his final efforts fulfilled, Rei died shortly afterwards.

Rei was voiced by Kaneto Shiozawa in the TV series and 1986 movie, Isshin Chiba in the 2005 fighting game, Shinichiro Miki 2007 OVA Legend of Yuria, and Katsuyuki Miura in Fitness Boxing: Fist of the North Star. In English dubs, he was voiced by Gregory Snegoff in the movie and Daran Norris in the TV series.

=== Yuda ===
Yuda (ユダ; sometimes romanized as Juda or Judah) is the successor of Nanto Kōkakuken (南斗紅鶴拳; "South Dipper Crimson Crane Fist"), a style specializing in long range attacks. Representing the Star of Enchantment (妖星, Yōsei; "Fairy Star"), also known as the Star of Betrayal (裏切りの星, Uragiri no Hoshi), Yuda declares himself to be the strongest and most beautiful of fighters, and is willing to betray his own subordinates for his own gain. Yuda trained alongside Rei while they were still learning Nanto Seiken and became envious that Rei's elegant fighting style was given more recognition than his own among his peers. Seeking to avenge Mamiya's honor (she was once part of Yuda's harem of female slaves), Rei challenges Yuda to a match. After being defeated by Rei, Yuda concedes that Rei is the more beautiful of the two and admits that he secretly admired Rei before dying.

Judas was voiced by Bin Shimada in the original TV series and by Kisho Taniyama in the Ten no Haoh anime series. Blake Shepard voices in the English dub of Legends of the Dark King.

=== Shu ===
Shu (シュウ, Shū; sometimes romanized as Shew or Shuh) is the successor of the Nanto Hakuroken (南斗白鷺拳; "South Dipper White Heron Fist") style, which specializes in kicks. He represents the Star of Benevolence (仁星, Jinsei), as well as a friend of Rei. Shu was once Souther's second-in-command and close friend. Some time before the events of the series, Shu met a young Kenshiro who was participating in a kumite against ten Nanto Seiken practitioners. Kenshiro had defeated all 9 prior opponents, leaving Shu as his final opponent, while Souther watched and mused about Kenshiro's strength. Shu quickly defeated Kenshiro, but chose to spare the young warrior in exchange for his eyesight. Through this self-mutilation, Shu gained the ability to see opponents using his heart, a skill which he would soon find to be his strongest asset. After the Nuclear War, Shu leads a resistance movement against Souther and his empire and is reunited with the now grown Kenshiro. Shu eventually fights Souther to save his villagers, but is defeated after Souther severs the tendons in his legs, rendering Shu unable to perform his acrobatic techniques. Shu is forced to carry the apex that will complete Souther's Holy Cross Mausoleum. He climbs to the top of the pyramid, but then gets impaled by several arrows fired by Souther's soldiers. Kenshiro arrives in time to witness the incident, and tries to save Shu, but Souther hurls a heavy spear through Shu's chest as a coup de grâce, mortally wounding the warrior, much to Kenshiro's horror. Shu miraculously recovers his eyesight and is able to see Kenshiro for the last time before being crushed by the apex.

Shu was voiced by Katsuji Mori in the TV series and Hōchū Ōtsuka in the Shin Kyūseishu Densetsu movie series.

=== Souther ===
Souther (サウザー, Sauzā; sometimes romanized as Thouther or Thouzer) represents the Star of Leadership (将星, Shōsei). The Star of Leadership rules over the Nanto constellation; therefore, none of the other Nanto successors can defeat him. He fights with the Nanto Hō-ōken (南斗鳳凰拳; South Dipper Fenghuang (Phoenix) Fist) style; the ultimate form of Nanto Seiken. This freeform style typically has no stances and instead focuses on incredible speed and power. However, there is one stance which is only reserved for when facing a worthy opponent — Tenshō Jūji Hō (天翔十字鳳; Heaven-Soaring Cross Phoenix). Similar to Hokuto Shinken, this style is taught in the ways of Isshi Sōden, meaning there can be only one master and one successor. The student must kill his master in order to complete his training. Souther is immune to most Hokuto Shinken techniques thanks to his "Emperor's Armor" (his organs and pressure points are reversed). Souther was orphaned as an infant and was raised by the previous Hō-ōken successor, Ogai, who trained him during childhood, sparring with Raoh at the time. During his final training lesson, Souther unwillingly killed his sensei, who intentionally allowed himself to be killed by Souther, as the final test. Traumatized by the event, Souther disavowed all feelings of love and compassion. After the Nuclear War, he takes on the title of Holy Emperor (聖帝, Seitei) and enslaves children with his army in order to construct the Holy Cross Mausoleum, a shrine to his deceased sensei. During the events of Ten no Haō, Souther battled Raoh before the two entered into a temporary ceasefire. Later, after his first fight with Souther, Kenshiro learns the secret of Souther's immunity and is able to defeat him. Souther uses his last breaths to reconcile with his emotions.

Souther was voiced by Banjō Ginga in the original TV series, Akio Ōtsuka in the Shin Kyūseishu Densetsu movie series and Fitness Boxing: Fist of the North Star, and Toshihiko Seki in the Ten no Haō anime series. Illich Guardiola voices him in the English dub of Legends of the Dark King.

=== Yuria ===
Yuria (ユリア; sometimes romanized as Julia or Yulia) is a descendant of the Rightful Nanto Bloodline and represents the Star of the Compassionate Mother (慈母星, Jibosei). She is Kenshiro's fiancée, but is admired by other men as well, particularly Raoh, Toki, Shin, and Juza. After Kenshiro was defeated by Shin, Yuria agrees to follow Shin so that Kenshiro's life will be spared. However, she is unable to tolerate the subsequent atrocities Shin commits in her name and attempts to commit suicide by jumping off the roof of Shin's palace at Southern Cross. However, she is safely caught by the Nanto Goshasei, who are sworn to protect her. She becomes the Last Nanto General and orders the Goshasei to attack Raoh. Ken rushes to the Nanto Capital after learning that she is alive, but Raoh gets to her first and uses her as bait for his final battle with Kenshiro. Kenshiro defeats Raoh and is reunited with Yuria, only to learn that she is dying from the same radiation poisoning which killed Toki. After learning this, Raoh manipulates one of her pressure points and extends her lifespan to several years instead of the few months she originally had. She spends her remaining years living a secluded life with Ken. That is the end of it in the original series, but in the OVA Kenshiro Den, she is shown to be pregnant with his child. In Hokuto no Ken 2, she and Kenshiro live in the village belonging to Shouki, Gento's Red General, after Kenshiro saves the village. They would continue to live there for the remaining part of her life.

Yuria was voiced by Yuriko Yamamoto in the original Hokuto no Ken TV series and 1986 movie, Yuriko Ishida in the Shin Kyūseishu Densetsu movie series, and Rei Sakuma in Fitness Boxing: Fist of the North Star. In English dubs, she was voiced by Melodee Spevack in the movie and Melissa Williamson in the TV series. Isako Washio portrayed Yuria in the 1995 live-action movie, while also providing her voice in the Japanese dub.

== Nanto Goshasei ==
The Nanto Goshasei (南斗五車星; "South Dipper Five Chariot Stars") are the sworn guardians of Yuria, the Last Nanto General. The stars of Goshasei correspond to the constellation Auriga, the Charioteer (馭者座, Gyoshaza) and each of the five members represent the following elements: Wind (風, Fū), Cloud (雲, Un), Fire (炎, En), Mountain (山, Zan), and Sea (海, Kai). Each of the Goshasei confront Raoh during the story.

=== Huey ===
Huey of the Wind (風のヒューイ, Kaze no Hyūi) is the leader of the Wind Brigade, who uses a fighting style which utilizes air pressure to slice enemies. Huey is the first member of the Goshasei to challenge Raoh and is immediately defeated.

Huey was voiced by Kazuyuki Sogabe in the TV series and by Hiroshi Tsuchida in the Shin Kyūseishu Densetsu series.

=== Shuren ===
Shuren of the Flames (炎のシュレン, Honō no Shuren) is the leader of the Fire Corps and uses the Gosha Enjōken (五車炎情拳; "Five Chariots Passionate Flame Fist"), which allows him to engulf his body in flames at will by igniting white phosphorus. After the death of Huey, Shuren vows to avenge the death of his "brother star" by setting his home castle ablaze. Shuren challenges and attempts to sacrifice himself to defeat Raoh, which proves to be ineffective.

Shuren was voiced by Norio Wakamoto in the TV series and by Nobuyuki Hiyama in the Shin Kyūseishu Densetsu series.

=== Juza ===
Juza of the Clouds (雲のジュウザ, Kumo no Jūza) is the childhood rival of Raoh and a martial art prodigy who uses a self-styled martial art (我流の拳, Garyū no Ken) that suits his free-spirited personality. A childhood friend of Yuria, Juza was deeply in love with Yuria, however his dreams of such a relationship were shattered when he learned that he was actually the older half-brother of Yuria (being conceived from an extramarital affair). Afterwards, Juza began living a care-free life of promiscuity and wandered the land fighting opponents alone, indifferent to the cause of the other Goshasei until he learns the true identity of the Last Nanto General. Juza challenges Raoh to a fight and manages to stall him for a while by stealing his steed, Kokuoh, but is eventually defeated in one of Raoh's most grueling battles. Juza states during the fight that his body moves 'by will alone', and this is true; despite supposedly being killed by Raoh, his lifeless body pulls itself upright and manages to wound Raoh with a single punch before falling to a final blow. Humbled by Juza's courage, Raoh orders his men to give Juza a respectful burial.

Juza was voiced by Yoshito Yasuhara in the original TV series and by Keiji Fujiwara and Shintaro Asanuma in the Ten no Haō anime. Mark Laskowski voices Juza in the English dub of Legends of the Dark King.

=== Fudo ===
Fudo of the Mountains (山のフドウ, Yama no Fudō) is a giant warrior who uses his huge size and brute strength to crush his enemies. Fudo was once a ruthless bandit known as Fudo the Ogre (悪鬼のフドウ, Akki no Fudō), whose presence terrified a young Raoh when he invaded the Hokuto Shinken dojo at one point. However, a young Yuria stood up to Fudo's rampage and taught him the value of life. Fudo became a gentle giant, and later began raising several orphaned children as a foster father. Fudo befriends Kenshiro and his companions in order to lead them to the Nanto Capital, and eventually reveals the Last General's true identity to Ken. Raoh later challenges Fudo in order to overcome his fear against Ken. In order to cast off his fears, Raoh draws a line behind him, and insists that if he steps backwards over the line, his troops are to kill him for his cowardice. Despite heavy injuries during the fight, Fudo manages to make Raoh step back, but Raoh's men impale Fudo with several large lances and arrows, mortally wounding him. The injuries soon kill him. Enraged by the actions of his own men, Raoh turns and angrily states that it was he who should have been killed, not Fudo. He then sends his entire army running in fear.

Fudo was voiced by Shōzō Iizuka in the TV series and Daisuke Gōri in the Shin Kyūseishu Densetsu series.

=== Rihaku ===
Rihaku of the Ocean (海のリハク, Umi no Rihaku) is the leader and military strategist of the Goshasei, specializing in setting up boobytraps. Rihaku encounters Raoh and is beaten, but survives due to Kenshiro's intervention, making him the sole survivor of the group (including his daughter Toh, who commits suicide). He later becomes the senior strategist of Bat and Lin's Hokuto Army, by then he is using a cane; implying his skills have decreased. It's also revealed he has a vast knowledge and history concerning not only Hokuto and Nanto, but Gento and the Shura.

Rihaku was voiced by Takeshi Aono in the TV series and Katsuhisa Houki in the Shin Kyūseishu Densetsu series.

== Gento Koken ==
Gento Kōken (元斗皇拳; "Original Dipper Imperial Fist") is a martial art practiced by the sworn guardians of the Celestial Emperor (天帝, Tentei). The style focuses on use of ki energy, usually projected outwards as a blast, blade or beam, or sometimes as an energy shield. It transforms ki into condensed light and uses it like a blade to destroy the opponent's body on a cellular level. Their symbol is the Tenteisei (天帝星), also known as the Polaris (大極星, Taikyokusei).

In the manga, there were only two Gento practitioners in the story, Falco and Solia. The anime establishes Shoki as a third Gento practitioners, and introduces two additional fighters (Taiga and Boltz). The five warriors are distinguished by the colors that their aura radiate.

=== Falco ===
Falco (ファルコ, Faruko; voiced by Hideyuki Tanaka) is the successor of Gento Kōken. Falco once confronted Raoh in the past when his army came to invade the Celestial Emperor's village, but the two came to a truce when Falco amputated his right leg (later replaced by a prosthetic) as a peace offering. Falco is later blackmailed by Jaco to do his evil bidding when he locks away Lui, the current Celestial Emperor, and is forced to fight against Kenshiro. After Lui is rescued by Bat and Ein, Falco turns against Jaco and kills him. He later sails to the Land of Shura to rescue Lin, only to be attacked by the Nameless Shura. Although he is gravely wounded, he and Kenshiro succeed in defeating the Nameless Shura, with Falco dying of his wounds soon afterwards.

=== Solia ===
Solia (ソリア, Soria) Voiced by: Michihiro Ikemizu. A general of the Celestial Emperor's Army. A protegee of Falco also trained in Gento Kōken, Solia lost his right eye to Falco during a sparring match. He challenges Kenshiro and is defeated.

=== Shoki ===
Shoki (ショウキ, Shōki; Voiced by: Tessho Genda) is a general in the Celestial Lord's army and friend of Falco. Shoki befriended Kenshiro in the past, who was traveling with an ill Yuria, and allowed the two to live in his village until Yuria's death. When they first met, he refused to reveal his real name to Kenshiro, fearing that they might face off as enemies one day. Years later, Shoki revolts against Jaco and attempts to sneak out of the Imperial Capital with the help of Falco, only to be killed by Shieno (Boltz in the TV series).

== Hokuto Ryuken ==
Hokuto Ryūken (北斗琉拳; Big Dipper Lapis Lazuli Fist) is a fighting style which branched off from the main Hokuto family along with Hokuto Shinken that was founded by Shuken's cousin Ryūō. The style uses the 1109 destructive points of the human body called the Keiraku Hakō (経絡破孔; lit. 'Destructive Meridian Points') in contrast to the 708 Keiraku Hikō points of the Shin Ken style (The exact differences between the Ryūken style's hakō points and the Shin Ken style's hikō points are never fully explained) as well as a form of Demonic energy called Matōki no Aura (魔闘気のオーラ; "Demonic Fighting Spirit Aura") that stems from the Demonic realm. This energy gives the practitioner God-like strength but at the cost of driving its practitioners insane with evil, turning them into a Majin (魔神, "Demon God") devoid of any positive emotions, allowing them to kill their Kin without a single shred of regret. The three Rashō (羅将; "Generals of Shura") that Kenshiro faces are all masters of this art. The ultimate Hokuto Ryuken technique is Anryū Tenha (暗琉天破; "Dark Gem Heaven Destruction") which warps space-time around the opponent while simultaneously nullifying gravity, leaving the opponent completely disoriented.

=== Kaioh ===
Kaioh (カイオウ, Kaiō; voiced by Kenji Utsumi) is the First General of Shura (第一の羅将, Dai-ichi no Rashō). He proclaims himself to be the Creator of the New Century (新世紀創造主, Shin Seiki Sōzōshu) and the Demon God Kaioh (魔神カイオウ, Majin Kaiō). Kaioh is the elder blood brother of Raoh and Toki, who remained in Shura after his brothers left the country when they were children. He bears a strong resemblance to Raoh, but a bit taller, paler complexion, and an upside-down Y-shaped scar on his face. Kaioh is characterized as the strongest warrior of Shura and is the only other character alongside Shin and Souther to brutally defeat Kenshiro following their initial encounter. He wears a specially constructed armor that allows him to control his magical aura, but can easily burn it off when he unleashes all his Matoki. He hates the main Hokuto bloodline, from which Ken and Hyoh are descended, due to the fact that he was forced to play a subordinate role to Hyoh by Jukei, despite being a more gifted warrior. His hatred was furthered after the death of his mother, who died saving Kenshiro and Hyoh. Kaioh is the last major villain in the manga (there are others after him) and the final opponent Kenshiro faces in the TV series.

=== Hyoh ===
Hyoh (ヒョウ, Hyō; voiced by Shinji Ogawa) is the Second General of Shura (第二の羅将, Daini no Rashō). He is a descendant of the main Hokuto bloodline and Kenshiro's biological older brother. After being separated from Ken as a child, his memories were sealed away by Jukei, the scar on his forehead being the result of this. Hyoh was favored by Jukei over Kaioh due to his bloodline, but plays a subordinate role to Kaioh in the present. Unlike Kaioh, Hyoh is initially portrayed as a more benevolent ruler until he is beset by grief and turns evil from the trauma of Sayaka's death. He returns to his normal self after fighting Ken and regains his lost memories. Following the fight, Hyoh rescues Rin from the Warriors of Shura while Ken fights against Kaioh. After his memories were restored, he realizes what Jukei has done during his training, understanding Kaioh's pain, ultimately taking full responsibility for Kaioh's actions. Badly injured during the battle against Kaioh's forces, he manages to reach Kenshiro and Kaioh just in time to see their battle conclude before dying in Kaioh's arms.

=== Han ===
Han (ハン; voiced by Koji Totani) is the Third General of Shura (第三の羅将, Daisan no Rashō) and the first of the Hokuto Ryūken masters Kenshiro faces in Shura. Han uses a personal fighting style called Mabo Koso (魔舞紅薬, Magical crimson dance) which allows him to move his fists so fast, they don't even cast a shadow. He reveals Kenshiro's origin at the land of Shura during their battle; implying he knew Kenshiro was Hyoh's brother and pleaded with him to leave Shura before ultimately dying from his wounds. After being killed, his body drifts from the blood-soiled lake into Hyoh's castle, who swears to avenge Han's death.

=== Shachi ===
Shachi (シャチ; lit. "Orca," voiced by Hirotaka Suzuoki) is the son of Akashachi, the pirate. As a child, he met and began to admire Raoh while his father worked under his command. On one adventure, his father's crew was attacked by Shura Warriors (it is implied it was Kaioh's army); the result being left behind in Shura after Akashachi and his remaining men fled during an attack. There, he became romantically involved with Leia, a local girl. He soon became Jukei's fourth student and learned Hokuto Ryūken to protect Leia. He began fighting against the Shuras, eventually earning a reputation as "Rakshasa." At first, he only teams up with Ken to use him in his plot to destroy the three "Rashō," offering Rin to Han so that Ken would fight him. After he is reunited with Akashachi before his death, Shachi becomes a loyal ally to Ken, sacrificing his left eye to Hyoh so that Ken would not be captured. He helps Ken restore Hyoh's memories, but later dies after being mortally wounded while fighting against Kaioh himself.

=== Jukei ===
Jukei (ジュウケイ, Jūkei; voiced by Kōhei Miyauchi) is the Hokuto Ryūken master who trained the three Rashō and Shachi. In the past, he went through a demonic possession as a result of his misuse of his style, killing his wife and child, but was rescued by Ryuken. He then trained Kaioh and Hyoh, sealing Hyoh's memories of Kenshiro and his knowledge of the original Hokuto style. The main reason for the training Kaioh, Hyoh, and Han the art because Shura needed defenders of the land and each had qualities that prevented them from learning Hokuto Shinken; Kaioh was filled with hatred, while Hyoh was emotionally attached to his brother; despite knowing the risks involved, he taught Hokuto Ryuken in order to buy time so a Hokuto Shinken successor will return to Shura (expecting it would be Raoh). In the present, he forms part of Leia's resistance, after Hokuto Ryuken has corrupted his students, and attempts to undo the seal to prevent the two brothers of the Hokuto Soke from destroying each other, which would result in the absolute destruction of the Hokuto Soke bloodline. However, Hyoh's seal was compromised by Kaioh, and any attempt to restore Hyoh's memory was lost. Realizing what Kaioh has done, Hyoh gives the mortal blow; dying, Jukei would regret his past deeds as his mistakes may doom the whole world.

In Souten no Ken, he appears as an orphaned child belonging to the Hokuto Ryūkaken.

== Other main characters ==
=== Bat ===
Bat (バット, Batto; sometimes romanized as Bart) is a young boy who accompanies Kenshiro in his journey. Bat left his home village to fend for himself so that his adoptive mother Toyo could take better care of her other orphans. He was eventually imprisoned in Lin's home village for trying to steal food and was locked in the same cell as Kenshiro, where the two met for the first time. After escaping, Bat decides to follow Kenshiro as his self-appointed sidekick, hoping to use Ken's strength to gain food for himself, but gradually matures as he witnesses the many tragic events, including the death of his adoptive mother. He grows up and forms the Hokuto Army with Rin to fight the Heavenly Emperor's Army, becoming a wanted fugitive. As a young adult, Bat has rudimentary martial art skills, along with limited knowledge of Hokuto Shinken. At the end of the manga, Bat gives up on his love for Rin so she and Kenshiro could get married and finally, live the happy life they deserve so much. He presses Lin's pressure points to make her forget about him and manages to reunite Rin with an also amnesiac Ken, but fate forces him to pose as Ken in order to fight against Bolge, a blind and dangerous thug with a grudge against Ken. Bat is captured and horribly tortured by Bolge, but does his best to leave a convincing impersonation of Ken, hoping that with his death, the real Ken gets declared officially dead and future thugs leave him alone. Just before Bat's death, the real Ken rescues him and defeats the entire thug gang, moved by Bat's ultimate sacrifice. Rin decides to stay behind and guard Bat's grave forever, only to discover that Ken managed to revive Bat by pressing a hidden pressure point. In his final panels, Rin is happily hugging a fully revived, yet still unconscious Bat.

Bat was voiced by Mie Suzuki (as a child) and Keiichi Nanba (as an adult) in the original TV series, by Daisuke Namikawa in the Shin Kyūseishu Densetsu films, by Ayumi Tsunematsu in the arcade game by Sega, by Junya Enoki in Fitness Boxing: Fist of the North Star. In English dubbed versions, Bat was voiced by Tony Oliver in 1986 movie and by Gary Dubin in the TV series. He was played by Dante Basco in the 1995 live-action movie.

=== Rin ===
Rin (リン, Rin; sometimes romanized as Lynn or Lin) is a young orphaned girl who befriends Kenshiro while working as jailer in the village where Kenshiro and Bat also met. After Kenshiro helps her recover her voice (having been traumatized in the past, witnessing bandits slaughter her family) and rescues her from the clutches of Zeed's gang, Rin decides to follow "Ken" and eventually finds him, joining him in his journey. Rin flowers into womanhood, and forms the Hokuto Army to rebel against the Heavenly Emperor's Army. She later learns that she is actually the twin sister of Lui, the current Empress, and was secretly given up for adoption by Falco after he was given orders to kill one of them.

Rin was voiced by Tomiko Suzuki (as a child) and Miina Tominaga (as an adult) in the original TV series and 1986 movie, by Maaya Sakamoto in the Shin Kyūseishu Densetsu series, by Miwa Kouzuki in the fighting game version by Sega, and by Ryōko Maekawa in Fitness Boxing: Fist of the North Star. In English dubbed versions, she was voiced by Holly Sidel in the 1986 movie and by Sandy Fox in the TV series. Rin (as Lynn) was played by Nalona Herron in the 1995 live action film.

=== Mamiya ===
Mamiya (マミヤ) is a female village leader who bears resemblance to Kenshiro's fiancée, Yuria. She has limited skill in the martial arts, and uses weapons such as bladed yo-yos, bow and arrows, and emeici in combat. In the past, Yuda slaughtered Mamiya's parents and kidnapped her with the intent to make her his concubine, branding her with the "UD" mark on her back. She eventually managed to escape, and in her humiliation, renounced her womanhood and became a warrior. Mamiya recruits Ken and Rei as guardians of her village and later accompanies the two for several arcs of the story.

During the trio's time together, Mamiya, due to her similar attributes with Yuria, feelings for Kenshiro, though he does not acknowledge it; she also becomes the object of Rei's affections. However, burdened by the shame of her past, she is never able to express her love in return. In order that she would never forget him, Rei uses his final living days to challenge Yuda, whom he defeats and avenges the crimes that Judas committed against Mamiya in the past. Moved by his sacrifice on her behalf, Mamiya is able to re-embrace her womanhood, renouncing her life as a warrior. Following Rei's death, she only makes sporadic appearances through the remainder of the manga. She reappears in Episode 114 of the sequel TV series.

Mamiya was voiced by Toshiko Fujita in the series, Naomi Shindō in the video game Fist of the North Star: Ken's Rage, and Karin Nanami in Fitness Boxing: Fist of the North Star. In English dubbed version of the TV Series she is voiced by Mary Elizabeth McGlynn, and in Ken's Rage, she was voiced by Laura Bailey.

=== Airi ===
Airi (アイリ; sometimes romanized as Ailee or Iris, voiced by Arisa Andō) is Rei's younger sister, who was kidnapped by Jagi on the day of her wedding and then sold to slavery. The Fang Clan managed to get a hold of her after killing her previous captor and used her as leverage against Rei. Such was Airi's suffering at the hands of the Fang Clan that she blinded herself in despair. Rei rescued her with the help of Kenshiro, who restored her eyesight. She remains in Mamiya's village and gains the courage to stand up and defend herself with the help of Rin when Kenoh's army invades the village. Like Mamiya, Airi reappears in Episode 114 of the sequel TV series.

=== Ryuga ===
Ryuga (リュウガ, Ryūga; sometimes romanized as Lewgar) is the elder brother of Yuria and the older half-brother of Juza. He is the successor of the Taizan Tenrōken (泰山天狼拳; "Mt. Tai Celestial Wolf Fist") style, which allows him to scoop out chunks of his enemies' flesh while leaving them with a feeling of coldness. He represents the solitary star of Sirius (天狼星, Tenrōsei; The Heavenly Wolf Star), which is neither part of the Hokuto nor Nanto constellations. After the nuclear war, Ryuga pledges his loyalty to Raoh, believing that his tyranny will restore order to the world. However, he begins to doubt Raoh's methods when he meets his sister's fiancée Kenshiro, the other Hokuto Shinken master. Ryuga decides to challenge Kenshiro by kidnapping Toki and keeping him captive in his castle. Kenshiro defeats him, only to find out that Ryuga was already dying, having slit his own stomach before the battle. He shows Kenshiro the locket of Yuria, whom he holds dear, and realizes Yuria has made the right decision by choosing Kenshiro before dying.

Ryuga was voiced by Hideyuki Hori in the original TV series, Daisuke Sakaguchi (as a child) in the Shin Kyūseishu Densetsu series, and by Daisuke Matsubara in the Ten no Haoh anime series. John Swasey voices him in the English dub of Legends of the Dark King.

=== Ein ===
Ein (アイン, Ain; voiced by Ken Yamaguchi) is a famed tracker and a bounty hunter who fights with an unorthodox brawling style (ケンカ拳法, Kenka Kenpō). He is hired to capture Kenshiro, but after a brief fight with Ken, he begins to respect him. He has a daughter named Asuka, who he protects with his very life and is the reason why he earns money. He sacrifices his own life to save Bat, Mew, Rin and Lui from a flooding cell. Kenshiro is given Ein's gloves by Asuka after his death in which he was seen wearing throughout the rest of the series, until it is finally destroyed in his showdown with Han.

=== Harn Bros ===
Harn Brothers (ハーン兄弟, Hān Kyōdai)
Voiced by: Daisuke Gouri (Buzz) and Yutaka Shimaka (Gill)
Buzz (バズ, Bazu) and Gill (ギル, Giru) are two dangerous brothers that were captured by Ein in the past through luck and wit (ironically they would be rescued by Ein and Kenshiro). They are masters of Nanto Sōyōken (南斗双鷹拳; "South Dipper Twin Hawk Fist") and have a grudge against Falco for killing several Nanto masters. In the original manga, Buzz is killed after detonating a decommissioned nuclear mortar in a failed attempt to take Falco's life, while a distraught Gill lives on and is convinced to join the Hokuto Army. He is finally seen holding Ein's lifeless body during the destruction of the capital before being phased out from the series. In the anime, both Buzz and Gill die during the explosion. The scene in which Gill holds Ein's corpse has been maintained replacing the Harn with a generic fighter. Buzz is also known as Hazu (ハズ) due to a misprint in the manga (which was fixed in the Kanzenban edition), which is the name used in the TV series.

=== Lui ===
Lui (ルイ, Rui; sometimes romanized as Rui, voiced by Yoshino Takamori) is the twin sister of Rin and the Celestial Empress (天帝, Tentei). Only one of the children was permitted to live, but Falco could not bring himself to kill Rin and instead left her in the care of his aunt and uncle. Lui is kidnapped by Jaco and locked underground in the Imperial Palace as a means by Jacó to blackmail Falco, her protector. Bat, Rin and Ein sets off to the Imperial Castle to free Lui, while Kenshiro is fighting Falco. When Rin meets Lui for the first time, she learns the truth about her heritage. After Lui is freed, Falco turns against Jaco and kills him.

=== Akashachi ===
Akashachi (赤鯱; lit. 'Red Orca')
Voiced by: Daisuke Gōri, Nobuaki Kakuda (2007 movie)
Father of Shachi and also a one legged and one eyed pirate with a metal claw, who transported Kenshiro reluctantly to Shura. He gave a mission to Kenshiro to find his son Shachi that somehow got lost in Shura. Albeit he is portrayed as a brutal pirate in the beginning, he did reveal his good side at the end especially when he tried to save a fatally injured Kenshiro. Raoh personally thanked Akashachi at some point, as he helped Raoh as an ocean transport. In Raoh Den, he cried for Raoh when Koku-oh brought his ashes to Reina. He was killed by Kaioh's hidden crossbow when rescuing Kenshiro; however, he did manage to find his son Shachi, as well as meeting his love, Leia, whom he blessed before passing away. After his death, his son, wore his eye patch in his memory.

=== Leia ===
Leia (レイア, Reia)
Voiced by: Masako Katsuki
A native girl of Shura who breaks Shuran law by preaching against violence. She becomes Shachi's girlfriend which makes him choose to stay in Shura, but later comes to an agreement with Shachi to distance herself from him for her protection. However before Shachi's final battle with Kaioh she travels with him, and eventually holds Shachi and sheds tears for him as he dies.

=== Ryu ===
Ryu (リュウ, Ryū)
Introduced late in the manga's run, Ryu is the orphaned son of Raoh with an unknown mother, who was raised by the Hakuri family after his father's death. Ryu already possess wit and courage at a young age, as he stands up against a group of bandits threatening his village. He is already acquainted with his "Uncle Kenshiro" when he first appears, who introduces him to his father's steed Kokuoh. After Ryu's foster parents, Mr. and Mrs. Hakuri, are killed, Kenshiro takes Ryu as his apprentice and travels with him for a few story arcs before Kenshiro abruptly leaves him under the care of Balga and his son, so that Ryu can train on his own. Ryu never appears in the TV series, as the post-Kaioh chapters of the manga were not adapted, but he makes a unvoiced appearance in a flashback in New Fist of the North Star.

=== Balga ===
Balga (バルガ, Baruga)
Voiced by: Masaki Terasoma (2007 movie)
One of Raoh's former generals. After Raoh died he didn't have a reason to fight and lost his "sting" as one of the hardhitting Generals of Raoh's army. Therefore he became soft and Kōketsu took advantage of that and enslaved Balga. He had to work hard in order to keep his son Shingo (シンゴ) and the other children alive. Later as Kenshiro arrived with Ryu (Raoh's son) they defeated Kōketsu and left Balga in charge of the land, protecting the people and reclaiming his honor. After Baran is defeated, Kenshiro leaves Ryu in Balga's care. In the movie Raoh Den: Gekitō no Shō, it is established that Balga was the unnamed soldier that shot Raoh in the leg with an arrow to stop him from killing Yuria; it's also established that he was Raoh's most trusted soldier and cried for Raoh knowing that he would lose to Kenshiro after being captured by Rihaku.

=== Others ===
Kokuoh (黒王号, Kokuoh-go; "Black King")
An elephant-sized black stallion whom Raoh rides as Kenoh. A wilful and strong creature, Kokuoh has only allowed Raoh, Kenshiro, Juza and Bat to ride him. After Raoh's death, he becomes Kenshiro's steed. He dies of old age during the manga's final arc.
Misumi (ミスミ)
Voiced by: Ryūji Saikachi
A farmer whose life is saved by Ken early in the story. Ken helps him deliver a bag of seed rice to his village, but he is shortly killed by Spade. In the TV series, Misumi is named Smith (スミス, Sumisu).
Toyo (トヨ)
Voiced by: Reiko Suzuki (TV series), Seiko Fujiki (Shin Kyūseishu Densetsu movie series)
Bat's foster mother. Kenshiro helps her dig a well to feed her adopted children. She is later wounded by Jackal, who attacks her village. She reconciles with Bat before dying from her wound. Toyo appears in the movie Raoh Den: Jun'ai no Shō, where she is renamed Martha (マーサ, Māsa).
Taki (タキ)
Voiced by: Kyōko Tongū (TV series), Tōko Aoyama (Shin Kyūseishu Densetsu movie series)
One of Bat's adopted brothers, who leads Kenshiro to Toyo's village. In the manga, Taki is killed by a thug while stealing water from a neighboring village. In the TV series, Taki is saved by Ken at the last moment. He appears in 2006 movie Raoh Den: Jun'ai no Shō, where he is renamed Kaito (カイト).
Koh (コウ, Ko)
Voiced by: Ryō Horikawa
Mamiya's younger brother, who is captured and slain by the Fang Clan.
Shiba (シバ, Shiba)
Voiced by: Keiichi Nanba, Miyu Irino (Shin Kyūseishu Densetsu movie series)
Shu's son. He saves Kenshiro after he is captured and tortured by Thouzer, and accompanies him through the desert to return to Thouzer's city, when a group of Thouzer's men surround him and Kenshiro. Shiba selflessly sacrifices himself by detonating some sticks of dynamite to kill the soldiers, horrifying Kenshiro in the process.
Toh (トウ, Tō)
Voiced by: Mika Doi (TV series), Yuko Kaida (Legend of Yuria)
The daughter of Rihaku. She disguises herself as the Last General of Nanto and then attempts to dissuade Raoh from taking Yuria by offering herself to him instead. After being rejected, she takes her own life in front of him.
Mew (ミュウ, Myū)
Voiced by: Kuniko Ogawa
Falco's wife. When the Empress Lui was kidnapped, she became Jacó's woman to learn the whereabouts of the Empress. She later discovers she is pregnant with Falco's child.
Asuka (アスカ)
Voiced by: Saori Sugimoto
Ein's young daughter, to whom he refers to as his "girl". In the TV series it was further established that she was his adopted daughter, whom he adopted from a young widow that used to take care of him. The widow was killed by bandits and Ein adopted Asuka as his own.
Tao (タオ)
Voiced by: Nozomu Sasaki
Leia's younger brother. He looked up to Shachi as his idol and joined the Shuran training camp against his sister's wishes to follow in Shachi's footsteps. Tao deserted the training camp when he was ordered to kill a friend in combat.
Sayaka (サヤカ)
Voiced by: Gara Takashima
The younger sister of Kaioh and Hyoh's fiancée who hoped that someday Hyoh would bring peace to Shura and they would cross the sea together. In order to manipulate Kenshiro and Hyoh into fighting each other, Kaioh kills Sayaka and then tells Hyoh that Kenshiro was the culprit. This triggers Hyoh's demonic aura, erasing the good moods and pity he still showed with his people.
Black Yaksha (黒夜叉, Kuro Yasha)
Voiced by: Shigeru Chiba
A short dwarfish man who worked as a servant of the main Hokuto bloodline. He wields two long claws in battle. He assists Kenshiro and Hyoh, but dies fighting Kaioh's elite army.
Nagato (ナガト)
Voiced by: Kazumi Tanaka
The second-in-command of Hyoh's army. He serves Hyoh rather than Kaioh due to Hyoh's more forgiving nature. When Hyoh turns insane after Sayaka's death, Nagato and his four subordinates renounces their position due to Hyoh's change of attitude. Hyoh considers this an act of treason and kills him.
Ohka (オウカ, Ōka)
Voiced by: Mika Doi
The sister of Shume and mother to Ryūō. A woman of the Hokuto clan, Ōka and her Shume gave birth to their respective sons on the same day. However, the priests of the Hokuto clan forbade the existence of two possible successors and choose to sacrifice expose both children to a pack of hungry wolves. Realizing that Shume was dying of a terminal illness and would not live to see her child grow, Ōka gave away her life in order to concede the successorship to Shume's son.
Shume (シュメ)
Voiced by: Yuriko Yamamoto
The mother of Shuken. She was already suffering from a terminal illness when she gave birth to Shuken and wished for her son to be the Hokuto successor, going as far as to take Shuken away during the sacrificial ritual the priests set up to determine the successor.
Shuken (シュケン)
The ancestor of Kenshiro and Hyoh. A practitioner of the original Hokuto Sōke style. He was destined to be sacrificed by the Hokuto priests as a part of a successorship ritual, but was spared by the compassion of his mother and his aunt's sacrifice. He is founder of Hokuto Shinken. In the manga Fist of the Blue Sky, it is revealed that he created Hokuto Shinken by blending the Hokuto Sōke style with Seito Gekken.
Ryuoh (リュウオウ, Ryūō)
The ancestor of Raoh, Kaio and Toki. His mother Ōka sacrificed her life so that he and Shuken would grow up together. Ryūō grew up without the love of his mother and lost all respect for love. Since Ryuoh was part of the Hokuto Sōke, he and all of his descendants were born with a Big Dipper-shaped birthmark on their head as proof of their bloodline. The anime establishes Ryuoh as the founder of Hokuto Ryūken, although this is later contradicted in Fist of the Blue Sky, which establishes Hokuto Ryūken as an offshoot of the Hokuto Ryūkaken branch formed centuries after Hokuto Shinken's foundation.
Asam (アサム, Asamu)
The ruler of the Sava Kingdom and Master of Daijō Nanken (大乗南拳; "Southern Fist of Mahayana"). He is the father of three spoiled sons (and one daughter) that don't like each other, as they three fight to be the leader of the land. Attempts to hire Kenshiro to kill his three sons to prevent a civil war.
Kai (カイ)
One of the Viceroys of the Sava Kingdom and the eldest son of Asamu. He was born under the sign of the Red Emperor and bears a resemblance to his father. He competes with his brothers for the successorship, but the three decides to set aside their differences when they learn their father is dying. He is later killed when he is struck from behind by one of the bandits threatening his kingdom.
Bukoh (ブコウ, Bukō)
The second Viceroy of Sava and Asam's middle son. He was born under the sign of the Blue Emperor. After the death of Asam and Kai, he attempts to leave the Kingdom along with Satora, but Satora forces him to stay.
Satora (サトラ)
The third Viceroy of Sava and the youngest of Asam's sons. He was born under the sign of the Yellow Emperor. After the deaths of Kai and Asam, he concedes the throne to Bukō and follows Kenshiro and Ryu to the Kingdom of Blanca to see his fiancee Luseli.
Sara (サラ)
Princess of the Sava Kingdom and the young daughter of Asam. She is the one who seeks Kenshiro's help in order to solve the dispute between her three brothers.
Luseli (ルセリ, Ruseri)
Princess of the Blanca Kingdom and Satora's fiancee. She was saved by Baran, whom bares some resemblance to his younger sister who died many years ago.
Pell (ペル, Peru)
Lin's pet dog. Appears only in the TV series during the early episodes, but disappears after the Thouzer arc.
Saki (サキ)
Voiced by: Kazumi Amemiya (episodes 12-21) → Yumiko Shibata (episode 73)
A young girl who appears in the early episodes of the TV series as Yuria's personal servant in Southern Cross. She provides emotional support to Yuria after learning about her situation and makes an escape attempt with Yuria, hoping to reunite her with Kenshiro. Shin catches the two in the act and decides to punish Saki. However, instead of killing her, she is sent back to her home village. She later appears in the Ryuga arc, where she is shown to be the caretaker of Shin's and Yuria's graves.
Rock (ロック)
Voiced by: Masashi Hironaka (episodes 131-133)
A young man form the Land of Shura who appears only in the Hokuto no Ken 2 anime series. As the leader of a band of cowboy-like fighters, Rock intends to bring peace to the Land of Shura after it is discovered that the man who killed Han was not Raoh but actually Kenshiro, and his father and younger brother are both killed by Shuras following this revelation. When they discover that Kenshiro and Hyoh, the second general of Shura, are biological brothers, he and his gang set out to defeat Hyoh before the two brothers face each other. Hyoh's army slaughters Rock's men and leave Rock fatally wounded. Rock tries to tell Kenshiro that Hyoh is his brother, but succumbs to his wound before he can do so.

== Villains ==
=== Zeed ===
The Zeed (ジード, Jīdo) biker gang are the first group of villains Kenshiro faces in the story. Composed of mohawked punks with the letter "Z" tattooed over their heads, the Zeed gang have raided numerous villages and delivery vehicles for their food and water supply. The gang's leader (voiced by Eiji Kanie and Joe Romersa in the TV series and Hidekatsu Shibata and Michael Forest in the 1986 movie) has "Z 666" tattooed on his forehead. Kenshiro faces the gang when they invade Lin's village and the leader holds Rin captive. Kenshiro easily thwarts Zeed's men before taking on the leader himself, defeating him with the Hokuto Hyakuretsu Ken (North Star Hundred Crack Fist), causing Ken to utter his famous catch-phrase, "You are already dead" (Omae wa mō shindeiru), when he gets up for a counter-attack. Before he dies he says "What?' (nani). That started the memes about the series.

=== King ===
King (キング, Kingu; the Kingsmen in Viz's first English translation) is the gang formed and led by Shin of the Nanto Koshūken school. In the original manga, the King organization is a territorial gang that rules over the former Kantō region, its base of operations being the city of Southern Cross (サザンクロス, Sazankurosu). Its members includes Shin himself, his four lieutenants (who pattern themselves after the four playing card suits) and their numerous nameless underlings. Each of the King gang members are named after playing cards.

The first of Shin's four lieutenants whom Kenshiro encounters is Spade (スペード, Supēdo; voiced by Tesshō Genda), who loses his right eye during their initial encounter due to Kenshiro catching one of his arrows and throwing it back at his eye with the Nishi Shinku Ha technique. The second lieutenant, Diamond (ダイヤ, Daiya; voiced by Daisuke Gōri), is a staff wielding expert with clown-like makeup who executes random villagers to lure Kenshiro. The third, Club (クラブ, Kurabu; voiced by Kōji Totani) is armed with long claws and practices his Praying Mantis style against captured peasants. The fourth and last, Heart (ハート, Hāto; voiced by Shōzō Iizuka in the TV series and by Junpei Takiguchi in the 1986 film version) is a large fat man who can absorb and deflect the impact of most martial art techniques with his stomach, earning him the title the "Destroyer of Fists". Heart is the most merciful and affable of the four lieutenants, which is evident when he orders his underlings to stop harassing a bartender, and tends to respect his opponents. However, his friendliness is underscored by his confidence in his own skills, and his calm nature will quickly dissolve into a blind rage at the mere sight of his own blood, which leads him to enter a berserker-like state in which he will attack everyone near him. Heart is the most prominent of the four lieutenants, appearing in numerous Hokuto no Ken related media outside the original manga. He appears in the 1986 movie as Jagi's bodyguard and in numerous video games as a boss or sub-boss character.

In the TV series, the King organization is much larger in terms of sheer size and influence. In addition to Shin and the four core members from the manga (who are referred in the TV series as the "Four Jacks"), the King organization consists of numerous subordinate organizations and gangs, including God's Army (the Golan Commandos) and the Warriors (Jackal's gang), which were separate organizations in the manga, as well several original villains created for the series. The most prominent original character, Joker (ジョーカー, Jōkā; voiced by Shigeru Chiba in Japanese and Richard Cansino in the English dub) serves as Shin's primary informant and middleman and fights using a form of Nanto Seiken known as Nanto Shōtenken (南斗昇天拳; "South Dipper Ascension Fist") which consists of throwing playing cards with enough speed to cut a man's flesh with ease. General Balcom (バルコム大将軍, Barukomu Daishōgun; voiced by Seizō Katō in Japanese and by Beau Billingslea in the English dub), another original character, is introduced in episode 17 as the commander of King's army and a master of the Taizanji Kenpō (Taishan Temple Martial Arts) style. In episode 21, the episode prior to Kenshiro's battle with Shin, Balcom leads a mutiny against Shin, which results in his own death at Shin's hands in combat and the resulting chaos that ensues later leaves most of Southern Cross burning in flames. Joker also dies in this episode in battle with Kenshiro.

=== Golan ===
The Golan (ゴラン, Goran; the Provident in Viz's first English translation) organization is a militia composed of specially trained commandos that belonged to the fictional Red Beret special forces unit prior to the nuclear war, which was incidentally caused by their country of origin. In the manga, the members of Golan think of themselves as God's chosen and are seeking to create God's Land (ゴッドランド, Goddorando; Providence in Viz's first English translation), a nation for their elite race, by capturing young women and girls for procreation of their race. After Kenshiro rescues Rin from a group of Golan commandos and witnesses the horrors the organization beforehand, Ken decides to infiltrate the group's training camp and confronts their drill instructor, the Mad Sarge (マッド軍曹(サージ), Maddo Sāji; voiced by Yasurō Tanaka in the TV series, voiced by Jamieson Price in the English Dub), a knife fighting expert and user of blood squirting needles. After Ken defeats him, he comes face to face with the group's founder and leader, the Colonel (大佐(カーネル), Kāneru; voiced by Kōji Yada in the TV series, voiced by Dave Mallow in the English Dub), who claims to be a psychic but in reality reads his opponents moves by observing their slight body movements, and an expert of the Nanto Muonken (南斗無音拳; "South Dipper Silent Fist") style, which conceals his presence.

In the anime adaptation, the Golan organization became God's Army (ゴッドアーミー, Goddo Āmī), which is revealed to be one of King's subordinate organizations whose members worship Shin as their deity. in the 1986 movie, the Colonel appears as the security leader of Shin's palace in Southern Cross.

=== Jackal ===
Jackal (ジャッカル, Jakkaru; voiced by Masayuki Katō in the TV series, Hiroshi Ohtake in the 1986 movie and Beau Billingslea in the English dub of the TV series) is the leader of a notorious biker gang that attempts steal water from children. Jackal finds himself at odds with Ken after Jackal's gang invades Bat's home village and kills his adoptive mother, Toyo. Kenshiro follows Jackal's trail, wasting several of his thugs, including Jackal's second-in-command Fox (フォックス, Fokkusu) voiced by Kōji Totani in the TV series and Takeshi Aono in the 1986 movie. Eventually Ken catches up with Jackal at Villainy Prison, a rundown jail which was once used to hold the worst of the worst criminals. As a last-ditch effort, Jackal unleashes a giant beast of man known as the Devil's Rebirth (悪魔の化身(デビルリバース), Debiru Ribāsu; voiced by Eiji Kanie in the TV series), the sole successor of the forbidden Rakan Niōken (Arhat Deva Fist) style and tricks him into fighting Kenshiro by convincing Devil that they're long lost brothers.

In the TV series, Jackal's gang is known as The Warriors and is one of several subordinate organizations of the King empire. Jackal himself is characterized as a master of Nanto Bakusatsuken (南斗爆殺拳; "South Dipper Explosive Kill Fist"), a Nanto style involving the use of dynamite. Jackal gets help from Joker to unleash Devil. In the 1986 movie, Jackal and Fox appears as members of Jagi's gang.

=== Fang Clan ===
The Fang Clan (牙一族, Kiba Ichizoku; also known as the Kiba Clan or simply the Fangs) are a gang of mountain bandits who pattern themselves after a wolf pack. The gang are masters of the Kazan Gunrōken (Mount Hua Wolf Pack Fist) style. The clan's leader and father figure, a giant man known as Boss Fang (牙大王, Kiba Daiō; lit. "Great Fang King", voiced by Takeshi Watabe in the Japanese version of the TV series, and James Avery in the English version), is a master of the Kazan Kakuteigi (Huashan Horn Wrestling) style, a style which allows him to harden his skin and turn his flesh into steel. Kenshiro and Rei are hired by Mamiya to protect her village against the Fangs. When Mamiya's brother, Kou, is slaughtered by the Fangs, Ken and Rei put aside their differences to annihilate the clan. Boss Fang manages to get a hold of Rei's missing sister, Airi, and takes Mamiya captive as well, hoping to use them as leverage against the two masters.

In the 1986 movie, the Fang Clan appears as a rival gang who fights against Kenoh's army for their territory. Raoh defeats Boss Fang with ease.

=== Amiba ===
Amiba (アミバ) is a self-proclaimed genius who has developed a self-styled imitation of Hokuto Shinken by observing Toki's treatment of patients in Miracle Village. He bears a grudge against Toki after being scolded for mistreating a patient and when the real Toki vanishes, Amiba decides to tarnish his reputation by impersonating him (by changing his facial appearance and reproducing the scar on his back) and using captive human test subjects for his sadistic pressure point experiments. Kenshiro confronts Amiba, believing that he is the real Toki who has turned evil, until Rei (having trained with Amiba in the Nanto Seiken school) arrives at the last moment and exposes his true identity. Amiba was voiced by Takaya Hashi in the original TV series. He is reincarnated in another world in Amiba Gaiden, a comedy series parodying the isekai genre where the genius is reincarnated in another world with his knowledge of martial arts intact.

=== Cassandra ===
The Dungeon of Cassandra (カサンドラ, Kasandora), also known as the City of Wailing Demons, was originally under the control of the Dragon Emperor as means to ward off intruders until Raoh took over, turning into a prison city where many of his enemies are locked-up, mainly rival martial artists who were forced to give up their martial art secrets to Kenoh. The dungeon is run by Uighur, the Warden (ウイグル獄長, Uiguru Gokuchō; voiced by Daisuke Gōri), a giant in viking armor who Raoh gave the position to after expressing his interest in the legend Uighur wishes to make for himself. Uighur is master of a Taishan fighting style involving the use of whips and his special technique is a powerful shoulder tackle called the "Mongolian Dominator" (蒙古覇極道, Mōko Hakyokudō; lit. 'Tao of the Mongolian Champion'). The gatekeepers of Cassandra, Raiga (ライガ; voiced by Yūji Mikimoto) and Fūga (フウガ; voiced by Ikuya Sawaki), are the twin successors of the Nishin Fūraiken (二神風雷拳; "Dual Gods Wind Thunder Fist") style. The twins are honorable warriors whose younger brother, Mitsu, is being kept hostage by Uighur and his men. Kenshiro, Rei and Mamiya head to Cassandra to rescue Toki, who is being kept prisoner there. Eventually, Uighur is killed by Kenshiro who frees Toki and the other prisoners in Cassandra.

Uighur appears in the 1986 movie as a public executioner and the second-in-command in Raoh's army, who is killed by Rei.

=== Kenoh's army ===
Beginning with the Cassandra arc, Kenshiro and his allies faces against Kenoh's numerous minions thorough their campaign against the conqueror. These include Kenoh's Royal Guards at Cassandra, led by the Arabian swordsmen Zarqa and Qasim; the Kenoh Transformation Attack Squad, led by a man posing as an old woman named Dekai Baba; the Kenoh Invasion Squad, led by the fire-breather Gallon; the Dog Master Galf, who controls Medicine City; Gonzu, A cruel record holder in Human Hammer Throw; the arabic-looking swordmaster Jemoni; Hiruka, a Taizan Yōken master who challenges Fudo; and Jadow, a biker (among others).

=== UD gang ===
Kenshiro and Rei face Yuda's minions before Rei's battle with Yuda. They are recognizable by the "UD" tattoos on their bodies. Two of Yuda's most notable minions include the Nanto Hiyoku Ken master Dagarl (ダガール, Dagāru; voiced by Yūsaku Yara) and Komaku (コマク; voiced by Shigeru Chiba), a diminutive henchman who is usually around Juda.

=== The Holy Emperor's army ===
Souther's army are recognizable by the Roman-like imperial armor they wear. The knife-throwers Beji and Giji of the Nanto Sōzanken style are part of his army, as well as Rizo, a friend of Shu.

=== Jaco ===
Jaco (ジャコウ, Jakō; voiced by Shigeru Chiba) is the Viceroy of the Imperial Capital. He gained his position by locking away the Celestial Empress Lui and blackmailing Falco into destroying the Hokuto and Nanto fighters. Ostensibly, this is because they attempt to outshine the Gento's imperial star, Taikyokusei (大極星; aka Polaris, not to be confused with Hokuto which is the Big Dipper). In reality however, as Raoh was set to leave the Gento village after Falco convinced him to spare them, The Kenoh told his would be adversary that his surrogate brother Jaco had evil intentions and that Falco should kill him if he wanted to maintain their peace. Falco could not bring himself to do so at the time, as Falco's birth mother also raised Jaco as her own and killing him would have devastated her. Jaco's encounter with Raoh however, left a deep terror in him. As a result, he has developed severe achluophobia.

Jaco is assisted by his two sons Jask (ジャスク, Jasuku) and Shiino (シーノ, Shīno), who are replaced in the TV series by the renegade Gento masters Green Light Taiga (タイガ; voiced by Masaharu Sato) and Blue Light Boltz (ボルツ, Borutsu; voiced by Yōsuke Akimoto). Shiino is killed by Kenshiro, while Jaco himself is killed by Falco after Lui is rescued. Jask is buried under debris, but survives. He is rescued by an unaware Rin and he immediately kidnaps her as part of his plan for revenge. After blowing up the capital city Jask takes off to the Land of Shura, only to be slaughtered by the warriors of Shura.

=== Shura Warriors ===
During the Land of Shura arc, Ken and his allies face off against various marauders in the brutal country, who are masters of unique martial art styles and are of the notoriously violent Shura warrior caste. Some of the notable Shuras featured in the story include: the Nameless Shura (無名修羅, Mumei Shura; voiced by Jūji Matsuda), a ninjutsu master who gives Falco his final battle; Kaiser (カイゼル, Kaizeru; voiced by Yūsaku Yara), who uses a style which allows him to phase in and remove the bones and organs of his opponents without drawing blood; and Alf (アルフ, Arufu), who can slow down time; among others. Buron (ブロン, Buron), a boomerang-wielding Shura who goes on a killing spree after Han's death; Xiè (シエ, Shie), a crab-like Shura who fights with large claws and hidden traps; Gyoko (ギョウコ, Gyōko), an obese Shura who travels with his men in a trackless steam train and murders anyone who suggests that he is overweight.

=== Kohketsu ===
Kohketsu (コウケツ, Kōketsu) is a short and fat dictator who possessed some intelligence, used to work as a horsefeeder in Raoh army, he once tried to influence Raoh by deliberately brushing his shoes for him, however Raoh saw through his tomfoolery and threatened to kill Koketsu, he was humiliated in front of Raoh's army. When peace returned to the land with Raoh's death, Koketsu used his intelligence and ruthlessness to steal lands from farmers and enslaving gullible wasteland dwellers. One of those land that he stole was from Ryu's adoptive parents. He is killed by his own mouse trap in the food storage room.

=== Baran ===
Proclaiming himself to be "Baran, the Emperor of Light" (光帝バラン, Kōtei Baran), he is a dictator who conquered the land of Blanca by imprisoning its King and proclaiming himself to be God, building a cult of brainwashed minions. He uses the Hokuto Shinken that he learnt from observing Raoh as a boy, and even uses Raoh's Hokuto Gousho Ha technique. After he is defeated by Kenshiro, he releases the King of Blanca and has himself executed for his sins.

=== Bolge ===
A blind wasteland thug that Kenshiro confronts in the final story arc of the manga, Bolge (ボルゲ, Boruge) was blinded during a past encounter with Ken (shortly after Ken met Bat), and thus bears a deep hatred towards him. To protect an amnesiac Ken and Lin, Bat engraves seven scars on his chest and pretends to be Ken and offers himself to Bolge. However, his plan backfires and must endure the torture of Bolge's revenge. Bat is saved only when Kenshiro's memory returns and he defeats Bolge, but when Bolge survives Kenshiro's final attack and makes one final attempt to kill him, it is Bat who ultimately finishes him off.
