= Raoh =

Fictional character from Fist of the North Star

- Fist of the North Star character
- Raoh, as depicted on the cover of Hokuto no Ken: Kyūkyokuban Vol. 10
- First appearance: Fist of the North Star chapter 42: "A Merciless Law" (July 23, 1984)
- Created by: Tetsuo Hara, Buronson

In-universe information
- Alias: Ken-oh ("King of Fist")
- Title(s): The Eldest of the Four Hokuto Brothers; The Conqueror of the Century's End
- Relatives: Unnamed mother Kaioh (biological older brother); Toki (biological younger brother); Sayaka (biological younger sister); Ryuken (adoptive father and sifu); Jagi (adoptive younger brother); Kenshiro (adoptive younger brother); Ryu (son)

Raoh (ラオウ, Raō) is a fictional character in the manga series Fist of the North Star created by Buronson and Tetsuo Hara. He is the eldest of four honorary brothers (including the protagonist Kenshiro) who trained in the ancient assassination art of Hokuto Shinken. Following his introduction in Chapter 42 of the original manga, Raoh serves as Kenshiro's primary rival and adversary during a great portion of the series, being in the case, the main antagonist of Fist of the North Star, having already taken the mantle of Ken-oh (拳王, Ken'ō; Fist King), a tyrannical warlord that seeks to dominate the post-apocalyptic world. In contrast to Kenshiro's title as the "Savior of Century's End", Raoh is commonly referred as the Supreme Ruler of the Century's End (世紀末覇者, Seikimatsu Hasha) within the story.

Following the conclusion of his story arc, Raoh plays a significant role in the remaining chapters of the manga. He would also go on to play a major role in subsequent books and anime adaptations that were published after the original manga and its original anime. He serves as a central character in The Legends of the True Savior movie series and was the protagonist in his own spinoff manga and anime series Legends of the Dark King.

== Character overview ==
Raoh is the eldest of the four adopted children trained by Ryuken, the previous Hokuto Shinken master. The manga gives two different origins through the course of the story. In his first origin, Raoh and his biological younger brother Toki, were adopted by Ryuken after their real parents died. The second (and real) origin shows that a young Raoh and Toki, along with an infant Kenshiro, were actually refugees from the Kingdom of Shura who were sent to Japan to be trained in the art of Hokuto Shinken by Ryuken after their homeland was torn apart by a civil war. Raoh trained under Ryuken along with Toki and Kenshiro, as well as another student named Jagi. In spite of his ambitions to become the greatest martial artist in the world, Raoh lost the rights to the Hokuto Shinken succession to Kenshiro. Refusing to give up the style, Raoh killed his sifu Ryuken in combat and leaves to become the savior of the world.

=== Legends of the Dark King ===
With the aid of his childhood friends Reina and Souga, Raoh gradually builds his army. Later he conquers the Dungeon City of Cassandra and takes over Goram the Demon King's castle as his own while taking the name of Ken-oh (King of Fist). Among his many subordinates are his adoptive brother Jagi, the Toki impersonator Amiba, Uighur the Warden of Cassandra Dungeon, Juda of the Nanto Seiken school, and Ryuga, the elder brother of Kenshiro's fiancée Julia, among others. Raoh also took a giant black stallion named Kokuoh-Go (黒王号, Kokuōgō; Black King) as his personal steed. After his attempt to recruit Ryuroh into his army, Raoh became more cruel in his campaign. Eventually, Raoh confronts Souther and the two battle until it ends in a stalemate and a temporary ceasefire between their armies.

=== Fist of the North Star and "Legends of the True Savior" ===
Raoh first appears in the story after Kenshiro and his allies have destroyed Cassandra. Raoh and his army begin to occupy Mamiya's home village afterward. Rei is the first warrior to challenge him, but he proves to be no match against Raoh and is defeated. He is then challenged by both, Ken and Toki, and managed to thwart both. In the end, Raoh fights Ken again and the battle between the two men end in a stalemate, with both too wounded to continue fighting. As revealed in The Legends of the True Savior segment, Legend of Raoh - Chapter of Love in Death, after being forced to kill Souga in a ruse to boost his army's morale and dissuade them from revolting, Raoh's army battles Souther's army until Reina is injured while saving an infant caught in the crossfire. Raoh then saves Reina's life by striking a pressure point and entrusts her to Toki, leaving with her the pendant she gave to Raoh when he left the Land of Asura as a child.

After Souther's defeat, Raoh re-emerges to resume his "conquest of the heavens". He gauges the extent of his recovery by challenging Koryu, Ryuken's former rival for the Hokuto Shinken succession and defeats him. Raoh then challenges his brother Toki to a fight and defeats him, but spares his life out of sympathy because Toki was already dying from a terminal disease. Raoh later fights the warriors of the Five Chariots, who challenge Raoh on behalf of the Last General of Nanto Seiken. When Raoh discovers that the Last General is actually Yuria, he rushes to the capital of Nanto to capture her only to be confronted by Kenshiro, who has now mastered the ultimate Hokuto Shinken technique of Musō Tensei, the Unconscious Transmigration of Souls. Raoh manages to escape from Ken and takes Yuria captive with him.

Vowing to overcome the fear he felt fighting Kenshiro, Raoh decides to challenge Fudoh of the Mountains, the first person who ever made him feel fear. During his confrontation with Fudoh, Raoh learns that the only way he can ever learn Musō Tensei is to experience true sorrow. Raoh decides to take Yuria's life to achieve, only to learn that she is already dying from a terminal illness as well. Feeling sympathy for her fate, Raoh is able to master Musō Tensei as well. In Legend of Raoh - Chapter of Fierce Fighting, prior to his final battle with Ken, Raoh kills some of the more power-hungry members of his army to ensure that his army would not be corrupted if he dies fighting Ken. Once at the Hokuto Renkitōza, the North Star Mind and Body Training Ground, Kenshiro and Raoh engage in a long grueling battle in which Kenshiro emerges as the ultimate victor. Raoh praises the strength Ken gained from fighting against other rivals before revealing that instead of killing her, he had extended Yuria's lifespan by a few years via the use of his Pressure Points. Raoh then jettisons his remaining life energy up into the heavens to restore light to the world proudly declaring, "I have no regrets for the life that I've lived!" After the final battle, his ashes are brought by Kokuoh-go to Reina, which she takes back to Raoh's homeland, the Land of Asura.

Raoh's presence figures prominently in the story arcs following his death, as his influences is felt on other characters introduced afterward such as Falco and Akashachi. In the Land of Asura, Raoh was worshiped as a hero by the villagers, who saw him as their only hope against the corrupt ruler Kaioh, who is in fact Raoh and Toki's biological elder brother. The final chapters of the manga reveals that Raoh has left behind a son named Ryu.

== Voice actors ==
Raoh's voice actors in the original Japanese versions of several Hokuto no Ken productions includes Kenji Utsumi in the original television series and 1986 film (as well as in a few video games), Tesshō Genda in the animated short film Legend of Heroes, the video games J-Stars Victory Vs and Fitness Boxing: Fist of the North Star, Takashi Ukaji in the Shin Kyūseishu Densetsu film series and Ten no Haō anime series, Rikiya Koyama in the PSP game version of Ten no Haō, Fumihiko Tachiki in the video game Hokuto Musō, and Masami Iwasaki, the voice of Ryuji Goda, in the video game Fist of the North Star: Lost Paradise. Other voice actors have voiced the child version of Raoh such as Keiichi Nanba in the original television series, Nobuo Tobita in its sequel, Shigeru Shibuya in the Shin Kyūseishu Densetsu movies, and Takayuki Kondō in the Ten no Haō series. In Episode 32 of the original television, Raoh's initial silhouetted appearance was voiced by Norio Wakamoto. In English language versions, Raoh was voiced by Wally Burr in the Streamline Pictures' dub of the 1986 film, by Andrew Love in Sentai Filmworks' release of Legends of the Dark King, and by Patrick Seitz in Lost Paradise. For a brief flashback in Manga Entertainment's dub of the TV series, Raoh was voiced by John Snyder.

== In culture ==
To promote the theatrical release of Raoh Den Gekitō no Shō (an animated retelling of Kenshiro's final battle with Raoh), the producers of the film conducted a mock funeral service that was held at the Koyasan Tokyo Betsuin on April 18, 2007. A recording of the funeral service was included as a bonus feature in the Japanese DVD release of the film.
