= List of Fist of the North Star video games =

The four Hokuto no Ken video games for the Family Computer

The following is a list of video games based on the manga and anime series Fist of the North Star (Hokuto no Ken). Since 1986, many video games based on the franchise have been released for the Japanese market, including coin-operated arcade games and computer software. Some of them have been also released for the North American and European markets, including Black Belt (rebranded from 1986's Hokuto no Ken), Fist of the North Star (1987), Last Battle (rebranded from Shin Seikimatsu Kyūseishu Densetsu: Hokuto no Ken), Fighting Mania, Fist of the North Star (2005), Fist of the North Star: Ken's Rage, Fist of the North Star: Ken's Rage 2, and Fist of the North Star: Lost Paradise.

== 1980s ==
| Game | Details |
|---|---|
| Hokuto no Ken: Violence Gekiga Adventure 北斗の拳 バイオレンス劇画アドベンチャー Original release date(s): JPN: May 1986 | Release years by system: NEC PC-8801, PC-9801, FM-7 |
| Hokuto no Ken: Violence Gekiga Adventure 北斗の拳 バイオレンス劇画アドベンチャー Original release date(s): JPN: May 1986 | Notes: A graphic adventure game released by Enix, it is the first Hokuto no Ken video game ever produced. The story is a loose adaptation of the Shin story arc. |
| Hokuto no Ken 北斗の拳 Original release date(s): JPN: July 20, 1986 | Release years by system: 1986 - Sega Mark III; 2004 - PlayStation 2 (Sega Ages 2500 vol.11); 2008 - Wii (Virtual Console) |
| Hokuto no Ken 北斗の拳 Original release date(s): JPN: July 20, 1986 | Notes: The first Hokuto no Ken game by Sega. A side-scrolling action game with five stages (the Town of Southern Cross, God's Land, Devil's Rebirth, the Legacy of Cassandra, and the Cross Mausoleum of the Holy Emperor), culminating in a final one-on-one battle with Raoh.; The international version is titled Black Belt and features altered graphics and characters due to the removal of the Hokuto license. |
| Hokuto no Ken 北斗の拳 Original release date(s): JPN: August 10, 1986 | Release years by system: Family Computer |
| Hokuto no Ken 北斗の拳 Original release date(s): JPN: August 10, 1986 | Notes: The first Hokuto no Ken video game released by Toei for the Famicom. A side-scrolling action platform game where the players fight their way through five stages. Bosses include Mr. Heart, Shin, Jagi, Souther, and Raoh. |
| Fist of the North Star 北斗の拳2 世紀末救世主伝説 Original release date(s): JPN: April 17, 1987; NA: April, 1989 | Release years by system: Nintendo Entertainment System |
| Fist of the North Star 北斗の拳2 世紀末救世主伝説 Original release date(s): JPN: April 17, 1987; NA: April, 1989 | Notes: The second Hokuto no Ken video game released by Toei for the Famicom. Released in Japan as Hokuto no Ken 2: Seikimatsu Kyūseishu Densetsu (北斗の拳2 世紀末救世主伝説). Based on the early episodes of the Hokuto no Ken 2 anime series, the game features Kenshiro as he faces against the warriors of the Gento empire. There are eight stages in the game. Bosses include Bask, Geila, Taiga, Solia, Boltz, Bronza, Falco, and the Nameless Shura.; Released in North America in 1989 under the title of Fist of the North Star. The game was advertised in issues of Viz Communication's initial English adaptation of the Fist of the North Star manga. |
| Hokuto no Ken: Shin Seikimatsu Kyūseishu Densetsu 北斗の拳 新世紀末救世主伝説 Original release date(s): JPN: July 1, 1989 | Release years by system: 1989 - Mega Drive; 2008 - Wii (Virtual Console) |
| Hokuto no Ken: Shin Seikimatsu Kyūseishu Densetsu 北斗の拳 新世紀末救世主伝説 Original release date(s): JPN: July 1, 1989 | Notes: The second Hokuto no Ken game released by Sega. It is a side-scrolling action game similar to the Mark III original composed of four stages based on the Imperial Capital and Asura arcs of the manga (the portions which were adapted for the Hokuto no Ken 2 anime series).; The international version, titled Last Battle, features recolored graphics and renamed characters, although the actual character designs and plot were unchanged. |
| Hokuto no Ken 3: Shin Seiki Sōzō: Seiken Retsuden 北斗の拳3 新世紀創造 凄拳列伝 Original release date(s): JPN: October 19, 1989 | Release years by system: Family Computer |
| Hokuto no Ken 3: Shin Seiki Sōzō: Seiken Retsuden 北斗の拳3 新世紀創造 凄拳列伝 Original release date(s): JPN: October 19, 1989 | Notes: The third Hokuto no Ken video game released by Toei for the Famicom. A role-playing video game which adapts the storyline from the beginning of the manga to the Asura arc. The player takes control of a party composed primarily of Kenshiro, Bat, and Lin, as they encounter several characters from the series along the way. |
| Fist of the North Star: 10 Big Brawls for the King of the Universe 北斗の拳 凄絶十番勝負 Original release date(s): JPN: December 22, 1989; NA: April 1990 | Release years by system: Game Boy |
| Fist of the North Star: 10 Big Brawls for the King of the Universe 北斗の拳 凄絶十番勝負 Original release date(s): JPN: December 22, 1989; NA: April 1990 | Notes: A fighting game released by Toei for the Game Boy. Known in Japan as Hokuto no Ken: Seizetsu Jūban Shōbu (北斗の拳 凄絶十番勝負). The player takes control of Kenshiro or one of ten of his adversaries from the series (Heart, Shin, Jagi, Uighur, Souther, Raoh, Falco, Han, Hyou, and Kaioh).; Released in North America in 1990 by Electro Brain under the title of Fist of the North Star: 10 Big Brawls for the King of Universe. |

== 1990s ==
| Game | Details |
|---|---|
| Hokuto no Ken 4: Shichisei Hakenden: Hokuto Shinken no Kanata he 北斗の拳4 七星覇拳伝 北斗神拳の彼方へ Original release date(s): JPN: March 29, 1991 | Release years by system: Family Computer |
| Hokuto no Ken 4: Shichisei Hakenden: Hokuto Shinken no Kanata he 北斗の拳4 七星覇拳伝 北斗神拳の彼方へ Original release date(s): JPN: March 29, 1991 | Notes: The fourth and final Hokuto no Ken video game released by Toei for the Famicom. An RPG similar to the previous game, it features an entirely new storyline set years after the conclusion of the manga. The protagonist is a descendant of the Hokuto Sōke bloodline who embarks on a journey to become the next Hokuto Shinken successor. |
| Hokuto no Ken 5 : Tenma Ryūsei Den: Ai Zesshō 北斗の拳5 天魔流星伝 哀★絶章 Original release date(s): JPN: July 10, 1992 | Release years by system: Super Famicom |
| Hokuto no Ken 5 : Tenma Ryūsei Den: Ai Zesshō 北斗の拳5 天魔流星伝 哀★絶章 Original release date(s): JPN: July 10, 1992 | Notes: The first Hokuto no Ken for the Super Famicom. An RPG similar to the third and fourth games for the Famicom, the game features another original storyline. This time the story is set in an alternate universe where a new protagonist must embark on a journey to unite the Hokuto, Nanto, and Gento successors against a common enemy. |
| Hokuto no Ken 6 : Gekitō Denshōken: Haō e no Michi 北斗の拳6 激闘伝承拳 覇王への道 Original release date(s): JPN: November 20, 1992 | Release years by system: Super Famicom |
| Hokuto no Ken 6 : Gekitō Denshōken: Haō e no Michi 北斗の拳6 激闘伝承拳 覇王への道 Original release date(s): JPN: November 20, 1992 | Notes: The second Hokuto no Ken game for the Super Famicom by Toei. It is a one-on-one fighting game featuring eight playable characters: Kenshiro, Mr. Heart, Rei, Souther, Raoh, Falco, Kuroyasha, and Kaioh. |
| Hokuto no Ken 7 : Seiken Retsuden: Denshōsha e no Michi 北斗の拳７ 聖拳列伝 伝承者への道 Original release date(s): JPN: December 24, 1993 | Release years by system: Super Famicom |
| Hokuto no Ken 7 : Seiken Retsuden: Denshōsha e no Michi 北斗の拳７ 聖拳列伝 伝承者への道 Original release date(s): JPN: December 24, 1993 | Notes: The third and final Hokuto no Ken game for the Super Famicom by Toei. Another one-on-one fighting, it features a similar character roster, with Falco, Kuroyasha, and Kaioh replaced by Shin, Shu, and Juza. Mr. Heart, along with the King of Kiba, appear in this game as CPU-only opponent in the Story and Battle modes. |
| Hokuto no Ken 北斗の拳 Original release date(s): JPN: December 22, 1995 | Release years by system: 1995- Sega Saturn; 1996 - PlayStation |
| Hokuto no Ken 北斗の拳 Original release date(s): JPN: December 22, 1995 | Notes: A graphic adventure game released by Banpresto for the Saturn and PlayStation. Set years after the ending of the original manga, the story centers around Kenshiro's quest to rescue Lin and Lui from the masters of Hokuto Mumyōken, a style which branched off from Hokuto Shinken. |

== 2000s ==
| Game | Details |
|---|---|
| Fighting Mania: Fist of the North Star パンチマニア ～北斗の拳～ Original release date(s): JPN: March 2000 | Release years by system: Arcade |
| Fighting Mania: Fist of the North Star パンチマニア ～北斗の拳～ Original release date(s): JPN: March 2000 | Notes: A first-person boxing game released by Konami for the arcades on a dedicated cabinet. It was released in Japan as Punch Mania: Hokuto no Ken (パンチマニア ～北斗の拳～) and internationally as Fighting Mania. Based on the first anime series, the player fights against characters from the series in one-on-one matches. There six courses in the game, each covering a certain portion of the storyline. |
| Hokuto no Ken: Seikimatsu Kyūseishu Densetsu 北斗の拳 世紀末救世主伝説 Original release date(s): JPN: October 26, 2000 | Release years by system: PlayStation |
| Hokuto no Ken: Seikimatsu Kyūseishu Densetsu 北斗の拳 世紀末救世主伝説 Original release date(s): JPN: October 26, 2000 | Notes: A 3D action game released by Bandai which adapts the storyline of the manga from the beginning to Kenshiro's final battle with Raoh. The game features most of the same voice actors from the TV series reprising their roles. |
| Punch Mania: Hokuto no Ken 2: Gekitō Shura no Kuni Hen パンチマニア ～北斗の拳2 激闘 修羅の国編～ Original release date(s): JPN: December 2000 | Release years by system: Arcade |
| Punch Mania: Hokuto no Ken 2: Gekitō Shura no Kuni Hen パンチマニア ～北斗の拳2 激闘 修羅の国編～ Original release date(s): JPN: December 2000 | Notes: An upgraded version of the original Punch Mania, it features all the courses from game, as well as five new courses based on the second anime series. It was released on a dedicated dual cabinet with support for two different two player modes (competitive and cooperative). |
| Sega Ages 2500: Hokuto no Ken SEGA AGES 2500 北斗の拳 Original release date(s): JPN: March 25, 2004 | Release years by system: PlayStation 2 |
| Sega Ages 2500: Hokuto no Ken SEGA AGES 2500 北斗の拳 Original release date(s): JPN: March 25, 2004 | Notes: Remake of Sega's 1986 Hokuto no Ken game for the Mark III featuring fully polygonal graphics. Includes the original Mark III version as a bonus. |
| Fist of the North Star Original release date(s): JPN: December 2005 | Release years by system: 2005 - Arcade (Atomiswave); 2007 - PlayStation 2 |
| Fist of the North Star Original release date(s): JPN: December 2005 | Notes: A one-on-one competitive fighting game released by Sega and developed by Arc System Works. It features ten characters from the series, which includes Kenshiro, Mr. Heart, Shin, Rei, Mamiya, Jagi, Juda, Thouther, Toki, and Raoh.; Released for the arcades as Hokuto no Ken (北斗の拳) in Japan and Fist of the North Star internationally.; Released for the PlayStation 2 in 2007 as Hokuto no Ken: Shinpan no Sōsōsei: Kengō Retsuden (北斗の拳 審判の双蒼星 拳豪列伝). |
| Hokuto no Ken: Hokuto Shinken Denshōsha no Michi 北斗の拳 〜北斗神拳伝承者の道〜 Original release date(s): JPN: February 14, 2008 | Release years by system: Nintendo DS |
| Hokuto no Ken: Hokuto Shinken Denshōsha no Michi 北斗の拳 〜北斗神拳伝承者の道〜 Original release date(s): JPN: February 14, 2008 | Notes: Released by Spike, it is a digital comic version of the manga featuring action sequences in which the player must defeat Kenshiro's adversaries by touching their vital points on the touch screen. |
| Hokuto no Ken Online 北斗の拳オンライン Original release date(s): JPN: July 2008 | Release years by system: Windows |
| Hokuto no Ken Online 北斗の拳オンライン Original release date(s): JPN: July 2008 | Notes: MMORPG produced by Korean-based Gung-ho Online Entertainment. |
| Hokuto no Ken: Raō Gaiden: Ten no Haō 北斗の拳 ラオウ外伝 天の覇王 Original release date(s): JPN: January 22, 2009 | Release years by system: PlayStation Portable |
| Hokuto no Ken: Raō Gaiden: Ten no Haō 北斗の拳 ラオウ外伝 天の覇王 Original release date(s): JPN: January 22, 2009 | Notes: 3D fighting game released by Interchannel based on the Raoh spin-off manga Ten no Haoh. Features 13 playable characters, which includes Raoh, Reina, Souga, Thouzer, Juda, Ryuroh, Ryuga, Sakuya, Uighur, Toki, Amiba, Jagi, and Kenshiro. |

== 2010s ==
| Game | Details |
|---|---|
| Fist of the North Star: Ken's Rage 北斗無双 Original release date(s): JPN: March 25, 2010; NA: November 2, 2010; EU: November 5, 2010 | Release years by system: PlayStation 3, Xbox 360 |
| Fist of the North Star: Ken's Rage 北斗無双 Original release date(s): JPN: March 25, 2010; NA: November 2, 2010; EU: November 5, 2010 | Notes: A 3D action game by Koei Tecmo using the mechanics of their Dynasty Warriors series. It is the first Fist of the North Star game to be released in the US since 1989. |
| Fist of the North Star: Ken's Rage 2 真・北斗無双 Original release date(s): JPN: December 20, 2012; NA: February 5, 2013; EU: February 8, 2013; JPN Wii U: January 31, 2013; NA Wii U: February 7, 2013; EU Wii U: February 7, 2013 | Release years by system: PlayStation 3, Xbox 360, Wii U |
| Fist of the North Star: Lost Paradise 北斗が如く (Hokuto ga Gotoku) Original release date(s): JPN: March 8, 2018; NA: October 2, 2018; EU: October 2, 2018 | Release years by system: PlayStation 4 |
| Fist of the North Star: Lost Paradise 北斗が如く (Hokuto ga Gotoku) Original release date(s): JPN: March 8, 2018; NA: October 2, 2018; EU: October 2, 2018 | Notes: A 3D action RPG by Sega that features similar combat, exploration, and mini-games to their Yakuza series.; Includes the Master System game Hokuto no Ken as an in-game unlockable. |
| Fist of the North Star: Legends ReVIVE Hokuto no Ken: Legends ReVIVE Original release date(s): WW: September 5, 2019 | Release years by system: Mobile, Android, iPad, iOS |

== Gekiuchi series ==
| Game | Details |
|---|---|
| Typing Ōgi: Hokuto no Ken Gekiuchi タイピング奥義 北斗の拳 激打 Original release date(s): JPN: March 1999 | Release years by system: Windows, Mac OS |
| Typing Ōgi: Hokuto no Ken Gekiuchi タイピング奥義 北斗の拳 激打 Original release date(s): JPN: March 1999 | Notes: A typing game released by SSI Tristar for computers, the game has seven stages, each based on a portion of the manga (covering up to Ken's first battle with Raoh).; A re-release titled Second Edition was released in 2000. |
| Typing Haō: Hokuto no Ken Gekiuchi 2 タイピング覇王 北斗の拳 激打 2 Original release date(s): JPN: July 2000 | Release years by system: Windows, Mac OS |
| Typing Haō: Hokuto no Ken Gekiuchi 2 タイピング覇王 北斗の拳 激打 2 Original release date(s): JPN: July 2000 | Notes: The second Hokuto no Ken typing game by SSI Tristar. The sequel to the original Gekiuchi, it features two game modes, one starring Kenshiro and the other Raoh. |
| Typing Shugyō: Hokuto no Ken Gekiuchi Zero タイピング修行 北斗の拳 激打 Zero Original release date(s): JPN: February 2001 | Release years by system: Windows, Mac OS |
| Typing Shugyō: Hokuto no Ken Gekiuchi Zero タイピング修行 北斗の拳 激打 Zero Original release date(s): JPN: February 2001 | Notes: The third Hokuto no Ken typing game by SSI Tristar, it is set during Kenshiro's Hokuto Shinken training, culminating with his first battle with Shin. |
| Typing Hyakuretsuken: Hokuto no Ken Gekiuchi 3 タイピング百裂拳 北斗の拳 激打 3 Original release date(s): JPN: April 2003 | Release years by system: Windows, Mac OS |
| Typing Hyakuretsuken: Hokuto no Ken Gekiuchi 3 タイピング百裂拳 北斗の拳 激打 3 Original release date(s): JPN: April 2003 | Notes: The fourth Hokuto no Ken typing game by SSI Tristar. It features a different format from the previous Gekiuchi games, in which the player chooses from one of eleven characters and competes against the other ten. Whereas the previous Gekiuchi games feature anime-style artwork by artist Junichi Hayama, the graphics in this game are drawn more closely to Tetsuo Hara's original manga art. |
| Hokuto no Ken: Gekiuchi Online 北斗の拳 激打ONLINE Original release date(s): JPN: March 1, 2004 | Release years by system: Windows, Mac OS |
| Hokuto no Ken: Gekiuchi Online 北斗の拳 激打ONLINE Original release date(s): JPN: March 1, 2004 | Notes: Online typing multiplayer game that was playable by paying a monthly subscription. The graphic assets were reused from Gekiuchi 3. The player could play against human opponent or CPU. Game had a power up system where the player could earn experience points by playing online and use them to upgrade character's stats (attack, defense, endurance, evasion, critical hit chance) when playing against CPU. The game had a ranking and title system which was used for fair player matchmaking. Trial version was available and it only had 6 characters (Souther, Shin, Jagi, Rei, Shu, Heart). The servers were closed down on April 30, 2005, making the game unplayable |

== Hisshōhō series ==
| Game | Details |
|---|---|
| Jissen PachiSlot Hisshōhō! Hokuto no Ken 実戦 パチスロ必勝法! 北斗の拳: JPN: May 27, 2004; – PlayStation 2 | Notes: A simulated version of Sammy's Hokuto no Ken pachislot machine.; A limited edition "DX Pack" was released in addition to the standard edition which included a specialized pachislot controller for the PS2 and a wristband. |
| Jissen PachiSlot Hisshōhō! Hokuto no Ken Plus 実戦パチスロ必勝法！ 北斗の拳 Plus: JPN: February 24, 2005; – PlayStation 2 | Notes: An updated version of the previous Hokuto no Ken pachislot simulator. It introduces two new panel designs: Kokuoh and Shukumei. |
| Jissen PachiSlot Hisshōhō! Hokuto no Ken DS 実戦パチスロ必勝法！ 北斗の拳 DS: JPN: June 4, 2005; – Nintendo DS | Notes: Port of Jissen PachiSlot Hisshōhō! Hokuto no Ken. |
| Jissen PachiSlot Hisshōhō! Hokuto no Ken Portable 実戦パチスロ必勝法！ 北斗の拳 ポータブル: JPN: August 10, 2005; – PlayStation Portable | Notes: Port of Jissen PachiSlot Hisshōhō! Hokuto no Ken. |
| Jissen Pachinko Hisshōhō! CR Hokuto no Ken 実戦パチンコ必勝法! CR 北斗の拳: JPN: December 22, 2005; – PlayStation 2 | Notes: A simulated version of the CR Hokuto no Ken pachinko machine. It simulates the Denshō and Tomo versions of the machine. |
| Jissen PachiSlot Hisshōhō! Hokuto no Ken SE 実戦パチスロ必勝法！ 北斗の拳 SE: JPN: August 3, 2006; – PlayStation 2 | Notes: A simulated version of the Hokuto no Ken SE pachislot machine.; A limited edition was also released featuring a set of stickers and straps. |
| Jissen PachiSlot Hisshōhō! Hokuto no Ken SE DS 実戦パチスロ必勝法！ 北斗の拳 SE DS: JPN: August 10, 2006; – Nintendo DS | Notes: Port of Jissen PachiSlot Hisshōhō! Hokuto no Ken SE. |
| Jissen PachiSlot Hisshōhō! Hokuto no Ken SE Portable 実戦パチスロ必勝法！ 北斗の拳 SE ポータブル: JPN: August 10, 2006; – PlayStation Portable | Notes: Port of Jissen PachiSlot Hisshōhō! Hokuto no Ken SE. |
| Jissen Pachi-Slot Pachinko Hisshōhō! Hokuto no Ken Wii 実戦パチスロ・パチンコ必勝法！北斗の拳 Ｗｉｉ: JPN: May 24, 2007; – Wii | Notes: A compilation featuring simulated versions of Pachislot Hokuto no Ken, Pachislot Hokuto no Ken SE, CR Hokuto no Ken and Digihane CR Hokuto no Ken |
| Jissen PachiSlot Hisshōhō! Hokuto no Ken 2 Ransei Haō Den Tenha no Shō 実戦パチスロ必勝法！ 北斗の拳２ 乱世覇王伝 天覇の章: JPN: October 11, 2007; – PlayStation 2 | Notes: Simulated version of Pachislot Hokuto no Ken 2. |
| Jissen PachiSlot Hisshōhō! Hokuto no Ken R: Seikimatsu Kyūseishu Densetsu 実戦パチスロ必勝法！ 北斗の拳Ｆ 世紀末救世主伝説: JPN: May 31, 2012; – PlayStation 3 | Notes: Simulated version of Pachislot Hokuto no Ken F. |

== Crossover games ==
| Game | Details |
|---|---|
| Famicom Jump: Hero Retsuden Original release date(s): JPN: February 22, 1988 | Release years by system: 1988 - Family Computer |
| Famicom Jump: Hero Retsuden Original release date(s): JPN: February 22, 1988 | Notes: Action RPG released by Bandai. It features Kenshiro as one of the 16 heroes in the game, along with Hyoh, Kaioh, and Raoh as bosses, and Lin and Akasachi as NPCs. |
| Jump Ultimate Stars Original release date(s): JPN: November 23, 2006 | Release years by system: 2006 - Nintendo DS |
| Jump Ultimate Stars Original release date(s): JPN: November 23, 2006 | Notes: Action fighting game released by Nintendo and developed by Ganbarion. It features Kenshiro and Raoh as playable characters, along with Rei and Toki as support characters, and Yuria, Lin, and Bat as help panels. |
| J-Stars Victory VS Original release date(s): JPN: March 19, 2014; EU: June 26, 2015; NA: June 30, 2015 | Release years by system: 2014 - PlayStation 3/PlayStation Vita; 2015 - PlayStation 4 |
| J-Stars Victory VS Original release date(s): JPN: March 19, 2014; EU: June 26, 2015; NA: June 30, 2015 | Notes: Action fighting game developed by Spike Chunsoft and published by Namco Bandai Games. It features Kenshiro and Raoh as playable characters. |
| Jump Force Original release date(s): WW: February 15, 2019 | Release years by system: 2019 - Microsoft Windows/PlayStation 4/Xbox One; 2020 - Nintendo Switch |
| Jump Force Original release date(s): WW: February 15, 2019 | Notes: Action fighting game developed by Spike Chunsoft and published by Namco Bandai Games. It features Kenshiro as a playable character. |
| Mahjong Fight Club Sp Original release date(s): JP: August 30, 2013 | Release years by system: 2013 - iOS; 2014 - Android |
| Mahjong Fight Club Sp Original release date(s): JP: August 30, 2013 | Notes: Mahjong game developed and published by Konami. It features as a Fist of the North Star event. |
| Fatal Fury: City of the Wolves Original release date(s): WW: April 24, 2025 | Release years by system: 2025 - Microsoft Windows/PlayStation 4/PlayStation 5/Xbox Series X/S |
| Fatal Fury: City of the Wolves Original release date(s): WW: April 24, 2025 | Notes: Fighting game developed and published by SNK. Kenshiro appears as a playable character via downloadable content. |
