= Fist of the North Star (disambiguation) =

Fist of the North Star is a manga and anime series that was originally serialized from 1983 to 1988 in the Japanese Weekly Shonen Jump.

Fist of the North Star may also refer to:

- Fist of the North Star (1986 film), a Japanese animated film
- Fist of the North Star (1995 film), an American live-action film
- Fist of the North Star (NES video game), a video game for the Nintendo Entertainment System
- Fist of the North Star: 10 Big Brawls for the King of the Universe, a fighting game for the Game Boy
- Fist of the North Star (2005 video game), a fighting game released to arcades
- Fist of the North Star: Ken's Rage, a 2010 3D beat 'em up video game
- Fist of the North Star: Lost Paradise, a 2018 action-adventure video game
