= Hokuto Gaiden =

Series of works based on the Hokuto no Ken manga

北斗外伝
- Manga

Jibo no Hoshi
- Written by: Akimi Kasai
- Published by: Shogakukan
- Magazine: Big Comic Superior
- Original run: March 10, 2006 – June 8, 2007
- Volumes: 1
- Manga

Sōkoku no Garō
- Written by: Yasuyuki Nekoi
- Published by: Shinchosha
- Magazine: Weekly Comic Bunch
- Original run: May 11, 2007 – July 31, 2009
- Volumes: 6
- Manga

Shirogane no Seija
- Written by: Yuka Nagate
- Published by: Shinchosha
- Magazine: Weekly Comic Bunch
- Original run: September 7, 2007 – December 12, 2008
- Volumes: 6
- Manga

Gokuaku no Hana
- Written by: Sin-ichi Hiromoto
- Published by: Shinchosha
- Magazine: Weekly Comic Bunch
- Original run: December 26, 2008 – August 28, 2009
- Volumes: 2
- Manga

Hōkō no Kumo
- Written by: Kakurai Missile
- Published by: Shinchosha
- Magazine: Weekly Comic Bunch
- Original run: January 21, 2010 – October 9, 2010
- Volumes: 2
- Manga

Kin'yoku no Garuda
- Written by: Yoshiji Yamaguchi
- Published by: Tokuma Shoten
- Magazine: Comic Zenon
- Original run: April 2013 – September 2013
- Volumes: 1
- Manga

Taisen Amiba no Isekai Haо̄ Densetsu - Isekai ni Itte mo Ore wa Tensai da!! N? Machigatta ka na...
- Written by: Sora Nishiki
- Illustrated by: Nattō Gohan
- Published by: Coamix
- Magazine: Comic Zenon
- Original run: October 25, 2021 – present
- Volumes: 6
- Related
- Legends of the Dark King; DD Fist of the North Star; Hokuto no Ken: Ichigo Aji; Elegy for the Henchmen

Hokuto Gaiden (Japanese: 北斗外伝) is a series of spin-off works by various authors based on the Hokuto no Ken (Fist of the North Star) manga by Buronson and Tetsuo Hara. They were all published in Weekly Comic Bunch between 2006 and 2010, with the exception of Jibo no Hoshi, which was published in Big Comic Superior. Each spin-off is set at some point during the Hokuto no Ken continuity and features a supporting character from the original manga as a protagonist.

After Weekly Comic Bunch ceased publication in 2010, Coamix would focus on more satirical spin-offs such as DD Hokuto no Ken (published on Monthly Comic Zenon) and Hokuto no Ken: Ichigo Aji (published online in Web Comic Zenyon). However, an additional side-story serial, titled Kin'yoku no Garuda was published in Comic Zenon in 2013, while additional side-stories would appear in the form of back-up stories for Ichigo Aji.

== Titles ==
=== Ten no Haō ===
Ten no Haō: Hokuto no Ken: Raō Gaiden (天の覇王 北斗の拳 ラオウ外伝; lit. "Fist of the North Star: Raoh Side Story: Tyrant of the Heavens") by Youkow Osada was serialized in Weekly Comic Bunch from issues #231 (March 24, 2006) through #300 (August 24–31, 2007). It was adapted into a 13-episode anime series, which aired on Tokyo MX from October to December 2008. The series was released by Sentai Filmworks on Region 1 DVD in 2009, with an English dub released in 2010.

The manga focuses on Raoh, the eldest of the four Hokuto Brothers, as he seeks to use his strength to restore order in the post-apocalyptic world alongside his childhood friends Reina and Souga.

=== Jibo no Hoshi ===
Hokuto no Ken: Yuria Gaiden: Jibo no Hoshi (北斗の拳 ユリア外伝 慈母の星; "Fist of the North Star: Yuria Side Story: The Affectionate Mother Star") by Akimi Asai, was published in Big Comic Superior by Shogakukan. It was initially serialized as a limited series that ran from three issues, from March 10 to April 14, 2006. A second limited series was published in the following year, which lasted six issues from March 9 to June 8, 2007. Both runs were collected in a single tankōbon released on September 4, 2007.

The title centers around Yuria's youth prior to the nuclear holocaust and how she discovers her precognition ability (which was first established in the 2006 OVA Yuria Den).

=== Sōkoku no Garō ===
Sōkoku no Garō: Hokuto no Ken: Rei Gaiden (蒼黒の餓狼 -北斗の拳 レイ外伝-) (Note: Stylized as Bloody Wolf's Darkness Blue: Fist of the North Star: Rei Side Story in the collected editions.) by Yasuyuki Nekoi was serialized in the Weekly Comic Bunch from issues #286 (May 11–18, 2007) to 393 (July 31, 2009), lasting six collected editions.

The title centers around Rei, master of the elegant assassination art of Nanto Suichōken. He returns to his home village after the Nuclear War, only to find his parents mortally wounded and his sister Aili missing. With his dying breath, Rei's father tells him that a man with seven scars on his chest was the one who attacked them and kidnapped Aili. Now Rei wanders the wasteland as he encounters numerous bandits and warlords, including acquaintances from his training days at the Nanto Seiken school, in his quest to find and rescue Aili。

Prior to drawing Sōkoku no Garō, Nekoi also drew a pair of one-shots starring Rei under the title of Hokuto no Ken: Rei Gaiden: Kareinaru Fukushūsha (北斗の拳 レイ外伝 華麗なる復讐者; "The Splendid Avenger"). The first one shot was featured in the Hokuto no Ken tribute issue of Comic Bunch published on April 5, 2006. The second one-shot was in the Sōten no Ken tribute issue published on January 8, 2007. Neither one-shots were republished in the collected volumes.

=== Shirogane no Seija ===
Shirogane no Seija: Hokuto no Ken: Toki Gaiden (銀(しろがね)の聖者 北斗の拳 トキ外伝), (Note: Stylized as Silvery Savior: Fist of the North Star: Toki Side Story in the collected editions.) by Yuka Nagate, was published in Weekly Comic Bunch from issues #301 (September 7, 2007) to 363 (December 12, 2008).

The manga centers around Toki, the second of four honorary brothers trained in the art of Hokuto Shinken, was said to possess the most graceful skills out of the four brothers. However, he was forced to surrender his pursuit of the succession after being bathed in a radioactive fallout during the Nuclear War, and began wandering the wasteland with no aim, accompanied by his servant Ramo.

During his journey, Toki stumbles into a village where all its residents are on the verge on death due to an illness. Toki decides to heal everyone in the village and on the very next day, everyone is miraculously healed. The villagers welcomed Toki with open arms for restoring his hope and Toki sees this as an opportunity to accomplish his lifelong dream of becoming a doctor by opening his own clinic in the village. The place becomes known as the "Village of Miracles" and begins to attract the unwanted attention of various bandits and ravagers.

=== Gokuaku no Hana ===
Gokuaku no Hana: Hokuto no Ken: Jagi Gaiden (極悪ノ華 北斗の拳 ジャギ外伝; "Flower of Carnage: Fist of the North Star Jagi Side-Story") by Sin-ichi Hiromoto was published in the Weekly Comic Bunch from issues #366 (January 1–16, 2009) to #396 (August 21–28, 2009) and republished in a two-volume collected edition. The series underwent a four months hiatus between issues #380 to 393, due to Hiromoto being hospitalized for an injury. During the hiatus a special chapter titled Aku no Kadō (悪の花道; "Flower Arrangement of Evil") was published on Comic Bunch #383 (May 22, 2009), drawn by Hiromoto while he was hospitalized, but was not included in the later collected edition.

The manga centers around Jagi before becoming the masked villain he turned out to be in Fist of the North Star, depicting him as a young child seeking the affection of his adoptive father Ryuken. One day, Ryuken suddenly brings two older boys (Raoh and Toki) to live with Jagi, who are being trained in Ryuken's martial art of Hokuto Shinken. Feeling left out and rejected, Jagi does everything possible to convince Ryuken to teach him the art as well. When Jagi finally becomes Ryuken's newest disciple, he learns that Kenshiro, a younger boy, has already become Ryuken's disciple before him.

The second volume of the tankōbon collection contains a one-shot titled Hokuto no Ken: Ryūken Gaiden: The Judgment Day (北斗の拳 リュウケン外伝 THE JUDGEMENT DAY), which was previously published in the Sōten no Ken tribute issue of Weekly Comic Bunch (published on January 8, 2007).

=== Hōkō no Kumo ===
Hōkō no Kumo: Hokuto no Ken: Jūza Gaiden (彷徨の曇 北斗の拳 ジュウザ外伝; "The Wandering Clouds: Fist of the North Star: Juza Side Story") by Missile Kakurai was published in Weekly Comic Bunch from issues #414 (January 2, 2010) to #445 (September 10, 2010). It was republished as a two-volume collected edition.

It centers around Juza of the Clouds as he wanders the wasteland without drive or purpose before he joined the Five Chariots and became sworn guardian to the Last General of Nanto.

=== Kin'yoku no Garuda ===
Kin'yoku no Garuda: Nanto Goshasei Zenshi (金翼のガルダ〜南斗五車星前史〜; "The Gold Winged Garuda: The Prehistory of the Five Chariot Stars of Nanto) by Yoshiji Yamaguchi was published on Comic Zenon from issues #29 (April 2013) to 34 (September 2013).

Unlike the earlier side-story spinoffs that were published in Comic Bunch, which focused on established characters, Kin'yoku no Garuda stars a new character who was designed by Tetsuo Hara himself for the pachislot game Hokuto no Ken: Tensei no Shō (北斗の拳 転生の章). The titular character, Garuda, is the successor of the Nanto Shinchōken (南斗神鳥拳; "South Dipper Divine Bird Fist") style, who initially seeks to usurp the Last General of Nanto.

=== Taisen Amiba no Isekai Haо̄ Densetsu - Isekai ni Itte mo Ore wa Tensai da!! N? Machigatta ka na... ===
An isekai spin-off series centered around the character Amiba began serialization in Comic Zenon on October 25, 2021.

== List of volumes ==
- Jibo no Hoshi: ISBN 978-4-09-181478-4
- Sōkoku no Garō
  - Volume 1: ISBN 978-4-10-771359-9
  - Volume 2: ISBN 978-4-10-771379-7
  - Volume 3: ISBN 978-4-10-771414-5
  - Volume 4: ISBN 978-4-10-771459-6
  - Volume 5: ISBN 978-4-10-771481-7
  - Volume 6: ISBN 978-4-10-771502-9
- Shirogane no Seija
  - Volume 1: ISBN 978-4-10-771368-1
  - Volume 2: ISBN 978-4-10-771383-4
  - Volume 3: ISBN 978-4-10-771404-6
  - Volume 4: ISBN 978-4-10-771415-2
  - Volume 5: ISBN 978-4-10-771432-9
  - Volume 6: ISBN 978-4-10-771451-0
- Gokuaku no Hana
  - Volume 1: ISBN 978-4-10-771478-7
  - Volume 2: ISBN 978-4-10-771509-8
- Hōkō no Kumo
  - Volume 1: ISBN 978-4-10-771589-0
  - Volume 2: ISBN 978-4-10-771590-6
- Kinyoku no Garuda: ISBN 978-4-19-980164-8
