= Fist of the North Star: Lost Paradise =

2018 video game

- North American box art
- Developer: Ryu Ga Gotoku Studio
- Publisher: Sega
- Directors: Jun Orihara; Nobuhiro Suzuki
- Producers: Masayoshi Yokoyama; Jonathan Rodgers
- Designer: Michio Abe
- Programmer: Yutaka Ito
- Writer: Masayoshi Yokoyama
- Composers: Hidenori Shoji; Yuri Fukuda; Chihiro Aoki; Saori Yoshida
- Series: Yakuza; Fist of the North Star
- Platform: PlayStation 4
- Release: JP: March 8, 2018; WW: October 2, 2018
- Genres: Action role-playing, beat 'em up
- Mode: Single-player

Fist of the North Star: Lost Paradise (Note: Known in Japan as Hokuto ga Gotoku (Japanese: 北斗が如く; "Like the Big Dipper"). The Japanese title of the Fist of the North Star series, Hokuto no Ken, means "Fist of the Big Dipper".) is a 2018 action role-playing video game developed by Ryu Ga Gotoku Studio and published by Sega for the PlayStation 4. It is based on the manga franchise Fist of the North Star by Buronson and Tetsuo Hara, and features the gameplay and mechanics of Sega's Yakuza game series. It was released in Japan on March 8, 2018, and worldwide on October 2, 2018.

== Gameplay ==
Lost Paradise is an action role-playing game played from a third-person perspective. It features experience points, abilities; and similar action-adventure gameplay mechanics and systems to Sega's own Yakuza series. Players explore the city of Eden, fighting through enemy encounters in a beat 'em up gameplay style, punctuated by quick time events.

The action is centered on the "Hidden Channeling Points" system, one of the key elements of Hokuto Shinken, the main fictional martial arts style of the series. There are also various mini-games, such as bartending, baseball, racing, and retro games such as Hokuto no Ken for the Sega Mark III, Space Harrier, Out Run and Super Hang-On, that can be played after being salvaged from the wastelands.

== Plot ==
=== Setting ===
The story takes place in a post-apocalyptic Earth, after a worldwide nuclear war of the year 199X. Due to the war, the Earth's surface became devoid of vegetation, the seas evaporated and civilization was thrown into chaos, turning everyday life into a battle for supplies of uncontaminated food and water, where the strong survive by preying on the weak. However, there is a place called "The City of Miracles," a city named "Eden". Eden receives energy and water from a giant dome-shaped relic of the old world named "Sphere City". Citizens of Eden live a comfortable life that others in this era cannot even imagine.

Kenshiro, the fourth brother and successor of the martial art Hokuto Shinken, was defeated by Shin, who proceeded to kidnap his fiancée, Yuria. Kenshiro thus travels through the wastelands to find his beloved. He eventually hears rumors that a woman called Yuria could be found in Eden so he makes his way there to find Yuria.

=== Synopsis ===
Kenshiro ascends Shin's tower, to duel him and find Yuria; defeated and dying, Shin laments that she is dead. Later, however, rumors surface that Yuria is alive in Eden. Finding the city locked off to outsiders, Kenshiro allows himself to be captured as a criminal before learning he can earn his freedom through a tournament. After defeating the final contender, Devil Rebirth, Kenshiro is given citizenship by the ruler, Xsana. Kenshiro later faces the Army of Ruin, a bandit horde led by Kyo-Oh and his second-in-command Targa. Jagre, Eden's watch captain, is afflicted with a mind condition by Kyo-Oh's fighting style, so Kenshiro journeys to the legendary prison, Cassandra, to find Toki: the second brother of Hokuto Shinken and a master healer. After Kenshiro defeats the guards and kills warden Uighur, Toki cures Jagre but refuses to leave as Raoh, the first brother to Hokuto Shinken, would rain destruction if he escaped; however, Toki agrees to train Kenshiro in healing arts. Meanwhile, Kenshiro befriends Jagre, as well as Lyra, who manages Eden's nightclub.

Kenshiro is challenged by Rei, accused of killing his parents and kidnapping his sister Airi. After Kenshiro defeats him, Airi is found and Kenshiro cures her blindness. Xsana reveals that Yuria is within Sphere City, in a room called the Chamber of Miracles. Her father, Nadai, entered the chamber years before with his dying wife, only for Xsana to witness him murder her, leading Xsana to kill him. After Yuria entered, the doors sealed; only Nadai could open them. To try and spot Yuria through Sphere City's dome, Kenshiro and Jagre climb a nearby mountain, passing a village of zombie-like villagers; maddened victims of Meito Kieiken, Kyo-Oh's style. At the summit, Kenshiro is challenged by a man who reveals himself to be a still-living Nadai upon defeat. Eden then comes under siege by the Holy Imperial Army, led by Thouzer. Kenshiro finds that Hokuto Shinken is ineffective against Thouzer, but defeats him after deducing that his immunity is due to situs inversus. With Eden's gate destroyed, Xsana decides to open up the city's walls, ending Eden's isolation. Rei and Kenshiro finally track down Airi's kidnapper hiding in Eden: Jagi, the third brother of Hokuto Shinken. Kenshiro challenges Jagi to a duel at the arena, and gains the upper hand thanks to Nadai, allowing Rei to execute Jagi, thanking Kenshiro and leaving with Airi. Meanwhile, Targa is sent back to the Army of Ruin.

Sphere City is suddenly activated; Xsana reveals it is an advanced military facility housing nuclear missiles, their launch tied to Yuria's awakening in the Chamber. Raoh arrives, revealing that he and Nadai were working to preserve this secret and prevent any chance of the missiles launching. Nadai had used the Chamber, with its special life-support casket, to heal his wife, but she had refused: using it counts down a timer for the launch. Raoh, meanwhile, had wished to keep Yuria alive to use her innate powers. With Nadai presumed dead, Raoh decides to kill Yuria to prevent the launch, but Kenshiro reveals otherwise, and challenges Raoh to a duel that ends in a draw. Concluding that Kyo-Oh and Nadai are the same person, Kenshiro infiltrates the Army of Ruin's camp to convince him to help. However, this Kyo-Oh turns out to be Targa in disguise, buying time for Nadai to enter Sphere City and kill Yuria. Kenshiro runs back to Eden and finds Nadai, but they are ambushed by Targa, Jagre and Lyra. The three have collaborated to exact revenge on Nadai for killing Jagre's father and driving the other two's parents insane. However, Jagre, secretly in love with Xsana, refuses to harm her, so Targa shoots him and Lyra, revealing his intentions to use the missiles to wipe out Earth's population, become a god, and conceive a child with Yuria. After killing Targa, Kenshiro seals Sphere City's dome to contain the launching missiles, opening the casket to spend his final moments with an awakened Yuria. However, Nadai seals them in the casket, sacrificing himself. Xsana and a surviving Jagre continue to rule and protect Eden, while Kenshiro and Yuria decide to forge their own path, together at last.

== Development and marketing ==
Lost Paradise was announced on August 26, 2017, for PlayStation 4. Studio head Toshihiro Nagoshi elaborated that the title would not make use of their new Dragon Engine, developed for Yakuza 6, as the development team was composed of largely new staff, who were not used to the more demanding tools of the Dragon Engine.

The Japanese voice cast features many of the actors from the Yakuza series portraying characters analogous to those they played in previous Yakuza titles, such as Kazuma Kiryu voice actor Takaya Kuroda playing Kenshiro. The worldwide release of the game includes an English dub, making it the studio's third game since the original Yakuza and Binary Domain to feature one. It is also the first Fist of the North Star game since the first Ken's Rage to have an English dub, as Ken's Rage 2 did not have one due to budget constraints. The worldwide release also includes an option to increase the amount of in-game gore that is exhibited on screen.

Sega launched a marketing campaign in Japan, starring actor Takayuki Yamada. In the ad campaign, the actor goes to the gym, performing famous moves and gestures from the manga series. During E3 2018, Sega announced the western release of Lost Paradise with a trailer and a large presence at Sega's booth. An additional piece of downloadable content allows players to control Yakuza protagonist Kazuma Kiryu in place of Kenshiro, and was briefly available for free for the first two weeks after launch.

== Reception ==
Reception

Aggregate scores
Aggregator	Score
Metacritic	72/100
OpenCritic	45% recommend (Note: Based on 47 reviews)

Review scores
Publication	Score
Computer Games Magazine	7/10
Destructoid	6/10
Electronic Gaming Monthly	4/5
Famitsu	35/40
Game Informer	7/10
GameSpot	8/10
Push Square	8/10

Fist of the North Star Lost Paradise was a success in Japan where it sold 123,116 copies in its first week of release. It became the first game of 2018 to topple Capcom's Monster Hunter: World which remained at the top of the charts for seven consecutive weeks.

The game won the award for "Writing in a Comedy" at the National Academy of Video Game Trade Reviewers Awards, whereas its other nomination was for "Game, Franchise Action".
