= Black Belt (1986 video game) =

1986 video game

- North American and European box art
- Developer: Sega
- Publisher: Sega
- Programmer: Yuji Naka
- Composer: Katsuhiro Hayashi
- Platform: Master System
- Release: JP: July 20, 1986; NA: November 1986; EU: August 1987
- Genre: Beat 'em up
- Modes: Single-player, multiplayer

Black Belt is a 1986 beat 'em up game developed and published by Sega for the Master System. The story follows Riki, a martial artist on a mission to save his girlfriend from his rival. Gameplay consists of a series of side-scrolling stages where the player battles waves of minor enemies and the occasional sub-boss. Stages culminate in more challenging boss encounters, each requiring the player to use a specific attack to win.

The game is a modification of the Japanese Mark III title, Hokuto no Ken, (Note: Japanese: 北斗の拳) based on the manga series of the same name, which is known as Fist of the North Star outside Japan. The export version of the game was released without this license, forcing alterations to character names and graphics. It is one of the earliest works of programmer Yuji Naka prior to his involvement in Sonic the Hedgehog.

First released in Japan in July 1986, Black Belt was localized for North America, Europe, and Brazil. Japan also saw a Wii Virtual Console re-release and a PlayStation 2 remake as part of the Sega Ages line. While commonly compared to Irem's Kung-Fu Master in both visuals and mechanics, Black Belt received mixed reactions from critics with some consensus on its boss fights being a positive highlight and its levels being too repetitive.

== Plot and gameplay ==
The player character Riki battles enemies in the third chapter. The player's health meter, remaining time, and score are displayed at the top.

Black Belt is a beat 'em up in which the player takes control of a martial artist named Riki (Note: Named Kenshiro (ケンシロウ, Kenshirō) in the original Japanese version), who sets out to rescue his girlfriend Kyoko (Note: Named Yuria (ユリア, Yuria) in the original Japanese version) from his rival Wang (Note: Named Raoh (ラオウ, Raō) in the original Japanese version). The game is composed of a series of left-to-right, side-scrolling stages (or "chapters") in which Riki must utilize punches, kicks, and jumps to defeat different types of minor underlings and the occasional sub-boss. The player's health meter, remaining time, and score are displayed along the top of the screen. The score is increased by landing hits and defeating enemies. Should all the player's health or time deplete, one life is lost. Additional health, time, and lives can be earned by increasing the score. Power-ups containing health, time, or temporary invincibility will also sometimes cross the top of the screen, requiring the player to perform a high jump to reach them.

The player must confront and defeat a boss at the end of each stage to advance to the next chapter. These are one-on-one battles where the boss's health is displayed by a second meter under the player's own. The character sprites for these fights are larger and more detailed. Each boss is susceptible to only one type of attack, demanding that the player exploit their opponent's weakness and use it to finish them off. The game contains an option that allows a second player to alternate with the first.

== Development and release ==
Black Belt was developed and published by Sega. In Japan, the game was titled Hokuto no Ken and was an adaptation of the manga of the same name. Mutsuhiro Fujii recalled that the company's design teams were working on about 20 titles simultaneously by the time the Mark III went to market. Having just acquired the Hokuto no Ken license, his team created this game utilizing the console's improved one megabit cartridge technology.

While Fujii served an unknown role in its production, it was programmed by Yuji Naka prior to his involvement in the creation of Sonic the Hedgehog. Naka also created the bosses and enemies after having been given a rough outline of them from the planner. When he was unsure about their design he would read the relevant parts of the manga. Naka revealed that the team questioned if it was appropriate to integrate certain parts of the story into requirements for defeating bosses if some players were unfamiliar with the source material. For instance, one of the minibosses, Heart, can only be defeated by hitting his stomach. Naka was heavily exposed to Hokuto no Ken through a friend before he accepted the Sega job, but professed he was not a fan. He said it would have been interesting to see his career path had he done more fighting games. The game's music and sound was composed by Katsuhiro Hayashi.

Hokuto no Ken was released in Japan on July 20, 1986. The Black Belt localized version was first shown the month prior at the Summer Consumer Electronics Show alongside the Master System and its starting lineup of software titles for regions outside Japan. Major alterations were made during localization to remove all ties to the Hokuto no Ken property. For Black Belt, most of the character sprites and backgrounds were changed, some of the music is different, and more health restoratives were added. The gameplay mechanics remain the same and the lesser enemies still die by exploding into bits. Black Belt was released in North America in November 1986 and in Europe in August 1987. Ariolasoft held the distribution rights to the game in the United Kingdom, Germany, and Holland. However, due to violence, the game was banned from sale to those under age 18 in Germany per the Protection of Young Persons Act from 1987 to 2012. Tec Toy published the game in Brazil.

Sega developed a 1989 sequel for the Mega Drive, which was released internationally as Last Battle and was once again stripped of the Hokuto no Ken license. An enhanced remake of Hokuto no Ken featuring 3D polygonal graphics was released for the PlayStation 2 in Japan on March 25, 2004 as the 11th entry in Sega's Sega Ages 2500 line, with the original version added as a bonus. Its inclusion was specifically requested by Naka. The Mark III version was digitally re-released in Japan for the Wii via the Virtual Console service on February 26, 2008. Naka was consulted about a software bug found in this emulation's ROM image and promptly fixed it just by looking at its code. The original game can also be unlocked in the 2018 PlayStation 4 title Fist of the North Star: Lost Paradise. The western release of Lost Paradise retains the original Japanese rendition of Hokuto no Ken rather than its Black Belt counterpart. Music tracks from both the Mark III and Master System versions were included on the Sega SG-1000 30th Anniversary Collection album released by Wave Master in Japan on July 31, 2013.

== Reception and legacy ==
Reception

Review scores
Publication	Score
Computer and Video Games	80% 81%
Génération 4	85%
IGN	5/10
Mean Machines Sega	81%
Console XS	41%
Sega Power	2/5
Sega Pro	50% 41%

Critical reception for Black Belt has been mixed. Print and online media outlets disagreed on the quality of its visuals and gameplay while commonly comparing it to Irem's Kung-Fu Master. A duplicate review from Mean Machines Sega and Computer and Video Games in their "Complete Guide to Consoles" highly recommended Black Belt for being "tough and challenging" and one of Sega's better beat 'em ups. Hardcore Gaming 101 founder Kurt Kulata noted it as "little more than a rip-off" of Kung-Fu Master" but with better controls and more varied level design. Combined with "fantastic visuals" such as its "extremely impressive" use of parallax scrolling for backgrounds, he declared Black Belt one of the Master System's finest games in the console's early line-up. Kulata, Levi Buchanan of IGN, and the French magazine Génération 4 all described the one-on-one fighting boss battles as its highlight. Both Kukata and Buchanan noted this preceded the same feature popularized in Capcom's Street Fighter. Computer Entertainer editor Celeste Dolan positively likened the protagonist's superhuman abilities to those seen in some martial arts films, concluding that the game contained "good, frenzied action with plenty of challenge". Retronauts was recommendatory of the original Japanese version owing to its graphics, fast-paced action, and faithfulness to its source material. The writers declared, "It's definitely a game that shows its age but compared to the licensed shovelware of the era (not least of all, the very similar but far worse Hokuto no Ken game released for Famicom just weeks after this one) it's not hard to see why this game is still fondly remembered as both a great Hokuto no Ken game and a great Mark III title."

Computer Gaming World labeled Black Belt a "straight ahead imitator" of Kung-Fu Master and the most traditional among Sega's Master System martial arts games. The magazine commended the game's inclusion of a basic plot and its instruction booklet's differentiation of oriental combat styles but mocked its translation. Buchanan criticized the potential for the player to die during boss fights and then have to start the entire game over. Several critics believed the gameplay of fighting through waves of enemies to be monotonous. Sega Power contributor Steve Jarrett found the end-stage bosses to be decent but the stages leading up to them to be "painfully repetitive". Another duplicate assessment in Console XS and Sega Pro likewise described the objectives as "unexciting and repetitive" as well as "criminally easy" while additionally calling the graphics "incredibly poor". Dolan appreciated the game's presentation overall but was dismayed by the lack of detail in the character sprites and an excessive amount of flicker. Websites including IGN, CBR, Screen Rant, and Sports Illustrated all mentioned the localized box art of Black Belt as being among the worst of generally bad Master System game covers.

Sega claimed that the game contributed to Japanese Mark III hardware sales upon its release, though the console suffered slow sales in the region overall during its lifespan with only about 80 of its total 360 games being released there.
