= Last Battle (video game) =

1989 video game

- Developers: Sega; Creative Materials (Amiga)
- Publishers: Sega; Elite (Amiga, C64)
- Director: Katsuhiro Hasegawa
- Programmers: Tatsuo Matsuda; Hiroshi Momota
- Artists: Naoto Ohshima; Yasushi Yamaguchi
- Platforms: Mega Drive/Genesis, Commodore 64, Amiga
- Release: Mega Drive: JP: July 1, 1989; NA: August 1989; EU: 1990; Amiga, C64: EU: 1991
- Genre: Beat 'em up
- Mode: Single-player

Last Battle: Legend of the Final Hero is a side-scrolling martial arts beat 'em up released for the Mega Drive/Genesis in 1989 by Sega. It was one of the six games that were available as part of the Genesis launch lineup in the U.S. The Japanese version, titled Hokuto no Ken: Shinseikimatsu Kyūseishu Densetsu (北斗の拳 新世紀末救世主伝説; lit. "Fist of the North Star: The New Legend of the Post-Apocalyptic Messiah"), is based on the manga and anime series Fist of the North Star (Hokuto no Ken in Japanese). Since the international version did not retain the Hokuto no Ken license, the graphics and characters' names were altered. It was the second Hokuto no Ken game released by Sega, following the Mark III original, released internationally as Black Belt. Versions for the Commodore 64 and Amiga based upon Last Battle were developed and released by Elite in Europe in 1991.

== Gameplay ==
Last Battle is a side-scrolling action game similarly to its predecessor Black Belt. The player takes control of Aarzak (Kenshiro in the Japanese original), who fights against his enemies using his punches and kicks. Aarzak can attack while standing, jumping, and crouching, for a total of six basic attacks. In addition to his life gauge, Aarzak has a power-up meter that will gradually fill as he defeats enemies. When the meter reaches a certain point (depending on the stage), Aarzak will transform into a super-powered state, allowing him to perform rapid punches and kicks for the rest of the stage. The game's levels (with the exception of boss battles and maze stages) feature a time limit at the lower-right corner of the screen; but unlike other time limits, instead of killing the character immediately when it reaches zero, it will instead gradually drain the player's life gauge until the player completes the level.

The game is divided into four stages or chapters, each featuring several levels. After completing a level the player will be shown a map which displays the player's current location and the paths they can take. Most of the levels are linear side-scrolling segments where the player must simply walk from one to side to the other while fighting every enemy who gets in the way. Other levels are dungeon mazes in which the player must figure out the correct path to the goal while avoiding traps. The player will encounter various allies throughout the game that will increase Aarzak's offensive or defensive strength, or replenish his health. The game features several one-on-one encounters with bosses as well. The player must sometimes complete levels in a certain order in order to finish a chapter.

== Ports ==
Because the English localization of the game did not retain the Fist of the North Star license, the developers changed the names of all characters, as well as their fighting styles, although the plot is relatively unchanged. The original Japanese version is specifically based on the later chapters of the manga (chapters 137-210), which is the portion that was also covered in the Hokuto no Ken 2 TV series. Kenshiro was renamed Aarzak and his two sidekicks from the series, Bat and Lin, became Max and Alyssa. Duke, the initial antagonist is actually Falco, while the three Rashō were rewritten into rebel generals of the empire that after the defeat of Duke escaped and schemed a plot to exact their revenge on Aarzak.

Also, the blood and gore from the original game was edited out of the western localizations. In the original game, any of the normal enemies would have their heads explode, followed by their bodies in a bloody fashion as well as some boss characters having more of a gory finishes to their fights. Last Battle, however, edited down the gore so that the normal enemies would only fly offscreen when hit and many of the bloody animations for the bosses were removed or some of the bosses were recolored to look more like mutants than humans.

=== List of name changes ===
Last Battle	Hokuto no Ken
Jeet Kune Do	Hokuto Shinken
Kuk Sool Won	Hokuto Ryuken
Tang Shou Tao	Gento Koken
Aarzak	Kenshiro (ケンシロウ)
Alyssa	Lin (リン)
Max	Bat (バット)
Luisa	Mamiya (マミヤ)
Gere	Ein (アイン)
Anne	Asuka (アスカ)
Bee	Gill (ギル)
Zee	Buzz (バズ)
Syd	Solia (ソリア)
Duke	Falco (ファルコ)
Sophia	Lui (ルイ)
Dare-Devil	Akashachi (赤鯱)
Rob	Shachi (シャチ)
Cynara	Leia (レイア)
Gromm	Han (ハン)
Grozz	Hyoh (ヒョウ)
Garokk	Kaioh (カイオウ)

== Reception ==
Reception

Review scores
Publication	Score
Computer Entertainer	6/8
MegaTech	32%
Sega Pro	69%

Last Battle received mixed reviews from critics. Upon release in 1989, Computer Entertainer gave a mildly positive review, praising the visuals for exhibiting "several of the Genesis graphic capabilities that seem to be possible only with a 16-bit system" but said there "is nothing especially original about the game" though it "will suffice as the requisite game of the type because it does offer the gamer plenty of fighting action."

Later reviews were more critical in the early 1990s, with criticism towards the graphics, simplistic gameplay, repetitive level design and awkward controls. In 1992, MegaTech magazine said it was "a failure on two counts: it neither shows off any of the Mega Drive's capabilities, nor is an enjoyable game in its own right". Mega placed the game at #2 in their list of the 10 Worst Mega Drive Games of All Time.
