= Fist of the North Star =

Japanese manga series and its franchise

- First tankōbon volume cover, featuring Kenshiro

北斗の拳 (Hokuto no Ken)
- Genre: Adventure; Martial arts; Post-apocalyptic
- Manga
- Written by: Buronson
- Illustrated by: Tetsuo Hara
- Published by: Shueisha
- English publisher: NA: Viz Media; Gutsoon! Entertainment; (2003–2004)
- Imprint: Jump Comics
- Magazine: Weekly Shōnen Jump
- Original run: September 13, 1983 – August 8, 1988
- Volumes: 27
- Anime television series
- Directed by: Toyoo Ashida
- Produced by: Yoshio Takami
- Written by: Hiroshi Toda
- Music by: Nozomi Aoki
- Studio: Toei Animation
- Licensed by: Crunchyroll (streaming): NA: Discotek Media
- Original network: FNS (Fuji TV)
- English network: UK: Sci-Fi Channel; US: Showtime Beyond
- Original run: October 11, 1984 – March 5, 1987
- Episodes: 109
- Anime television series

Fist of the North Star 2
- Directed by: Toyoo Ashida
- Produced by: Yoshio Takami
- Written by: Hiroshi Toda
- Music by: Nozomi Aoki
- Studio: Toei Animation
- Licensed by: Crunchyroll (streaming): NA: Discotek Media
- Original network: FNS (Fuji TV)
- Original run: March 13, 1987 – February 18, 1988
- Episodes: 43
- Anime television series
- Directed by: Hiroshi Maeda
- Written by: Kazuhiko Inukai
- Music by: Yuki Hayashi
- Studio: TMS Entertainment
- Licensed by: Amazon Prime Video
- Original network: Tokyo MX, BS11
- Original run: April 11, 2026 – present
- Episodes: 14
- Animated films and OVAs
- Fist of the North Star (1986); New Fist of the North Star (2003–2004); Fist of the North Star: The Legends of the True Savior (2006–2008)
- Live-action film
- Fist of the North Star (1995)
- Spin-offs
- Fist of the Blue Sky; Hokuto Gaiden; Legends of the Dark King; DD Fist of the North Star; Hokuto no Ken: Ichigo Aji
- Video games
- Black Belt; Fist of the North Star (NES); Last Battle; Fighting Mania; Fist of the North Star (arcade); Fist of the North Star: Ken's Rage; Fist of the North Star: Ken's Rage 2; Fist of the North Star: Lost Paradise
- icon

Fist of the North Star (Japanese: 北斗の拳, Hepburn: Hokuto no Ken; lit. 'Fist of the Big Dipper' (Note: Hokuto (北斗), which literally means the "Northern Ladle", is the Japanese name of the Big Dipper, an asterism that forms part of the Ursa Major/Great Bear constellation, which does not correspond to the North Star Polaris (which is part of the Ursa Minor/Little Bear/Little Dipper constellation). Toei's proposed localized title for the series was Ken, the Great Bear Fist.)) is a Japanese manga series written by Buronson and illustrated by Tetsuo Hara. It was serialized in Shueisha's shōnen manga magazine Weekly Shōnen Jump for 245 issues published from 1983 to 1988 and collected in 27 tankōbon volumes under the Jump Comics imprint. Set on a post-apocalyptic Earth after a nuclear war, the story centers on a warrior named Kenshiro, the successor to a deadly martial art known as Hokuto Shinken, which gives him the ability to kill his opponents by striking their vital points, often resulting in an exceptionally violent and gory death. Kenshiro dedicates his life to fighting against the various gangs, bandits, and warlords who threaten the lives of the defenseless and innocent, as well as rival martial artists.

The manga was adapted into two anime television series produced by Toei Animation, which together aired on Fuji TV and its affiliates from 1984 through 1988, comprising a combined total of 152 episodes. It has since expanded into a media franchise, including several anime films, a live-action film, original video animations (OVAs), video games, and a series of spin-offs centering on other characters from the original story. It has also spawned a number of video games and pachinko machines produced by Sega Sammy. A new anime television series adaptation, produced by TMS Entertainment, airs in two split cours, with the first cours airing from April to June 2026, and the second cours set to premiere in 2027.

English adaptations of the manga were published by Viz Communications as a monthly comic book, and later by Gutsoon! Entertainment as a series of colorized graphic novels, although neither translation was completed. Viz Media published the manga in a series of hardcover editions from 2021 to 2025. English adaptations of other Fist of the North Star media have been licensed to other companies, including the TV series and the 1986 film.

The Fist of the North Star manga has sold over 100 million copies worldwide, making it one of the best-selling manga series. It is regarded as one of the most influential manga series of all time.

== Plot ==
A worldwide nuclear war sometime in the 1990s has resulted in the destruction of most of civilization, turning the world into a desert wasteland. The remnants of mankind fight over whatever supplies of food and uncontaminated water still remain as the strong prey on the weak. Kenshiro is the successor to Hokuto Shinken, an ancient martial art of assassination that trains its practitioners to kill from within an opponent's body through the use of hidden meridian points. Kenshiro wishes to live his life in peace, but after he is separated from his fiancée Yuria by a jealous rival, he begins his journey to become the savior of the post-apocalyptic world, defending the weak and innocent from the many gangs and organizations that threaten their survival. Along the way, Kenshiro meets a young thief named Bat and an orphaned girl named Lin, who join him as his traveling companions and bear witness to Ken's many battles.

Kenshiro's many rivals and allies include the six grandmasters of Nanto Seiken, a rival assassin's art that split into two factions after the nuclear war, as well as his own "Brothers of Hokuto", who trained alongside him for the succession of Hokuto Shinken. Kenshiro's ultimate nemesis is his eldest brother-in-training Raoh, a warrior who in an act of defiance against the law of Hokuto Shinken, refused to allow his fists to be "sealed" and ends up killing their master Ryuken. Raoh seeks to conquer the post-apocalyptic world as a warlord under the mantle of Ken-oh (拳王, Ken Ō; 'Fist King'), by challenging every martial artist he sees as a threat, including Kenshiro. After a long series of battles, Kenshiro emerges victorious over Raoh, who dies peacefully, and peace arrives in the post-apocalyptic world, concluding the first half of the story.

The second half begins several years later after a tyrannical empire under the name of the Celestial Empress has risen to power, oppressing anyone who dares to oppose them. Kenshiro returns from seclusion, joining the now-grown Bat and Lin under the banner of the Hokuto Army. As they fight their way into the Empire's capital city, they discover that the Empire has been taken over by the Viceroy Jakoh, a usurper who is keeping the real Celestial Empress captive in his dungeon. The Hokuto Army free the Empress and Jakoh is vanquished shortly afterwards.

However, Lin is taken captive by the remnants of Jakoh's forces and is sent off to the mysterious Kingdom of Shura, a brutal land of warriors ruled by three overlords who have all mastered the ways of Hokuto Ryūken, a martial art which branched off from the same clan alongside Hokuto Shinken and got corrupted into the ways of darkness. Kaioh, the head of the three overlords, plans to conquer the post-apocalyptic world in the name of evil by wiping out the followers of Hokuto Shinken. Kenshiro uncovers the sealed testament of the Hokuto Shinken founder, Shuken, which holds the secret to overcoming Kaioh's ultimate technique. Kenshiro emerges victorious over Kaioh and rescues Lin, leaving her under Bat's care. During the final chapters, Kenshiro goes on a journey with Raoh's orphaned son Ryu, in order to lead him on the path to become the next Hokuto Shinken successor, encountering and battling various opponents along the way, before returning to Bat and Lin to protect them from a past enemy.

== Production ==
In 1982, 21-year-old manga artist Tetsuo Hara was struggling with his career. His first serialized manga, the motocross racing-themed Iron Don Quijote, was discontinued after only 10 issues. A fan of Chinese martial artist and actor Bruce Lee and Japanese action film actor Yūsaku Matsuda as a teenager in the 1970s, he often drew depictions of them from memory. Hara had previously pitched the idea of a martial arts manga with a protagonist that combined the appearances and character traits of the two actors to his editor Nobuhiko Horie. But Horie instead convinced Hara to start a motocross manga based on trends at the time. Now revisiting the martial arts theme, the two realized they needed a secret signature technique, but were at a loss for ideas until Horie browsed a used Chinese book store on Suzuran Street in Jinbōchō, Tokyo. He found an anecdote of a medical student in China, who, after overstimulating an acupressure point in order to alleviate an eye issue, had instead made the condition worse. Horie believed that destroying bodies by attacking pressure points was perfect for a shōnen manga, as it allowed someone small to take out a much bigger opponent. He derived the manga's title and the name of the technique from a Chinese constellation myth that features two sages, Hokuto and Nanto, the gods of death and life respectively. The editor pictured the manga's protagonist, Kenshiro, as the son of Hokuto.

A prototype version of Fist of the North Star was published as a one-shot story in the April 1983 issue of Fresh Jump. It was chosen by readers as the best story in the magazine and featured many of the elements that would later appear in the serialized version, including Kenshiro's signature phrase: "You are already dead." It was followed by Fist of the North Star II, a second one-shot published in the June 1983 issue. Both stories were later collected in the second tankōbon volume of Iron Don Quijote (although the expanded 1995 editions move the first part of the Fist of the North Star pilot to the first volume, leaving the second volume with just the second pilot).

The final version of Fist of the North Star began serialization in Weekly Shōnen Jump on September 13, 1983. Manga author Buronson had been assigned to work with Hara as writer of the series. He was given the job after Weekly Shōnen Jump could not come to an agreement with Horie's first choice. Buronson liked Hara's one-shot version, but insisted a modern-day setting would not work with a martial arts story, so they went with a futuristic, post-apocalyptic one due to the then-popularity of the Mad Max film series. Additionally, Kenshiro, originally a teenager framed for a murder he did not commit in Hara's prototype story, became an older and more stoic hero with a tragic past. For the new setting, Hara drew inspiration from the post-apocalyptic film Mad Max 2 (1981), the cyberpunk film Blade Runner (1982), Katsuhiro Otomo's post-apocalyptic Japanese cyberpunk manga Akira (1982), and the illustrations of artists Syd Mead and Frank Frazetta. Go Nagai's manga series Violence Jack (1973), which similarly had a post-apocalyptic desert wasteland setting with biker gangs, anarchic violence, dilapidated buildings, innocent civilians, tribal chiefs and small abandoned villages, may have been another influence; it has been argued that Mad Max itself may have been influenced by Violence Jack.

Buronson was astonished by the quality of Hara's art was from the first chapter. He had asked the artist to give Kenshiro seven scars in the shape of the Big Dipper for no reason other than their appealing aesthetic. But when they then began thinking of Kenshiro's backstory and the reason he wanders the wasteland, Buronson devised that they were given from the man who stole the woman he loved. The story to Fist of the North Star was planned only two or three chapters in advance, with Horie keeping an eye on reader feedback. Buronson conceived three older brothers for Kenshiro. With Jagi representing cruelty, he made Raoh the strongest because he was the oldest, and made Toki the opposite of Raoh; a weak yet compassionate man who used his skills to heal. Buronson had previously looked at writing manga as only a way to make ends meet, but Fist of the North Star changed that. Before serialization began, he had taken a trip to Cambodia, where the genocidal regime of Pol Pot had recently fallen. Impacted by the human remains he saw piled up everywhere, it influenced his characters and the dialogue he wrote for them; the latter becoming a signature of the series. Hara was inspired by the Ultraman and Tiger Mask series to create interesting enemy designs. Fist of the North Star is known for the unique death cries shouted by enemies as they die, such as "Abeshi", "Hidebu", and "Tawaba". These were coined by Hara, who, with complete freedom to draw the action scenes, explained that he used them in order to try to add a bit of comedy to make the death scenes easier to digest. He had grown up with the strange words used in Fujio Akatsuka's manga, but the copy-editors of Fist of the North Star would often "correct" his own made-up words, which annoyed him.

Hara and Buronson seldom saw each other during serialization and never had meetings directly about work. Instead, Horie acted as go-between for the two. Hara struggled to draw 20 pages a week and described being so "burned out" that he would not bathe for three or four days. He said he viewed Horie as the "devil", as the editor did not praise him and would instead hand him the script for the next chapter immediately after he completed the previous one. Similarly, Buronson said that Horie never compromised, and that he felt like hitting the editor many times. However, Hara admitted that by not praising him, Horie helped him succeed as an artist, as he is personally the type of person who needs someone to yell at him. Originally, Hara and Buronson were contracted to do Fist of the North Star for a three-year run, but due to its popularity and the publisher's demand, it was extended to five years.

== Media ==
=== Manga ===
Fist of the North Star, written by Buronson and illustrated by Tetsuo Hara, premiered in Shueisha's shōnen manga magazine Weekly Shōnen Jump on September 13, 1983, and was serialized until August 8, 1988, lasting 245 issues. Its chapters were collected in 27 tankōbon volumes, published under Shueisha's Jump Comics imprint from March 9, 1984, to March 10, 1989. During the 1990s, Shueisha reprinted the series in a 15-volume hardcover aizōban edition from 1991 to 1992, as well as a 15-volume bunkoban edition from 1997 to 1998. The Fist of the North Star copyrights would be transferred over to Coamix, a company founded in June 2000 by Nobuhiko Horie after he left Shueisha. A 14-volume kanzenban edition was published by Shogakukan in 2006, under the Big Comics Selection imprint, featuring the original water-colored artwork from the Weekly Shōnen Jump serialization, as well as almost all of the original opening pages that were omitted in earlier editions, although it lacked the added artwork featured in previous collected editions that were drawn to replace ad spaces. To celebrate the series' 30th anniversary, Tokuma Shoten re-published the series in an "Ultimate Edition", comprising eighteen volumes that were published from September 20, 2013, to July 19, 2014. This edition features new cover illustrations by Hara and include an additional chapter in the 11th volume (see below).

==== English translations ====
In 1989, Viz Communications published the first sixteen chapters of Fist of the North Star in English as an eight-issue monthly comic. These were later reprinted in a single graphic novel collection in 1995. During the same year, Viz resumed publication of the series as a monthly comic until 1997, lasting eighteen issues (adapting chapters 17–44), divided into three parts. This second run was subsequently republished in three additional graphic novel volumes titled Night of the Jackal, Southern Cross and Blood Brothers. Viz's version featured mirrored artwork with translated sound effects and other retouched details.

In 2002, a second English adaptation was published by Gutsoon! Entertainment under the title of Fist of the North Star: Master Edition, which retained the original right-to-left orientation but featured digitally colored artwork. Each volume from the fourth one and onward featured new cover illustrations by Hara that were made specifically for the Master Edition. The Master Edition ceased publication only a year after its start in 2003, lasting only nine volumes due to Gutsoon!'s withdrawal from the North American market. These colorized editions were translated back to the Japanese market, but only four volumes were published.

In 2020, Viz Media announced a print and digital publication of the manga in hardcover editions under their Viz Signature imprint, adapted from the 2013 ultimate editions. The first volume was released on June 15, 2021, and subsequent volumes were each published on trimonthly basis, culminating with the eighteenth and final volume on September 23, 2025.

==== Follow-ups and spinoffs ====
Fist of the Blue Sky (Sōten no Ken), a prequel to Fist of the North Star written by Nobuhiko Horie and illustrated by Hara with supervision from Buronson, began publication in the premiere issue of Weekly Comic Bunch (dated May 29, 2001), a manga anthology published by Shinchosha and edited by Coamix. The title ran during the entirety of the magazine's run, initially as a regular feature and later as a semi-regular, until it ceased publication with issue #445 (dated September 10, 2010). During this period, various Fist of the North Star spinoffs by different authors were also serialized in the magazine (see Hokuto Gaiden), each focusing on a different character from the original manga. The first of these, Legends of the Dark King by Yowkow Osada, began publication in Comic Bunch #231 (cover dated March 24, 2006). It was followed by Sōkoku no Garō by Yasuyuki Nekoi in Comic Bunch #286 (May 11–18, 2007), Shirogane no Seija by Yuka Nagate in Comic Bunch #301 (September 7, 2007), Gokuaku no Hana by Sin-ichi Hiromoto in Comic Bunch #366 (January 16–21, 2009) and Hōkō no Kumo by Missile Kakurai in Comic Bunch #414 (January 22, 2010). Jibo no Hoshi by Akimi Kasai, a spinoff focused on Yuria, was also published as a limited series in Big Comic Superior for three issues in 2006, with a second run that lasted six issues in 2007.

In 2014, Buronson and Hara reunited to commemorate the 30th anniversary of the manga by producing a special two-part story for Coamix's subsequent manga anthology Monthly Comic Zenon. Titled Hokuto no Ken: Last Piece, it is set during the timeline gap between Chapters 136 and 137 of the original manga and focuses on Kokuoh, Raoh's former steed who ends up becoming Kenshiro's. The first part was published in the May 2014 issue of Comic Zenon, and the second part in the following issue. It was later included as an extra chapter in Vol. 11 of the Ultimate Edition of the original manga. Other Hokuto no Ken titles published in Comic Zenon include DD Fist of the North Star by Kajio, which started in the magazine's premiere issue (dated December 2010), Kin'yoku no Garuda, a side-story which started on Comic Zenon #29 (April 2013) and the currently ongoing Sōten no Ken: Regenesis, a sequel to the original Sōten no Ken manga drawn by Hideki Tsuji and written by Hiroyuki Yatsu which began serialization in Comic Zenon #85 (December 2017). Hokuto no Ken: Ichigo Aji written by Yūshi Kawata and illustrated by Yukito the Younger, began serialization in 2013 on Coamix's online manga anthology Web Comic Zenyon.

==== Dedicated e-reader ====
In 2018, a dedicated e-reader with 18 volumes of the manga was sold, without the option of loading anything else on to it. It had two screens that fold out like a book and sold for ¥30,000 in Japan. The read-only device was called an eOneBook and was powered by removable AAA batteries.

=== Anime ===
==== 1984 TV series ====
Fist of the North Star was first adapted into an anime television series by Toei Animation. It aired on Fuji Television from October 11, 1984, to March 5, 1987, lasting 109 episodes. It was immediately followed by a sequel series, titled Fist of the North Star 2, which aired from March 13, 1987, to February 18, 1988, lasting an additional 43 episodes for a combined total of 152 episodes between both series.

The full series was never released on VHS in Japan, although three-hour-long compilation movies were produced by Toei Video covering the first, second and fourth story arcs in that order. On July 24, 2002, Universal Music released a DVD box set containing all 152 episodes spread across 26 discs. These discs were later released as individual volumes from May 21, 2003, through January 21, 2004. Three "best of" DVD compilations were also released in 2005, each featuring seven key episodes from the series. On March 28, 2008, Avex released a 25th-anniversary edition box set featuring new video transfers of all 152 episodes remastered in high definition, once again spread across 26 discs. It features two additional discs of bonus content (including the aforementioned compilation movies).

The series aired with English subtitles on Nippon Golden Network in the late 1980s. The first 36 episodes of the first series were translated and dubbed by Manga Entertainment in 1999, although only 24 episodes were released on VHS (spread across eight tapes). All 36 episodes of the dub version were aired on Showtime Beyond in the United States and on Sci-Fi Channel in the United Kingdom, and were later released on DVD in 2003 (spread across six individual volumes). In 2008, the US subsidiary of Toei Animation produced an official subtitle-only translation of all 152 episodes, which were released on various paid download and streaming websites available only for North American customers. Discotek Media announced on October 2, 2009, that they had licensed the entire Fist of the North Star TV series. The first two boxsets were released in that year, and the latter two in 2011. The episodes use the same transfers from the 2008 DVD box set in Japan, although it did not contain any of the special features. The first set featured the first 36 episodes along with Manga Entertainment's English dub, and a Japanese audio option with English subtitles; these subtitles were adjusted from the translation of Toei's streaming episodes. Discotek later released all discs from all four boxsets (a total of 21 discs) together in one set, Fist of the North Star: The Series - The Complete Series Collection, on March 25, 2014. Discotek released the complete series as a standard definition Blu-ray set on October 31, 2017.

In 2009, William Winckler Productions produced six compilation movies dubbed in English. The movies cover major story arcs from the TV series, each one centering on a specific character (Shin, Rei, Toki, Souzer, Raoh, and Kaioh).

Crunchyroll added the series on October 30, 2025.

==== 2026 TV series ====
A new anime adaptation, Fist of the North Star: Hokuto no Ken, was announced on September 13, 2023. It was later revealed to be a CGI-animated television series produced by TMS Entertainment and directed by Hiroshi Maeda, with Kazuma Ogasawara serving as assistant director, Kazuhiko Inukai handling series composition, Naoki Hisatsune designing the characters, and Yuki Hayashi composing the music. It airs in two split cours, with the first cours airing from April 11 to June 27, 2026, on Tokyo MX and BS11, and the second cours set to premiere in 2027. The opening theme song is "Hallelujah" by Alexandros, and the ending theme is a cover of "Ai o Torimodose!!", the opening theme of the first Fist of the North Star anime, performed by Toshi. Amazon Prime Video streams the series worldwide; the platform distributes the series in its uncensored version, while a censored version is broadcast on Japanese television.

No.	Title	Directed by	Written by	Storyboarded by	Original release date
1	"A Cry from the Heart"; Transliteration: "Kokoro no Sakebi" (Japanese: 心の叫び)	Kazuma Ogasawara	Kazuhiko Inukai	Hiroshi Maeda, Kazuma Ogasawara, Hiroki Ito, Keisei Kanayama, Iwao Teraoka	April 11, 2026
2	"A Better Tomorrow"; Transliteration: "Yori Yoi Ashita e" (Japanese: 今日より明日)	Kazuma Ogasawara	Kazuhiko Inukai	Hiroshi Maeda, Kazuma Ogasawara, Hiroki Ito, Yoshinari Kanayama	April 11, 2026
3	"Southern Cross"; Transliteration: "Sazan Kurosu" (Japanese: サザンクロス)	Kazuma Ogasawara	Kosuke Miyazawa	Hiroshi Maeda, Kazuma Ogasawara, Hiroki Ito, Yoshinari Kanayama	April 18, 2026
4	"Flames of Obsession"; Transliteration: "Shūnen no Honō" (Japanese: 執念の炎)	Hiroki Ito	Kazuhiko Inukai	Hiroshi Maeda, Kazuma Ogasawara, Hiroki Ito, Yoshinari Kanayama	April 18, 2026
5	"Bloody Cross"; Transliteration: "Buraddi Kurosu" (Japanese: 血の十字架(ブラッディークロス))	Kazuma Ogasawara	Kazuhiko Inukai	Hiroshi Maeda, Kazuma Ogasawara, Hiroki Ito, Yoshinari Kanayama	April 25, 2026
6	"God's Land"; Transliteration: "Kami no Kuni" (Japanese: 神の国(ゴッドランド))	Kazuma Ogasawara	Kazuhiko Inukai	Hiroshi Maeda, Kazuma Ogasawara, Hiroki Ito, Yoshinari Kanayama	May 2, 2026
7	"The Ultimate Assassin"; Transliteration: "Kyūkyoku no Ansatsusha" (Japanese: 究極の暗殺者)	Kazuma Ogasawara	Kazuhiko Inukai	Hiroshi Maeda, Hiroshi Maeda, Kazuma Ogasawara, Hiroki Ito, Yoshinari Kanayama	May 9, 2026
8	"Messenger from the Homeland"; Transliteration: "Kokkyō Kara no Shisha" (Japanese: 故郷からの使者)	Hiroki Ito	Kosuke Miyazawa	Hiroshi Maeda, Kazuma Ogasawara, Hiroki Ito, Yoshinari Kanayama	May 16, 2026
9	"The Mad Dogs Must Die"; Transliteration: "Kyōken wa Shine" (Japanese: 狂犬ども死すべし)	Hiroki Ito	Kosuke Miyazawa	Hiroshi Maeda, Kazuma Ogasawara, Hiroki Ito, Keisei Kanayama	May 23, 2026
10	"Devil Rebirth"; Transliteration: "Debiru Ribāsu" (Japanese: 悪魔の化身(デビルリバース))	Kazuma Ogasawara	Kazuhiko Inukai	Hiroshi Maeda, Kazuma Ogasawara, Hiroki Ito, Keisei Kanayama	May 30, 2026
11	"A Man of Nanto"; Transliteration: "Nanto no Otoko" (Japanese: 南斗の男)	Kazuma Ogasawara	Kazuhiko Inukai	Hiroshi Maeda, Kazuma Ogasawara, Hiroki Ito, Keisei Kanayama	June 6, 2026
12	"Men Who Saw Her Tears" (Japanese: 涙をみた男たち)	Kazuma Ogasawara	Kazuhiko Inukai	Hiroshi Maeda, Kazuma Ogasawara, Hiroki Ito, Keisei Kanayama	June 13, 2026
13	"A Bloody Trap" (Japanese: 血塗られた罠)	Kazuma Ogasawara	Kazuhiko Inukai	Hiroshi Maeda, Kazuma Ogasawara, Hiroki Ito, Keisei Kanayama	June 20, 2026
14	"The One Who Laughs Last" (Japanese: 最後に笑う者)	Kazuma Ogasawara	Kazuhiko Inukai	Hiroshi Maeda, Kazuma Ogasawara, Hiroki Ito, Keisei Kanayama	June 27, 2026
15	"Journey to a Deadly Battle"	TBD	TBD	TBA	2027

==== Films and OVAs ====
The first animated feature film based on the series, simply titled Fist of the North Star, was produced by Toei Animation, which premiered in Japan on March 8, 1986. Produced by the same staff and cast who worked on the TV series, the movie serves as a loose adaptation of the storyline of the manga from the beginning and up to Kenshiro's first fight with Raoh, rearranging the order of events and the way the story unfolds. An English-dubbed version produced by Streamline Pictures was first released in 1991 in North America and in 1994 in Europe and Australia by Manga Entertainment.

In 2003, a three-episode original video animation (OVA) mini-series titled New Fist of the North Star was produced by OB Planning, based on a 1996 Fist of the North Star novel, Jubaku no Machi. An English dub version was produced by ADV Films in 2004.

In 2005, North Stars Pictures and TMS Entertainment announced the development of a five-part film series titled Fist of the North Star: The Legends of the True Savior. The series is composed of three theatrical films and two OVAs, which were released during a three-year period between 2006 throughout 2008, culminating with the 25th anniversary of the franchise.

At the Japanese box office, the 1986 film grossed ¥1.8 billion and Legend of Raoh: Chapter of Death in Love (2006) grossed ¥500 million, for a combined ¥2.3 billion ($29 million). Chapter of Death in Love also grossed $1,258,568 overseas, and Legend of Raoh: Chapter of Fierce Fight (2007) grossed $1,479,911 in Japan, bringing the films' total worldwide box office gross to $32 million.

=== Novels ===
An original novel was written by Buronson and Tetsuo Hara titled Shōsetsu Hokuto no Ken: Jubaku no Machi which was published by Jump Novel in Japan on December 13, 1996. The novel was the basis of the later three-episode OVA series New Fist of the North Star. A novelization of the movie Legend of Raoh: Chapter of Death in Love written by Eiichi Sakaki was published by Tokuma Novels on March 10, 2006.

There have also been two cell phone novels released via the mobile site Hokuto no Ken DX. Raoh Gaiden, a novelization of the manga of the same name, and Kenshiro Gaiden, an original novel by Jotaro Higashi.

=== Live-action film ===
An American-produced live-action movie version of Fist of the North Star was released in 1995, directed by Tony Randel based on a script by Peter Atkins and Wynne McLaughlin. The movie, loosely based on the Shin storyline of the manga, stars Gary Daniels as Kenshiro, Costas Mandylor as Shin and Japanese actress Isako Washio as Yuria, with Malcolm McDowell as Ryuken and Chris Penn as "Jackal" (actually a renamed Jagi). It also featured a cameo by professional wrestler Big Van Vader as Goliath, and Kevin Arbouet as "Rao" (unrelated to the actual Raoh from the manga). The movie was released straight-to-video in the United States and Japan (though it did receive a premiere on HBO). The Japanese dubbed version used the original voice actors from the 1980s anime series.

=== Stage musical ===
A stage musical adaptation of Fist of the North Star premiered at Nissay Theatre in December 2021, with tours across Japan in 2022 and China in 2023. It is a co-production of Horipro, Hakuhodo DY Music & Pictures, and Shanghai-based theatre performance firm Ranspace, in collaboration with Coamix. The musical is directed by Sachiko Ishimaru, with script and lyrics by Ako Takahashi, music by Frank Wildhorn, and choreography by Jasmine Chiu. It features Yūsuke Ōnuki as Kenshiro, Ayaka Hirahara and May'n as Yuria, Takuya Uehara and Kandai Ueda as Shin, Kazuki Katō, Ryūnosuke Onoda, and Ryōsei Konishi as Toki, Shōichi Fukui and Masaru Nagai as Raoh, Tatsuya Kawaguchi and Hiroaki Miyakawa as Ryuken, Rena Yamazaki and Manaka Kuwabara as Rin, Ao Watanabe as Bat, Ryōsuke Miura as Rei, Kanata Irei and Rio Uehara alternating as Rei and Juza, and Miisha Shimizu as Mamiya.

=== Video games ===
Numerous video game titles based on the Fist of the North Star have been produced since the 1986 release of the Enix adventure game, simply titled Hokuto no Ken for the PC-88. The earlier games in the franchise were released by Sega for the Mark III and Mega Drive and by Toei Animation for Nintendo's Famicom, Game Boy and Super Famicom. These titles included side-scrolling action games, role-playing video games and competitive-style fighting games. The two Sega titles were stripped of the license and rebranded for the international market under the titles of Black Belt for the Master System and Last Battle for the Sega Genesis. Two Toei titles, namely Fist of the North Star (a localized version of the Famicom's Hokuto no Ken 2) for the NES released by Taxan Soft in 1989 and Fist of the North Star: 10 Big Brawls for the King of Universe for the Game Boy released by Electro Brain in 1991, had American releases with the license intact.

Further games were released for the Sega Saturn, PlayStation, PlayStation 2 and Nintendo DS, among other platforms. In 2000, Konami released an arcade game based on the franchise titled Fighting Mania. Another arcade game, a 2D fighting game simply titled Fist of the North Star, was produced by Sega and Arc System Works in 2005. Both of these games saw international distributions, although the PS2 version of the fighting game was released exclusively in Japan. Tecmo Koei produced a Dynasty Warriors spin-off focusing on the events from the first half of the manga, titled Fist of the North Star: Ken's Rage, for the PlayStation 3. It which was released in Japan, North America, and Europe in 2010. A sequel, Fist of the North Star: Ken's Rage 2, expanded on the first game and incorporated the events from the second half of the manga. It was released in Japan in 2012 and in North America in 2013. In 2018, Sega released Fist of the North Star: Lost Paradise for the PlayStation 4. It was developed by Ryu Ga Gotoku Studio, and features gameplay elements and voice actors from their flagship series, Yakuza. Rather than adapting the manga like previous games, Lost Paradise tells an original story that significantly diverges from the events of the manga. A Fist of the North Star version of Fitness Boxing for Nintendo Switch was released in Japan on December 22, 2022, and was released in the West on March 2, 2023.

== Reception and legacy ==
Fist of the North Star was one of Weekly Shōnen Jump's most popular titles during the 1980s. It is one of the best-selling manga series in history, with over 100 million copies sold worldwide (over 60 million copies in circulation in Japan). In a poll conducted by TV Asahi in 2005 where it broadcast a popularity poll based on a nationwide survey, the Fist of the North Star anime series ranked 26th in a list of the top 100 anime TV series. In a second poll in 2006 where TV Asahi published a list of the Top 100 favorite anime series, it ranked 89th. In a celebrity version of the poll, the series ranked fifteenth. In November 2014, readers of Da Vinci magazine voted Fist of the North Star as the eighth greatest Weekly Shōnen Jump manga series of all time. On TV Asahi's Manga Sōsenkyo 2021 poll, in which 150,000 people voted for their top 100 manga series, Fist of the North Star ranked 22nd.

=== Impact ===
Fist of the North Star is widely regarded as one of the most influential manga series of all time. Geek.com called it "an epochal, generation-defining work that introduced madcap ultraviolence to the page and inspired tons of other manga artists". Berserk creator Kentaro Miura named Fist of the North Star as the work that had the biggest impact on his own. Vinland Saga author Makoto Yukimura was first inspired to become a manga artist after reading the series as a boy. The city of Hokuto, Hokkaido, collaborated with the series to commemorate its 40th anniversary in 2023 by hosting exhibitions, events, and selling merchandise.

It also had an influence on video games. The name of Famicom Shinken, the irregularly published video game section of Weekly Shōnen Jump from 1985 to 1988, was partly named after Fist of the North Star's Hokuto Shinken. Its writer, Yuji Horii, also had the idea to use a video game rating system based on a famous onomatopoeia from the manga. Technōs Japan game designer Yoshihisa Kishimoto cited Fist of the North Star as an influence on the setting and art style of the beat 'em up game Double Dragon (1987), which takes place in a disaster-ridden city. The manga has also been credited with originating the fatality finishing move concept which later appeared in the Mortal Kombat series of fighting games.

The 1980s animated adaptation was controversial in France, particularly among those who feared anime in general was corrupting French youth. Politician Ségolène Royal was among its most prominent critics, lambasting its alleged recidivist violence in her book Le Ras-le-Bol des Bébés Zappeurs (Fed Up of Baby Channel-Zappers).

The name of the French band Rise of the Northstar is a direct reference to the series.

=== Internet memes ===
In the 2010s, Kenshiro's catchphrase "Omae wa mou shindeiru" ("You are already dead") became one of the most popular anime-based Internet memes. In September 2017, music producer deadman 死人 (Noah Ryan Murphy) released the song "Omae Wa Mou" which references the meme and samples the Japanese song "Tiny Little Adiantum" (2013) from the Touhou Project video game music album Toho Bossa Nova 2. The rapper Lil Boom produced his own version of the song named "Already Dead" three months later. In 2019, "Omae Wa Mou" went viral on TikTok and topped Spotify's Viral 50 chart, before being taken off the chart after being struck with a copyright claim.

== See also ==
- Bruceploitation
- Water Margin
