= Fighting Mania =

2000 arcade game

Fighting Mania: Fist of the North Star
- Japanese cabinet
- Developer: Konami
- Publisher: Konami
- Series: Fist of the North Star
- Release: Fighting Mania/Punch Mania: WW: March 2000; Punch Mania 2: JP: December 2000
- Arcade system: Konami System 573

Fighting Mania: Fist of the North Star, released in Japan as Punch Mania: Hokuto no Ken (パンチマニア 北斗の拳, Panchi Mania Hokuto no Ken), is a boxing game based on the manga series Fist of the North Star released by Konami in 2000 as a coin-operated arcade game.

== Cabinet ==
The arcade cabinet stands about 6'2" tall, 34" wide (when facing the machine), and about 4' deep. The monitor is recessed into the cabinet a fair distance, and in the front of the cabinet are six orange, sturdy punching pads with red LED lights embedded near their hinges. The pads are at rest along the inside walls of the recession of the cabinet, lining the monitor. There are also two black plastic "special gloves" that rest in pockets on the front of the machine, which are normally tied with rope or chain to the arcade cabinet to prevent theft. The player is to wear these gloves while playing (although it is also common practice to play without the gloves, though this can scrape the knuckles).

== Gameplay ==
When an on-screen enemy makes an attack on the player, a punch pad will swing out on its hinge at a smooth pace, and upon reaching full extension at 90 degrees, the LEDs light up red. The pad stays lit for a short time, and then the pad returns inside the cabinet to rest. The player must punch this pad while the LEDs are lit. The strength of the player's punch is irrelevant to the game, and the game warns the player not to punch hard, to prevent the risk of breaking the machine. Only the timing of the punch is important, punches should be delivered at half strength, with exact timing.

Punching a pad when it is fully extended and the LEDs lit results in the attack being blocked, and the opponent receiving damage in the form of a counter-attack. Punching too early or too late results in either blocking the move with no counter-attack, or receiving lessened damage from the attack, also with no counter-attack damage to the opponent. Missing a pad completely (the pad retracting without ever being hit) results in full damage taken by the player. As opponents get more difficult - and particularly when they use their special moves - punches will be thrown and pads will pop out in faster succession and in more chaotic patterns, or special precautions may need to be taken, such as only striking one pad that is lit while other dummy pads pop up, or striking pads in the exact order they deploy.

Like conventional fighting games, the player has a life gauge at the top, and the enemy has a life gauge that must be brought to zero as well. Also both characters have a tech meter, in the form of seven stars remotely resembling the Big Dipper'. As attacks are landed or damage is taken, the stars light up along the super gauge and when full, the game will automatically execute the special move for the player. The game will also instruct the player how to use the particular special move it chose, based on the enemy the player is fighting. The game follows the Fist of the North Star series, as each enemy is not only a character from the series, but the finishing moves the player must use to defeat them are taken from the series as well. The game grades the player's performance based on their remaining life, agility, wisdom (wiz), skills and the use of finishing moves (arts).

At the start of the game, the player must choose their course. Each course consist of a set of opponents within a certain story arc. This serves as a difficulty setting. The first course is a tutorial where Kenshiro's master, Ryuken, will teach the player how to play the game and explain the finer points of timing punches. The subsequent courses involve progressively harder opponents moving toward the right, and are based on specific story arcs in the manga.

=== Playable characters ===
- Kenshiro - the main character from Fist of the North Star, he is the player's character for all paths, except Course 5 and 7.
- Rei - Kenshiro's ally in the series, and the hero for the fifth course. In Rei's quest, the first opponent is Raoh, who ends the battle with a fatal blow. At this point, "the Death Omen Star has fallen over Rei": whatever life is left in the gauge after this battle will be what he starts with against the next opponent, and so on through the course without regaining life after each battle.
- Raoh - in the seventh and final course, the player plays as Raoh, Kenshiro's main adversary in the game. The path follows Raoh's rise to power to become the "King of Fists".

=== Courses and opponents ===
Course	Difficulty	Player	Opponents
"Basics of Hokuto Shinken"	Practice	Kenshiro	Ryuken, Zeed
"Southern Cross"	Easy	Kenshiro	Zeed, Mr. Heart, Shin
"Nanto Roku Seiken"	Medium	Kenshiro	King of Kiba, Rei, Shuh, Souther
"Ken-oh, Conqueror of the Century"	Medium	Kenshiro	Colonel, Devil, Uighur the Warden, Ken-oh
"Nanto Roku Seiken, Star of Justice"	Medium	Rei	Ken-oh, King of Kiba, Amiba, Yuda
"Messiah of the Century Legend"	Hard	Kenshiro	Jagi, Amiba, Toki, Ryuga, Raoh
"Conqueror of the Century Legend"	Hard	Raoh	Toki, Jyuza, Fudoh, Kenshiro

=== Regional differences ===
A few differences exist between Fighting Mania and Punch Mania:

- All the voice acting was dubbed into English. In the Japanese version, some of the voice actors from the original anime series (namely Akira Kamiya, Kaneto Shiozawa, Toshio Furukawa and Kenji Utsumi) returned to reprise their characters, while other characters were voiced by new actors.
- When a character performs a special technique, it will display the name of the technique in Japanese characters. In the overseas version, it will display the name of the technique in romanized Japanese, accompanied by an English translation. The translated name for the Nanto (南斗) style switches between the literal meaning of "South Dipper" and the more stylized choice of "South Star" depending on the technique.
- In the Japanese version, the original theme song from the anime series, Ai o Torimodose will be played in the background during key battles. In the overseas version, it was replaced with new music composed for the game.

== Sequel ==
Punch Mania: Hokuto no Ken 2: Gekitō Shura no Kuni Hen (パンチマニア 北斗の拳２ 激闘 修羅の国編, Panchi Mania Hokuto no Ken Tsū: Gekitō Shura no Kuni Hen; "Clash at the Land of Asura") is a sequel to the original Fighting Mania that was released in December 2000. In addition to containing all seven courses from the original game, the sequel adds five additional paths based on the later portion of the manga (the Hokuto no Ken 2 anime series), including one where the player controls the bounty hunter Ein, as well as a few new game modes. The sequel was distributed in a deluxe two monitor cabinet that allowed two-players to play simultaneously in competitive matches against each other or cooperative against the computer.

=== New courses and opponents ===
Course	Difficulty	Player	Opponents
"The New Hokuto Shinken Legacy"	Easy	Kenshiro	Balona and Bask, Geila, Ein
"The Kenka Kenpō Legacy"	Easy	Ein	Buzori, Bat, Jakoh
"Assault at the Imperial Capital"	Medium	Kenshiro	Solia, Harn Bros., Jakoh, Falco
"The Kingdom of Shura"	Medium	Kenshiro	Aka-shachi, Shura, Alf, Han
"The Legend of the True Messiah"	Hard	Kenshiro	Shie, Shachi, Hyoh, Kaioh

=== New game modes ===
- Clash! Death Star - a single-player mode where the player gets the chance to play any of the 24 possible battles from the previous game and play them in any order.
- Versus Mode - a competitive two-player mode where both players face each other as one of eight possible fighters (Kenshiro, Rei, Raoh, Mr. Heart, Jagi, Ein, han, Falco and Kaioh)
- Tag Team Mode - a cooperative two-player mode where both players fight against a series of computer-controlled adversaries. The available teams consists of Kenshiro and Rei, Bat and Ein, or Kenshiro and Raoh.

== See also ==
- Fist of the North Star
- Sonic Blast Man
