= Hokuto no Ken: Ichigo Aji =

Japanese manga series

- Cover of Hokuto no Ken: Ichigo Aji volume one

北斗の拳 イチゴ味
- Genre: Comedy, parody
- Manga
- Written by: Yūshi Kawata
- Illustrated by: Imōto Yukito
- Published by: Tokuma Shoten
- Magazine: Web Comic Zenyon
- Original run: March 1, 2013 – present
- Volumes: 8
- Anime television series
- Directed by: Mankyū
- Music by: Yasuhiro Misawa
- Studio: Ajiado
- Original network: TV Tokyo, TVO, TV Aichi
- Original run: 6 October 2015 – 22 December 2015
- Episodes: 12

Hokuto no Ken: Ichigo Aji (北斗の拳 イチゴ味; lit. "Fist of the North Star: Strawberry Flavor") is a Japanese comedy manga spoofing the post-apocalyptic action series Fist of the North Star (北斗の拳, Hokuto no Ken). An anime television series adaptation started airing in October 2015.

== Plot ==
The story focuses on Holy Emperor Thouzer's attempts to become friends with Kenshiro.

== Characters ==
Souther
Voiced by: Banjō Ginga
Souther (サウザー, Sauzā) is a villain from the original Fist of the North Star manga. In Hokuto no Ken: Ichigo Aji, however, he is transformed into a fun-loving version of himself who wants to party and be friends with Kenshiro. He is voiced by Banjō Ginga, who played the character in the original anime television series.
Shew
Voiced by: Junichi Suwabe
Shew (シュウ, Shū) was a former underling of Thouzer in the original series who sided against him with Kenshiro.
Rei
Voiced by: Kōsuke Toriumi
In the original series, Rei (レイ) becomes an ally of Kenshiro's after the latter rescues his sister.
Juda
Voiced by: Kishō Taniyama
Shin
Voiced by: Toshiyuki Morikawa
Fudo
Voiced by: Takashi Matsuyama
Kenshiro
Voiced by: Katsuyuki Konishi
Toki
Voiced by: Junichi Suwabe
Raoh
Voiced by: Takashi Matsuyama
Yuria
Voiced by: Yūko Minaguchi
Bat
Voiced by: Daiki Yamashita
Rin
Voiced by: Shouta Aoi

== Backup Stories ==
In addition to the regular gag strips, each collected volume of the manga also feature a dramatic side-story at the end illustrated by Yukito the Elder.

- Heart of Meet (HEART of Meet(ハート・オブ・ミート)) - A side-story focused on Mr. Heart. Published in issue #27 (February 2013) of Comic Zenon. Originally part of a collection of three Hokuto no Ken-themed short stories titled Hokuto no Ken: Gedōden (北斗の拳 外道伝) (Note: Stylized as Fist of North Stars: Legends of Outlaw [sic].) that were published in the same issue, it predated the serialization of Ichigo Aji and does not carry its branding.
- Nanto of Meet (南斗 of Meet(なんと・オブ・ミート)) - A side-story focused on Thouzer. Published in issue #42 (May 2014) of Comic Zenon.
- RedBlue (レッドブルー) - A side-story focused on Huey and Shuren. Published in Web Comic Zenyon on October 24, 2014.
- Scrap Mountain (スクラップ・マウンテン) - A side-story focused on Fudo. Published in issue #56 (July 2015) of Comic Zenon.
- Ultimate Desire (アルティメット・デサイア) - A side-story focused on Juda. Published in issue #64 (March 2016) of Comic Zenon.
- Right on King (ライトオンキング) - A side-story focused on Shin. Published in issue #71 (October 2016) of Comic Zenon.

== Media ==
=== Manga ===
The series is written by Yūshi Kawata and illustrated by Imōto Yukito, based on work by Buronson and Tetsuo Hara. It began publication on Tokuma Shoten's Web Comic Zenyon website in 2013.

The manga had over 1 million copies in print as of June 2015.

==== Volume list ====
The series has been collected into eight tankōbon volumes.

No.	Japanese release date	Japanese ISBN
1	20 September 2013	978-4-19-980165-5
2	20 May 2014	978-4-19-980209-6
3	20 November 2014	978-4-19-980246-1
4	20 June 2015	978-4-19-980273-7

=== Anime ===
An anime television series based on the manga was announced in the fourth tankōbon volume in June 2015. It will be directed by Mankyū, and will begin airing on TV Tokyo, TV Osaka, and TV Aichi on 6 October 2015 as part of a DD Hokuto no Ken 2 Ichigo Aji+ program along with the second DD Fist of the North Star anime television. Crunchyroll simulcast the series.
