= DD Fist of the North Star =

Japanese media franchise

- Cover of the first volume of DD Fist of the North Star, published by Tokuma Shoten on June 20, 2011

DD北斗の拳 (Dī Dī Hokuto no Ken)
- Genre: Comedy, slice of life
- Created by: Buronson; Tetsuo Hara
- Manga
- Written by: Kajio
- Published by: Tokuma Shoten
- Magazine: Monthly Comic Zenon
- Original run: October 25, 2010 – June 25, 2016
- Volumes: 8
- Anime television series
- Directed by: Kaijio
- Written by: Shinya Umemura
- Music by: Kazsin
- Studio: North Star Pictures
- Original network: KTV
- Original run: January 11, 2011 – April 5, 2011
- Episodes: 12
- Anime television series
- Directed by: Akitaro Daichi
- Produced by: Naoki Miya
- Music by: Jun Abe; Seiji Mutō
- Studio: Ajiado
- Licensed by: NA: Sentai Filmworks (2014-12-15) (first season only)
- Original network: TV Tokyo
- Original run: April 2, 2013 – December 22, 2015
- Episodes: 26
- icon

DD Fist of the North Star (Japanese: DD北斗の拳(ディーディーホクトノケン), Hepburn: Dī Dī Hokuto no Ken) is a manga series written and illustrated by Kajio. It is an adaptation of Buronson and Tetsuo Hara's Fist of the North Star in a chibi art style.

== Plot ==
The story takes place in an alternative world in which the nuclear war of 199X (in the original series) never occurred. Thus, Kenshiro, Raoh and Toki find themselves pitted against one another not just for the affection of the beautiful Yuria but also a part-time job at Ryuryuken Convenience Store. However, they must work together if they want to stand a chance against greater competition including the South Star District led by the manipulative Shin who also has a crush on Yuria.

== Characters ==
- Kenshiro: The fourth Hokuto brother.
- Toki: The second Hokuto brother.
- Raoh: The eldest Hokuto brother.

=== Ryuryuken ===
It is a convenience store.

- Bat: A university student working in Ryuryuken.
- Rin: A high school girl, and Ryuken's daughter.
- Ryuken: Ryuryuken owner, and Rin's father.

== Media ==
=== Manga ===
DD Fist of the North Star was first announced in 2008 as an anime to commemorate the 25th anniversary of Buronson and Hara's series. However, it was first made into a manga, which started to be serialized in Monthly Comic Zenon by its first issue on October 25, 2010. Its run was completed on the August issue released on June 25, 2016. The individual chapters were collected into eight tankōbon volumes by Tokuma Shoten; the first was released on June 20, 2011, and the last was released on August 20, 2016.

=== Anime ===
In December, through Zenon's February issue, an anime television series was announced to debut in 2011. A Flash series, it was directed by Kajio himself, and aired on Kansai TV between January 11, and April 5, 2011, lasting 12 episodes. The entire series was released on DVD by TC Entertainment on October 26, 2012.

To celebrate the series's 30th anniversary, a second anime adaptation was announced in January 2013, through Zenon's March issue. Produced by Ajia-do Animation Works under the direction of Akitaro Daichi, 13 episodes were broadcast by TV Tokyo from April 2, to June 25, 2013. Four DVDs collecting the episodes were released between June 28, and September 27, 2013. The anime was streamed by Crunchyroll; the first two episodes were available from June 4, 2013, with three more episodes streamed every week there after. In December 2014, Sentai Filmworks announced the licensing of the series to the North American digital and home media market. Sentai released it on DVD and Blu-Ray on April 14, 2015, and also made it available through the streaming site Hidive, and on iTunes, Microsoft Store and PlayStation Store.

In August 2015, a sequel series was announced through the sixth manga volume. Featuring the same cast and mostly the same staff, the series was broadcast on TV Tokyo as part of a DD Hokuto no Ken 2 Ichigo Aji+ program along with the Hokuto no Ken: Ichigo Aji anime adaptation. The first episode aired on October 6, 2015, and the twelve and last was broadcast on December 22, 2015. It was licensed by Crunchyroll to be exhibited simultaneously with Japanese airing.
