= Fist of the North Star: Ken's Rage 2 =

2012 video game

- European Xbox 360 cover art
- Developer: Omega Force
- Publisher: Tecmo Koei
- Director: Hiroshi Kataoka
- Producer: Hisashi Koinuma
- Designer: Jun Kawahara
- Programmer: Eita Karasawa
- Writers: Junpei Imura; Hiroyuki Numoto
- Composer: Haruki Yamada
- Series: Fist of the North Star; Dynasty Warriors
- Platforms: PlayStation 3, Wii U, Xbox 360
- Release: PlayStation 3, Xbox 360: JP: December 20, 2012; NA: February 5, 2013; EU: February 8, 2013; Wii U: JP: January 31, 2013; WW: February 7, 2013
- Genre: Beat 'em up
- Modes: Single-player, Multiplayer

Fist of the North Star: Ken's Rage 2 (Japanese: 真・北斗無双, Hepburn: Shin Hokuto Musou) is a video game for the PlayStation 3, Xbox 360, and Wii U. It was released in Japan in December 2012 and it was released in North America and Europe in February 2013. Unlike in Japan, the Wii U and PlayStation 3 versions are available exclusively for digital distribution via Nintendo eShop and PlayStation Network in North America and Europe (only Wii U version).

== Gameplay ==
Though the gameplay in Ken's Rage 2 remains similar to its predecessor, the game serves as a departure from Fist of the North Star: Ken's Rage in that it is much more in line with other Dynasty Warriors titles. Enemies come in considerably larger hordes, and movement and combat have been vastly accelerated. The option to jump has been removed (save for certain situations where the game allows it) in favor of a dodging system, something that not all characters could do in the first game. Signature Moves are no longer announced mid-battle in order to keep gameplay flowing at a constant rate, and the various Hyper Moves have been dropped or merged with the characters' movesets.

== Modes ==
=== Legend mode ===
The game's Legend mode is made up of a single, streamlined campaign with multiple playable characters, rather than consisting of several interlocking campaigns with several characters and repeated levels that was present in the original. Even though the game is listed as a sequel, much of the story portrayed in Ken's Rage 2 is that which was featured in the original, only greatly expanded upon. In addition, the game covers all of the chapters that take place after the end of the first game, with the exception of the arcs that featured Raoh's orphaned son, Ryu, and the saga of the succession of Sava kingdom.

=== Dream mode ===
The Dream mode in this game shows the backstories of the myriad of playable characters and provides alternative scenarios for the characters to follow.

== Reception ==
Reviews

Aggregate score
Aggregator	Score
Metacritic	49/100

Review scores
Publication	Score
Eurogamer	5/10
IGN	3.7/10
PlayStation Official Magazine – Australia	5/10
PlayStation Official Magazine – UK	5/10
Play	5.8/10

This game received "mixed or average" reviews according to Metacritic. In Japan, the game sold 116,431 copies on the PlayStation 3 within its first week of release.
