= Fist of the North Star: Ken's Rage =

2010 video game

- European Xbox 360 box art
- Developer: Omega Force
- Publisher: Tecmo Koei (Note: Published by Koei in Japan before Tecmo was absorbed.)
- Director: Naohito Kano
- Producer: Hisashi Koinuma
- Designer: Takahiro Kawai
- Programmer: Tomoyuki Kitamura
- Writers: Junpei Imura; Keisuke Okabayashi; Masahiro Kato; Hiroyuki Numoto
- Composer: Haruki Yamada
- Series: Fist of the North Star; Dynasty Warriors
- Platforms: PlayStation 3, Xbox 360
- Release: JP: March 25, 2010; NA: November 2, 2010; EU: November 5, 2010
- Genre: Beat 'em up
- Modes: Single-player, multiplayer

Fist of the North Star: Ken's Rage, originally released in Japan as Hokuto Musou (北斗無双, Hokuto Musō), is a 3D beat 'em up for the PlayStation 3 and Xbox 360 developed by Omega Force and published by Tecmo Koei. It is a spin-off of the Dynasty Warriors series based on the manga franchise Fist of the North Star by Buronson and Tetsuo Hara. It was first released in Japan on March 25, 2010, and it was released in North America on November 2, 2010 and in Europe on November 5. A sequel, Ken's Rage 2, was announced with a surprise trailer at the Electronic Entertainment Expo in June 2012. New playable characters and story arcs are featured, and the game was released in Japan in December 2012.

== Gameplay ==
The basic controls and mission system are the same as most games in Warriors series. Players can also evade like the characters in the Samurai Warriors series. While a KO count is still present, enemies do not necessarily swarm the players and appear in certain sections within an area. Enemies are killed in a similar manner as the original manga, including the series' unique death cries, blood, and exploding bodies.

- Players can play under three different styles found among characters: the Hokuto, Nanto, or Unique Type.
  - Hokuto style users can pinpoint their opponent's secret pressure points at various times, allowing their character to deal critical damage.
  - Nanto fighters can use a unique technique called Mikiri Kougeki, which allows the characters to see openings in their opponent's attacks. When the player and their opponent simultaneously perform a strong attack, a select button may appear on the screen within that instant. If players successfully press the correct button within the moment it appears, the Nanto fighter will instantly evade the attack and perform a counter. Afterward, for a short time, the Nanto fighter will be in a powered-up state that increases their attack power and replaces some of their standard attacks with more powerful ones.
  - Unique types, like Mamiya and Jagi, rely on a technical perspective and can use weapons for special attacks against their foes. They are made for veteran players who want to use more difficult characters.
- A skill point system similar to recent Warriors titles also appears in the game. The main difference with Ken's Rage is that players need to equip particular skills in order to expand their character's learning curve. As more battles are cleared, players can choose to learn whatever techniques, legendary techniques, and secondary abilities they desire for each character based on their own choices. Skill points are earned by collecting glowing balls, or "karma", found after defeating opponents in the field. They can also be earned by correctly performing a Musou Ranbu, trashing objects for scrolls, completing missions, or by finishing a stage with a sound performance.
- Players can perform an instant guard, or "Just Guard", against an opponent's blows to open opportunities for more combos. It require precise timing to pull off the technique.
- Characters can also grab opponents, climb walls, or pick and throw items. They may also need to destroy objects to clear alternative paths through an area.
- Each character can perform, Touki Kakusei, which momentarily increases the powers of their characters by sacrificing the "Touki" gauge.
- Players can use their character's various techniques from the comic. These deadly techniques (or ougi) act as the character's type of "musou" in this game, allowing limited invincibility and massively damaging a target. When a technique is used, the game will momentarily freeze the action on the field until the move is completed. The nature of implementing a technique varies with each character.
- Characters are allowed to have multiple techniques at once and they can be rotated. There are several new techniques for characters that were made solely for this game.
- Each character has their unique legendary technique, or Shin Denshou Ougi, which can instantly kill crowds of weak opponents if performed correctly.
- Another skill available to each character is the Musou Ranbu, which is a special finishing blow that can only be used against weakened opponents in duels. During the sequence, players will need to input buttons that flash on the screen to pummel their foe with Fist of The North Star flare. The feature is executed in a similar manner as Duels in Dynasty Warriors: Gundam 2, except that players need to input a longer series of button combinations for a successful finish. Causing a mistake lowers the player's health as punishment, though this can be blocked.
- Players can also taunt in the game with their characters. Taunting a foe too many times can make them to become enraged and tougher to defeat; however, taunting causes all nearby enemies to swarm to one location on the field, allowing the player to easily and quickly dispatch them with one well-placed combo or signature move. Taunting does not work on "boss" characters with visible health bars at the bottom of the HUD.
- When a character is damaged, their model may change to reflect the changes in their life gauge. If Kenshiro is wounded by an explosion, for instance, portions of his shirt will be blown away.

== Modes ==
=== Legend mode ===
Similar to modes featured in the Dynasty Warriors: Gundam titles, Legend Mode is the story segment which faithfully follows the original manga. The official mode follows the first half of the series, starting with Kenshiro's beginnings until he faces Raoh for the right of the Hokuto Shinken succession. Kenshiro, Rei, Mamiya, Toki, and Raoh can be played in this mode.

Clearing this mode with Rei also unlocks an alternate "white haired" Rei model for players.

=== Dream mode ===
An original story for the game which lets other characters become playable. The basic outline of the mode has the four Hokuto brothers interacting with the "Nanto army". Each character offers a different perspective or story arc within the mode. Completing character scenarios in this section is needed to unlock more characters for this mode.

Clearing this mode with Kenshiro unlocks an alternate torn clothes version for him at the character select screen.

=== Challenge mode ===
Unlocked once Kenshiro's official mode is cleared, it pits the players against a continuous string of opponents. Players can simultaneously face the four Hokuto candidates, the six Nanto Seiken, and other challenges as the players continue playing. It acts as the game's survival mode.

=== Introduction mode ===
The game's tutorial mode for anyone unfamiliar with the game's system, starting with Kenshiro (Hokuto Type). Includes Rei (Nanto Type) and Mamiya (Unique Type) once the second chapter of Kenshiro's official mode is cleared.

=== Gallery ===
Features renders, music, and movies within the game.

=== Settings ===
Players can arrange the buttons, adjust the sound, or turn off the gauges on the screen. There are three difficulties: easy, normal, or hard. An option to adjust the game's violence level can also be done: "Extreme" keeps the blood and gore while "Mild" turns it off. In the western versions, there's also an option to switch between English or Japanese language voices.

== Development ==
Hokuto Musō was originally announced as a "mystery title" during the 2009 Tokyo Game Show and was publicly unveiled during a staged media event on October 14, 2009 (broadcast live to the Japanese movie site, Nico Nico Douga). Its story and characters are based on the famous Japanese comic and anime Fist of the North Star. Tetsuo Hara and Buronson, the illustrator and writer respectively of the original comic, have expressed their support and enthusiasm for the title.

Hisashi Koinuma, the game's producer said that the staff aim to create a "new realistic feel" for the Fist of the North Star series while still being faithful to the original's roots. During this process, he mentioned his concerns for the characters' body structure, muscles, and other minute details (such as perfecting the model for Raoh's wrinkled forehead). He noted that the official mode for this title carries more action adventure tones than other Warriors titles thus far yet gave his assurance that Warriors fans can easily feel at home in the game's original story mode. He personally spoke his thoughts regarding the game at Yodobashi-Akiba, Biccamera Yurakucho, and Biccamera Ikebukuro on March 22 and March 25. He also played a rock-paper-scissor game for attendants, the winner of the crowd obtaining an original T-shirt signed by the game's voice actors.

=== Downloadable content ===
Upon release of the game, Koei plans for downloadable content for the game, including additional costumes and characters. Players can also gain access to download Kenshiro's original costume from the manga and the anime for 300 yen, originally available for the first print editions.

=== Bundles ===
The game comes in four different variations; a standalone copy of the game, the pre-order version, the First print edition and the treasure box edition. The first print edition comes with the access to download Kenshiro's original costume, the pre-order version comes with the Metal Card Case and the treasure box edition includes the character voice Alarm Clock, an original soundtrack CD and an original story book with strategies and artwork.

=== Promotions ===
Pokka Coffee was performing a collaboration event with Fist of the North Star in which they had specially printed cans on their products. These same drinks were present during the March 3rd Premium play test for Ken's Rage.

On October 21, it was announced that pre-order customers who order their game from GameStop stores would receive the playable character 'Heart' as a bonus, as well as two additional missions.

== Reception ==
Reception

Aggregate score
Aggregator	Score
Metacritic	(PS3) 60/100 (X360) 59/100

Review scores
Publication	Score
Destructoid	8.5/10
Edge	5/10
Eurogamer	6/10
Famitsu	32/40
GamePro	3/5
GameRevolution	B−
GameTrailers	4.4/10
GameZone	5.5/10
IGN	5/10
Joystiq	2/5
Official Xbox Magazine (US)	4/10
The A.V. Club	D

Reviews of the game have been mixed, with an average score of 61.70% for the PlayStation 3 version and 60.54% for the Xbox 360 version at GameRankings. The game currently has a Metacritic score of 60 out of 100 for the PlayStation 3 version and 59 out of 100 for the Xbox 360 version.

The game gained a positive review from Famitsu and was given a score of 32 (9/8/7/8) out of 40. "The game recreates the manga's world pretty well, from the heavy-handed Hokuto moves to the speedier Nanto attacks," one writer said. "It's not all that exciting at first, but things change once you start stringing strong attacks together." Another editor had more serious issues with the game's controls. "The throwing animation is too slow, and you stop for a moment after each strong attack," the reviewer wrote. "Maybe it adds to the effect, but it cuts down on the momentum a bit. The rest of your moves are pretty quick and speedy, too, which makes it seem all the worse."

IGN awarded the game five out of ten and said "There are different stories to play through and plenty to unlock, but it's nothing special." Edge magazine awarded the PlayStation 3 version five out of ten and said "It all adds up to an uneven brawler, a game with the resources and technology to break through the walls of the developer's lineage but one unprepared to fully let go and take a chance." GamesTM awarded the same version seven out of ten. PALGN likewise awarded the same version seven out of ten and said "If you like beat 'em ups, you will appreciate this one, but ultimately Fist of the North Star: Ken's Rage is a love letter to fans of the original series."

However, The A.V. Club gave the Xbox 360 version a D and stated, "No matter who's onscreen, Ken's Rage is clunky, lacks variety, and on the whole feels incredibly dated."

Hokuto Musō sold about half a million copies in Japan.
