= Fist of the North Star (NES video game) =

1987 video game

- North American NES box art
- Developer: Shouei System
- Publishers: JP: Toei Animation; NA: Taxan
- Designer: Kenichi Suzuki
- Composer: Tomohisa Mitsuyasu
- Series: Fist of the North Star
- Platform: NES
- Release: JP: April 17, 1987; NA: April 1989
- Genre: Action
- Mode: Single-player

Fist of the North Star is an action video game produced by Toei Animation and developed by Shouei System for the Nintendo Entertainment System (NES). It was first released in Japan under the title Hokuto no Ken 2 (Japanese: 北斗の拳2) (Note: Subtitled Seikimatsu Kyūseishu Densetsu (世紀末救世主伝説) above the in-game title screen.) on April 17, 1987, being the second Hokuto no Ken video game released for the Family Computer (Famicom) by the anime production company (which briefly entered the video game publishing business after their success with the original Hokuto no Ken game for the Famicom in 1986), while also serving as a tie-in to the Hokuto no Ken 2 anime series which began airing on Fuji TV a few weeks earlier. Taxan published the localized NES version in April 1989, making it one of the earliest Fist of the North Star products released in the U.S. alongside Viz Communications' English adaptation of the manga.

== Gameplay ==
Fist of the North Star is a single-plane beat-'em-up in which the player (as Kenshiro) proceeds through the game by walking from left to right, using his martial arts of Hokuto Shinken (Note: Referred to as "bear fist" in the localized manual) to defeat enemies. Similarly to Kung-Fu Master, jumping is performed by pressing the d-pad upwards instead of having a dedicated button, leaving the A and B buttons solely for attacks. To enter a door, the player must press the d-pad UP while holding A and B simultaneously, which is a requirement to proceed through certain stages. In addition to the regular enemies, the player must also defeat sub-bosses and bosses to proceed in the game. Each boss in the game has a weak point that will result in massive damage if the player strikes it with the proper attack before hitting any other part of the body, along with a greater bonus after the stage is cleared.

At the start of the game Kenshiro will only have basic punches and kicks as his only available attacks, but by killing certain enemies with punches, a power-up in the shape of a star will occasionally appear where the enemy used to be. Picking up these stars will increase Kenshiro's power by up to seven levels (the white stars will raise his level up to four stars, afterward Kenshiro must switch to picking up the black stars to increase his power from five stars and onward), (Note: In the Famicom versions, these power-ups came in the form of the Japanese words abeshi (あべし) and hidebu (ひでぶ), which were the death cries of certain villain characters in the manga.) granting him numerous new abilities such as rapid punches and kicks, the ability to reflect enemy knives and arrows, faster walking speed, and a projectile shooting attack performed by pressing AB simultaneously while standing still (the d-pad must be on neutral). When Kenshiro reaches his maximum power level, he will rip his shirt and vest open, increasing his defenses.

Other power-ups include the flag of the Hokuto Army, which replenishes Kenshiro's life gauge, a silver necklace which grants him more "bomb" units (which is required for Kenshiro's projectile attack) and a gold necklace that grants him temporary invincibility by summoning the power of the ultimate technique Musō Tensei. (Note: Mistranslated as "Gento Karate" in the manual) Kenshiro is given an extra life for every 100,000 points achieved by the player. Shooting power can also be replenished for every 20 thugs killed by the player.

== Plot ==
After the death of Raoh, the Central Imperial Capital, a city ruled by the Tentei, has been in great confusion. Kenshiro returns to assists the now grown Bat and Rin as they lead the Hokuto Army resistance against the Tentei's corrupt imperial forces. As Kenshiro ventures into the Capital, he confronts the Four Generals of Gento and their leader Falco the Gold.

== Development ==
The game was developed during the early stages of the Hokuto no Ken 2 anime's production. (Note: At the time of its release (April 17, 1987), only five of the show's 43 episodes aired on Fuji TV.) As a result, the game only covers the Tentei story arc and ends prematurely with an optional final boss battle against the Nameless Shura. The game features characters from both, the manga and anime. Most notably the game's boss characters, the Four General of Gento, consists of Solia, a character from the manga, Taiga (Note: Spelled Tiger in the localized manual.) and Boltz, the renegade Gento Kōken masters from the anime, and a new character named Bronza, who was created for the game. Bronza substitute Shōki's role in the anime as the General of Red Light and is described as the only martial artist outside the Hokuto Shinken school to have mastered the ultimate technique of Musō Tensei.

The U.S. version was shown at the 1988 Summer Consumer Electronic Show under the title Ken the Great Bear Fist, which is the localized title used by Toei's international sales department. The title was changed to Fist of the North Star for its release in order to tie in with Viz's English adaptation of the manga. The cover artwork for the U.S. version depicts Kenshiro sparring with Toki, (Note: Which is actually reused cel artwork from Episode 70 of the first anime series.) who doesn't appear in the game and never actually appeared in the Hokuto no Ken 2 anime series outside flashbacks (as the character was already deceased by that point of the storyline). The NES version has some slight differences from its Famicom counterpart, which cuts the appearances of side characters at the end of certain stages (such as Bat and Rin at the end of the first stage), as well as the kanji that appear at the top of the screen when Kenshiro defeats a boss after striking its weak point at the start of the battle.
