= Gain =

Gain or GAIN may refer to:

== Electronics and computing ==
- Gain (electronics), a measure of the ability to increase the power or amplitude of a signal
- Gain (antenna), a key performance parameter which combines the antenna's directivity and radiation efficiency
- Gain (laser), the amplification of optical power involved in laser emission
- Gain (projection screens), a measure of brightness
- Information gain (decision tree), in mathematics and computer science
- Gain, the term in adaptive control literature for learning rate, a step size tuning parameter in optimization algorithms

== Biology and health ==
- GAIN domain (G-protein-coupled receptor autoproteolysis-inducing domain)
- Primary and secondary gain, psychological mechanisms that may underlie an illness
- Global Appraisal of Individual Needs, a set of psychological assessment instruments
- Global Alliance for Improved Nutrition, a Swiss non-profit foundation working in the field of malnutrition
- Generating Antibiotic Incentives Now, Title VIII of the United States's Food and Drug Administration Safety and Innovation Act of 2012

== Arts ==
- Gain (singer) (Son Ga-in, Korean: 손가인/孫佳人; born 1987), a South Korean entertainer
- Gain (novel), 1998, by American author Richard Powers, about Clare International and Laura Bodey
- Gain (EP), 2009, by Japanese band Sadie

== Economics and finance ==
- Gain (accounting), an increase in market value relative to purchase price of an asset
- GAIN Capital Holdings, Inc. (founded 1999, acquired 2020), a US-based trading company specializing in foreign exchange (forex)
- Greater Avenues to Independence program, the California implementation of Aid to Families with Dependent Children (AFDC), and a precursor to CalWORKs

== Other uses ==
- Gain (surname), anglicised form of Gayen (Bengali: গায়েন)
- Bob Gain (1929–2016), an American professional football player
- Charles Gain (1923–2018), an American police official
- Peter Gain (born 1976), a British former professional footballer
- Gain (detergent), a Procter & Gamble brand

== See also ==
- Gein (disambiguation)
- Gayn (disambiguation)
- Gane, a name
- Gian, a name
- ; terms unrelated to those mentioned above include:
  - Gainer (disambiguation), names and terms
  - Gain of function (disambiguation), medical terms
  - Gaina (disambiguation), people and more
  - Gainsborough (disambiguation), places, people, and more
  - Gaines (disambiguation), places and people
  - Gainford (disambiguation), places
  - Gainesville (disambiguation), places in the United States
  - Gainneville, a commune in France
  - Gain Glacier, in the Kvinge Peninsula on Antarctica
  - Gain Creek, a river in Canada
  - GainJet, a Greek charter airline
  - GainSpan, a Wi-Fi technology company
  - Gain-field encoding, in neuroscience
  - Gain Ground, a 1988 action arcade video game by Sega
  - Gain-ground, a type of sport
  - Gain line, in rugby union
  - "Gain Clout", a song from Slime Language by YSL Records and Young Thug, 2018
  - Gain stage, in audio engineering
  - Gain scheduling, in control theory
  - Gain graph, a type of mathematical structure
- Fusion energy gain factor
- Weight gain, an increase in human body mass
