= Gainsborough =

Gainsborough or Gainsboro may refer to:

== Places ==
- Gainsborough, Ipswich, Suffolk, England
  - Gainsborough Ward, Ipswich
- Gainsborough, Lincolnshire, a town in England
  - Gainsborough (UK Parliament constituency)
- Gainsborough, Saskatchewan, Canada
- Gainsboro, Roanoke, Virginia
- Gainesboro, Tennessee
- Gainesboro, Virginia

== People ==
- Earl of Gainsborough, a title in the peerage of England and the peerage of the United Kingdom
- Humphrey Gainsborough (1718–1776), English minister and engineer
- Thomas Gainsborough (1727–1788), English painter
- William Gainsborough (died 1307), Bishop of Winchester

== Other ==
- Aerith Gainsborough, a fictional character from Final Fantasy VII
- Gainsborough (crater), on the planet Mercury
- Gainsborough (horse), the 1918 Triple Crown Champion of English Thoroughbred Racing
- HMS Gainsborough, two ships of the Royal Navy
- Gainsborough Pictures, a London-based film studio, active between 1924 and 1951
  - Gainsborough melodramas, a group of films made by the studio
- Gainsborough chair, a type of chair made in 18th century England
- Gainsborough hat, a hat in the style of those in Thomas Gainsborough's paintings
- Gainsboro, a color in the X11 color scheme
- a mullein (plants in the genus Verbascum) cultivar
