= Uzi Katz =

Israeli businessman

Oozi Cats
- עוזי כץ
- Born: Uzi Katz; September 1960 (age 65)
- Occupation: businessman
- Title: CEO of Telit
- Term: 2000–2017
- Spouse: Ruth V.

Oozi Cats (Hebrew: עוזי כץ; born September 1960 as Uzi Katz) is an Israeli businessman and the chief executive officer of Telit until it was discovered he was indicted for property fraud in the United States in the early 1990s and failed to disclose it to the board.

== Biography ==
Katz was born in Haifa, studied Economics and Accounting at Haifa University, dropped out following financial difficulties after his father's death. In the 1980s he emigrated to the USA. In 1992, Katz, an associate, and his wife Ruth were indicted by a Boston district court over allegations of wire fraud relating to mortgage loan, but the couple left the US before the plea hearing.

Katz was the founder and head of Auto Depot Israel from 1995.

Katz co-founded a company named "Dai Telecom" in 2000, which was importing, marketing and selling Mobile phone handsets to Israel. In 2002, "Dai Telecom" acquired a stake in Telit, an Italian company. In the following years, Polar Investments, who owned "Dai Telecom", acquired the majority of Telit shares, merged the two companies and Katz was appointed CEO of the group. In April 2005, Telit completed its IPO on the Alternative Investment Market (AIM) of the London Stock Exchange, and raised $44 million at a company value of $115 million.

As CEO Katz oversaw Telit's growth in the following years, acquiring Motorola's Machine to machine (M2M) business unit in 2011, and Bellwave m2m Co. Ltd, the M2M division of Bellwave Co. Ltd., a South Korean wireless communications developer in 2006.

In August 2017, Share Prophets, a financial blog, and the Italian newspaper Il Fatto Quotidiano had both noticed that Cats and Katz both had wives called Ruth, and had the same birthday.

In August 2017, Cats took "a voluntary leave of absence" from Telit, and resigned a few days later, following allegations that he had misled them about this real identity for 17 years, and was a fugitive from US justice. Following the announcement, shares in Telit, which is listed on London's AIM stock exchange, fell by 35%.
