= Toto!: The Wonderful Adventure =

Japanese manga series

- First tankōbon volume cover

トト! The Wonderful Adventure
- Genre: Adventure; Fantasy
- Manga
- Written by: Yuko Osada
- Published by: Kodansha
- English publisher: NA: Del Rey Manga
- Magazine: Weekly Shōnen Magazine
- Original run: December 8, 2004 – October 12, 2005
- Volumes: 5
- icon

Toto!: The Wonderful Adventure (Japanese: トト! The Wonderful Adventure) is a Japanese manga series written and illustrated by Yuko Osada. It was serialized in Kodansha's shōnen manga magazine Weekly Shōnen Magazine from December 2004 to October 2005, with its chapters collected in five tankōbon volumes. It is the story of a young rambunctious teenage boy named Kakashi exploring his world with his friends. The series was licensed for English release in North America by Del Rey Manga.

== Plot ==
Kakashi is a young islander who dreams of exploring the world beyond his home, a world altered by a great war that occurred 50 years ago. He lives alone in a lighthouse after his father, a renowned world traveler, left and was subsequently presumed dead by many people. The arrival of his father's personal journal inspires Kakashi to follow in his footsteps and embark on his own journey. His determination to leave leads him to stow away aboard a zeppelin.

Unbeknownst to him, the airship is loaded with treasure and is hijacked by a gang of ruthless criminals known as the Man Chicken Family. During the ordeal, Kakashi discovers and befriends a small puppy that possesses latent magical powers. After being discovered by the gang, he surprisingly befriends their leader. Their flight is interrupted when the zeppelin is shot from central continent of Oz by the Nassau Imperial Army.

Crashing in a field, Kakashi and the puppy are met by a teenage girl named Dorothy, who is immediately interested in a puppy and names him ToTo. When confronted by Imperial troops, Dorothy demonstrates formidable prowess by defeating them with her unique tornado-based martial arts. The three agree to travel together to the Emerald City, where Dorothy intends to visit her parents during a break from her studies. Their journey is complicated by various adversaries who seek the strange magical collar that ToTo wears.

Their progress is halted when a Nassau officer, disguised as an elderly man, deceives the trio and seizes ToTo. With his companions in danger and feeling threatened himself, ToTo's full power is unleashed as he transforms into a giant dragon that easily defeats the soldiers. Their adventures continue along the transcontinental railroad line known as the Yellow Brick Road, where they befriend a former Imperial soldier turned performer named Noil, and proceed toward the Emerald City.

== Characters ==
- Kakashi: A teenage boy who embarks on a journey to see the world after inheriting his father's journal.
- ToTo: A small dog previously subjected to experiments with an "artifact" by the Nassau Imperial Army, later found and rescued by Kakashi.
- Dorothy: A student at Kansas Academy known for her her solitude and proficiency in martial arts.
- Noil: A former soldier of the Nassau army who works as a performer despite struggling with stage fright.
- Alice: A gang leader who forms an ally with Kakashi after he and his companions assist in fighting the criminal Rabbit Gang.

== Publication ==
Written and illustrated by Yuko Osada, Toto!: The Wonderful Adventure was serialized in Kodansha's shōnen manga magazine Weekly Shōnen Magazine from December 8, 2004, to October 12, 2005. Kodansha collected its chapters in five tankōbon volumes, released from April 15 to November 17, 2005.

The series was licensed for English release in North America by Del Rey Manga. The five volumes were released from May 15, 2008, to March 2009.

=== Volumes ===
No.	Original release date	Original ISBN	English release date	English ISBN
1	April 15, 2005	978-4-06-363519-5	May 13, 2008	978-0-345-50147-9
2	April 15, 2005	978-4-06-363520-1	July 22, 2008	978-0-345-50555-2
3	July 15, 2005	978-4-06-363558-4	November 25, 2008	978-0-345-50662-7
4	September 16, 2005	978-4-06-363578-2	February 24, 2009	978-0-345-50663-4
5	November 17, 2005	978-4-06-363599-7	May 19, 2009	978-0-345-50664-1

== Reception ==
Deb Aoki of About Entertainment considered the series a classic shōnen adventure, praising its optimistic tone and fast-paced plot. She noted its allusions to The Wizard of Oz serve as a clever tribute rather than a direct retelling, resulting in surprising twists that prevent predictability. Aoki concluded it was a satisfying page-turner for younger audiences.

== See also ==
- Legends of the Dark King, another manga series by Yuko Osada
- Shiori Experience, another manga series by Yuko Osada
