= Shiori Experience =

Japanese manga series

- First tankōbon volume cover

SHIORI EXPERIENCE ～ジミなわたしとヘンなおじさん～ (Shiori Ekusuperiensu Jimi na Watashi to Henna Oji-san)
- Genre: Music
- Manga
- Written by: Yuko Osada; Kazuya Machida
- Published by: Square Enix
- Imprint: Big Gangan Comics
- Magazine: Monthly Big Gangan
- Original run: October 25, 2013 – present
- Volumes: 26
- icon

Shiori Experience: Jimi na Watashi to Hen na Oji-san (Japanese: SHIORI EXPERIENCE ～ジミなわたしとヘンなおじさん～, Hepburn: Shiori Ekusuperiensu Jimi na Watashi to Henna Oji-san; lit. 'Shiori Experience: The Plain Me and the Weird Old Man') is a Japanese manga series written and illustrated by Yuko Osada and Kazuya Machida. It has been serialized in Square Enix's seinen manga magazine Monthly Big Gangan since October 2013.

== Synopsis ==
Shiori Honda is a high school English teacher whose dream of being a guitarist died when her brother fled home, leaving the family with his 20 million yen debt. A decade later, on her 27th birthday, she is haunted by the spirit of Jimi Hendrix, one of the most famous members of the 27 Club. He delivers an ultimatum: become a musical legend in a year, or die. Guided by her ghostly mentor, Shiori must now assemble a band and make her name.

== Publication ==
Written and illustrated by Yuko Osada and Kazuya Machida, Shiori Experience has been serialized in Square Enix's seinen manga magazine Monthly Big Gangan since October 25, 2013. Square Enix has collected its chapters into individual tankōbon volumes. The first two volumes were released on November 27, 2014. As of August 25, 2026, 26 volumes have been released.

=== Volumes ===
| No. | Japanese release date | Japanese ISBN |
|---|---|---|
| 1 | November 27, 2014 | 978-4-7575-4372-0 |
| 2 | November 27, 2014 | 978-4-7575-4371-3 |
| 3 | February 20, 2015 | 978-4-7575-4522-9 |
| 4 | May 25, 2015 | 978-4-7575-4651-6 |
| 5 | October 24, 2015 | 978-4-7575-4776-6 |
| 6 | April 25, 2016 | 978-4-7575-4970-8 |
| 7 | November 25, 2016 | 978-4-7575-5165-7 |
| 8 | February 25, 2017 | 978-4-7575-5261-6 |
| 9 | September 25, 2017 | 978-4-7575-5487-0 |
| 10 | April 25, 2018 | 978-4-7575-5702-4 |
| 11 | August 25, 2018 | 978-4-7575-5826-7 |
| 12 | January 25, 2019 | 978-4-7575-5987-5 |
| 13 | August 24, 2019 | 978-4-7575-6260-8 |
| 14 | January 23, 2020 | 978-4-7575-6483-1 |
| 15 | August 25, 2020 | 978-4-7575-6813-6 |
| 16 | February 25, 2021 | 978-4-7575-7115-0 |
| 17 | August 25, 2021 | 978-4-7575-7436-6 |
| 18 | March 25, 2022 | 978-4-7575-7842-5 |
| 19 | September 24, 2022 | 978-4-7575-8163-0 |
| 20 | March 25, 2023 | 978-4-7575-8487-7 |
| 21 | October 25, 2023 | 978-4-7575-8870-7 |
| 22 | May 25, 2024 | 978-4-7575-9207-0 |
| 23 | December 24, 2024 | 978-4-7575-9587-3 |
| 24 | August 25, 2025 | 978-4-301-00022-8 |
| 25 | February 25, 2026 | 978-4-301-00343-4 |
| 26 | August 25, 2026 | 978-4-301-00722-7 |

== Reception ==
The manga placed fourth in Rakuten Kobo's second E-book Award in the "Long Seller Comic" category in 2024.

== See also ==
- Legends of the Dark King, another manga series by Yuko Osada
- Toto!: The Wonderful Adventure, another manga series by Yuko Osada
