= Undead 13+2 =

Studio album by Sadie
- Released: June 25, 2008
- Genre: Heavy metal
- Length: 61:34
- Label: FACE music

Sadie chronology
The Bullet Storm (2007)	Undead 13+2 (2008)	Master of Romance (2009)

Undead 13+2 is the first studio album released by Japanese rock band Sadie, released on June 25, 2008 in Japan. The songs are re-recordings of old Sadie tracks. Many of the original tracks are only obtainable through resale. The limited edition includes a DVD with Sadie's music videos, with the video for "A Holy Terrors" being recorded exclusively for this release.

== Track listing ==
Disc one

1. "Obstacle Progress" – 2:51
2. "Meisai" (迷彩) – 5:03
3. "Mad-Roid" – 3:48
4. "Confusion" – 3:23
5. "Under the Chaos" – 4:11
6. "Children of Despair" – 3:48
7. "Silent Eve" (サイレントイヴ) – 4:50
8. "Psycho Culture" (サイコカルチャー) – 4:08
9. "Grudge of Sorrow" – 4:08
10. "M.F.P(Malicious Female Pigs)" – 3:34
11. "Mousou hi Gyaku Seiheiki" (妄想被虐性癖) – 4:16
12. "A Holy Terrors" – 4:01
13. "Empty Room" – 4:23
14. "Barking the Enemy" – 3:29
15. "Sayonara no Hate" (サヨナラの果て) – 5:41

Disc two (DVD, Limited edition only)

1. "Meisai" (迷彩)
2. "A Holy Terrors"
3. "Silent Eve" (サイレントイヴ)
4. "Crimson Tear"
