= Legends of the Dark King =

Japanese manga series

- Legends of the Dark King: A Fist of the North Star Story
- Cover of the first volume

天の覇王 北斗の拳ラオウ外伝 (Ten no Haō Hokuto no Ken Raō Gaiden)
- Manga
- Written by: Yuko Osada
- Published by: Shinchosha
- Magazine: Weekly Comic Bunch
- Original run: March 24, 2006 – August 24, 2007
- Volumes: 5
- Anime television series
- Directed by: Masashi Abe
- Produced by: Hisato Usui; Kazuo Ōnuki; Kōta Naka
- Written by: Hiroshi Ōnogi
- Music by: Kazuhiro Ishikawa (Kazsin); Shinya Naito (Kazsin)
- Studio: Satelight
- Licensed by: NA: Sentai Filmworks
- Original network: TVA, Tokyo MX, TVO, Kids Station
- English network: Anime Network
- Original run: October 10, 2008 – December 25, 2008
- Episodes: 13

Legends of the Dark King: A Fist of the North Star Story (Japanese: 天の覇王 北斗の拳 ラオウ外伝, Hepburn: Ten no Haō Hokuto no Ken Raō Gaiden; 'The Conqueror of the Heavens: Fist of the North Star Raoh Side-Story'), commonly romanized as Ten no Haoh or Raoh Gaiden, is a Japanese manga series by Yuko Osada that was serialized in the Weekly Comic Bunch from 2006 to 2007. It is a spinoff of the manga series Fist of the North Star by Buronson and Tetsuo Hara. The story centers on the Fist of the North Star antagonist Raoh and depicts his rise to power as the conqueror of a post-apocalyptic world prior to and during the events of the original work. The story of Legends of the Dark King also incorporates elements introduced in the Fist of the North Star: The Legends of the True Savior movie series, including Raoh's childhood friends of Reina and Souga, who help him establish his army.

The manga was adapted into a 13-episode anime series produced by Satelight and aired on Tokyo MX and other stations in late 2008. The anime has been licensed for North America by Sentai Filmworks and distributed by Section23 Films. The complete series was released on a DVD set on September 15, 2009. The series was re-released with the English dub on DVD and Blu-ray on July 20, 2010.

== Plot ==
A global-scale nuclear war has transformed most of the Earth into a barren ocean-less wasteland, resulting in the downfall of modern civilization and a return to a lawless age of barbarism. The survivors of mankind begin to fight each other over the limited supply of uncontaminated food and water still left in the world. The strong ones begin to band together in gangs and armies, fighting each other over territory, while oppressing the weak. A man named Raoh appears, seeking to establish order in the post-apocalyptic world through his mastery of the martial art of Hokuto Shinken. With the help of his childhood friends Reina and Souga, Raoh takes on the mantle of the "King of Fist", as he gradually extends his reign, recruiting new allies in the process, while fighting against rival warlords who seek to challenge his authority.

== Characters ==
=== Main characters ===
Raoh (ラオウ, Raō)
Voiced by: Takashi Ukaji (Japanese); Andrew Love (English)
The eldest of four adoptive brothers trained in the assassination art of Hokuto Shinken. After Kenshiro, the youngest of his brothers, was chosen over him to be the successor, he follows the path of the conqueror, taking the name of the King of Fists (拳王, Ken'ō) in order to conquer the post-apocalyptic world.
Reina (レイナ)
Voiced by: Mai Nakahara (Japanese); Emily Neves (English)
The female Captain of the King of Fist's Royal Guards, nicknamed Reina of the Twin Blades (双剣のレイナ, Sōtō no Reina). A master swordswoman who uses a style known as the Twin Blades of Sun and Moon (日月双刀, Nichigetsu Sōtō). A childhood friend of Raoh who fled from the Land of Asura to help Raoh build his army. Originally a character from the 2006 animated film Hokuto no Ken - Raō Den Gekitō no Shō.
Souga (ソウガ, Sōga)
Voiced by: Masaya Matsukaze (Japanese); David Matranga (English)
The Strategist of the King of Fist's Army and Reina's elder brother, nicknamed Souga the Fleet-foot (韋駄天のソウガ, Itaden no Sõga). A master of the Mount Song Whirlwind Kick (嵩山旋風脚, Sūzan Senpū Kyaku). In the past, he sacrificed his right leg to help Raoh and Reina escape from Cassandra, which was then replaced by a mechanical prosthetic, increasing the power to his kick. Like Reina, he was originally a character from the 2006 anime film Hokuto no Ken - Raō Den Gekitō no Shō.
Sakuya (サクヤ)
Voiced by: Akiko Kimura (Japanese); Shelley Calene-Black (English)
An anime-only character (though she appears in a brief tie-in comic published before the anime). A mysterious woman with an unknown agenda who joins the King of Fist's Army as their second strategist. She is also the sister of Gaiya and master of Black Mountain Dark Form Fist (黒山陰形拳, Kokuzan Ongyō Ken). After joining Raoh, she becomes an acquaintance of Toki, regularly visiting him in Cassandra to report the progress of Raoh and Kenshiro, with only Reina aware of her actions. At the climax of Thouzer and Raoh's battle, she determines that both are unworthy of being ruler because of Thouzer's lack of love and Raoh's lack of sadness, indicating there is an individual who possesses both traits that's deserving of being ruler.
Black King (黒王号, Kokuō Gō)
A large black stallion who was originally leader of a herd of wild horses at the Valley of the Black King (黒王谷, Kokuō Dani). The King of Fist's Army's initial trek to the valley causes them to lose almost all of their Invasionary Force. When Raoh goes to the valley himself to confront the horses, he stumbles into Black King himself, who is protecting an injured foal from two wild tigers. Raoh euthanize the dying foal so the Black King could fight without intervention. After winning Black King's respect, him and his herd becomes the steeds of the King of Fist's Army.

=== The King of Fist's Army ===
Uighur (ウイグル, Uiguru)
Voiced by: Kenta Miyake (Japanese); Rob Mungle (English)
A convicted ruffian who desires to create a legacy for himself. He is imprisoned at Cassandra by Gion's men, who are unable to tame him after he survives five death sentences. When Raoh arrives to meet him, the two duel in a test of strength, ending in a draw. Afterward, he tells Raoh his ambition of being a legend, which wins him over to his favor and he becomes the new warden of Cassandra. His first order of business as Warden was to procure a "cool" helmet like Raoh's.
Amiba (アミバ)
A member of the King of Fist's Reconnaissance Unit. A former acupuncture specialist who holds a grudge against Toki after being scolded for mistreating one of Toki's patients. He joins the King of Fist's Army and under orders from Usa, he attempts to defeat and capture Toki with his self-made style of the North Snake Needle Fist (北蛇鍼拳, Hokuda Shinken), but ends up being easily defeated by Toki. After Toki is captured, Amiba takes over Toki's identity and begins to kill his patients, tarnishing Toki's reputation in the process. Amiba does not appear in the anime.
Ryuga (リュウガ, Ryūga)
Voiced by: Daisuke Matsubara (Japanese); John Swasey (English)
A man whose fated star is Sirius (天狼星, Tenrōsei), a solitary star which does not belong to any constellation and a master of the Mount Tai Sirus Fist (泰山天狼拳, Taizan Tenrōken). He is also Juza and Yuria's older brother. He decides to join Raoh's army after witnessing his battle with Ryuroh, believing that the only way to achieve order in the world is through force. His other hidden agenda is rescuing his sister Yuria from the man named "King". Unfortunately, he learns from his younger brother, Juza, about her fate. Afterward, he continues to serve Raoh.
Gihan (ギハン)
Voiced by: Makoto Yasumura (Japanese); Corey Hartzog (English)
A member of the King of Fist's Reconnaissance Unit who informs Souga of Kenshiro's progress.
Usa (ウサ)
The vice-strategist of the King of Fist's Army. A toad-like underling with a dubious personality who seems to be disliked by Raoh. He is the one who orders Amiba to capture Toki. Usa does not appear in this anime version, his role as Raoh's second strategist is served by Sakuya instead.
Zaku (ザク)
Barga (バルガ, Baruga)

=== Rival warlords and gangs ===
Thouzer the Holy Emperor (聖帝サウザー, Seitei Sauzā)
Voiced by: Toshihiko Seki (Japanese); Illich Guardiola (English)
The sole successor of the South Star Phoenix Fist (南斗鳳凰拳, Nanto Hōō Ken) and the strongest warrior of the Nanto Seiken school, Thouzer was a childhood rival of Raoh and has since taken the title of Holy Emperor, becoming the only warlord to rival Raoh in terms of power. His body possesses a secret that grants him immunity to Hokuto Shinken's application of vital points.
Juda (ユダ, Yuda)
Voiced by: Kishō Taniyama (Japanese); Blake Shepard (English)
The successor of the South Star Crimson Crane Fist (南斗紅鶴拳, Nanto Kōkaku Ken) and leader of the UD Gang. He shifts his allegiance between Raoh and Thouzer, changing from one side to the other depending on which side benefits him the most at the moment.
Jirai (ジライ)
Voiced by: Tomoyuki Shimura (Japanese); John Swasey (English)
The leader of a biker gang who is killed by Raoh at the beginning of the story.
Goram the Demon King (鬼王ゴラム, Kiō Goramu)
Voiced by: Tetsu Inada (Japanese); Jovan Jackson (English)
A warlord who rules over the northern Kanto region, his lair is known as the Demon Cliff Castle (鬼巖城, Kiganjō). A practitioner of Emei Fist (峨嵋拳, Gabi Ken). After being defeated by Raoh, his castle and his army are taken over by Raoh.
Gion the Wise King (智王ギオン, Chiō Gion)
Voiced by: Yukihiro Misono (Japanese); Greg Ayres (English)
A warlord who leads the King of Fist's army to the Valley of the Black King, where they ended up being trampled to death by a herd of wild horses. After Raoh tames the Black King and his herd, Gion surrenders and becomes a sycophantic servant to the King of Fist. He is initially assigned as the Warden of Cassandra, but is demoted to assistant warden after Uighur takes his place.
Hucker (ハッカ, Hakka) and Lirong (リロン, Riron)
Voiced by: Kenji Nomura (Hucker) and Kazuyuki Okitsu (Lirong) (Japanese); Mark X. Laskowski (Hucker), Corey Hartzog (Lirong) (English)
Two masters of the South Star Swallow Fist (南斗飛燕拳, Nanto Hien Ken) who serve Thouzer's army.
Gaoh (我王, Gaō)
Voiced by: Hideyuki Umezu (Japanese); Chris Hutchison (English)
Mentioned by name only in the manga. In the anime, he is the womanizing ruler of the seemingly impregnable Black Steel Castle (黒鉄城, Kokutetsujō). Sakuya infiltrates the castle by seducing Gaoh and has him assassinated by Reina's sniper arrow.
Habaki (ハバキ)
Voiced by: Jin Horikawa (Japanese); Justin Doran (English)
The Commander of Gaoh's army, he uses the South Star Talon Fist (南斗隼牙拳, Nanto Shūga Ken). Appears only in the anime.
Amon the Dragon Emperor (龍帝アモン, Ryūtei Amon)
Voiced by: Katsuhisa Hōki (Japanese); Todd Waite (English)
Master of the Taiji Dragon Fist (太極龍拳, Taikyoku Ryū Ken) and the founder of Cassandra, a city located in the western Kanto region. In order to defend his city from invading forces, he fortified his entire city with traps. However, the traps were so elaborate that many of Amon's own people, including his own son Xenos (ゼノス, Zenosu), were killed by them. Eventually the Dragon Emperor's Army lost their morale and abandoned Amon, leaving only his younger twin brother and former General, who continued supporting Amon out of pity.
Igor the Lion King (獅子王イゴール, Shishiō Igōru)
Voiced by: Nobuaki Kanemitsu (Japanese); Deke Anderson (English)
A giant beast-like warlord who uses the Mount Hua Lion Roar Fist (華山獅子吼拳, Kazan Shishiku Ken). Igor conspired with the Thunder Emperor's Army in order to invade the King of Fist's fortress with a pincer attack. He is defeated by the combined force of Ryuga and Souga. His skull is later made into a wineglass used by Raoh and his men during the subsequent victory celebration.
Rize the Thunder Emperor (雷帝ライズ, Raitei Raizu)
A masked warlord whose his right arm is equipped with a specialized glove that shoots out electric bolts. He conspired with the Lion King's Army to invade the King of Fist's fortress with a pincer attack, but his entire right army is destroyed by Raoh during the fight. Like Igor, his skull is made into as a wineglass in Raoh's victory celebration.
King (キング, Kingu)
A mysterious martial artist who rules over the city of Southern Cross (サザンクロス, Sazankurosu). His true identity is that of Shin (シン), the successor of the South Star Lone Eagle Fist (南斗孤鷲拳, Nanto Koshū Ken) and the man who defeated Kenshiro and engraved the seven scars on his chest. When Raoh learns that Shin's ambition drove Yuria to suicide, Raoh decides not to pursue battle, letting Kenshiro and Shin to settle matters between themselves.
Club (クラブ, Kurabu)
Voiced by: Takashi Ōhara
One of the four lieutenants of King's Army, he practices the Steel Claw Praying Mantis Fist (鉄の爪蟷螂拳, Tetsu no Tsume Tōrōken). He briefly faces Ryuga, but his life is saved due to Juza's intervention.
Salim the King of Mystery (玄王サリム, Gen-ō Sarimu)
Voiced by: Tsuyoshi Aoki (Japanese); Corey Hartzog (English)
A warlord who is seduced and killed by Isabella.
Dagale (ダガール, Dagāru)
Voiced by: Tōru Furusawa (Japanese); John Gremillion (English)
Juda's aide and the successor of the South Star Lovebird Fist (南斗比翼拳, Nanto Hiyoku Ken), he takes command of the UD Gang and his fortress whenever Juda is absent or hiding. He succeeded in capturing Reina and was close to making her one of Juda's slaves until Raoh broke into the UD Gang's stronghold and scared him. He is further frightened when Raoh reveals that Juda was still in the hideout aware of his actions, resulting in Juda appearing behind him.
Isabella (イザベラ, Isabera)
Voiced by: Ayumi Beppu (Japanese); Maggie Flecknoe (English)
A female assassin who serves Dagale. She is scarred behind the neck during a struggle by Salim and thus is cast out from the UD Gang by Dagale. In the anime, she is imprisoned and tortured, only to escape with Reina's help, but is struck by an arrow on her way out and dies.
Komaku (コマク)
Voiced by: Tadashi Miyazawa (Japanese); Greg Ayres (English)
A diminutive underling of Dagale, who helps him capture Reina; only to be frightened when Raoh crashes through the entrance of their hideout.
Jagi (ジャギ)
The third of the four brothers trained by Master Ryuken. He harbors an intense hatred for Kenshiro, the youngest brother, for disfiguring his face and having obtained the title of successor over him. He confronts Reina and Souga, but decides to hold a truce with them when he realizes they're working for Raoh, his eldest brother. He does not appear in the anime.
Jadum the Iron Emperor (鉄帝ジャダム, Tettei Jadamu)
Voiced by: Taro Yamaguchi (Japanese); George Manley (English)
Mentioned in the manga, but appears only in the anime. A warlord who uses the Stern Iron Fist (厳鉄拳, Gentetsu Ken), which covers his body in steel.
Pluto (冥王, Meiō)
A warlord who takes over Southern Cross and God's Land following the death of Shin and the Golan Colonel respectively. He is later killed by Raoh during the events of Raō Den Gekitō no Shō
Gaiya (ガイヤ)
Voiced by: Masayuki Katō (Japanese); Leraldo Anzaldua (English)
Master of the Black Mountain Dark Form Fist (黒山陰形拳, Kokuzan Ongyō Ken), a style which renders its practitioner invisible. Gaiya has infiltrated Pluto's Army and taken control of his organization from behind-the-scenes, becoming the army's true leader. His style proves to be too strong for both Souga and Ryuga, who end up fatally wounded from Gaiya's technique. He is also the older brother of Sakuya.
Haderu the King of Thorns (棘王ハデル, Kyokuō Haderu)
A villain who appears in a special two-part chapter of the Ten no Haō manga. The one-eyed leader of the Tribe of the Black Rose (黒薔薇一族, Kokubara Ichizoku), he is named and modeled after Haderu, the vocalist of the band Jealkb (who performed the opening theme of the anime version). Haderu's underlings are modeled after the other members of Jealkb as well.

=== Other characters ===
Toki (トキ)
Voiced by: Hiroki Touchi (Japanese); David Wald (English)
Raoh's biological brother and the second of Ryuken's four adopted sons. After becoming terminally ill as a result of exposure to nuclear fallout, he begins living in the Village of Miracles (奇跡の村, Kiseki no Mura), where he spends his remaining days using his knowledge of Hokuto Shinken to heal the sick. When he refuses to fight on Raoh's side, he allows himself to be taken to Cassandra and imprisoned, awaiting for Kenshiro's arrival. Sakuya reports to him concerning Raoh and Kenshiro, while mediating in his prison cell.
Ryuroh (リュウロウ, Ryūrō)
Voiced by: Junichi Suwabe (Japanese); Kalob Martinez (English)
A master of the South Star Seagull Fist (南斗流鴎拳, Nanto Ryūō Ken) who was once reputed as the Wise Leader of the South Star (南斗の智将, Nanto no Jishō), a military strategist who led the Nanto troops to several victories. After the 108 sects of Nanto Seiken broke up and began fighting amongst themselves, Ryuroh decided not to be involved in the conflict, choosing to lead a quiet and peaceful life, becoming Ryuroh of the Forest (森のリュウロウ, Mori no Ryūrō). He tries to convince Raoh to change his ways and use his power as a force of good like Toki and Kenshiro. Raoh sees this as an act of defiance and mortally wounds him, but realizes that he was dying from an illness after their fight. He makes one last plea to Raoh to change his ways before dying; unfortunately, Raoh tells him that he is unable to grant his request.
Juza of the Clouds (雲のジュウザ, Kumo no Jūza)
Voiced by: Keiji Fujiwara (Japanese); Mark X. Laskowski (English)
Ryuga's younger half-brother from a different mother and a free-spirited wanderer who uses a self-styled fist (我流拳, Garyū Ken). He goes to Southern Cross to rescue his younger half-sister Yuria, only to learn that she apparently took her own life while in Shin's captivity. He then meets Ryuga and Reina in a bar near Southern Cross, where he reveals the truth about Yuria's fate and Shin's war against Kenshiro to them. He remains in Southern Cross awaiting the result of the upcoming battle drinking himself silly.
Mamiya (マミヤ)
A female prisoner of Juda who was kidnapped from her home village after her parents were murdered. She helps Reina in escaping from Juda's castle after she is captured by Dagale and Komaku. She does not appear in the anime version, her role in the story being served by Isabella.
Ryuken (リュウケン, Ryūken)
Voiced by: Atsushi Ono
The 63rd Grand Master of Hokuto Shinken, and the adoptive father who raised and trained Raoh, Toki, Jagi, and Kenshiro. After naming Kenshiro as his successor, he attempted to dissuade Raoh from using Hokuto Shinken to fulfill his ambition, but suffered a stroke when he confronted him.
Kenshiro (ケンシロウ, Kenshirō)
The 64th Grand Master of Hokuto Shinken and the youngest of Ryuken's adoptive sons. Also known as the Man with Seven Scars (七つの傷の男, Nanatsu no Kizu no Otoko) He was challenged and defeated by the Nanto Seiken master Shin, who left him for dead and then abducted his fiancee Yuria. Since then, he travels the world to protect the weak from the gangs and warlords threatening their survival, becoming a savior to the common people. Although, he never actually appears in the series, he is mentioned thorough the course of the story by Raoh and other characters. By the end of the anime series, Cassandra has fallen and he succeeds rescuing Toki leaving Raoh pleased; by the end credits, Raoh screams his name as his figure turns towards him.

== Media ==
=== Manga ===
Ten no Haoh was serialized irregularly in Weekly Comic Bunch from issues #231 (March 24, 2006) through #300 (August 24, 2007), lasting a total of 42 chapters (including a two-part epilogue), which were subsequently collected in five tankōbon editions. A two-part special chapter was published in 2008 in the September 12 and 19 issues of Comic Bunch as a tie-in to the anime series.

==== Volumes ====
| Vol. | ISBN | Publication date |
|---|---|---|
| 1 | 4-10-771278-8 | July 9, 2006 |
| 2 | 4-10-771297-4 | October 7, 2006 |
| 3 | 4-10-771307-5 | December 9, 2006 |
| 4 | 4-10-771322-9 | March 9, 2007 |
| 5 | 4-10-771353-9 | September 8, 2007 |

=== Anime ===
The anime version of Ten no Haoh, directed by Masashi Abe, aired in Japan on Tokyo MX and other channels from October to December 2008, lasting 13 episodes. The opening theme is Nageki no Endless (嘆きのエンドレ) performed by jealkb, while the ending theme is Namida no Kawa (ナミダノカワ) by minamuse. The series was licensed for Region 1 by Sentai Filmworks and released on a DVD set on September 15, 2009. Sentai Filmworks re-released Legends of the Dark King with an English dub in 2010. The series was released on Region 2 DVD in six volumes, with the first volume having been released in January 2009.

==== Episodes ====
| No. | Title | Original release date |
|---|---|---|
| 1 | "My Fists are for the Heavens!"; Transliteration: "Waga Kobushi wa Ten no Tame" (Japanese: わが拳は天のため!) | October 2, 2008 |
This takes place in a post-apocalyptic world, full of ruin and chaos. As Raoh encounters a biker gang down an empty road, he easily kills its leader, Jirai, and slaughters most of the other gang members. Raoh meets up with Reina and Souga, who are requested by Goram the Demon King to perform in front of him. However, this was a plan for the three to overthrow this king. Raoh defeats Goram in battle and takes over the castle and its army as the "King of Fist".
| 2 | "Kings Understand Kings!"; Transliteration: "Ō wa Ō o Shiru" (Japanese: 王は王を知る!) | October 9, 2008 |
Raoh has his army rebuild the castle within three days and trains them in combat. He sends his army to fight against the soldiers led by Gion the Wise King to take over the kingdom as a means for transportation. However, as Raoh's invasionary force enters into the nearby valley, they end up being trampled to death by a herd of wild horses, said to be ruled by a stallion deemed the Black King. Raoh, Reina, and Souga go to this valley themselves, where they witness the Black King protecting a dying foal against two wild tigers. The Black King and its herd agree to fight alongside Raoh and his army after they both kill off each tiger. After Gion realizes what happened, he surrenders his kingdom to them.
| 3 | "No Castle Can Stand Against Me!"; Transliteration: "Ware ni Otose nu Shiru Nashi!" (Japanese: われに落とせぬ城なし!) | October 16, 2008 |
A mysterious woman named Sakuya offers to assist Raoh and company take down the impregnable kingdom ruled by Gaoh. Sakuya allows herself to enter the fortress in an attempt to seduce Gaoh, lying about her identity and her acquaintance with Raoh. She has him chase her around his bedroom at night, turning off the lights as they circle around. When Gaoh turns back on one of the lights to see Sakuya again, Reina shoots him in the head from the outside with a crossbow from the outside. As Raoh's army begins to infiltrate Gaoh's fortress, Reina fights Habaki, Gaoh's subordinate. Raoh catapults himself onto the fortress and kills Habaki as dawn approaches. Sakuya joins Raoh's army to serve as the tactician of the group.
| 4 | "These Fists are for Other People!"; Transliteration: "Kono Kobushi, Dare Ga Tame Ni!" (Japanese: この拳、誰がために!) | October 23, 2008 |
Gion, now the warden, tells the group that a captive named Uighur has survived five executions, asking Raoh to settle the matter. However, Raoh releases Uighur from imprisonment and assigns him as the new warden. Raoh, Reina, and Souga travel into the abandoned city of Cassandra and meet an old man. He warns them of the various death traps inside the indomitable castle ruled by Amon the Dragon Emperor. After they easily pass through the obstacles, Amon confronts Raoh, but the latter repels the attacks. As a last resort, Amon activates a switch, causing the castle to start collapsing. During this time, Raoh tells Amon that even his own son was killed by one of the traps inside the castle, showing him a medallion the old man, revealed as his younger brother, had kept since the incident. Raoh, Reina, and Souga struggle to evacuate before the castle falls, while Amon is left alone to die under the rubble.
| 5 | "Rival Siblings!"; Transliteration: "Sōkoku no Kyōdai" (Japanese: 相剋の兄弟!) | October 30, 2008 |
The group wants to recruit Toki, who runs a clinic in a poor village and heals the sick using acupressure, and he just so happens to be Raoh's brother. Reina goes to see Toki personally to convince him to join with Raoh, but Sakuya shows opposition to this, saying that having them together will end up in conflict. After Toki refuses to join, Raoh and Souga arrive with the army. Raoh orders his army to arrest Toki after the latter refuses to battle against the former to prove his strength as a martial artist. Uighur tries to express his duty as warden, using his whip to attack Toki. However, he dodges the whip and disables Uighur from attacking. When Sakuya visits Toki in his cell, she apologizes because she wants to protect Raoh from potentially being injured by Toki if the two brothers were to fight each other.
| 6 | "The Demon Awakens!"; Transliteration: "Oni, Mezameru!" (Japanese: 鬼、目覚める!) | November 6, 2008 |
Raoh is told by Souga to go see Ryuroh, a former military strategist now living a peaceful life at a barren wind farm, in an attempt to recruit him in the army. Ryuroh tells Raoh that he is happy with his new life in the empty forest, though he recalls of how he led his troops, now broken up, to several victories in the past. Ryuroh tries to convince Raoh to change his ways and use his power to bring peace and not to cause warfare. Raoh sees this as an act of defiance and mortally wounds him, but realizes that Ryuroh was dying from an illness after their fight.
| 7 | "The Blue Wolf Tears Across The Earth!"; Transliteration: "Aoki Ōkami, Daichi o Karu!" (Japanese: 蒼き狼、大地を駆る!) | November 13, 2008 |
On his way back, Raoh comes across a man named Ryuga, who promptly engages in a fistfight against him, though Raoh withholds the final blow when he sees that Ryuga had no intention of defeating him. After having witnessed Raoh battling Ryuroh recently, Ryuga, believing that the only way to achieve order in the world is through force, decides to serve Raoh for his cause. Later on, it is reported that two armies are invading the fortress with a pincer attack. Raoh assigns Souga to go with Ryuga and fight off the army ruled by Igor the Lion King. After Ryuga kills the army general, the army surrenders, but he precedes to slaughter them while they bow down in fear. Souga tells Ryuga to stop, but this only creates tension between the two warriors.
| 8 | "Wailing Resounds Through the Darkness!"; Transliteration: "Dōkoku, Yami ni Hibiku!" (Japanese: 慟哭、闇に響く!) | November 20, 2008 |
Souga and Ryuga reconcile their differences and now they have to face Igor themselves. They behead this ruthless lion king and return to the fortress, bringing back his skull made into a wineglass to celebrate their victory. A mysterious martial artist known as King, who has taken over the city of Southern Cross, is said to be preparing to invade the fortress. Raoh sends Reina with Ryuga to investigate upon the matter. Reina and Ryuga reluctantly find a man named Juza of the Clouds, Ryuga's half-brother, in a local bar near the city. He reveals that their sister, Yuria, Raoh's childhood friend, committed suicide after she learned that King had destroyed neighboring villages to buy her love. When Ryuga tells a grieved Raoh about this, he decides to leave it alone for the sake of rule.
| 9 | "A Woman's Battle"; Transliteration: "Onna no Tatakai" (Japanese: 女の戦い) | November 27, 2008 |
Raoh's army take down the army led by Jadum the Iron Emperor, while Reina to investigate the UD Gang hideout in the south. She is ambushed and then captured by Dagale, aide to the leader of the gang. As it seems that Jadum's army is lessening in numbers, Jadum transforms his body into steel and fights Ryuga and Sakuya head on, but he is shortly defeated afterwards. While imprisoned, Reina sees Isabella, a female assassin who served Dagale, being tortured to death after having received a scar on her neck from her last mission. Reina manages to free Isabella and herself and attempt to escape the hideout, but Isabella is momentarily shot with an arrow to her back. Raoh unexpectedly arrives to rescue Reina and confronts Juda, the leader of the gang, but Raoh decides not to kill Juda and continues on his way.
| 10 | "Fists Smashed in Hot Sand!"; Transliteration: "Nessa ni Kudakeru Kobushi!" (Japanese: 熱砂に砕ける拳!) | December 4, 2008 |
Souga and a group of men travel across a desert to a village posing as merchants, as to inspect if an army ruled by Pluto has passed by there. Souga gathers the villagers to interrogate how the flag of Pluto's army ended up in the streets. All of a sudden, a mysterious voice impales Souga in the chest by the now hypnotized villagers, saying that he will now have two months to live. Souga is forced to leave and inform Raoh about this. Raoh and the others go to the village themselves and attack Pluto's army. While there, Ryuga is also struck in the chest by the unknown voice. Raoh looks around and sees that a man named Gaiya was responsible for this, as well as for the fact that he has Pluto's army under his spell. Raoh defeats Gaiya in one blow, causing the army to retreat.
| 11 | "The Holy Emperor Cometh!"; Transliteration: "Seitei, Arawaru!" (Japanese: 聖帝、現る!) | December 11, 2008 |
Sakuya is seen in the presence of Thouzer the Holy Emperor, but she chooses not to work under him anymore. Sakuya, accused of betraying Raoh, is sent to prison under suspicion, though she claims she serves Raoh out of love. As Raoh's army begin their raid toward Thouzer's castle, Raoh encounters Hucker and Lirong but easily kills them. Raoh later holds a meeting with Thouzer, who agrees to back down and let Raoh take the title of the "holy emperor" if he chooses to do so. It is revealed that Sakuya plans to take down the fortress on her own.
| 12 | "The King of Fist's Office is Falling!"; Transliteration: "Ima Otsuru Ken'ō Fu" (Japanese: いま墜つる拳王府!) | December 18, 2008 |
Reina is left to defend the office until Raoh and Souga return. Juda makes an appearance and begins to fight the warriors present in the office. Sakuya is released from prison as is to assist Reina in warding off Juda's army. Sakuya explains to Reina that she never betrayed Raoh, instead she merely predicted what would happen if Raoh went to see Thouzer in the first place. Juda has his army tear down the walls and attack the warriors within the fortress. Raoh manages to make it back to his kingdom and overwhelms Juda with his fists. However, Juda still has a trick up his sleeve, shooting Raoh with a giant howitzer. Fortunately, Raoh is able to destroy the large bullet.
| 13 | "I Walk the Path of the Heavens!"; Transliteration: "Waga Omomuku wa Ten no Michi!" (Japanese: わが赴くは天の道!) | December 25, 2008 |
Thouzer breaks his alliance with Raoh and challenges him to a duel. Both suffer grave injuries from their fearsome attacks, but they still continue to fight. Juda tries to attack Raoh from behind, but luckily Souga and Ryuga catches him. Raoh and Souther go at each other at full force, neither of them giving up. As they both makes the final blow, Sakuya stands in their way and takes both of their hits. As she is dying, she determines that both are unworthy of being ruler because of Souther's lack of love and Raoh's lack of sadness. After she passes away, Thouzer tells Raoh that he will follow Raoh without betrayal this time, but he will fight again if Raoh shows any sign of weakness during his ruling. Later on, Souga report to Raoh and Reina that someone broke into the prison, killing Uighur in battle and releasing Toki from confinement.

=== Novelization ===
A web novelization of Ten no Haoh was published in the Hokuto no Ken DX mobile phone site, lasting six chapters.

=== Video game ===
A video game version of Ten no Haō was released by Interchannel for the PlayStation Portable in Japan on January 22, 2009. It is a cel-shaded 3D fighting game featuring 13 playable fighters from the manga and anime. All the characters are voiced by their voice actors from the anime series, with the exception of Raoh, who is voiced by Rikiya Koyama. Jagi and Amiba, who were omitted in the anime, are voiced by Tsuyoshi Aoki and Kazuyuki Okitsu respectively, while Kenshiro, who was unvoiced in the anime, is voiced by Hideo Ishikawa.

== See also ==
- Shiori Experience, another manga series by Yuko Osada
- Toto!: The Wonderful Adventure, another manga series by Yuko Osada
