= Găina River =

Găina River may refer to the following rivers in Romania:

- Găina, a tributary of the Cârlibaba in Suceava County
- Găina, a tributary of the Priboiasa in Vâlcea County

== See also ==
- Gaina (disambiguation)
