= Gayn =

Gayn may refer to:

- Ghayn, an Arabic letter
- Gayn, a surname:
  - Mark Gayn, American/Canadian journalist

== See also ==
- Gayne
- Gain (disambiguation)
