= Jealkb =

Japanese visual kei rock band

- Origin: Japan
- Genres: Alternative rock; progressive rock
- Years active: 2006–present
- Label: jkb records/Yoshimoto r&c
- Members: Haderu (vocals); Dunch (bass); Elsa (drums); Hideki (violin, cello); Ediee (rhythm guitar); Sapoto (lead guitar)
- Past members: Mofto (keyboards); Chaos (lead guitar)
- Website: Official Website

Jealkb (ジュアルケービー juarukeebii) is a Japanese visual kei rock band made up of seven members, all of them comedians including London Boots Ichi-go Ni-go's Atsushi Tamura.

== History ==
Their debut single Metronome hit number 1 on the indies Oricon chart and sold out the same day. The band's name is a Japanese anagram for "visual kei" (ビージュアルケー biijuarukee).

Dunch is also in the supergroup Karasu, that formed in 2009 with Tatsuro (Mucc), Hiroto (Alice Nine), Mizuki (Sadie) and Kenzo (Ayabie).

== Discography ==
Singles

- Metronome (05/31/2006)
- Koi Kizu (恋傷) (10/25/2006)
- Julia (11/29/2006)
- Kuroi Sabaku (黒い砂漠) (04/11/2007) (Ending theme of Elite Yankee Saburo)
- Chikai (誓い) (11/07/2007)
- Fly (03/12/2008)
- Hana (花) (06/11/2008)
- Nageki no Endless (嘆きのエンドレス) (10/22/2008) (Opening theme of Ten no Haoh)
- Will (08/05/2009)
- Makemagic (01/20/2010) (Theme song for Yu-Gi-Oh! Movie: Super Fusion! Bonds that Transcend Time)
- Super Special Summer (06/30/2010)
- Shoushin Macchiato (傷心マキアート) (10/13/2010)
- Reboot (11/02/2016)
- R.P.S. (11/22/2017)

Albums

- Roses (05/16/2007)
- Noroshi (狼煙) (11/26/2008)
- Invade (02/09/2011)
- Against (09/14/2011)
- V (10/10/2012)
- Jealkb no Kore Kawanakute Inde Live ni Kite Kudasai (ジュアルケービーのコレ買わなくて いーんでライブに来てください) (06/25/2014)
- Identity (07/19/2017)

== TV appearances ==
Jealkb has appeared on Menguo Selection. The band also composed "Nageki no Endless", the opening theme for the anime series Legends of the Dark King.
