= Master of Romance =

Studio album by Sadie
- Released: February 25, 2009
- Recorded: 2008–2009
- Genre: Heavy metal
- Label: Mijinko Records/Face Music

Sadie chronology
| Undead 13+2 (2008) | Master of Romance (2009) | Gain (2009) |

Master of Romance (stylized as MASTER OF ROMANCE) is the second studio album released by visual kei band Sadie. It was released in two editions, a limited edition with a live DVD and a regular edition. The limited edition features the bonus track "Newage Slicer".

== Track listing ==
=== Limited Edition ===
Disc One - CD
| No. | Title | Length |
|---|---|---|
| 1. | "imaginary creatures" | 2:30 |
| 2. | "Ice Romancer" | 4:43 |
| 3. | "Shingan" (心眼; "The Mind's Eye") | 3:44 |
| 4. | "VIRTUAL FAKEMAN" | 4:37 |
| 5. | "Scarlet" | 4:11 |
| 6. | "Ageha no Nakigara" (アゲハの亡骸; "Remains of a Swallowtail Butterfly") | 4:43 |
| 7. | "Crimson Tear" | 4:08 |
| 8. | "Kagerou" (陽炎; "Heat Haze") | 4:10 |
| 9. | "Newage Slicer" | 3:19 |
| 10. | "Parasite scene" | 3:31 |
| 11. | "Grieving the dead soul" | 3:57 |
| 12. | "Swallow Rain" | 4:54 |

Disc Two - Live DVD
| No. | Title | Length |
|---|---|---|
| 1. | "Grieving the dead soul" |
| 2. | "M.F.P" (Acronym for "Malicious Female Pigs") |

=== Regular Edition ===
| No. | Title | Length |
|---|---|---|
| 1. | "imaginary creatures" | 2:30 |
| 2. | "Ice Romancer" | 4:43 |
| 3. | "Shingan" (心眼; "The Mind's Eye") | 3:44 |
| 4. | "VIRTUAL FAKEMAN" | 4:37 |
| 5. | "Scarlet" | 4:11 |
| 6. | "Ageha no Nakigara" (アゲハの亡骸; "Remains of a Swallowtail Butterfly") | 4:43 |
| 7. | "Crimson Tear" | 4:08 |
| 8. | "Kagerou" (陽炎; "Heat Haze") | 4:10 |
| 9. | "Parasite scene" | 3:31 |
| 10. | "Grieving the dead soul" | 3:57 |
| 11. | "Swallow Rain" | 4:54 |
