= Sadie (band) =

Japanese visual kei rock band

Background information
- Origin: Osaka, Japan
- Genres: Heavy metal; alternative metal; metalcore
- Years active: 2005–2015–2023(revival)
- Labels: Face Music, Mijinko Records
- Members: Mao; Tsurugi; Mizuki; Aki; Kei
- Past members: Sora
- Website: https://sadierevival.com/

Sadie (サディ) is a visual kei rock band from Japan, formed in 2005. Sadie is signed to Face Music and Mijinko Records.

== Biography ==
Sadie was founded by Mao, Tsurugi, Aki, Mizuki and Sora in February 2005, and comes from the English word "sad", according to vocalist, Mao. Sora departed in January 2006 for "artistic differences", and in March, Kei joined the band to replace Sora.

Their first live appearance was on March 18, 2005, at Osaka Big Cat, when they were the opening act for D, Fatima, Doremidan, shulla, Kra and others.

On July 27, 2005, Sadie released their first maxi single, "Kokui no Shita no Yokubou to, Kunou no Hate ni Mita Hyakkei no Yuritachi", limited to 2000 copies that quickly sold out.

On December 3, Sadie had their first oneman called "Dekiai ~ As a Sad Matter of Fact ~" in the Osaka Muse Hall in front of 250 people, introducing their new single "Dekiai", which came out a few days later and the single "Oboreru Sakana", exclusive for visitors of their concert.

After Sora left the group in January, Sadie was featured on an Omnibus compilation CD called sawayaka sankumi with the song "Meisai". This CD was limited to 777 copies and came with only 3 tracks, one by Sadie, one by Billy and one by The Pumpkin Head.

In March, shortly after the announcement of their first EP "The Trend Killer", Kei replaced Sora as the group's drummer.

On April 19 and 26, Sadie were guests at Shoji Noriko's internet TV show shigoto mo rock mo hard ga saikou!!.

At Sadie's oneman on May 6, three days after the release of "The Trend Killer", the visitors got the chance to receive the second unofficial single "sayonara no hate".

In the following period, Sadie continued to release new material; two more EPs, two more singles and also two live DVDs.

In June 2008, Sadie's first studio album was released, Undead 13+2. It contained re-recordings of old, unobtainable Sadie songs. A DVD with music videos came with the limited edition. It was also announced that another single will be released in July, named "Grieving the Dead Soul".

In 2009, Sadie went on a three-man tour with heidi. and lynch. In February 2009, Sadie released their 5th and first full-length album Master of Romance; containing 4 songs previous recorded within the following year.

In July, they were invited to AM² Convention at Anaheim, California along with heidi. on July 1–3, 2011.

They covered hide's song "Pink Spider" for the Tribute II -Visual Spirits- tribute album, released on July 3, 2013.

Sadie announced that their indefinite hiatus after their "forever and ever…" live at Zepp Tokyo on September 21.

The announcement was made via a post on the band's official home page. In it, the band expressed that since 2015 is their 10th anniversary, they also consider it as "an opportunity to reconsider their music and their lives". They requested that fans support them in this decision and gave the assurance that they will be working in full force until September.

Their latest single dropped on May 27. Entitled as "Voyage", the release contains 3 versions: Normal, First Press Limited Edition A and First Press Limited Edition B.

Sadie had their last nationwide tour (before their hiatus) called "Never Ending Voyage -We never say good bye-" on June 6, 2015.

In March 2016, Mao and Mizuki revealed their new project dubbed "The THIRTEEN".

In June 2023, Sadie announced their revival with all five members returning. They plan to hold two concerts in 2024 to celebrate. In September 2023, they released a music video featuring a re-recording of their song "Meisai" on Youtube.

== Influence ==
Tsurugi cited Sugizo and Inoran from Luna Sea, Aiji and Jun from Pierrot, Kouichi from Laputa as his main influences. Mao was inspired to be a musician by X Japan.

== Members ==
- Mao (真緒) – vocals
- Mizuki (美月) – lead guitar
  - Also in the supergroup Karasu, that formed in 2009 with Tatsuro (Mucc), Hiroto (Alice Nine), Dunch (Jealkb) and Kenzo (Ayabie).
- Tsurugi (剣) – rhythm guitar
- Aki (亜季) – bass
- Kei (景) – drums

Former members

- Sora (空) – drums (2005–2006)

== Discography ==
=== Albums & EPs ===
- The Trend Killer (May 3, 2006)
- The Suicide Machine (November 22, 2006)
- The Bullet Storm (July 25, 2007)
- Undead 13+2 (June 25, 2008)
- Master of Romance (February 25, 2009)
- Gain (December 30, 2009)
- Singles (April 28, 2010)
- Cold Blood (April 6, 2011)
- Red Line (April 4, 2012)
- The Black Diamonds (October 10, 2012)
- Madrigal de Maria (October 16, 2013)
- Bleach (May 14, 2014)
- "GANGSTA" (September 24, 2014)

=== Singles ===
- "Kokui no Shita no Yokubou to, Kunou no Hate ni Mita Hyakkei no Yuritachi" (黒衣の下の欲望と、苦悩の果てに視た百景の百合達) (July 27, 2005)
- "Dekiai" (溺哀 -dekiai-) (December 14, 2005)
- "Grudge of Sorrow" (August 2, 2006)
- "A Holy Terrors" (March 28, 2007)
- "Crimson Tear" (March 5, 2008)
- "Grieving the Dead Soul" (July 23, 2008)
- "Ice Romancer" (December 17, 2008)
- "Kagerou" (陽炎) (July 15, 2009)
- "Dress" (ドレス) (April 28, 2010)
- "Cry More" (クライモア) (September 29, 2010)
- "Toge" (棘-toge-) (November 3, 2010)
- "Juggernaut" (December 15, 2010)
- "Rosario" (October 12, 2011)
- "Meteor" (July 25, 2012)
- "Soukoku no Tsuya" (March 27, 2013)
- "MADRIGAL de MARIA" (October 16, 2013)
- "Voyage" (May 27, 2015)
- Aku no Hana (September 23, 2026)

=== DVDs ===
- The Suicidal Applicants (April 18, 2007)
- Distract against the Terrors (August 1, 2007)
- Crimson Tear Director's Cut (March 5, 2008)
- 「Grieving the dead soul」at Akasaka Blitz 20081005 (March 18, 2009)
- 『Master of Romance』at Shibuya-AX 20090502 (October 28, 2009)
- 『Dress of Skin』at Shibuya C.C.Lemon Hall (October 6, 2010)
- 『CLIPS-13』Music Clip DVD (July 11, 2012)
- 『forever and ever...』at Zepp Tokyo (December 30, 2015)
- 『THE REVIVAL OF SADNESS』at Toyosu PIT (September 25, 2024)
- Sadie 20th Anniversary Live『Myakuhaku』at Hibiya Open-Air Concert Hall (December 24, 2025)

=== Distributions ===
CDs

- "Oboreru Sakana" (溺れる魚) (December 3, 2005)
- "Sayonara no Hate" (サヨナラの果て) (December 17, 2006)
- "Struggle Against Betrayal" (October 5, 2008)
- "Awaki Gunjou" (Rerecorded) (May 2, 2009)

DVDs

- Grudge of Sorrow DVD (August 13, 2006)
- Distract Against the Terrors - Memorial DVD (April 27, 2007)
- Mousou Higyaku Seiheki (妄想被虐性癖) (November 20, 2007)

=== Compilations ===
- Sawayaka Sankumi (さわやか3組) (January 18, 2006)
  - (With the track "Meisai" (迷彩))
- Shock Edge 2006 (October 10, 2006)
  - (With the track "Sayonara no Hate (サヨナラの果て))
- Tribute to Seikima-II -A Contract with the Devil- (悪魔との契約書) (September 15, 2010)
  - (Covering "Stainless Night")
- 「V-ROCK Disney」 (September 14, 2011)
  - (Covering "This is Halloween")
- 「V-Anime Rocks!」 (August 1, 2012)
  - (Covering "Pegasus Fantasy")
- Tribute II -Visual Spirits- (July 3, 2013)
  - (Covering "Pink Spider")
