= Gainer =

Gainer may refer to:

== Sports moves ==
- Gainer (sports), a backward somersault in acrobatics, diving and some martial arts
- Gainer flash, a gainer combined with a flashkick

== Other uses ==
- Gainer, a term related to fat fetishism
- Gainer (surname), includes a list of people with the name
- Gainer (supplement), a bodybuilding dietary product
- Gainer (racing team), a Japanese racing team
- Gainer the Gopher, mascot of the Saskatchewan Roughriders
- Overman King Gainer, a Japanese anime
