= Gaina =

Gaina may refer to:

- Gaina (name), a Romanian surname
- Kazuya Yuasa (born 1979), professional wrestler also known as Gaina

== See also ==
- Benten Film, a Japanese animation studio formerly known as Gaina
- Găina River (disambiguation)
- Gainas, a Gothic leader
