= Gein =

Gein may refer to:

== People ==
- Ed Gein (1906–1984), American murderer
- Gidget Gein (1969–2008), American musician and artist

== Other uses ==
- Ed Gein (band), a Syracuse grindcore band named after the serial killer
- Gein metro station, also neighbourhood, in Amsterdam-Zuidoost
- Gein, comic book character from Rurouni Kenshin, see list of characters
- Special Intelligence Group (GEIN), a defunct intelligence agency in Peru
