= Telit Cinterion =

Internet of things communications company

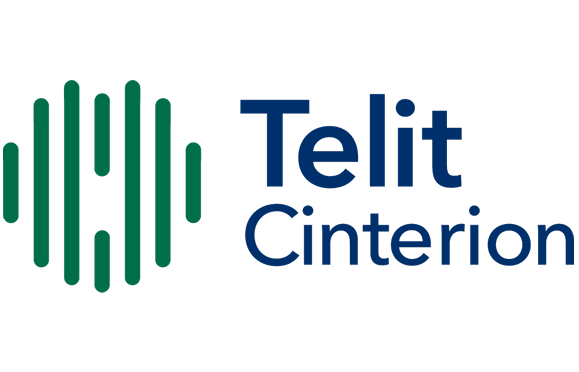
- Type: Private
- Industry: Internet of Things (IoT) and Machine to Machine communications
- Headquarters: Boca Raton, Florida, United States
- Key people: Paolo Dal Pino, CEO
- Products: Telecommunications
- Revenue: $509 Million (2023)
- Number of employees: 1100 (December 2023)
- Website: https://www.telit.com/

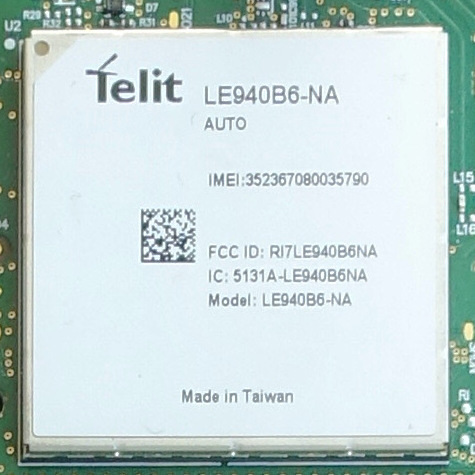
Telit LTE module as used in a Tesla autopilot

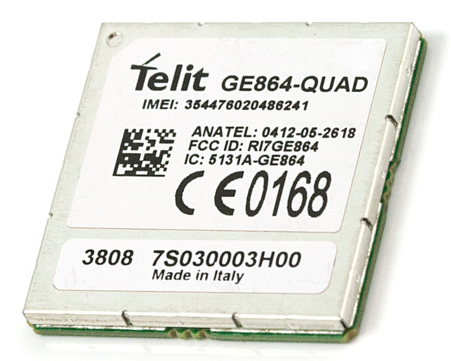
Telit GSM module

Telit Cinterion (known as Telit prior to January 1, 2023) is an Internet of Things (IoT) Enabler company headquartered in Boca Raton, Florida, United States. It is a privately held company with key operations in the US, Brazil, Italy, Israel, and Korea.

== Overview ==
Telit Cinterion is an IoT Enabler providing IoT modules, edge-to-cloud services including connectivity plans, IoT SIMs, IoT embedded software and PaaS IoT deployment managed services. On July 29 2022, Telit and Thales (Euronext Paris: HO), a global leader in Aerospace, Defense, Security & Digital Identity, jointly announced they entered into an agreement under which Telit would acquire Thales' cellular IoT products. The transaction which was concluded on December 31, 2022, included Thales' IoT services platform and portfolio of cellular wireless communication modules, gateways, and data (modem) cards, ranging from 4G LTE, LPWAN to 5G. On August 26 2022, Telit announced the acquisition of group assets from Mobilogix, a California-based startup company specializing in custom IoT solutions worldwide. The acquisition added device engineering expertise and resources that focus on optimizing specifications for handoff to electronic manufacturing services, original device manufacturing, and the attainment of regulatory approvals and carrier certifications. In 2021, the company launched Telit NeXT, a cloud-native core network to enhance its global IoT connectivity offering.

The company developed the ball-grid-array (BGA) module; the “Family” and “Unified-Form-Factor” concepts; the smallest GPS receiver module; a Gigabit LTE data card module; a 5G data card module; simWISE, integrated SIM technology with data subscription services; OneEdge, an IoT deployment management tool; deviceWISE® Industrial IoT Integration and Enablement Platform; Telit IoT Portal, a Cloud-Based Platform as a Service for IoT; and Telit secureWISE, a Secure IIoT Platform for Industrial Systems.

The company also provides cellular, short-range, and global navigation satellite system (GNSS) modules. The products are available in over 80 countries from 20 sales offices, supported regionally from 12 application engineering hubs.

Its module portfolio includes products in GSM/GPRS, EDGE, UMTS, HSPA, LTE (including NB-IoT, LTE-M, Categories 1, 4, 6, 9, 11, 12, 13 Gigabit LTE Category 18), 5G (3GPP Rel 15 and 16) products as well as Wi-Fi, Bluetooth and GPS/GNSS modules. Its module families feature a single form factor that is interchangeable across regional cellular networks, technologies and standards.

== History ==
In 2006, with the acquisition of Bellwave, a regional headquarters was opened in Seoul. In 2008, it further expanded with regional operations in São Paulo, Brazil; Johannesburg, South Africa and Ankara, Turkey.

In 2009 Telit acquired France-based One RF. It also launched Infinita Services to simplify M2M solution deployment and maintenance of device software, and a short-range GSM/GPRS module, the GE865-QUAD.

In March 2011, Telit acquired Motorola Solutions' M2M modules business unit In January 2012 Telit acquired California-based Navman Wireless OEM Solutions.

In July 2012, Telit formed a new business unit, m2mAIR, to offer M2M services. m2mAIR offers module and subscription lifecycle management via a Software as a Service (SaaS) platform and global wireless coverage in partnership with Telefónica. It also includes the Jupiter SL869 multi-constellation GNSS receiver supporting GPS, GLONASS, Galileo and QZSS; followed by the 3D-SiP based SE880.

In 2013, the company acquired Florida-based ILS Technology LLC, a provider of industrial automation and IoT cloud platform. It also acquired Illinois-based CrossBridge Solutions and NXP B.V., NXP’s ATOP business and a fully owned subsidiary of NXP Semiconductors N.V. (Nasdaq: NXPI) adding to the company's company’s OEM automotive products unit. The OEM automotive product business unit was sold in 2019.

In 2017, Telit acquired GainSpan for US$ 8 million.

In 2022, the company announced its acquisition of Thales Cinterion for a 25% stake in Telit. In 2022, the company also announced the acquisition of California-based Mobilogix Inc.

== Research and development (R&D) ==
The company has R&D centers in, Boca Raton - Florida, Trieste - Italy, Seoul - Korea, and Bangalore - India. The Trieste R&D center is complemented with facilities in Cagliari. This center focuses on the advancement of 4G LTE Categories 4, 1, Mobile IoT standards LTE-M and NB-IoT and hardware design for short range wireless and Wi-Fi products. It is also the R&D base for the Telit simWISE integrated SIM (iUICC) product and Telit OneEdge, software suite and tools for IoT deployment management. The facility also houses the company's advanced RF lab.

The Florida center in Boca Raton, houses software engineering and R&D in charge of advancing AI, cloud and platform technologies. It is the lead software development center for Telit Connectivity, Telit simWISE, Telit OneEdge and deviceWISE IoT/Industrial IoT platform. Boca Raton is also the Global Headquarters for Telit's secureWISE platform—the leading remote connection solution for the semiconductor industry.

The R&D center in Seoul (Korea) is the company’s primary APAC hardware R&D center is located in Seoul, South Korea, and is the development site for the cellular broadband products in 5G, and in 4G LTE Categories 1 and above.

The Bangalore (India) software competence hub is for short-range wireless technologies. The Bangalore center develops system and application software for the company's cellular, Wi-Fi and Bluetooth modules.

== See also ==
- Kontron
- Ublox – another manufacturer of wireless modems
