= Global Appraisal of Individual Needs =

- Purpose: respond to the needs of substance abuse treatment

The Global Appraisal of Individual Needs (GAIN) is a family of evidence-based instruments used to assist clinicians with diagnosis, placement, and treatment planning. The GAIN is used with both adolescents and adults in all kinds of treatment programs, including outpatient, intensive outpatient, partial hospitalization, methadone, short-term residential, long-term residential, therapeutic community, and correctional programs.

== History ==
The GAIN was developed to respond to the needs of substance abuse treatment personnel who are faced with the demands of assessing, documenting, treating, and monitoring clients. Researchers, clinicians, policymakers, and behavioral healthcare agencies worked to design assessment tools that could produce methodical data for mapping onto the Diagnostic and Statistical Manual of Mental Disorders (DSMMD) for diagnosis and the American Society of Addiction Medicine (ASAM) Patient Placement Criteria for placement, while following The Joint Commission (TJC) [formerly the Joint Commission on Accreditation of Healthcare Organizations (JCAHO)] for integrating assessments into treatment plans. Since its inception in 1993, application of the GAIN has expanded to thousands of users at agencies across the United States, Canada and several other countries.

== Family of assessments ==
- GAIN Initial (GAIN-I) – a comprehensive standardized assessment that can be used for treatment placement and planning, outcome monitoring, economic analysis, program planning, and supporting motivational interviewing.
- GAIN Monitoring 90 Days (GAIN-M90) – a subset of the GAIN-I used for quarterly follow-up to measure changes in participants throughout their treatment.
- GAIN-Q3 – The GAIN-Q3 includes three separate versions that screen for the recency and frequency of behavior and service utilization in nine areas. Successive versions provide additional information, such as a six-item measure of life satisfaction or supplemental modules to collect information on reasons and readiness to change.
- GAIN Short Screener (GAIN-SS) – a screener, not used for diagnosis or level of care placement, that quickly identifies clients likely to have mental health disorders, issues with crime/violence, and issues with substance use. The GAIN-SS is typically self-administered.

All these assessments can be used to generate reports to aid in diagnosis and treatment planning.

== Content ==
The GAIN-I has sections covering background, substance use, physical health, risk behaviors and disease prevention, mental and emotional health, environment and living situation, legal, and vocational. Within these sections are questions that address problems, services, client attitudes and beliefs, and the client's desire for services. Information on symptoms, which is used for diagnosis, is collected if the behavior has occurred in the last year. Information on behaviors, which is used for treatment monitoring, is collected if the same behavior occurred within the last 90 days. The items are combined into over 100 scales Scale (social sciences) and subscales that can be used for DSM-IV–based diagnoses, ASAM-based level-of-care placement, TJC-based treatment planning, and Drug Outcome Monitoring Study-based outcome monitoring. The GAIN also includes items that support most state and federal reporting requirements, which compare to community samples from the National Survey of Drug Use and Health (NSDUH [formerly the National Household Survey on Drug Abuse (NHSDA)]). As biopsychosocial assessments, The GAIN-I and GAIN-SS provide measures over four main categories of emotional and behavioral health problems—internalizing, externalizing, substance, and crime/violence. Among these categories are numerous scales and indices, which have demonstrated good reliability and internal consistency in studies.

== Response to criticism ==
The GAIN has been criticized for not having scales to assess response style. Critics say these face-valid questions are vulnerable to faked responses from participants. Although it would be impossible for interviewers to ensure that participants always provide genuine responses to questions, the benefit of semi-structured assessments, like the GAIN, is that they allow the interviewer to clarify participant responses. Additionally, helping participants understand how their responses will be used in specific areas of their treatment may encourage them to be truthful. The GAIN-I includes ratings at the end of each section that allow an interviewer to record whether a participant seemed to be doing some estimating, whether they did not understand the questions, whether they were in denial about the severity of a problem or whether they were misrepresenting information. These ratings can be used as flags to communicate problem areas to clinicians and can also assist in treatment planning.
