= Gane =

Gane is both a surname and a given name. Notable people with the name include:

Surname:

- Alan Gane (born 1950), English former amateur footballer and manager
- Chris Gane (born 1974), English professional golfer
- Christopher P. Gane (1938–2019) is a British/American computer scientist
- Constantin Gane (1885–1962), Romanian writer
- Ciryl Gane (born 1990), French mixed martial artist
- Ionel Gane (born 1971), retired Romanian football player
- Jeremy Gane, the managing director of Gane and Marshall International Ltd
- John Gane (1837–1895), British politician
- Lucinda Gane (1949–2005), British actress, played Miss Terri Mooney in the UK TV serial Grange Hill
- Nicolae Gane (1838–1916), Romanian writer and politician
- Tim Gane (born 1964), British musician

Given name:

- Gane Todorovski (1929–2010), Macedonian poet, translator, essayist, literary critic, historian, publicist

== See also ==
- Ali Gane, small town in western-central Senegal
- Gane language, spoken in Indonesia
- Gane Pavilion, temporary building designed by Marcel Breuer and F. R. S. Yorke, built in Bristol, UK
- Henry Gane House, historic house at 121 Adena Road in Newton, Massachusetts
- Mokume-gane, a mixed-metal laminate with distinctive layered patterns
- Ganes (disambiguation)
