= Gain (EP) =

EP by サディ
- Released: 30 December 2009
- Genre: Metal
- Length: 27:18
- Label: MAJESTIC
- Producer: Sadie

サディ chronology
Master of Romance (2009)	Gain (2009)	Singles (2010)

Gain is an EP released by the Japanese band Sadie on 30 December 2009. It was issued in two editions: a regular edition with the bonus track "Regret" and a limited edition with a DVD containing the music video for "Ever" in a slipcase.

== Track listing ==
1. "Ever" – 4:58
2. "Brain Core" – 4:39
3. "Beauty Shadow" – 4:41
4. "Chaotic World" – 3:30
5. "愛しさは孤独の支配者 [Itoshi sa ha Kodoku no Shihai Sha]" — 4:44
6. "Regret" – 4:44

== Personnel ==
- Mao – vocals
- Mizuki – guitar
- Tsurugi – guitar
- Aki – bass guitar
- Kei – drums
