= Gainsborough chair =

Type of upholstered armchair

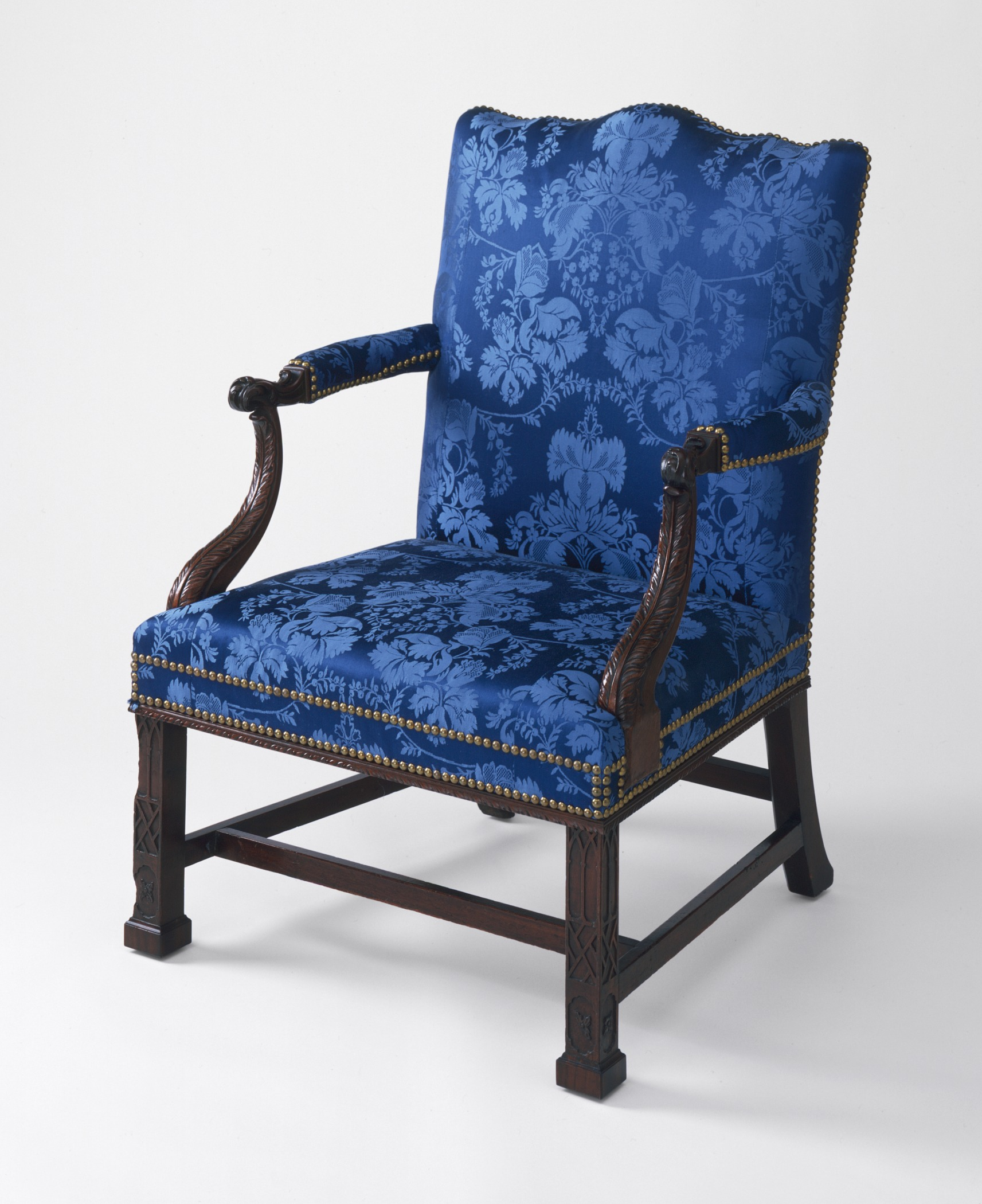
Gainsborough chair

A Gainsborough chair (also known as a Martha Washington chair in the United States) is a type of armchair made in England during the eighteenth century. The chair was wide, with a high back, open sides and short arms, and was normally upholstered in leather.

Contemporaries referred to it as a 'French chair', as the most elaborate styles were based on French Rococo chairs from the Louis XV period.
