= Gainer (surname) =

Gainer is a surname. Notable people with the name include:

- Aaron Gainer, member of American Christian post-grunge band '12 Stones'
- Alice Gainer (born 1982), American television reporter
- Amari Gainer (born 2000), American football player
- Del Gainer (1886–1947), American baseball player
- Derrick Gainer (American football) (born 1966), American football player
- Derrick Gainer (born 1972), American boxer
- Sir Donald Gainer (1891–1966), British ambassador
- Elmer Gainer (1918–1970), American basketball player
- Forrest Gainer (born 1979), Canadian rugby player
- Frank Gainer (1888–1975), Canadian politician
- Glen Gainer Jr. (1927–2009), American politician
- Glen Gainer III (born 1960), American politician
- Jay Gainer (born 1966), American baseball player
- John L. Gainer (born 1938), American chemical engineer
- Ronald William Gainer (born 1947), American Catholic priest, appointed Bishop of Harrisburg in 2014
- Steve Gainer (born 1962), American cinematographer
- Terrance Gainer (born 1947), Sergeant at Arms of the United States Senate 2007–14
