= Gaina (name) =

Gaina is a Romanian surname. Notable people with the surname include:

- Carmen Gaina, geoscientist (Plate reconstruction), Geological Survey of Norway
- Silvestru Gaina, philosopher at the University of Czernowitz
- Valery Gaina (born 1956), rock musician
- Vasile Gaina, theologian, professor, rector of Chernivtsi University

== Găină ==
- Andrei Găină, a Bessarabian politician
