= Gain of function =

Gain of function may refer to:

- Gain-of-function mutations
- Gain-of-function research
