= Gainford =

Gainford may refer to:

- Gainford, Alberta, Canada
- Gainford, County Durham, England

== See also ==
- Gainford Hall
- Baron Gainford
