= HMS Gainsborough =

Two ships of the Royal Navy have borne the name HMS Gainsborough:

- English ship Gainsborough (1653) was a 40-gun ship launched in 1653. She was renamed HMS Swallow in 1660 and rated as a fourth rate. She was wrecked in 1692.
- HMS Gainsborough (1918) was a Hunt-class minesweeper, built as HMS Gorleston, but renamed before being launched in 1918. She was sold in 1928.
