= GainSpan =

- Industry: Semiconductors; Electronics
- Founded: September 2006
- Headquarters: San Jose, California, United States
- Key people: Greg Winner (President and CEO)
- Website: http://www.gainspan.com

GainSpan, a San Jose, California-based semiconductor company, designs and markets ultra-low power Wi-Fi technology. It offers Wi-Fi chips, software, and embedded Wi-Fi modules. The company provides Wi-Fi technology for the residential housing, healthcare, and smart energy industries. It has more than 90 employees primarily working in research and development at its two R&D centers in San Jose, California and Bangalore, India.

== History ==
Engineers from Intel Corporation created GainSpan in September 2006 with the goal of reducing the power consumption of traditional Wi-Fi. GainSpan was the first company to optimize Wi-Fi chips for low power consumption and to apply new power management techniques to target long battery life applications.

Greg Winner was appointed CEO of GainSpan in 2010. In August 2010, GainSpan launched its GS1011M Wi-Fi module that companies can integrate into their products to provide Wi-Fi connectivity.

GainSpan created the GS2000 in 2013. It was the first chip developed to combine both Wi-Fi and ZigBee IP.

In January 2014, GainSpan became the low-power Wi-Fi technology supplier for Solem Electronique's WiFi irrigation controller and Wi-Fi outdoor lighting system.

In January 2015, GainSpan was selected as a partner to integrate its GS2000 modules into Ring's HD video doorbells.

In 2017, GainSpan was acquired by Telit Cinterion for US$ 8 million. Telit took the 60 software and application tech team based in Bangalore as leverage and used them to expand its research and development facilities.
