= Weekly Shōnen Jump =

Japanese manga magazine

- Cover of the first issue of Weekly Shōnen Jump, released in 1968
- Editor-in-Chief: Yū Saitō
- Former editors: Tadashi Nagano; Kazuhiko Torishima; Hisashi Sasaki
- Categories: Shōnen manga
- Frequency: Biweekly (1968–1969); Weekly (1969–present)
- Circulation: 1,035,455; (July–September 2026)
- First issue: July 11, 1968; 58 years ago
- Company: Shueisha
- Country: Japan
- Based in: Tokyo
- Language: Japanese
- Website: Official website

Weekly Shōnen Jump (Japanese: 週刊少年ジャンプ, Hepburn: Shūkan Shōnen Janpu; stylized in English as WEEKLY JUMP) is a weekly shōnen manga anthology published in Japan by Shueisha under the Jump line of magazines. The manga series within the magazine consist of many action scenes and a fair amount of comedy. Chapters of the series that run in Weekly Shōnen Jump are collected and published in tankōbon volumes under the Jump Comics imprint every two to three months. It is one of the longest-running manga magazines, with the first issue being released on July 11, 1968.

The magazine has sold over 7.5 billion copies since 1968, making it the best-selling comic/manga magazine, ahead of competitors such as Weekly Shōnen Magazine and Weekly Shōnen Sunday. The mid-1980s to the mid-1990s represents the era when the magazine's circulation was at its highest, 6.53 million copies per week, with a total readership of 18 million people in Japan. Throughout 2021, it had an average circulation of over 1.3 million copies per week. Many of the best-selling manga series—including One Piece, Dragon Ball, Naruto, Demon Slayer: Kimetsu no Yaiba, Slam Dunk, and KochiKame: Tokyo Beat Cops, all of which are among the top ten best-selling manga of all time—originate from Weekly Shōnen Jump.

Weekly Shōnen Jump has sister magazines such as Jump SQ, V Jump, Saikyō Jump, and digital counterpart Shōnen Jump+ which boasts its own exclusive titles. The magazine has also had several international counterparts, including the North American Weekly Shonen Jump. It also spawned a crossover media franchise including anime and video games (since Famicom Jump) which bring together various Shōnen Jump characters.

== History ==
First issue of Bessatsu Shōnen Jump which replaced Shōnen Book

=== Origins (1960s–1970s) ===
Weekly Shōnen Jump was launched by Shueisha on July 11, 1968, (Note: Cover date August 1.) to compete with the already-successful Weekly Shōnen Magazine and Weekly Shōnen Sunday. Weekly Shōnen Jump's sister publication was a manga magazine called Shōnen Book, which was originally a male version of the short-lived shōjo manga anthology Shōjo Book. Prior to issue 20, Weekly Shōnen Jump was originally called simply Shōnen Jump as it was originally a bi-weekly magazine. In 1969, Shōnen Book ceased publication at which time Shōnen Jump became a weekly magazine and a new monthly magazine called Bessatsu Shōnen Jump was made to take Shōnen Book's place. This magazine was later rebranded as Monthly Shōnen Jump before eventually being discontinued and replaced by Jump SQ.

=== Golden age (1980s–1990s) ===
Hiroki Goto was appointed chief editor in 1986 and remained in the position until 1993. His tenure saw significant increases in circulation, and the serialization of numerous popular series. When asked about the period, Goto stated: "We only tried to create manga that everybody can enjoy. There were no specific rules. Idol and tabloid magazines dominated in the Media & Entertainment industry at that time and we aimed to stand out from the crowd by using only manga as our weapon." Famicom Jump: Hero Retsuden, released in 1988 for the Family Computer was produced to commemorate the magazine's 20th anniversary. It was followed by a sequel: Famicom Jump II: Saikyō no Shichinin in 1991, also for the Family Computer. Shōnen Jump's circulation continued to increase year on year, peaking at 6.53 million copies with the New Year's issue of 1995. (Note: Released as combined issue 3/4 on December 20, 1994.) By 1998, circulation had dropped to 4.15 million copies, a decline in part ascribed to the conclusion of popular manga series Dragon Ball and Slam Dunk. The magazine peaked with a total readership of 18 million people in Japan during the early 1990s.

=== Declining circulation (2000–2013) ===
Circulation for the magazine continued to decline through the early 2000s, before reaching some stability around 2005, well below its earlier peak. In 2000, two more games were created for the purpose of commemorating the magazine's anniversaries. A crossover fighting game titled Jump Super Stars was released for the Nintendo DS in 2005. It was followed by Jump Ultimate Stars in 2006. Due to the 2011 Tōhoku earthquake and tsunami, the shipment of the 15th issue of 2011 was delayed in some areas of Japan. In response, Shueisha published the series included in that issue for free on its website from March 23 to April 27.

On July 11, 2013, the Namco Bandai Group opened an amusement park themed around Weekly Shōnen Jump series. Titled J-World Tokyo, it is located on the third floor of the Sunshine City World Import Mart Building in Ikebukuro and is 1.52 acres. In celebration of the magazine's 45th anniversary in 2013, Shueisha began a contest where anyone can submit manga in three different languages, Japanese, English and Chinese. Judged by the magazine's editorial department, four awards will be given, a grand prize and one for each language, each including 500,000 yen (about US$4,900) and guaranteed publication in either Jump, its special editions, North American edition, China's OK! Comic, or Taiwan's Formosa Youth.

=== Transition to digital (2013–present) ===
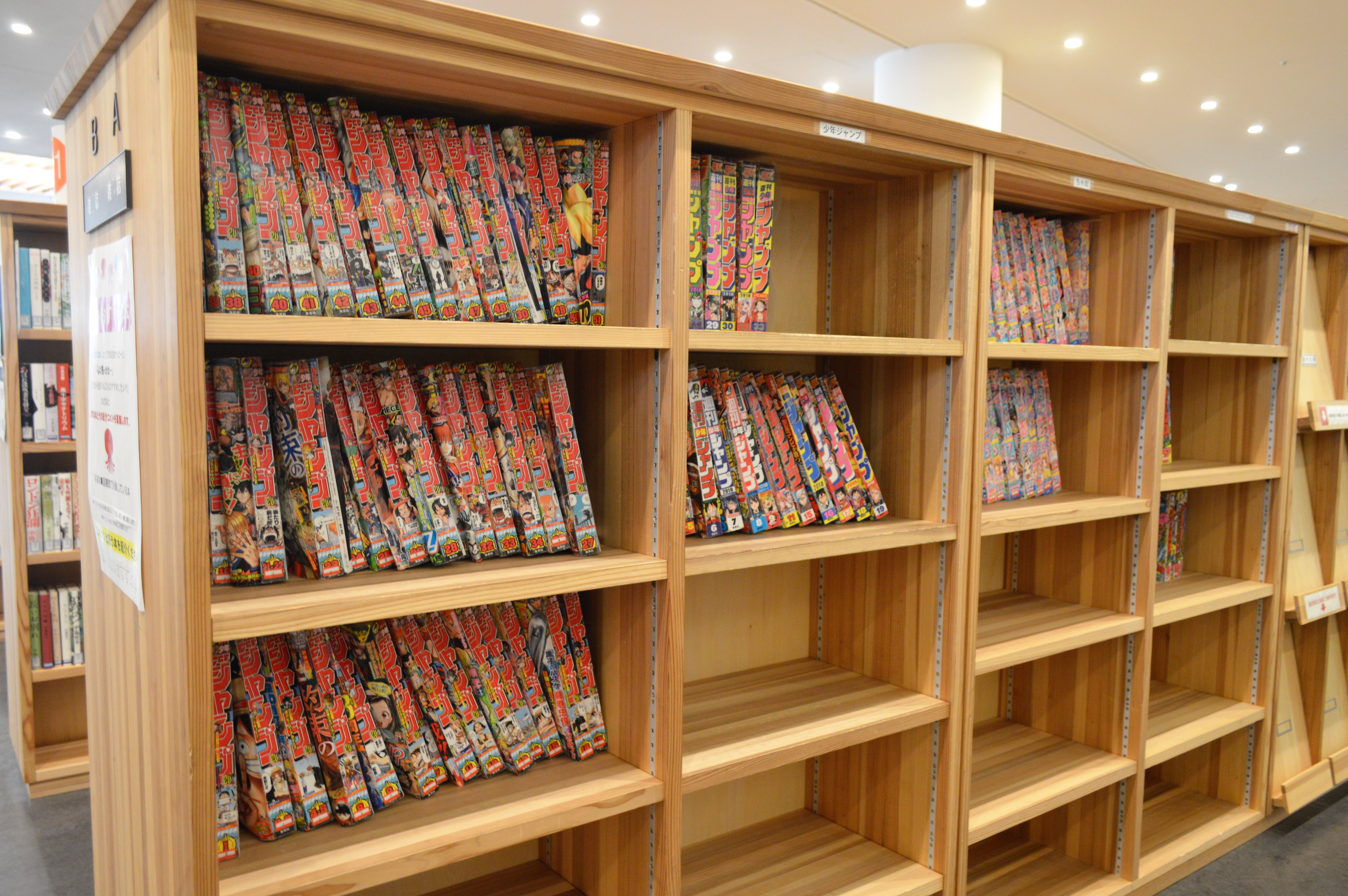
Bookshelves at the Minamiuonuma City Library, featuring issues of Weekly Shōnen Jump (2018)

A mobile phone app titled "Jump Live" was launched in August 2013, it features exclusive content from the artists whose series run in Weekly Shōnen Jump. On September 22, 2014, the free Shōnen Jump+ (少年ジャンプ+, Shōnen Janpu Purasu; abbreviated J+) mobile app and website was launched in Japan. It sells digital versions of the Weekly Shōnen Jump magazine, simultaneous with its print release, and tankōbon volumes of individual Jump series past and present. However, it also has large samples of the manga that can be read for free. There are also series that are serialized exclusively on the app, such as Marvel × Shōnen Jump+ Super Collaboration; unlike those in Weekly Shōnen Jump, these series may be aimed at adult men or women. These exclusive series are later published in print tankōbon volumes under the Jump Comics+ imprint. In 2019, the Shōnen Jump+ website and app had about 2.4 million active users. As of January 2020, the app had been downloaded more than 13 million times.

As the magazine shifted towards digital provision, print circulation once again began to decline. By 2017, print circulation was down to under two million, less than a third of its peak during the golden age. This decline follows similar trends seen by other magazines in the sector.

A new crossover game, J-Stars Victory Vs., was released in 2014 for the PlayStation 3 and PlayStation Vita to commemorate Jump's 45 anniversary. In June 2018, a limited 50th Anniversary Shōnen Jump Edition of the Famicom Mini (NES Classic Edition) game console was released in Japan. It sold 110,000 units in two days.

On January 28, 2019, Shueisha launched the global English-language version of Shōnen Jump+, titled Manga Plus. It is freely available in every country except China and South Korea, which have their own separate services. A Spanish-language version was launched in February 2019, and has a different library of content. Like the Japanese app, it has large samples of manga that can be read for free including all the current titles of Weekly Shōnen Jump, a sizeable number of titles from Shōnen Jump+ and some titles from Jump Square. However, unlike the Japanese version, the latest chapters of current Weekly Shōnen Jump manga are made available free for a limited-time and it does not sell content.

== Newcomer Awards ==
Weekly Shōnen Jump, in association with parent company Shueisha, holds annual competitions for new or up and coming manga artists to create one-shot stories. The best are put to a panel of judges (including manga artists past and present) where the best are given a special award for the best of these new series. The Tezuka Award, named for manga pioneer Osamu Tezuka, is given for all different styles of stories. The Akatsuka Award, named for gag manga pioneer Fujio Akatsuka, is a similar competition for comedy and gag manga. Many Weekly Shōnen Jump manga artists have gotten their start either winning or being acknowledged by these competitions.

== Associated items ==
WSJ is also the center of the Shueisha's branding of its main manga products due to the popularity and recognition of the series and characters published in it. Although the manga are published both in the main magazine as well as in the Jump Comics imprint line of tankōbon, they also are republished in various other editions such as kanzenban and "Remixes" of the original work, usually publishing series older or previously established series. The Jump brand is also used on the tankōbon released of their manga series, related drama CDs, and at "Jump Festa", a festival showing off the people and products behind the Weekly Shōnen Jump manga titles.

== Circulation and demographic ==
Weekly Shōnen Jump is the bestselling manga magazine in Japan. In 1982, Weekly Shōnen Jump had a circulation of 2.55 million. By 1995, circulation numbers swelled to 6.53 million. The magazine's former editor-in-chief Masahiko Ibaraki (2003–2008) stated this was due to the magazine including "hit titles such as Dragon Ball, Slam Dunk, and others." After hitting this peak, the circulation numbers continued to drop. 1998's New Year's issue was the first time in 24 years that Weekly Shōnen Jump lost as the highest selling shōnen manga magazine (4.15 million copies sold), ceding to Weekly Shōnen Magazine (4.45 million). It was not until 2007 that the magazine saw its first increase in 11 years, from 2.75 million to 2.78 million, an increase that Ibaraki credited to One Piece.

By publishing shōnen manga, the magazine is targeted to young teenage males. However, Index Digital reported in 2005 that the favorite non-shōjo magazine of elementary and middle school-aged female readers is Weekly Shōnen Jump at 61.9%. Strengthening it, Oricon conducted a poll among 2,933 female Japanese readers on their favorite manga magazines in 2007. Weekly Shōnen Jump was the number one answer, with One Piece, Death Note, and The Prince of Tennis cited as the reasons. In 2009, it was reported that 62.9% of the magazine's readers were under the age of fourteen. However, in 2019 Shueisha revealed that its largest demographic of 27.4% was aged 25 or older.

== Features ==
=== Series ===
There are currently 22 manga titles present in Weekly Shōnen Jump. Out of them, Burn the Witch's continuation is yet to be scheduled and Hunter × Hunter is published irregularly.

Series title	Author(s)	Premiered	Ref.
Akane-banashi (あかね噺)	Yuki Suenaga, Takamasa Moue	February 2022	
Animal Signal (アニマルシグナル, Animaru Shigunaru)	Robinson Haruhara, Taishi Tsutsui	June 2026	
Burn the Witch	Tite Kubo	August 2020 (Note: Season 1: August–September 2020; Season 2: upcoming)	
Cannon Master (カノンマスター, Kanon Masutā)	Reiya Machida	June 2026	
Class 2-B Hero Destroyerz (2年B組 勇者デストロイヤーず, Ni-nen Bī-gumi Yūsha Desutoroiyāzu)	Hideaki Sorachi	April 2026	
Graykeith: Translator Daemonica (グレイキースの魔界語訳録, Gureikīsu no Makai Goyakuroku)	Natsuki Hokami	September 2026	
Hal Formula	Kento Terasaka	June 2026	
Hunter × Hunter	Yoshihiro Togashi	March 1998 (Note: Only published irregularly from combined issue 4/5, 2023 onwards)	
Ichi the Witch (魔男のイチ, Madan no Ichi)	Osamu Nishi, Shiro Usazaki	September 2024	
Jan Is in Danger! (ジャンがあぶない!, Jan ga Abunai!)	Ryō Nakama	November 2026	
Kagurabachi (カグラバチ)	Takeru Hokazono	September 2023	
Me & Roboco (僕とロボコ, Boku to Roboko)	Shuhei Miyazaki	July 2020	
Nue's Exorcist (鵺の陰陽師, Nue no Onmyōji)	Kōta Kawae	May 2023	
One Piece	Eiichiro Oda	July 1997	
Roku's House of Oddities (ロクのおかしな家, Roku no Okashina Ie)	Atsushi Nakamura	April 2026	
RuriDragon (ルリドラゴン, Ruridoragon)	Masaoki Shindo	June 2022 (Note: Only published in the digital version since April 2024, in parallel with Shōnen Jump+)	
Shinobi Undercover (しのびごと, Shinobigoto)	Ippon Takegushi, Santa Mitarashi	September 2024	
Someone Hertz (さむわんへるつ, Samuwan Herutsu)	Ei Yamano	September 2025	
Ultimate Exorcist Kiyoshi (悪祓士のキヨシくん, Ekusoshisuto no Kiyoshi-kun)	Shōichi Usui	June 2024	
Under Doctor	Kyō Tanimoto	January 2026	
The Ura Files (ウラのレポート, Ura no Repōto)	Shun Numa, Yūshin Kuroki	August 2026	

== Related titles ==
=== Jump Giga ===
Jump Giga (ジャンプGIGA) is a special seasonal offshoot of Weekly Shōnen Jump launched on July 20, 2016. Its original predecessor started in 1969 as a regular special issue of the bi-weekly Shōnen Jump. When Shōnen Jump became a weekly publication and was renamed Weekly Shōnen Jump in October of that same year, the special issue changed to a quarterly release and kept the shorter name. In the mid-1980s, the magazine took on the Weekly Shōnen Jump name with each issue subtitled the Spring, Summer, Autumn, or Winter Special.

Beginning in 1996, it was published three times a year for Golden Week, Obon and New Years under the name Akamaru Jump (赤マルジャンプ, Akamaru Janpu) until April 30, 2010, when it was renamed Shōnen Jump Next! (少年ジャンプNEXT!). Jump Next! has had several other past special versions:

- Aomaru Jump (青マルジャンプ, Aomaru Janpu) was a single issue of Akamaru Jump. One-shots that were featured in Aomaru Jump were Dead/Undead, Shōgai Oyaji Michi!, The Dream, Mieruhito, Yūtō ☆ Hōshi, and Fuku wa Jutsu.
- Jump the Revolution! (ジャンプ the REVOLUTION!) was a special edition of Akamaru Jump that was published in two issues in November 2005 and 2006. Jump the Revolution! contained one-shots of upcoming Weekly Shōnen Jump series and soon to be Jump SQ series.

In 2012 it returned to a quarterly schedule. A second exclamation point was added to the title in March 2014, when it switched to a bi-monthly release. After relaunching as Jump Giga, the magazine published four issues or "volumes" in 2016 and 2017, six in 2018 and 2019 (three in summer and three in winter), and seems to have returned to a seasonal quarterly release since 2020.

Jump Giga features many amateur manga artists who get their one-shots published in the magazine. It also puts additional one-shot titles by professional manga artists, which promote upcoming series to be published in the main magazine. It has also featured the last chapters of cancelled series from Weekly Shōnen Jump, such as Enigma and Magico. It also features yonkoma of popular series such as Death Note and Naruto, as well as the pilot chapter of Bleach. Final epilogue chapters of The Disastrous Life of Saiki K. and Food Wars! Shokugeki no Soma were also featured, while Gintama and Black Clover were transferred to allow for their completion.

=== V Jump ===
V Jump (Vジャンプ, Bui Janpu) was originally an offshoot of the Weekly Shōnen Jump magazine in a special issue called Weekly Shōnen Jump Tokubetsu Henshū Zōkan V Jump (週刊少年ジャンプ特別編集増刊 V JUMP). The special issues lasted from 1992 through 1993. V Jump became its own independent anthology in 1993 for coverage of games, including video and card games, in addition to its own run of manga series.

=== Super Jump ===
Super Jump (スーパージャンプ, Sūpā Janpu) was also originally an offshoot of the Weekly Shōnen Jump magazine in a special issue called Weekly Shōnen Jump Tokubetsu Henshū Zōkan Super Jump (週刊少年ジャンプ特別編集増刊 スーパージャンプ). The magazine was published from 1968 to 1988, when it became a separate anthology for seinen manga.

=== Jump VS ===
Jump VS was a special issue of Weekly Shōnen Jump, published on March 22, 2013. The issue focused on "battle manga" and included 12 one-shots.

== International adaptations ==
Manga titles from Weekly Shōnen Jump are translated into many foreign languages, and some even have their own separate version of the Weekly Shōnen Jump anthology. Weekly Shōnen Jump manga are also published in many other countries where the magazine itself is not published, like the United Kingdom, Argentina, Mexico, Spain, Australia, and South Korea.

=== Shonen Jump ===
Shonen Jump, published in North America by Viz Media, debuted in November 2002, with a January 2003 cover date. Though based on Weekly Shōnen Jump, the English language Shonen Jump is retooled for English readers and the American audience and is published monthly, instead of weekly. It features serialized chapters from seven manga series, and articles on Japanese language and culture, manga, anime, video games, and figurines. In conjunction with the magazine, Viz launched new imprints for releasing media related to the series presented in the magazine, and other shōnen works. This includes two new manga imprints, an anime DVD imprint, a fiction line for releasing light novels, a label for fan and data books, and a label for the release of art books.

Prior to the magazine's launch, Viz launched an extensive marketing campaign to promote the magazine and help it succeed where other manga anthologies in North America have failed. Shueisha purchased an equity interest in Viz to help fund the venture, and Cartoon Network, Suncoast, and Diamond Distributors became promotional partners in the magazine. The first issue required three printings to meet demand, with over 300,000 copies sold. It was awarded the ICv2 "Comic Product of the Year" award in December 2002, and continued to enjoy high sales with a monthly circulation of 215,000 in 2008. Shonen Jump was discontinued in April 2012 in favor of its digital successor, Weekly Shonen Jump. With it ending in an incomplete, but yet almost complete picture spine of the Naruto splash page of "Declaration of War" on the side of each said magazine.

=== Weekly Shonen Jump ===
Weekly Shonen Jump, Viz Media's successor to the monthly print anthology Shonen Jump, was a North American digital shōnen manga anthology published simultaneously with the Japanese editions of Weekly Shōnen Jump, in part to combat the copyright infringement of manga through bootleg scanlation services. It began serialization on January 30, 2012, as Weekly Shonen Jump Alpha with a lineup of six titles and new issues published online two weeks after Japanese release, but within a year had expanded to twelve ongoing series, and on January 21, 2013, it underwent a rebranding and transitioned to simultaneous publication with Japan.

=== Banzai! ===
Banzai! is a German-language version of Weekly Shōnen Jump published by Carlsen Verlag that was published from 2001 through December 2005 before being canceled. In addition to the Weekly Shōnen Jump manga series, the magazine also included original German language manga-influenced comics. The magazine competed as a sister publication to a shōjo anthology called Daisuki. It had a circulation of 140,000 copies.

=== Remen Shaonian Top ===
Cover of volume 187 of Remen Shaonian Top

Rèmén Shàonián Top (熱門少年TOP) is the former weekly Chinese-language version of Weekly Shōnen Jump, published in Taiwan by Da Ran Publishing. In the 1990s Da Ran went bankrupt and the magazine had to cease publication. Rèmén Shàonián Top serialized series such as Yu-Gi-Oh!, Tottemo! Luckyman, Hikaru no Go, and One Piece as well as several other domestic manhua.

=== Formosa Youth ===
Formosa Youth (寶島少年 Báodǎo Shàonián) is the current weekly Chinese version of Weekly Shōnen Jump. Formosa Youth features various series from Weekly Shōnen Jump. The Formosa Youth magazine translates Weekly Shōnen Jump manga up to date. A sister publication of Formosa Youth is Dragon Youth Comic (龍少年 Lóng Shàonián), which specializes in domestic manhua. In 1977, the Tong Li company was created and founded by Fang Wan-Nan which created bootlegs, this ended in 1992. A law in Taiwan restricted the act of bootlegging all manga. During 1992, Tong Li created many manga and manhua magazines, New Youth Bulletin, Youth Comic, Margaret Girl, Dragon Youth Comic, and Formosa Youth. Some series like One Piece and Hikaru no Go were first published in the manga/manhua magazine Rèmén Shàonián Top (熱門少年TOP) by Da Ran Publishing, but when Daran Publishing went bankrupt the series were transferred to Formosa Youth.

=== EX-am ===
EX-am is the Hong Kong version of Weekly Shōnen Jump published by Culturecom Holdings's comic division Culturecom Comics, the largest comic distributors in all of Asia. The magazine published Hunter × Hunter, Captain Tsubasa and Dragon Ball—which holds the highest circulation of manga in Hong Kong, alongside the highest of domestic manhua which would be Chinese Hero: Tales of the Blood Sword.

=== C-Kids ===
C-Kids (ซีคิดส์ See Kít) is the Thai language Weekly Shōnen Jump published by Siam Inter Comics. C-Kids publishes many Weekly Shōnen Jump series such as One Piece, Gintama along with many original manga-influenced comics from the division Cartoon Thai Studio like EXEcutional.

=== Boom ===
Boom (บูม) is another Thai language Weekly Shōnen Jump published by Nation Edutainment. Boom publishes many Weekly Shōnen Jump series such as Naruto, Death Note along with many original manga-influenced comics from Factory Studio like Meed Thii Sib-Sam and Apaimanee Saga.

=== Swedish Shonen Jump ===
In November 2004, Manga Media began publication of a Swedish language version of Weekly Shōnen Jump in Sweden, called Shonen Jump as a sister publication to their existing magazines Manga Mania and Shojo Stars. The magazine included chapters from various popular Weekly Shōnen Jump titles including Bleach, Naruto, Shaman King, and Yu-Gi-Oh! In November 2007, after 37 issues published, Manga Media ceased publication of the magazine. It had a circulation of 30,000 copies.

=== Norwegian Shonen Jump ===
A Norwegian language edition of Weekly Shōnen Jump began publication in Norway in March 2005. Published by Schibsted, the Norwegian edition was a direct translation of Bonnier's Swedish version of the magazine, containing the same series and titles. When Bonnier lost the license for Weekly Shōnen Jump, the Norwegian version also ceased publication, with the last issue released on February 26, 2007. They also created two short lived book imprints: "En Bok Fra Shonen Jump" (a book from Shonen Jump) for profile books and "Dragon Ball Ekstra" (Dragon Ball Extra) a line specifically for manga written by Akira Toriyama. Also a film comic based on the Dragon Ball Z anime was released under the "TV Anime Comic" imprint.

== Imprints ==
Jump Comics is used as an imprint label for publishing manga, most often for collected tankōbon volumes of manga series originally serialized in Weekly Shōnen Jump and other Jump magazines. The imprint is published in the U.S. under the names Shonen Jump and Shonen Jump Advanced. Shōnen Jump Advanced was created for the distribution of manga series considered more mature due to content or themes. Series released under SJA include Eyeshield 21, Ichigo 100%, Pretty Face, I"s, Hunter × Hunter, Bobobo-bo Bo-bobo (first edition) and Death Note.

Weekly Shōnen Jump formerly ran a manga line of aizōban editions called Jump Comics Deluxe. Jump Comics+ is the imprint for all the manga series exclusively digitally released on the app and website Shōnen Jump+ after the chapters of the series get reunited and released in print in tankōbon format. Weekly Shōnen Jump has also run a line of light novels and guidebooks called Jump J-Books. Weekly Shōnen Jump has also run a line bunkobon editions called Shueisha Comic Bunko. A line of large square-bound phone book size issues of early Jump Comics series named Shueisha Jump Remix has also been published.

== Circulation figures ==
=== Magazine circulation ===
The mid-1980s to the mid-1990s represents the era when the magazine's circulation was at its highest, 6.53 million copies per week, with a total readership of 18 million people in Japan. The magazine has sold over 7.5 billion copies since 1968, making it the best-selling comic/manga magazine, ahead of competitors such as Weekly Shōnen Magazine and Weekly Shōnen Sunday. Throughout 2019, it had an average circulation of over 1.6 million copies per week.

Year / Period	Weekly circulation	Magazine sales	Sales revenue (est.)	Issue price
1968	105,000	1,050,000	¥94,500,000	¥90
1969	240,000	6,240,000	¥561,600,000	¥90
1971	1,158,000	60,216,000	¥2,709,720,000	¥90
1974	1,650,000	85,800,000	¥8,580,000,000	¥100
1977	1,880,000	97,760,000	¥14,664,000,000	¥150
1978	2,100,000	109,200,000	¥18,564,000,000	¥170
1979	2,800,000	145,600,000	¥24,752,000,000	¥170
1980	3,045,000	158,340,000	¥26,917,800,000	¥170
1981	3,080,000	160,160,000	¥27,227,200,000	¥170
1982	3,420,000	177,840,000	¥30,232,800,000	¥170
1983	3,710,000	192,920,000	¥34,725,600,000	¥180
1984	3,900,000	202,800,000	¥36,504,000,000	¥180
1985	4,500,000	234,000,000	¥42,120,000,000	¥180
1986	4,355,000	226,460,000	¥40,762,800,000	¥180
1987	4,500,000	234,000,000	¥42,120,000,000	¥180
1988	4,850,000	252,200,000	¥45,396,000,000	¥180
1989	5,000,000	260,000,000	¥46,800,000,000	¥180
1990	5,300,000	275,600,000	¥49,608,000,000	¥180
1991	6,020,000	313,040,000	¥56,347,200,000	¥180
1992	6,180,000	321,360,000	¥61,058,400,000	¥190
1993	6,380,000	331,760,000	¥63,034,400,000	¥190
1994	6,480,000	336,960,000	¥70,761,600,000	¥210
1995	6,530,000	339,560,000	¥71,307,600,000	¥210
1996	5,880,000	305,760,000	¥64,209,600,000	¥210
1997	4,050,000	210,600,000	¥44,226,000,000	¥210
1998	3,600,000	187,200,000	¥39,312,000,000	¥210
1999	3,630,000	188,760,000	¥39,639,600,000	¥210
2000	3,630,000	188,760,000	¥39,639,600,000	¥210
2001	3,400,000	176,800,000	¥37,128,000,000	¥210
2002	3,200,000	166,400,000	¥34,944,000,000	¥210
2003	3,000,000	156,000,000	¥32,760,000,000	¥210
2004	3,000,000	156,000,000	¥32,760,000,000	¥210
2005	2,950,000	153,400,000	¥36,816,000,000	¥240
2006	2,953,750	153,595,000	¥36,862,800,000	¥240
2007	2,778,750	144,495,000	¥34,678,800,000	¥240
January 2008 to September 2008	2,788,334	108,745,026	¥26,098,806,240	¥240
October 2008 to September 2009	2,809,362	146,086,824	¥35,060,837,760	¥240
October 2009 to September 2010	2,876,459	149,575,868	¥35,898,208,320	¥240
October 2010 to September 2011	2,890,000	150,280,000	¥36,067,200,000	¥240
October 2011 to September 2012	2,838,000	147,576,000	¥35,418,240,000	¥240
October 2012 to September 2013	2,812,041	146,226,132	¥36,556,533,000	¥250
October 2013 to September 2014	2,701,042	140,454,184	¥35,113,546,000	¥250
October 2014 to September 2015	2,449,792	127,389,184	¥33,121,187,840	¥260
October 2015 to September 2016	2,220,000	115,440,000	¥30,014,400,000	¥260
October 2016 to September 2017	1,903,542	98,984,184	¥25,735,887,840	¥260
October 2017 to September 2018	1,773,125	92,202,500	¥23,972,650,000	¥260
October 2018 to September 2019	1,670,245	86,852,740	¥22,581,712,400	¥260
October 2019 to September 2020	1,557,706	81,000,725	¥23,490,210,250	¥290
October 2020 to September 2021	1,421,704	73,928,634	¥21,439,303,860	¥290
October 2021 to September 2022	1,312,396	68,244,592	¥19,790,931,680	¥290
1968 to September 2022	3,024,197	7,862,913,352 (Note: Weekly Shōnen Jump magazine sales as of September 2018: Up until February 2018 – Over 7.5 billion; March 2018 – 7,148,332; April–September 2018 – 45,738,329; October 2018 to September 2019 – 86,852,740)	¥1,728,185,275,190 ($19.995 billion)	¥218

=== Manga series ===
The following table lists the manga series that have had the highest circulation in Shōnen Jump magazine. It lists the number of issues where they're serialized, and estimated circulation figures and sales revenue of those Shōnen Jump issues (based on the magazine circulation figures above). Of the series listed below, only Bleach, Gintama and Black Clover began their serialization after the conclusion of the golden age in the late 1990s.

Manga series	First Issue	Final Issue	Issues	Weekly circulation (est.)	Total circulation (est.)	Sales revenue (est.)
KochiKame: Tokyo Beat Cops	#42, 1976	#42, 2016	1,960	3,117,207	6,109,725,720	¥1,264,713,224,040 ($15.447 billion)
JoJo's Bizarre Adventure	#1–2, 1987	#19, 2003	752	4,801,765	3,610,927,280	¥713,117,176,736 ($8.937 billion)
One Piece	#34, 1997	present	1040	3,332,759	3,175,460,142	¥765,039,111,480 ($8.627 billion)
Dragon Ball	#51, 1984	#25, 1995	519	5,696,397	2,956,430,000	¥553,694,900,000 ($6.939 billion)
Naruto	#43, 1999	#50, 2014	700	3,284,492	2,299,144,444	¥545,946,848,920 ($6.529 billion)
Bleach	#36–37, 2001	#38, 2016	698	3,127,815	2,183,214,876	¥533,008,161,240 ($6.168 billion)
Dragon Quest	#45, 1989	#52, 1996	349	5,971,250	2,083,966,250	¥395,953,587,500 ($4.962 billion)
Gin Tama	#2, 2004	#42, 2018	704	2,825,175	1,988,923,401	¥513,733,058,820 ($5.546 billion)
Slam Dunk	#42, 1990	#27, 1996	276	6,110,000	1,686,360,000	¥330,841,200,000 ($4.146 billion)
Kinnikuman	#22, 1979	#21, 1987	387	3,963,359	1,533,820,000	¥270,256,200,000 ($3.387 billion)
Rurouni Kenshin	#19, 1994	#43, 1999	255	5,566,784	1,419,530,000	¥298,101,300,000 ($3.736 billion)
Yu-Gi-Oh!	#42, 1996	#15, 2004	343	4,035,569	1,384,200,000	¥290,682,000,000 ($3.643 billion)
Hunter × Hunter	#14, 1998	present	390	2,895,187	1,129,122,930	¥261,372,714,104 ($3.841 billion)
Fist of the North Star	#41, 1983	#35, 1988	245	4,536,857	1,111,530,000	¥200,075,400,000 ($2.508 billion)
City Hunter	#13, 1985	#50, 1991	193	4,940,743	953,563,399	¥171,641,411,820 ($2.151 billion)
Black Clover	#12, 2015	#38, 2023	368	1,794,449	628,057,150	¥163,294,859,000($2.047 billion)
Captain Tsubasa	#18, 1981	#37–38, 1997	178	4,649,038	827,528,750	¥159,040,125,000 ($1.993 billion)
Saint Seiya	#1, 1986	#49, 1990	110	4,801,000	528,110,000	¥95,059,800,000 ($1.191 billion)

== See also ==
- List of manga series by volume count
- List of series run in Weekly Shōnen Jump
- List of the highest-grossing media franchises
