= List of JoJo's Bizarre Adventure volumes =

The Japanese manga series JoJo's Bizarre Adventure is written and illustrated by Hirohiko Araki. It was originally serialized in Weekly Shōnen Jump from 1987 to 2004, before being transferred to the monthly seinen magazine Ultra Jump in 2005. The series can be broken into nine distinct parts, each following a different descendant of the protagonist of the first part on different quests. The ninth story arc, The JoJoLands, started in February 2023.

The chapters are collected and published into tankōbon volumes by Shueisha, with the first released on August 10, 1987. During Part 5, which takes place in Italy, the series' title was written in Italian as Le Bizzarre Avventure di GioGio. After volume 63, the beginning of each Part has reset the volume number count back at one.

The series was licensed for an English-language release in North America by Viz Media. However, instead of starting with Part 1, they chose to only release Part 3: Stardust Crusaders, which is the most well-known. The first volume was released on November 8, 2005, with the first twelve volumes summarized in an eight-page summary written and drawn by Araki himself, and the last on December 7, 2010. Viz Media began publishing the JoJonium edition of Part 1: Phantom Blood digitally in September 2014, with a three-volume hardcover print edition that includes color pages following throughout 2015. They began publishing Part 2: Battle Tendency in the same format digitally in March 2015 and in print in November 2015. They began re-releasing Stardust Crusaders in November 2016, this time in the same hardcover edition as the previous two parts. JoJo's Bizarre Adventure has also seen domestic releases in Italy by Star Comics, in France by J'ai Lu and Tonkam, Taiwan by Da Ran Culture Enterprise and Tong Li Publishing, and in Malaysia by Comics House.

== Volume list ==
=== Part 1: Phantom Blood ===
No.	Title	Japanese release date	Japanese ISBN
1	Dio the Invader; Shinryakusha Dio (侵略者ディオ)	August 10, 1987	978-4-08-851126-9
2	The Thirst for Blood! Chi no Kawaki! (血の渇き!)	January 8, 1988	978-4-08-851127-6
3	The Dark Knights; Ankoku no Kishi-tachi (暗黒の騎士達)	April 8, 1988	978-4-08-851128-3
4	To the Chamber of the Two-Headed Dragon; Sōshuryū no Ma e (双首竜の間へ)	June 10, 1988	978-4-08-851129-0
5	The Final Hamon! Saigo no Hamon! (最後の波紋!)	August 10, 1988	978-4-08-851130-6

=== Part 2: Battle Tendency ===
No.	Title	Japanese release date	Japanese ISBN
6	JoJo vs. The Ultimate Being; Jojo Tai Kyūkyoku Seibutsu (JoJo Vs.(たい) 究極生物)	October 7, 1988	978-4-08-851062-0
7	The Red Stone of Aja; Eija no Sekiseki (エイジャの赤石)	December 6, 1988	978-4-08-851063-7
8	The Final Trial! Saishū Shiren! (最終試練!)	February 10, 1989	978-4-08-851064-4
9	Race Toward the Cliff of Death; Shi no Gake e Tsuppashire (死の崖へつっ走れ)	April 10, 1989	978-4-08-851065-1
10	The Crimson Bubble; Senseki no Shabon (鮮赤のシャボン)	June 9, 1989	978-4-08-851066-8
11	The Warrior Returns to the Wind; Kaze ni Kaeru Senshi (風にかえる戦士)	August 10, 1989	978-4-08-851067-5
12	The Birth of a Superbeing!! Chō Seibutsu no Tanjō!! (超生物の誕生!!)	October 9, 1989	978-4-08-851068-2

=== Part 3: Stardust Crusaders ===
No.	Title	Original release date	English release date
13/1	Dio's Curse / The Evil Spirit; Dio no Jubaku (DIOの呪縛)	December 5, 1989; 978-4-08-851069-9	November 8, 2005; 978-1-59116-754-9
14/2	The Empty Ship and the Ape / Silver Chariot; Mujinsen to Saru (無人船と猿)	February 9, 1990; 978-4-08-851070-5	January 3, 2006; 978-1-59116-850-8
15/3	The Gun Is Mightier Than the Sword / The Emperor and the Hanged Man; Jū wa Ken yori mo Tsuyoshi (銃は剣よりも強し)	April 10, 1990; 978-4-08-851215-0	March 7, 2006; 978-1-4215-0336-3
16/4	Battle Experience! / Terror in India; Tatakai no Nenki! (戦いの年季!)	June 8, 1990; 978-4-08-851216-7	June 6, 2006; 978-1-4215-0653-1
17/5	The Terrifying Lovers / City of Death; Osoroshiki Rabāzu (恐ろしき恋人(ラバーズ))	August 8, 1990; 978-4-08-851217-4	September 5, 2006; 978-1-4215-0654-8
18/6	Death 13 of Dreams / The Arabian Nightmare; Yume no Desu Sātīn (夢のDEATH(デス)13(サーティーン))	October 8, 1990; 978-4-08-851218-1	December 5, 2006; 978-1-4215-0655-5
19/7	The Magic Lamp / The Three Wishes; Mahō no Ranpu (魔法のランプ)	December 4, 1990; 978-4-08-851219-8	April 3, 2007; 978-1-4215-1078-1
20/8	The Exploding Orange / Iggy the Fool and the God Geb (Note: Although the back cover of the English release uses the title Iggy the Fool and the Great God Geb, the title page and the titles of the titular chapters leave out the word "Great."); Bakudan-jikake no Orenji (爆弾仕かけのオレンジ)	February 8, 1991; 978-4-08-851220-4	August 7, 2007; 978-1-4215-1079-8
21/9	A Woman with Wonderful Legs / The Deadly Sword; Ashi ga Gunbatsu no Onna (脚がグンバツの女)	May 10, 1991; 978-4-08-851564-9	December 4, 2007; 978-1-4215-1080-4
22/10	Disappearance in a Locked Room / The Shadow of Set; Misshitsu de Shōshitsu (密室で消失)	July 10, 1991; 978-4-08-851565-6	April 1, 2008; 978-1-4215-1081-1
23/11	D'Arby's Collection / D'Arby the Gambler; Dābīzu Korekushon (ダービーズコレクション)	September 10, 1991; 978-4-08-851566-3	April 7, 2009; 978-1-4215-1632-5
24/12	Pet Shop, the Gatekeeper of Hell / The Claws of Horus; Jigoku no Monban Petto Shoppu (地獄の門番ペット・ショップ)	November 8, 1991; 978-4-08-851567-0	August 4, 2009; 978-1-4215-1633-2
25/13	D'Arby the Player; Dābī za Pureiyā (ダービー・ザ・プレイヤー)	February 10, 1992; 978-4-08-851568-7	December 1, 2009; 978-1-4215-2406-1
26/14	The Miasma of the Void, Vanilla Ice / Showdown; Akū no Shōki Vanira Aisu (亜空の瘴気 ヴァニラ・アイス)	April 10, 1992; 978-4-08-851569-4	April 6, 2010; 978-1-4215-2407-8
27/15	Dio's World; Dio no Sekai (DIOの世界)	June 10, 1992; 978-4-08-851570-0	August 3, 2010; 978-1-4215-2408-5
28/16	The Faraway Journey, Farewell Friends / Journey's End; Haruka naru Tabiji Saraba Tomo yo (遥かなる旅路 さらば友よ)	August 4, 1992; 978-4-08-851634-9	December 7, 2010; 978-1-4215-3084-0

=== Part 4: Diamond Is Unbreakable ===
No.	Title	Japanese release date	Japanese ISBN
29	Enter Josuke Higashikata; Higashikata Jōsuke Tōjō Suru (東方仗助登場する)	November 4, 1992	978-4-08-851635-6
30	Okuyasu and Keicho Nijimura; Nijimura Okuyasu, Keichō (虹村億泰・形兆)	January 7, 1993	978-4-08-851636-3
31	Koichi Hirose (Echoes); Hirose Kōichi (Ekōzu) (広瀬康一（エコーズ）)	March 4, 1993	978-4-08-851637-0
32	Yukako Yamagishi Falls In Love; Yamagishi Yukako wa Koi o Suru (山岸由花子は恋をする)	May 10, 1993	978-4-08-851638-7
33	Let's Go Eat Some Italian Food; Itaria Ryōri o Tabe ni Ikō (イタリア料理を食べに行こう)	July 2, 1993	978-4-08-851639-4
34	Let's Go to the Manga Artist's House; Mangaka no Uchi e Asobi ni Ikō (漫画家のうちへ遊びに行こう)	September 3, 1993	978-4-08-851640-0
35	Rohan Kishibe's Adventure; Kishibe Rohan no Bōken (岸辺露伴の冒険)	November 4, 1993	978-4-08-851405-5
36	Shigechi's Harvest "Shigechī" no Hāvesuto (｢重ちー｣の収穫(ハーヴェスト))	February 4, 1994	978-4-08-851406-2
37	Yoshikage Kira Wants to Live Quietly; Kira Yoshikage wa Shizuka ni Kurashitai (吉良吉影は静かに暮らしたい)	May 2, 1994	978-4-08-851407-9
38	Sheer Heart Attack; Shiā Hāto Atakku (シアーハートアタック)	August 4, 1994	978-4-08-851408-6
39	Father's Tears; Chichi no Namida (父の涙)	November 4, 1994	978-4-08-851409-3
40	Rock-Paper-Scissors Kid Is Coming; Janken Kozō ga Yatte Kuru (ジャンケン小僧がやって来る！)	January 11, 1995	978-4-08-851410-9
41	Highway Star; Haiwei Sutā (ハイウェイ・スター)	March 3, 1995	978-4-08-851891-6
42	Cats Love Yoshikage Kira; Neko wa Kira Yoshikage ga Suki (猫は吉良吉影が好き)	May 11, 1995	978-4-08-851892-3
43	Enigma Is an Enigma! Eniguma wa Nazo da! (エニグマは謎だ!)	August 4, 1995	978-4-08-851893-0
44	My Dad Is Not My Dad; Boku no Papa wa Papa ja Nai (ぼくのパパはパパじゃない)	October 4, 1995	978-4-08-851894-7
45	Another One Bites the Dust; Anazāwan Baitsa Dasuto (アナザーワン バイツァ・ダスト)	January 10, 1996	978-4-08-851895-4
46	Crazy Diamond Is Unbreakable; Kureijī Daiyamondo wa Kudakenai (クレイジー・D(ダイヤモンド)は砕けない)	March 4, 1996	978-4-08-851896-1

=== Part 5: Golden Wind ===
No.	Title	Japanese release date	Japanese ISBN
47	Goodbye Morioh Town–The Golden Heart; Sayonara Moriō-chō - Ōgon no Kokoro (さよなら杜王町–黄金の心)	May 10, 1996	978-4-08-851897-8
48	My Dream Is to Be a Gang Star; Boku no Yume wa Gyangu Sutā (ぼくの夢はギャング・スター)	July 4, 1996	978-4-08-851898-5
49	Find Polpo's Fortune! Porupo no Isan o Nerae! (ポルポの遺産を狙え!)	September 4, 1996	978-4-08-851899-2
50	Bucciarati Capo: The First Order from the Boss; Bucharati Kanbu: Bosu kara no Daichi Shirei (ブチャラティ幹部:ボスからの第一指令)	November 1, 1996	978-4-08-851119-1
51	The Second Mission from the Boss: "Get the Key!"; Bosu kara no Daini Shirei: "Kī o Getto seyo!" (ボスからの第二指令:「鍵(キー)をゲットせよ!」)	February 4, 1997	978-4-08-851120-7
52	Express Train to Florence; Firentse Iki Chōtokkyū (フィレンツェ行き超特急)	April 4, 1997	978-4-08-872039-5
53	The Grateful Dead; Za Gureitofuru Deddo (偉大なる死(ザ・グレイトフル・デッド))	June 4, 1997	978-4-08-872040-1
54	Gold Experience's Counterattack; Gōrudo Ekusuperiensu no Gyakushū (ゴールド・エクスペリエンスの逆襲)	September 4, 1997	978-4-08-872174-3
55	The Venice Landing Operation; Venetsia Jōriku Sakusen (ヴェネツィア上陸作戦)	November 4, 1997	978-4-08-872175-0
56	The "G" in Guts "Gattsu no 'Jī'" (ガッツの「G」)	January 9, 1998	978-4-08-872501-7
57	No Flightcode! Unearth the Boss's Past; Furaito Kōdo Nashi! Bosu no Kako o Abake (フライト・コードなし! ボスの過去をあばけ)	March 4, 1998	978-4-08-872526-0
58	My Name Is Doppio; Boku no Na wa Doppio (ぼくの名はドッピオ)	June 4, 1998	978-4-08-872562-8
59	Under a Sky That Could Come Falling Any Minute; Ima ni mo Ochite Kisō na Sora no Shita de (今にも落ちて来そうな空の下で)	August 4, 1998	978-4-08-872588-8
60	Meet the Man in the Colosseum! Korosseo no Otoko ni Ae! (コロッセオの男に会え!)	October 2, 1998	978-4-08-872613-7
61	His Name Is Diavolo; Soitsu no Na wa Diaboro (そいつの名はディアボロ)	January 8, 1999	978-4-08-872652-6
62	The Requiem Quietly Plays; Rekuiemu wa Shizuka ni Kanaderareru (鎮魂歌(レクイエム)は静かに奏でられる)	March 4, 1999	978-4-08-872680-9
63	The Sleeping Slave; Nemureru Dorei (眠れる奴隷)	April 30, 1999	978-4-08-872709-7

=== Part 6: Stone Ocean ===
No.	Title	Japanese release date	Japanese ISBN
1 (64)	Prisoner FE40536–Jolyne Cujoh; Shūjin Bangō FE40536 Kūjō Jorīn (囚人番号FE40536空条徐倫)	May 1, 2000	978-4-08-872866-7
2 (65)	The Visitor to Green Dolphin Street Prison; Gurīn Dorufin Sutorīto Keimusho no Menkainin (グリーン・ドルフィン・ストリート刑務所の面会人)	August 4, 2000	978-4-08-872899-5
3 (66)	Prisoner of Love; Purizunā Obu Ravu (プリズナー・オブ・ラヴ)	October 4, 2000	978-4-08-873027-1
4 (67)	Go, Foo Fighters! Iku zo! Fū Faitāzu (行くぞ!フー・ファイターズ)	December 4, 2000	978-4-08-873051-6
5 (68)	Operation Savage Garden (Head to the Courtyard!); Saveji Gāden Sakusen (Nakaniwa e Mukae!) (サヴェジ・ガーデン作戦 (中庭へ向かえ!))	February 2, 2001	978-4-08-873077-6
6 (69)	Torrential Downpour Warning; Shūchū Gōu Keihō Hatsurei (集中豪雨警報発令)	April 4, 2001	978-4-08-873103-2
7 (70)	Ultra Security House Unit; Urutora Sekyuriti Chōbatsubō (ウルトラセキュリティ懲罰房)	June 4, 2001	978-4-08-873126-1
8 (71)	Enter the Dragon's Dream; Moe yo Doragonzu Dorīmu (燃えよ竜の夢(ドラゴンズ・ドリーム))	September 4, 2001	978-4-08-873160-5
9 (72)	Birth of the Green; Midori-iro no Tanjō (緑色の誕生)	November 2, 2001	978-4-08-873183-4
10 (73)	Awaken; Aweikun - Mezame (AWAKEN(アウェイクン)-目覚め)	February 4, 2002	978-4-08-873225-1
11 (74)	Head Out! Time for Heaven; Mukae! Tengoku no Toki (向かえ! 天国の時)	April 4, 2002	978-4-08-873250-3
12 (75)	Jailbreak... Datsugoku e... (脱獄へ…)	July 4, 2002	978-4-08-873284-8
13 (76)	Sky-High Sky High! Sora Takaku Sukai Hai! (空高くスカイ・ハイ!)	September 4, 2002	978-4-08-873315-9
14 (77)	Time for Heaven: Three Days Until the New Moon; Tengoku no Toki Shingetsu made Ato Mikka (天国の時 新月まであと3日)	December 4, 2002	978-4-08-873346-3
15 (78)	Heavy Weather; Hebī Wezā (ヘビー・ウェザー)	February 4, 2003	978-4-08-873383-8
16 (79)	At Cape Canaveral; Kēpu Kanaberaru nite (ケープ・カナベラルにて)	April 4, 2003	978-4-08-873410-1
17 (80)	Made in Heaven; Meido In Hebun (メイド・イン・ヘブン)	July 4, 2003	978-4-08-873483-5

=== Part 7: Steel Ball Run ===
No.	Title	Japanese release date	Japanese ISBN
1 (81)	September 25, 1890: San Diego Beach; Sen Happyaku Kyūjū Nen Kugatsu Nijūgonichi San Diego Bīchi (1890年9月25日 サンディエゴビーチ)	May 20, 2004	4-08-873601-X
2 (82)	1st Stage: 15,000 Meters; Fāsuto Sutēji Ichiman Gosen Mētoru (1st. STAGE 15,000メートル)	May 20, 2004	4-08-873613-3
3 (83)	2nd Stage: Across the Arizona Desert; Sekando Sutēji Arizona Sabaku Goe (2nd. STAGE アリゾナ砂漠越え)	November 4, 2004	4-08-873673-7
4 (84)	Gyro Zeppeli's Mission; Jairo Tseperi no Shukumei (ジャイロ・ツェペリの宿命)	November 4, 2004	4-08-873689-3
5 (85)	The President's Conspiracy; Daitōryō no Inbō (大統領の陰謀)	August 4, 2005	4-08-873845-4
6 (86)	Scary Monsters; Sukearī Monsutāzu (スケアリー モンスターズ)	November 4, 2005	4-08-873890-X
7 (87)	A Little Tomb on the Wide, Wide Prairie; Hiroi Hiroi Daisōgen no Chīsana Bohyō (広い広い大草原の小さな墓標)	March 3, 2006	4-08-874117-X
8 (88)	To the World of Man; Otoko no Sekai e (男の世界へ)	May 2, 2006	4-08-874119-6
9 (89)	A Stormy Night Is Coming; Arashi no Yoru ga Yatte Kuru (嵐の夜がやってくる)	September 4, 2006	4-08-874147-1
10 (90)	Illinois Skyline, Michigan Lakeline; Irinoi Sukairain Mishigan Reikurain (イリノイ・スカイライン ミシガン・レイクライン)	November 2, 2006	4-08-874285-0
11 (91)	Make the Golden Rectangle! Ōgon Chōhōkei o Tsukure! (黄金長方形をつくれ!)	March 2, 2007	978-4-08-874336-3
12 (92)	Conditions for the Corpse, Conditions for Friendship; Itai e no Jōken Yūjō e no Jōken (遺体への条件 友情への条件)	May 2, 2007	978-4-08-874362-2
13 (93)	Wrecking Ball; Kowareyuku Tekkyū (壊れゆく鉄球)	September 4, 2007	978-4-08-874420-9
14 (94)	The Victor's Qualifications; Shōrisha e no Shikaku (勝利者への資格)	December 4, 2007	978-4-08-874438-4
15 (95)	A Dream of Gettysburg; Getisubāgu no Yume (ゲティスバーグの夢)	May 2, 2008	978-4-08-874518-3
16 (96)	Dirty Deeds Done Dirt Cheap; Itomo Tayasuku Okonawareru Egutsunai Kōi (いともたやすく行われる えげつない行為)	September 4, 2008	978-4-08-874574-9
17 (97)	D4C; Dī Fō Shī (D4C(ディ・フォー・シー))	March 4, 2009	978-4-08-874648-7
18 (98)	Ticket to Ride; Chikettu Raido (涙の乗車券(チケット・ゥ・ライド))	July 3, 2009	978-4-08-874725-5
19 (99)	It Won't Make You Rich; Okane Mochi ni wa Narenai (お金持ちにはなれない)	November 4, 2009	978-4-08-874769-9
20 (100)	Love Train - The World Is One; Rabu Torein - Sekai wa Hitotsu (ラブトレイン-世界はひとつ)	March 9, 2010	978-4-08-870060-1
21 (101)	Ball Breaker; Bōru Bureikā (ボール・ブレイカー)	July 2, 2010	978-4-08-870099-1
22 (102)	Break My Heart, Break Your Heart; Bureiku Mai Hāto Bureiku Yua Hāto (ブレイク・マイ・ハート ブレイク・ユア・ハート)	November 4, 2010	978-4-08-870160-8
23 (103)	High Voltage; Hai Vorutēji (ハイ・ヴォルテージ)	May 19, 2011	978-4-08-870206-3
24 (104)	Stars and Stripes Forever; Seijōki yo Eien Nare (星条旗よ 永遠なれ)	June 3, 2011	978-4-08-870253-7

=== Part 8: JoJolion ===
No.	Title	Japanese release date	Japanese ISBN
1 (105)	Welcome to Morioh Town; Yōkoso, Moriō-chō e (ようこそ 杜王町へ)	December 19, 2011	978-4-08-870311-4
2 (106)	His Name Is Josuke Higashikata; Higashikata Jōsuke toiu Namae (東方定助という名前)	April 19, 2012	978-4-08-870413-5
3 (107)	Their Family Tree; Sono Kakeizu (その家系図)	September 19, 2012	978-4-08-870526-2
4 (108)	The Lemon and the Tangerine; Remon to Mikan (レモンとみかん)	May 17, 2013	978-4-08-870642-9
5 (109)	Morioh Town: 1901; Moriō-chō "Sen Kyū-hyaku Ichi Nen" (杜王町『1901年』)	October 18, 2013	978-4-08-870830-0
6 (110)	Tsurugi Higashikata's Goal, and the Architect; Higashikata Tsurugi no Mokuteki, Soshite Kenchikka (東方つるぎの目的 そして建築家)	March 19, 2014	978-4-08-870891-1
7 (111)	King Nothing; Kingu Nasshingu (キング・ナッシング)	May 19, 2014	978-4-08-880087-5
8 (112)	Every Day Is a Summer Vacation; Mainichi ga Natsuyasumi (毎日が夏休み)	October 17, 2014	978-4-08-880238-1
9 (113)	Eldest Son: Jobin Higashikata; Danchō: Higashikata Jōbin (長男・東方常敏)	February 19, 2015	978-4-08-880314-2
10 (114)	Follow the Locacaca Tree! Locacaca no Ki o Oe! (ロカカカの樹を追え!)	July 17, 2015	978-4-08-880436-1
11 (115)	The Twins Are Coming to Town; Sōji ga Machi ni Yattekuru (双児が町にやって来る)	December 18, 2015	978-4-08-880548-1
12 (116)	Hato's Boyfriend; Hato-chan no Bōifurendo (鳩ちゃんのボーイフレンド)	March 18, 2016	978-4-08-880647-1
13 (117)	Walking Heart; Wōkingu Hāto (ウォーキング・ハート)	July 19, 2016	978-4-08-880742-3
14 (118)	Dawn of the Higashikata Household; Higashikata-ke no Yoake (東方家の夜明け)	December 19, 2016	978-4-08-880880-2
15 (119)	Dolomite's Blue Lagoon; Doromite no Aoi Sangoshō (ドロミテの青い珊瑚礁)	July 19, 2017	978-4-08-880882-6
16 (120)	Mother and Child; Haha to Ko (母と子)	September 19, 2017	978-4-08-881233-5
17 (121)	Escape from Mount Hanarero; Hanareroyama kara Dasshutsu Shiro (鼻炉山から脱出しろ)	December 19, 2017	978-4-08-881443-8
18 (122)	North of the Higashikata Household. The Orchard; Higashikata-ke no Kita. Kajuen (東方家の北。果樹園)	July 19, 2018	978-4-08-881452-0
19 (123)	Orthopedic Surgeon Dr. Wu Tomoki; Seikeigekai – Ū Tomoki-sensei (整形外科医 – 羽伴毅先生)	October 19, 2018	978-4-08-881596-1
20 (124)	Please Come With Me. Doctor Wu; Issho ni Onegai. Dokutā Ū (一緒にお願い。ドクター・ウー)	March 19, 2019	978-4-08-881777-4
21 (125)	The Wonder of You; Za Wandā Obu Yū (ザ・ワンダー・オブ・ユー)	July 19, 2019	978-4-08-882015-6
22 (126)	TG University Hospital Head Doctor: Satoru Akefu; TG Daigaku Byōin Inchō - Akefu Satoru (TG大学病院院長 - 明負悟)	December 19, 2019	978-4-08-882167-2
23 (127)	Whole Lotta Love; Mune Ippai no Ai wo (胸いっぱいの愛を)	April 17, 2020	978-4-08-882278-5
24 (128)	Just Don't Move; Ugokanai Shikanai (動かないしかない)	October 16, 2020	978-4-08-882394-2
25 (129)	The Ultimate Dilemma; Kyūkyoku no Jirenma (究極のジレンマ)	December 18, 2020	978-4-08-882544-1
26 (130)	Go Beyond; Gō Biyondo (ゴー・ビヨンド)	May 19, 2021	978-4-08-882697-4
27 (131)	When All Curses Are Broken; Subete no Noroi ga Tokeru Toki (全ての呪いが解けるとき)	September 17, 2021	978-4-08-882836-7

=== Part 9: The JoJoLands ===
No.	Title	Japanese release date	Japanese ISBN
1 (132)	Departure; Shuppatsu (Dipāchā) (出発 DEPARTURE)	August 18, 2023	978-4-08-883606-5
2 (133)	"Rise Up" "Nobotte Ike" (『上って行け』)	December 19, 2023	978-4-08-883765-9
3 (134)	"Money-Making Time" "Kanemōke no Jikan" (『金儲けの時間』)	April 18, 2024	978-4-08-884038-3
4 (135)	"Joestar Brothers" "Jōsutā Kyōdai" (『ジョースター兄弟』)	August 19, 2024	978-4-08-884157-1
5 (136)	"Deed" "Dīdo (Tochi Jōto Shōsho)" (『DEED（土地譲渡証書）』)	December 18, 2024	978-4-08-884298-1
6 (137)	"Board the Megayacht" "Megayotto ni Jōsen seyo" (『メガヨットに乗船せよ』)	July 17, 2025	978-4-08-884476-3
7 (138)	"Those Who Lurk in the Gaps" "Sukima ni Hisomu Monotachi" (『隙間に潜む者たち』)	December 18, 2025	978-4-08-884628-6
8 (139)	"System Reversal / Total Destruction" "Shisutemu Gyakuten Kanzen Hakai" (『システム逆転・完全破壊』)	March 19, 2026	978-4-08-884852-5
9 (140)	"9 Months Later" "9-kagetsu tatte" (『9か月たって』)	September 17, 2026	978-4-08-885157-0
