= List of City Hunter chapters =

Manga in Shueisha's Weekly Shōnen Jump magazine

Cover of the first volume as released in Japan by Shueisha

In Japan, the City Hunter manga ran for six years in Shueisha's Weekly Shōnen Jump magazine from Issue 13 of 1985 to Issue 50 of 1991. The first compiled City Hunter collections were published under the Jump Comics imprint from 1985 to 1992, and totaled 35 volumes. The second edition was from Shueisha Editions, who published an 18 book version between 1996 and 1997. Bunch World published a 39 volume edition between 2001 and 2002. Most recently, Tokuma Comics published a "Complete Edition" of 32 books, each with bonus material between 2004 and early 2005.

In North America, the first five volumes were published by Gutsoon! Entertainment and serialized in Raijin Comics. The series has been published digitally in English by Coamix through Manga Hot before being by Abrams Books through Kana Manga in 3-1 omnibus books since September 23, 2025.

The series has also been translated into Chinese, French, German, Italian, Vietnamese, Spanish, and Indonesian.

== Volume list ==
No.	Title	Original release date	English release date
01	The Angel Dust of Fear; Kyōfu no Enjeru Dasuto no Maki (恐怖のエンジェルダストの巻)	January 1986; 4-08-852381-4	June 1, 2003 (Gustoon!) September 23, 2025 (Kana Manga); 979-8887079448
001. Ten Seconds of Dishonour; 002. The BMW Devil; 003. The Shooter from the Darkness; 004. The Angel Dust of Fear; 005. A Cool Partner; Gutsoon! edition: 01 Ten Count with No Glory; 02 The Devil in the BMW Part 1; 03 The Devil in the BMW Part 2; 04 The Devil in the BMW Part 3; 05 A Sniper in the Dark; 06 Angel Dust Part 1; 07 Angel Dust Part 2; 08 A Wonderful Partner
02	The General's Trap; Shōgun no Wana! no Maki (将軍の罠！の巻)	April 1986; 4-08-852382-2	August 1, 2003 (Gustoon!) September 23, 2025 (Kana Manga); 979-8887079448
006. The General's Trap; 007. Don't Give Anything to an Asshole; 008. A Dangerous Instructor; Gustoon! edition: 09. The General's Trap Part 1; 10. The General's Trap Part 2; 11. The General's Trap Part 3; 12. The General's Trap Part 4; 13. The General's Trap Part 5; 14. Don't Give Scoundrels Anything!; 15. The Dangerous Private Tutor! Part 1; 16. The Dangerous Private Tutor! Part 2; 17. The Dangerous Private Tutor! Part 3
03	The Barefoot Actress; Hadashi no Joyū no Maki (裸足の女優の巻)	June 1986; 4-08-852383-0	October 29, 2003 (Gustoon!) September 23, 2025 (Kana Manga); 979-8887079448
009. The Ruined Gang; 010. The Waiting Little Girl; 011. The Barefoot Actress; 012. Making Panic; Gustoon! Edition: 18. Unbalanced Gangsters; 19. The Waiting Girl Part 1; 20. The Waiting Girl Part 2; 21. The Waiting Girl Part 3; 22. The Natural Part 1; 23. The Natural Part 2; 24. The Natural Part 3; 25. Trouble on the Set Part 1; 26. Trouble on the Set Part 2
04	The Knell of Fate; Kane to Tomoni Unmei ga! no Maki (鐘とともに運命が！の巻)	September 1986; 4-08-852384-9	December 29, 2003 (Gutsoon!) January 13, 2026 (Kana Manga); 979-8887079851
013. A Pounding Heart; 014. Shoot the Ghost; 015. A Lame Teacher; 016. The Scar of Memory; 017. The Knell of Fate; Gustoon! Edition: 27. Wandering Heart; 28. Shoot the Ghost!; 29. The Wacky Professor Part 1; 30. The Wacky Professor Part 2; 31. The Wacky Professor Part 3; 32. The Scar Part 1; 33. The Scar Part 2; 34. The Scar Part 3; 35. Fate as the Bell Tolls
05	One in a Thousand; Wan・Obu・Sauzando no Maki (ワン・オブ・サウザンドの巻)	December 1986; 4-08-852385-7	April 1, 2004 (Gutsoon!) January 13, 2026 (Kana Manga); 979-8887079851
018. Don't Touch That Girl; 019. One in a Thousand; 020. What a Pervert!; 021. The Men's Detector; 022. The Game's Queen; Gustoon! Edition: 36. Don't Touch that Woman!; 37. One in a Thousand Part 1; 38. One in a Thousand Part 2; 39. Tenacity Part 1; 40. Tenacity Part 2; 41. Creepy Male Detector Part 1; 42. Creepy Male Detector Part 2; 43. Creepy Male Detector Part 3; 44. Gambling Queen
06	The Melancholic Player; Aishū no Gyanburā no Maki (哀愁のギャンブラーの巻)	February 1987; 4-08-852386-5	January 13, 2026; 979-8887079851
023. The Melancholic Player; 024. A Captivating Guy; English Edition: 45. The Sorrowful Gambler; 46. The Gambler Vampire; 47. A Dangerous Victory!; 48. The Prodigy's Miscalculation!; 49. After Service of Love; 50. Idol on the Run!; 51. She's Got my Interest!; 52. Mystery Miniskirt!
07	The Woman from a Dangerous Country; Kiken'na Kuni kara Kita On'na! no Maki (危険な国からきた女！の巻)	April 1987; 4-08-852387-3	June 2, 2026; 979-8887079868
025. Love is Blind; 026. The Woman from a Dangerous Country; 027. The Nice Flying Ass; English Edition: 53. The Worst Thing Ever!; 54. Love is Blind!; 55. Wedding Announcement Panic!; 56. Woman From a Dangerous Land; 57. The Cute Tutor!; 58. False Start of Love; 59. Laws of Emalia!; 60. Sweet Betrayal!; 61. At Love and Pain's End?; 62. The Flying Tush
08	The Angel's Smile; Tenshi no Hohoemi no Maki (天使のほほえみの巻)	June 1987; 4-08-852388-1	June 2, 2026; 979-8887079868
028. An Extravagant Doctor; 029. The Tulip of His Heart; 030. The Angel's Smile; 031. What is Love?; 032. Ryo's Love Lesson; English Edition: 63. The Nutty Professor!; 64. Magic Trick!; 65. Very, Veeery Good Job!; 66. Sanchos's Revolt!; 67. A Tulip Blooms In The Heart; 68. An Angel's Smile; 69. What is Love?; 70. The Iron-Clad Date!!; 71. Ryo the Kid's Love Lecture
09	Beach of Remembrance; Omoide no Nagisa no Maki (思い出の渚の巻)	August 1987; 4-08-852389-X	June 2, 2026; 979-8887079868
033. Not Even Doctors or Hot Springs can Cure; 034. First Love; 035. Beach of Remembrance; 036. A Bride Fell from the Sky; English Edition: 72. No Doctor or Remedy for Love!!; 73. First Love; 74. Shore of Memories; 75. Don't Call Me Daddy!; 76. One Look At You!; 77. Audition Canceled?!; 78. Surprise Mastermind!!; 79. Vivid Memories
10	Do Not Touch The Nurse! Kangofu ni wa Te wo Dasuna! no Maki (看護婦には手を出すな！の巻)	October 1987; 4-08-852390-3	—
037. Dangerous Antidote; 038. Do Not Touch the Nurse!
11	Makimura's Legacy; Makimura no Wasure Mono no Maki (槇村の忘れものの巻)	December 1987; 4-08-852391-1	—
039. Goodbye...and Hello!; 040. That Night's Misunderstanding; 041. Operation Bra; 042. Makimura's Legacy; 043. Ryo in Danger; 044. Ryo's Pure Love Story
12	Trouble Scoop; Toraburu・Sukūpu no Maki (トラブル・スクープの巻)	February 1988; 4-08-852392-X	—
045. A Pretty Newscaster's Strength; 046. Trouble Scoop; 047. Reiko's Situation; 048. Chance Meeting Love Divination; 049. Cinderella's Dream
13	Umibozu and Daddy Long Legs; Umibōzu to Ashinaga Ojisan no Maki (海坊主と足ながおじさんの巻)	April 1988; 4-08-852393-8	—
050. Dark Stiffy; 051. Say Cheese; 052. Do You Loathe Fortune Telling?!; 053. Umibozu's Request; 054. Snake Appears!; 055. The Last Performance
14	Do Your Best! Kaori-chan!! Ganbare! Kaori-chan! ! no Maki (がんばれ！香ちゃん！！の巻)	June 1988; 4-08-852394-6	—
056. Kaori-chan is the Target!?; 057. Sayonara...; 058. Do Your Best! Kaori-chan!!; 059. The Woman that Just Arrived; 060. The Culprit Makes his Move
15	Confession at the Airport; Kokuhaku no Eaporuto no Maki (告白のエアポートの巻)	August 1988; 4-08-852395-4	—
061. Love Love Battle; 062. On the Verge of Jealousy; 063. A Harem has its Price; 064. Tokyo Dating Chaos; 065. Kidnapped Princess!?; 066. Confession at the Airport; 067. New Neighbor Next Door
16	My Lover is the City Hunter; Koibito wa Shitī Hantā no Maki (恋人はシティーハンターの巻)	October 1988; 4-08-852396-2	—
068. Maiko's Personal Bodyguard; 069. Follow Your Instinct!?; 070. Do You Want Me to Protect You!?; 071. The Long Awaited Breakthrough!?; 072. My Lover is the City Hunter; 073. Confession at the Door; 074. Your Secret Pastime
17	Dawn's Memory; Akatsuki no MEMORY no Maki (暁のMEMORYの巻)	December 1988; 4-08-852397-0	—
075. Unyielding Yoko-san; 076. Dawn's Memory; 077. The Late Coming of Spring; 078. Kaori's First Date; 079. A Dangerous Pairing; 080. Please Forgive Me; 081. The Skirtchaser in the Cemetery
18	Umibozu's Love!! Umibōzu ni Zokkon! ! no Maki (海坊主にゾッコン！！の巻)	February 1989; 4-08-852398-9	—
082. A Madame Who is a College Student; 083. A Heartbroken Widow; 084. A Grand Display Of Fireworks; 085. A White Canvas; 086. Falcon's Second; 087. History's Strongest Tactics; 088. Umibozu's Love!!
19	A Sorrowful Angel; Kanashī Tenshi no Maki (哀しい天使の巻)	April 1989; 4-08-852399-7	—
089. Umibozu's Beloved; 090. A Sorrowful Angel; 091. Jealous Sara; 092. Give Me Courage; 093. Reappearance of the Flying Tush; 094. Mokkori Kidnapped
20	The Other Side of Goodbye; Sayonara no Mukō-gawa... no Maki (さよならの向こう側…の巻)	June 1989; 4-08-852400-4	—
095. Let the Thieving Challenge Begin!; 096. Secrets in the Mirror; 097. The Grief of My Sister; 098. The Bond of Sisters; 099. Dreams Hidden in the Ring; 100. Ryo Comes Into Play; 101. The Other Side of Goodbye
21	Light Signals from the Neighborhood; Biru-gai no Kōru Sain no Maki (ビル街のコールサインの巻)	August 1989; 4-08-852612-0	—
102. Light Signals from the Neighborhood; 103. The Man Longed For in a Dream; 104. Sailor Uniform Panic; 105. Proposal Fantasy; 106. You Have to Say I Love You Too
22	Hand Over The Python To That Missy! Ojōsan ni Paison o! no Maki (お嬢さんにパイソンを！の巻)	October 1989; 4-08-852613-9	—
107. Magnum of Anger; 108. Their First Meeting After 14 Years; 109. Hand Over The Python To That Missy!; 110. The World's Best Detective is Born?!; 111. The Owner of a Sexy Ass
23	Tomorrow, A New Beginning; Ashita e no Ribaibaru no Maki (明日へのリバイバルの巻)	December 1989; 4-08-852614-7	—
112. A Birthday of Tears; 113. The Unfathomable Heart of a Woman; 114. Love is Stronger than All Guns; 115. Tomorrow, A New Beginning; 116. Afraid to Fly; 117. The Sweeper Who Cannot Fly
24	A Confession in the Skies; Ōzora no Kokuhaku no Maki (大空の告白の巻)	February 1990; 4-08-852615-5	—
118. Fright, Flight; 119. Airport 89; 120. A Confession in the Skies; 121. An Angel's Forgotten Gift?; 122. A Longing View for His Back; 123. Do Your Best, Kaori!; 124. Koumori vs Ryo!; 125. Turning the Back to the Past
25	Play it Again, Mami! Play it Again, Mami! -Ano kyoku o Mōichido! - no Maki (Play it Again, Mami! ―あの曲をもう一度！―の巻)	April 1990; 4-08-852616-3	—
126. A Ghost for a Client; 127, Two Twin Dolls?; 128. The Horror Date in the Dark; 129. The Other Me in the Mirror; 130. The Pianist in the Blaze; 131. Play it Again, Mami!; 132. Beauty and the Beast; 133. Duel at the Port
26	A Chance Encounter; Totsuzen no Deai! ! no Maki (突然の出会い！！の巻)	June 1990; 4-08-852617-1	—
134. A Tearful Donation Drive; 135. A Chance Encounter; 136. To Tear Apart the Heart; 137. Deep Ties; 138. My Lover, Ryo-chan!?
27	Cinderella in the City; Tokai no Shinderera! ! no Maki (都会のシンデレラ！！の巻)	August 1990; 4-08-852618-X	—
139. If Kaori Wore Swim Suits?; 140. The Focal Point of Beauty; 141. Secret of the Overcoat?; 142. Beautiful Escape; 143. Cinderella in the City (Part 1); 144. Cinderella in the City (Part 2); 145. Guy She Wants Killed; 146. Resolution at the Break of Dawn
28	Tide of Battle; Shōhai no Yukue! ! no Maki (勝敗の行方！！の巻)	October 1990; 4-08-852619-8	—
147. Scars of the Past; 148. Start of the Duel; 149. Tide of Battle; 150. The Best Present; 151. Grandfather to Appear!?; 152. Ryo's Fiancée is Being Attacked!?; 153. The Abducted Bust (with Tag on Grandfather)
29	Ijuin Hayato's Peaceful Day; Ijūin Hayato-shi no Heion'na Ichinichi no Maki (伊集院隼人氏の平穏な一日の巻)	December 1990; 4-08-852620-1	—
154. The Despicable Trap?; 155. Two City Hunters; 156. Ijuin Hayato's Peaceful Day; 157. Saeko's Match Making; 158. Brother's Resemblance; 159. The Changing Scenario; 160. Put Everything on the Line, Partner
30	Please, Erase My Memories... Omoidashi o Keshite... no Maki (思い出を消して…の巻)	February 1991; 4-08-852191-9	—
161. A Vanished Past; 162. The Call of Death by Suggestion; 163. Please, Erase My Memories...; 164. Registration Plate: LOVE?!; 165. The Transportation of Fear; 166. The Woman Who Sings a Code
31	Two People, One Heart! Futari de Hitori no Kokoro! no Maki (ふたりでひとりの心！！の巻)	May 1991; 4-08-852192-7	—
167. The Great Escape!; 168. Become My Partner!; 169. Ryo and the Scarily Similar Sisters!!; 170. Dad's Coming!; 171. A Coward!!; 172. Two People, One Heart!; 173. The Conspiracy of 10 Times Mokkori!?; 174. Vanished Mokkori
32	The Two Weirdos; Okashī na Futari! ! no Maki (おかしなふたり！！の巻)	August 1991; 4-08-852193-5	—
175. The Two Weirdos; 176. Memory Tracking Through the Photo
33	Set Sail to Hell! Jigoku e no Shukkō! ! no Maki (地獄への出航！！の巻)	December 1991; 4-08-852194-3	—
177. Sorrowful Farewell; 178. Pendant of Tears; 179. Before the Storm; 180. Set Sail to Hell!; 181. Love and Hatred; 182. The Pendant's Memory!
34	A Fake City Hunter; Nise C・H Tōjō! ! no Maki (にせC・H登場！！の巻)	February 1992; 4-08-852195-1	—
183. My Son; 184. Return from Hell!; 185. The Hero's Wound; 186. The Doggie Cleaner!; 187. A Fake City Hunter
35	Forever, City Hunter!! FOREVER, CITY HUNTER! ! no Maki (FOREVER, CITY HUNTER!!の巻)	April 1992; 4-08-852196-X	—
188. Two Partners with Bite; 189. Honesty; 190. Wedding Bells; 191. Forever, City Hunter
