= List of Captain Tsubasa volumes =

The manga Captain Tsubasa is written and illustrated by Yōichi Takahashi. The series focuses on the development of a young football (soccer) player Tsubasa Oozora. The series was serialized in Shueisha magazine Weekly Shōnen Jump between 1981 and 1988 for a total of 37 tankōbon volumes. A direct sequel titled Captain Tsubasa: World Youth was released between 1994 and 1997 by Shueisha. Others sequels were serialized in the same publisher Weekly Young Jump magazine since 2001: Road to 2002 (2001–2004), Golden-23 (2005–2008), and Kaigai Gekito-hen (2009–2012). From 2013 to 2019, Rising Sun was serialized in Shueisha's Grand Jump magazine. In 2020 it was transferred to Captain Tsubasa Magazine, where it was serialized till 2024.

== Volume list ==
=== Captain Tsubasa ===
No.	Japanese release date	Japanese ISBN
1	January 9, 1982	4-08-851281-2
2	May 10, 1982	4-08-851282-0
3	August 10, 1982	4-08-851283-9
4	November 10, 1982	4-08-851284-7
5	February 10, 1983	4-08-851285-5
6	May 10, 1983	4-08-851286-3
7	August 10, 1983	4-08-851287-1
8	November 10, 1983	4-08-851288-X
9	February 10, 1984	4-08-851289-8
10	June 8, 1984	4-08-851290-1
11	August 10, 1984	4-08-851291-X
12	November 9, 1984	4-08-851292-8
13	January 10, 1985	4-08-851293-6
14	April 10, 1985	4-08-851294-4
15	July 10, 1985	4-08-851295-2
16	October 10, 1985	4-08-851296-0
17	December 6, 1985	4-08-851297-9
18	January 10, 1986	4-08-851298-7
19	March 10, 1986	4-08-851299-5
20	May 9, 1986	4-08-851300-2
21	July 10, 1986	4-08-851871-3
22	September 10, 1986	4-08-851872-1
23	November 10, 1986	4-08-851873-X
24	January 9, 1987	4-08-851874-8
25	March 10, 1987	4-08-851875-6
26	May 8, 1987	4-08-851876-4
27	July 10, 1987	4-08-851877-2
28	September 10, 1987	4-08-851878-0
29	November 10, 1987	4-08-851879-9
30	January 8, 1988	4-08-851880-2
31	March 10, 1988	4-08-851881-0
32	May 10, 1988	4-08-851882-9
33	July 8, 1988	4-08-851883-7
34	September 9, 1988	4-08-851884-5
35	November 10, 1988	4-08-851885-3
36	January 10, 1989	4-08-851886-1
37	March 10, 1989	4-08-851887-X

=== World Youth ===
No.	Japanese release date	Japanese ISBN
1	December 1994	4-08-871770-8
2	March 1995	4-08-871854-2
3	May 1995	4-08-871855-0
4	July 1995	4-08-871856-9
5	September 1995	4-08-871857-7
6	November 1995	4-08-871858-5
7	January 1996	4-08-871859-3
8	March 1996	4-08-871860-7
9	May 1996	4-08-872261-2
10	July 1996	4-08-872262-0
11	September 1996	4-08-872263-9
12	November 1996	4-08-872264-7
13	January 1997	4-08-872265-5
14	March 1997	4-08-872266-3
15	May 1997	4-08-872267-1
16	July 1997	4-08-872268-X
17	September 1997	4-08-872269-8
18	November 1997	4-08-872270-1

=== Road to 2002 ===
No.	Japanese release date	Japanese ISBN
1	June 2001	4-08-876167-7
2	September 2001	4-08-876202-9
3	December 2001	4-08-876244-4
4	March 24, 2002	4-08-876278-9
5	May 22, 2002	4-08-876294-0
6	August 24, 2002	4-08-876333-5
7	November 24, 2002	4-08-876368-8
8	February 24, 2003	4-08-876402-1
9	May 24, 2003	4-08-876443-9
10	August 24, 2003	4-08-876487-0
11	November 24, 2003	4-08-876525-7
12	January 24, 2004	4-08-876565-6
13	April 19, 2004	4-08-876596-6
14	June 18, 2004	4-08-876617-2
15	August 19, 2004	4-08-876656-3

=== Golden 23 ===
No.	Japanese release date	Japanese ISBN
1	February 17, 2006	4-08-877037-4
Prologue: Germany Dream; Goal 1: "Oath for the Gold Medal" (金メダルへの誓い, "Kinmedaru he no Chikai"); Goal 2: "Start of Survival" (サバイバルの始まり, "Sabaibaru no Hajimari"); Goal 3: "Turning Back to the Tide" (劣勢をはねかえせ!!, "Ressei o Hanekaese!!"); Goal 4: "A Risky Gamble" (危険すぎる賭け, "Kiken Sugiru Kake"); Goal 5: "The Start Of A Legend" (伝説の幕開け, "Densetsu no Makuake"); Goal 6: "Battle for Pride 2 on 2" (プライドを懸けた2on2, "Puraido o Kake ta 2 on 2"); Goal 7: "Stop The Futsal Combi!!" (フットサルコンビを止めろ!!, "Futtosaru Konbi o Tomero!!")
2	May 19, 2006	4-08-877080-3
Goal 8: "The Camp's Battle For Pride" (プライドを懸けた合宿, "Puraido o Kaketa Gasshuku"); Goal 9: "Guardian Deity vs Futsal Combi" (守護神vsフットサルコンビ, "Shugojin vs Futtosaru Konbi"); Goal 10: "Heated Battle for Survival" (熾烈なるサバイバル, "Shiretsu Naru Sabaibaru"); Goal 11: "Next Age - Japan's Challenge" (次世代・日本代表の挑戦, "Jisedai.Nippon Daihyō no Chōsen"); Goal 12: "Loss Time Attack Defense!!" (ロスタイムの攻防!!, "Rosu Taimu no Kōbō!!"); Goal 13: "Burning Weed Spirit!!" (熱き雑草魂!!, "Atsuki Zassō Tamashii!!"); Goal 14: "First Step To The Gold Medal" (金メダルへの第一歩, "Kinmedaru he no Daīppo"); Goal 15: "Unexpected Happiness" (思いがけぬ幸せ, "Omoigake nu Shiawase"); Goal 16: "Clash Before The Decisive Battle" (決勝戦の激突, "Kesshō sen no Gekitotsu"); Goal 17: "Excessively Dangerous Two Top" (危険すぎるツートップ, "Kiken Sugiru Tsū Toppu")
3	July 19, 2006	4-08-877109-5
Goal 18: "Unexpected Defense" (予想外の守り, "Yosō Gai no Mori"); Goal 19: "3M Are Attacking" (3Mが攻める!!, "3M ga Semeru!!"); Goal 20: "Misaki's Decision" (岬の決意, "Misaki no Ketsui"); Goal 21: "Attack Spun By Dreams!!" (夢を紡ぐ一撃!!, "Yume o Tsumugu Ichigeki!!"); Goal 22: "Hidden Resolve" (秘めたる覚悟, "Hime Taru Kakugo"); Goal 23: "Raging Counterattack" (怒濤の反撃!!, "Dotō no Hangeki!!"); Goal 24: "Regret Able Exit" (無念の退場, "Munen no Taijō"); Goal 25: "Heartbreaking Decision" (苦渋の決断, "Kujū no Ketsudan"); Goal 26: "Disappearing Ball" (消えたボール!!, "Kieta Bōru!!"); Goal 27: "Falcon Descending From The Sky" (舞い降りたハヤブサ!!, "Maiori ta Hayabusa!!")
4	October 19, 2006	4-08-877156-7
Goal 28: "Unbelievable Sight" (信じられぬ光景, "Shinji Rare nu Kōkei"); Goal 29: "Unexpected Conversion!!" (驚異のコンバート!!, "Kyōi no Konbāto!!"); Goal 30: "Blooming Possibility" (開花した可能性!!, "Kaika Shi ta Kanōsei!!"); Goal 31: "Dramatic Departure" (船出を飾る勝利, "Funade o Kazaru Shōri"); Goal 32: "Rumor From Germany" (ドイツからの噂, "Doitsu Kara no Uwasa"); Goal 33: "Search For The Golden Warrior" (黄金戦士を探して, "Ōgon Senshi o Sagashi te"); Goal 34: "Goal for You" (ゴールへの誓い, "Gōru he no Chikai"); Goal 35: "Blessing Performance" (祝福のゴール!!, "Shukufuku no Gōru!!"); Goal 36: "Another Surprise!!" (サプライズ再び!!, "Sapuraizu Futatabi!!"); Goal 37: "Miraculous Body Faculties!!" (驚異の身体能力, "Kyōi no Shintai Nōryoku")
5	January 19, 2007	978-4-08-877197-7
Goal 38: "Why I Can't Lose" (負けられない対決!!, Make Rare nai Taiketsu!!); Goal 39: "Concealed Abilities" (不敵なる宣言, Futeki Naru Sengen); Goal 40: "Eagles Rain!!" (イーグルス襲来!!, Īgurusu Shūrai!!); Goal 41: "Explosion!! New Secret Super Technique!" (GK同士の狙い, GK Dōshi no Nerai); Goal 42: "Boiling Hungry Spirits" (沸き立つハングリー精神!!, Wakitatsu Hangurī Seishin!!); Goal 43: "New One On One" (未体験の一対一!!, Mi Taiken no Ichitai Ichi!!); Goal 44: "Just for Victory" (ただ勝利のために, Tada Shōri no Tame ni); Goal 45: "Invitation To Return" (再起への誘い, Saiki he no Izanai); Goal 46: "Can't Let Go This Dream" (夢を追い続けて, Yume o oi Tsuduke te); Goal 47: "Ace's Decision" (エースに託せ!! 扉, Ēsu ni Takuse!! Tobira)
6	April 19, 2007	978-4-08-877247-9
Goal 48: "Sticking To One On One" (一対一へのこだわり, "Ichitai Ichi e no Kodawari"); Goal 49: "Why You Can't Win" (勝利できぬ理由, "Shōri Deki nu Riyū"); Goal 50: "Counterattack's Roar" (反撃への咆哮, "Hangeki e no Hōkō"); Goal 51: "Determined Charge!!" (執念の一撃!!, "Shūnen no Ichigeki!!"); Goal 52: "Tenacious Dive!!" (決死のダイブ!!, "Kesshi no Daibu!!"); Goal 53: "Growth Of Team Spirit" (新たな合言葉, "Arata na Aikotoba"); Goal 54: "Fresh Start!!" (新たなるスタート!!, "Arata Naru Sutāto!!"); Goal 55: "Rivals Come Across!!" (負けられぬ再戦!!, "Make Rare nu Saisen!!"); Goal 56: "The Tactician's Objective" (策士の狙い, "Sakushi no Nerai"); Goal 57: "Another Surprise Attack!!" (兄の決意, "Kei no Ketsui")
7	August 17, 2007	978-4-08-877313-1
Goal 58: "Unexpected And Clever Play!!" (予測不能の頭脳プレー!!, "Yosoku Funō no Zunō Purē!!"); Goal 59: "Signal Fire Of The Counterattack" (繁劇の狼煙（のろし）, "Hangeki no Noroshi (Noroshi)"); Goal 60: "Attacking Ace!!" (譲れぬ気迫!!, "Yuzure nu Kihaku!!"); Goal 61: "Spirited Dive!!" (気迫のダイブ!!, "Kihaku no Daibu!!"); Goal 62: "Finish Defending Even At 10!!" (10人で守り切れ!!, "10 Nin de Mamori Kire!!"); Goal 63: "Marvelous Aerial Clash!!" (驚異の空中激突!!, "Kyōi no Kūchū Gekitotsu!!"); Goal 64: "Last 5 Minutes Of Attack Defense" (残り5分の攻防, "Nokori 5 Bunno Kōbō"); Goal 65: "Get 3 Points At All Costs" (執念の突進!!, "Shūnen no Tosshin!!"); Goal 66: "Strange Combi Play!!" (規格外コンビプレイ!!, "Kikaku Gai Konbi Purei!!"); Goal 67: "Will To Win" (優勝への決意, "Yūshō e no Ketsui")
8	October 19, 2007	978-4-08-877337-7
Goal 68: "Decisive Determination" (不退転の決意, "Futaiten no Ketsui"); Goal 69: "Dangerous First Play" (危険なファーストプレイ, "Kiken na Fāsuto Purei"); Goal 70: "Talent Coming To Light!!" (覚醒した才能!!, "Kakusei shi ta Sainō !!"); Goal 71: "All Rounder's True Worth" (オールラウンダーの真骨頂, "Ōruraundā no Shinkocchō"); Goal 72: "Reaction to the Asian Preliminaries" (アジア予選への手応え, "Ajia Yosen e no Tegotae"); Goal 73: "Trial For The Championship" (エースの復帰, "Ēsu no Fukki"); Goal 74: "Impatient To Win" (勝利への焦り, "Shōri e no Aseri"); Goal 75: "Ace's Return!!" (復活の舞台, "Fukkatsu no Butai"); Goal 76: "Revival Of The Golden Combi!!" (沸き立つスタジアム, "Wakitatsu Sutajiamu"); Goal 77: "Footsteps Towards The Decisive Game" (試練の始まり, "Shiren no Hajimari"); Goal 78: "To Their Respective Top" (終わりなき挑戦!!, "Owari Naki Chōsen!!")
9	January 18, 2008	978-4-08-877378-0
Goal 79: "Outbreak of the Shock" (衝撃の開戦!!, "Shōgeki no Kaisen!!"); Goal 80: "Too Severe Reality" (厳しすぎる現実, "Kibishi Sugiru Genjitsu"); Goal 81: "Heroic Decision" (壮絶な決意, "Sōzetsu na Ketsui"); Goal 82: "Union Intensified" (深まる団結力, "Fukamaru Danketsu Ryoku"); Goal 83: "Match on the Verge of the Cliff" (ガケッぷちの戦い, "Gakep Puchi no Tatakai"); Goal 84: "Doubt Of The Commander" (指揮官の迷い, "Shiki Kan no Mayoi"); Goal 85: "A Method Not Yet Known" (未知なる一手, "Michi Naru Itte"); Goal 86: "Frim Secret Plan" (手堅き秘策, "Tegataki Hisaku"); Goal 87: "Buying Time Too Plainly" (露骨過ぎる時間稼ぎ, "Rokotsu Sugiru Jikan Kasegi"); Goal 88: "Counterattack's Bullet Clear" (反撃の弾丸クリア!!, "Hangeki no Dangan Kuria !!")
10	April 18, 2008	978-4-08-877425-1
Goal 89: "Determined For The Sacrifice!!" (捨て身の決意!!, "Sutemi no Ketsui!!"); Goal 90: "Kind Hesitation" (優しさ故の迷い, "Yasashi sa Yue no Mayoi"); Goal 91: "Last Flight!!" (最後のフライト!!, "Saigo no Furaito!!"); Goal 92: "Hard Price To Pay" (先制点の代償, "Sensei ten no Daishō"); Goal 93: "Offense And Defense From The Front" (真正面からの攻防, "Masshōmen Kara no Kōbō"); Goal 94: "Spirit That Isn't Running Away" (逃げない心, "Nige nai Kokoro"); Goal 95: "Evolving Secrets" (勝利への奥義, "Shōri e no Ōgi"); Goal 96: "Fly!! Wakado Style Combi!!" (飛翔!! 若堂流コンビ!!, "Hishō!! Waka Dō Ryū Konbi!!"); Goal 97: "The Falcon Flap His Wings Towards The World!!" (世界へ羽ばたく隼!!, "Sekai e Habataku Hayabusa!!"); Goal 98: "Inherited Spirit" (受け継いだ魂, "Uketsui da Tamashii")
11	July 18, 2008	978-4-08-877474-9
Goal 99: "Turbulent Flow" (不穏な流れ, "Fuon na Nagare"); Goal 100: "Time Passing By Too Fast" (早過ぎる時間経過, "Haya Sugiru Jikan Keika"); Goal 101: "Judge Who Changes Fate!!" (運命を変えるジャッジ!!, "Unmei o Kaeru Jajji!!"); Goal 102: "Unyielding Spirit" (折れない心, "Ore nai Kokoro"); Goal 103: "Being Oneself And Not Anybody" (誰でもない自分へ, "Dare Demo nai Jibun e"); Goal 104: "Reproduction of The Legend!!" (伝説の再現!!, "Densetsu no Saigen!!"); Goal 105: "The Third Man" (第三の男, "Sai San no Otoko"); Goal 106: "For Just One More Goal" (ただ一点のために, "Tada Ichi Ten no Tame ni"); Goal 107: "Small Soldier's Willpower" (小兵の意地, "Kohyō no Iji"); Goal 108: "Birth of the New Futsal Combi" (新フットサルコンビ誕生!!, "Shin Futtosaru Konbi Tanjō!!")
12	October 17, 2008	978-4-08-877527-2
Goal 109: "Intention To Enforce His Will!!" (貫き通す意思!!, "Tsuranukitōsu Ishi!!"); Goal 110: "Kind And Strong" (優しさと強さ, "Yasashi sa to Tsuyo sa"); Goal 111: "Linked Spirit Combi Play" (魂が結ぶコンビプレー, "Tamashii ga Musubu Konbi Purē"); Goal 112: "Road To Madrid" (マドリッドへの道, "Madoriddo e no Michi "); "Wish for Peace in Hiroshima (part 1)" (WISH FOR PEACE IN HIROSHIMA〈前編〉, "WISH FOR PEACE IN HIROSHIMA (Zenpen)"); "Wish for Peace in Hiroshima (part 2)" (WISH FOR PEACE IN HIROSHIMA〈後編〉, "WISH FOR PEACE IN HIROSHIMA (Kōhen)"); Extra: "I Am Misaki Taro" (ボクは岬太郎, "Boku wa Misaki Tarō")

=== Kaigai Gekito-hen ===
==== In Calcio ====
No.	Japanese release date	Japanese ISBN
1	May 19, 2010	978-4-08-877725-2
01. "Clash in Foreign Country!!" (異国での激突!, "Ikoku de no Gekitotsu!"); 02. "Respective Pride" (それぞれのプライド!!, "Sorezore no Puraido!!"); 03. "Never Ending Progress" (終わらない成長, "Owara nai Seichō"); 04. "Facing the Risk!!" (リスクを冒せ!!, "Risuku o Okase!!"); 05. "Unshakable Strength!!" (揺るがぬ強さ, "Yuruga nu Tsuyo sa"); 06. "The End Of The Frustrations" (挫折の果てに, "Zasetsu no Hate ni"); 07. "Well Trained Balance" (鍛え上げたバランス, "Kitaeage ta Baransu"); 08. "Further Progress!!" (さらなる成長!!, "Saranaru Seichō!!"); 09. "Changing The Flow" (変化する流れ, "Henka Suru Nagare"); 10. "Decided To Take Part In The Attack!!" (決意の攻撃参加!!, "Ketsui no Kōgeki Sanka!!"); 11. "Signal Fire of The Counterattack!!" (反撃の狼煙!!, "Hangeki no Noroshi!!")
2	May 19, 2010	978-4-08-877870-9
12. "Fighting Spirit Won't Yield" (譲らぬ闘志, "Yuzura nu Tōshi"); 13. "Aoi Non Stop!!" (葵ノンストップ!!, "Aoi Nonsutoppu!!"); 14. "The Last Goal" (最後の一点, "Saigo no Ichi Ten"); 15. "Belief" (信じる心, "Shinjiru Kokoro"); 16. "Offense And Defense Aren't Ceding" (譲らぬ攻防, "Yuzura nu Kōbō"); 17. "Our Giocatori Promise" (ジョカトーレ達の約束, "Jokatōre Tachi no Yakusoku"); 18. "A General Offensive with All of Their Might" (渾身の総攻撃, "Konshin no Sō Kōgeki"); 19. "Last Choice" (最後の選択, "Saigo no Sentaku"); 20. "Last Chance" (ラストチャンス!!, "Rasuto Chansu!!"); 21. "Last Play!!" (ラストプレイ!!, "Rasuto Purei!!"); 22. "Ace's Proof" (エースの証明, "Ēsu no Shōmei"); 23. "Roaring Lightning!!" (うなる稲妻!!, "Unaru Inazuma!!"); 24. "New Sunrise" (新たな日の出, "Arata na Hinode")

==== En La Liga ====
No.	Japanese release date	Japanese ISBN
3	June 4, 2010	978-4-08-877877-8
01. "Premises of Fierce Fight" (激闘の予感, "Gekitō no Yokan"); 02. "A Man Showing Miracles" (奇跡をみせる男, "Kiseki o Miseru Otoko"); 03. "Completely Away" (絶対的アウェイ, "Zettai Teki Awei"); 04. "White Terror" (白い恐怖, "Shiroi Kyōfu"); 05. "Lightning Speed!!" (電光石火!!, "Denkōsekka!!"); 06. "Relentless Attack Defense" (譲らぬ攻防, "Yuzura nu Kōbō"); 07. "Unpredictable Shot!" (予測外シュート!!, "Yosoku Gai Shūto!!"); 08. "Third Time Lucky" (三度目の正直!!, "San Dome no Shōjiki!!"); 09. "Double Volante!" (Wボランチ!!, "W Boranchi!!")
4	October 19, 2010	978-4-08-879041-1
10. "There is a Glorious Goal!" (予感, "Yokan"); 11. "Inner Voice" (内なる声, "Nai Naru koe"); 12. "Ideal Soccer" (理想のサッカー, "Risō no Sakkā"); 13. "Prologue To Counterattack" (反撃への序章!!, "Hangeki e no Joshō!!"); 14. "Amazing Physical Abilities" (驚異の身体能力, "Kyōi no Shintai Nōryoku"); 15. "Progress of Each Rival" (成長しあうライバル, "Seichō Shi au Raibaru"); 16. "Decided Not To Step Back!" (下がらぬ決意!!, "Sagara nu Ketsui!!"); 17. "The Highest 2 on 1" (最高の2対1!!, "Saikō no 2 Tai 1!!"); 18. "Fragrance of Daner" (危険な香り, "Kiken na Kaori"); 19. "The Stage For 2 People" (二人の舞台, "Ni Nin no Butai")
5	January 19, 2011	978-4-08-879090-9
20. "Men Leading Each Other" (導き合う男たち, "Michibiki au Otoko Tachi"); 21. "Those Possessed By Soccer" (サッカーに魅入られた者たち, "Sakkā ni Mīrareta Mono Tachi"); 22. "Submarine Assault" (サブマリン急襲!!, "Sabumarin Kyūshū!!"); 23. "Resilient Captainship" (屈せぬキャプンテンシー, "Kusse nu Kyapuntenshī"); 24. "The Critical Offense Defense" (瀬戸際の攻防, "Setogiwa no Kōbō"); 25. "Desire Towards Soccer" (サッカーへの想い, "Sakkā he no Omoi"); 26. "Increasing Team Strength!!" (高まるチーム力!!, "Takamaru Chīmu Ryoku"); 27. "Getting Closer To an Ideal Form" (近づく理想形, "Chikaduku Risō Gata"); 28. "King of Soccer" (王者のサッカー, "Ōja no Sakkā"); 29. "Raging Wave of Attack" (怒涛の攻め, "Dotō no Seme")
6	May 19, 2011	978-4-08-879128-9
30. "Foreseeing Each Other" (読みあい!!, "Yomi Ai!!"); 31. "Goal To Goal" (ゴールトゥゴール, "Gōru tu Gōru"); 32. "Miraculous Riposte" (奇跡の応酬!!, "Kiseki no Ōshū !!"); 33. "The Passion That Did Not Disappear" (消えることなき情熱, "Kieru Koto Naki Jōnetsu"); 34. "Don't Lose To Heavy Pressure" (負けられぬ重圧, "Makerarenu Jūatsu"); 35. "Entrusing Hopes" (託された思い, "Takusareta Omoi"); 36. "Impact And Fantasy" (衝撃とファンタジー, "Shōgeki to Fantajī"); 37. "Invisible Power" (見えない力, "Mienai Chikara"); 38. "Tenacity For Victory" (勝利への執念, "Shōri e no Shūnen"); 39. "Long Distance Counter!!" (長距離カウンター!!, "Chō Kyori Kauntā!!")
7	September 16, 2011	978-4-08-879197-5
40. "The First Effort" (初めての努力, "Hajimete no Doryoku"); 41. "Getting Over The Wall" (乗り越えた壁, "Norikoeta Kabe"); 42. "Don't Feel Depressed" (くじけぬ気持ち, "Kujikenu Kimochi"); 43. "To A Best In The World's Match" (世界一への試練, "Sekai Ichi e no Shiren"); 44. "The Light To Reversal" (逆転への光, "Gyakuten e no Hikari"); 45. "Growing Impatient" (つのる焦り, "Tsunoru Aseri"); 46. "Assuming a Risk" (リスクを背負え, "Risuku o Seoe"); 47. "The Last Attack" (最後の攻撃!!, "Saigo no Kōgeki!!"); 48. "The Set-up Was Ready" (用意された布石, "Yōi Sareta Fuseki"); 49. "2 Falcons" (2羽の鷹, "2-wa no Taka")
8	May 18, 2012	978-4-08-879347-4
50. "Tenacious Shot" (執念のシュート, "Shūnen no Shūto"); 51. "Former Self" (かつての自分, "Katsute no Jibun"); 52. "Last Play!!" (ラストプレイ!!, "Rasuto Purei!!"); 53. "Innocent Blow!!" (無心の一撃!!, "Mushin no Ichigeki!!"); 54. "Aftertaste Of The Fierce Fight" (激戦の余韻!!, "Gekisen no Yoin!!"); 55. "Way to Victory" (優勝への道, "Yūshō e no Dō"); 56. "Teacher and Student Confrontation!!" (師弟対決!!, "Shitei Taiketsu!!"); 57. "First Place Battle Line" (首位戦線, "Shui Sensen"); 58. "Conclusion Angel's Impact" (天使の衝撃, "Tenshi no Shōgeki")

=== Rising Sun ===
No.	Japanese release date	Japanese ISBN
1	May 19, 2014	978-4-08-880130-8
Chapter 1-7
2	November 4, 2014	978-4-08-880241-1
Chapter 8-15
3	February 4, 2016	978-4-08-880351-7
Chapter 16-24
4	July 4, 2016	978-4-08-880741-6
Chapter 25-33
5	February 3, 2017	978-4-08-881013-3
Chapter 34-42
6	June 2, 2017	978-4-08-881230-4
Chapter 43-50
7	October 4, 2017	978-4-08-881234-2
Chapter 51-58
8	April 4, 2018	978-4-08-881459-9
Chapter 59-66
9	June 4, 2018	978-4-08-881555-8
Chapter 67-73
10	January 4, 2019	978-4-08-881711-8
Chapter 74-81
11	June 6, 2019	978-4-08-881873-3
Chapter 82-89
12	October 4, 2019	978-4-08-882091-0
Chapter 90-97
13	April 3, 2020	978-4-08-882293-8
Chapter 98-102 +3 extra chapters
14	October 2, 2020	978-4-08-882502-1
Chapters 103-111
15	April 2, 2021	978-4-08-882662-2
Chapters 112-120
16	December 3, 2021	978-4-08-882898-5
Chapters 121-127
17	August 4, 2022	978-4-08-883220-3
Chapters 128-133
18	April 4, 2023	978-4-08-883536-5
Chapters 134-140
19	January 4, 2024	978-4-08-883764-2
Chapters 141-146
20	June 4, 2024	978-4-08-884060-4
Chapters The Final 1-9 + extra
