= List of Fist of the North Star chapters =

Volume 9 of Fist of the North Star: Master Edition, published by Gutsoon.

The manga Hokuto no Ken (known as Fist of the North Star in its English editions) by Buronson and Tetsuo Hara was originally published by Shueisha in the magazine Weekly Shōnen Jump from 1983 to 1988, and the series was subsequently reprinted in 27 collected editions (tankōbon) under the Jump Comics imprint. During the 1990s, Shueisha reprinted Hokuto no Ken in 15 hardcover aizōban editions, as well as 15 corresponding economy-sized bunko editions.

After Tetsuo Hara left Shueisha, other companies started reprinting the manga under license from Hara's new employer Coamix. A 31-volume tankōbon was published by Shinchosha under the Bunch World imprint from 2001 to 2002, followed by a 12-volume conbini comic edition published by Tokuma Shoten under the Tokuma Favorite Comics imprint in 2004. A 14-volume Kanzenban edition was published by Shogakukan in 2006 under the Big Comics Selection imprint, featuring the original water-colored artwork and opening pages from the Weekly Shōnen Jump serialization. It has also been released in 27-volume e-book edition.

In 2013, the kyūkyokuban or "Extreme Edition" began publication by Tokuma Shoten under the "Zenon Comics DX" imprint. This 18-volume edition, in addition to featuring all the pages from both, the tankōbon and kanzenban edition, has new cover artwork by Tetsuo Hara himself for each volume, as well as a new 30th anniversary-themed chapter titled Hokuto no Ken: Last Piece, which is included in Volume 11.

Viz Communications published the first sixteen chapters of Fist of the North Star in English as an eight-issue monthly comic in 1989, which were later reprinted in a single graphic novel collection in 1995. During that same year, Viz resumed publication of the series as a monthly comic until 1997, lasting eighteen issues (spanning chapters 17–44), which were subsequently reprinted in three additional graphic novels. The license was later acquired by Gutsoon! Entertainment, which published a new translation of the series in the form of a "Master Edition" featuring newly colorized artwork and retained the original right-to-left orientation of the art, as well as new cover artwork by Tetsuo Hara from the fourth volume and onward. Fist of the North Star: Master Edition was published from 2002 to 2003, lasting only nine volumes, due to Gutsoon!'s withdrawal from the North American market. In 2020, Viz Media announced that they reacquired Fist of the North Star license and would republish the title under the Viz Signature Edition line, with the first volume released on June 15, 2021, and the eighteenth and last on September 23, 2025.

== Japanese volumes ==
=== Tankōbon edition (Jump Comics) ===
No.	Japanese release date	Japanese ISBN
1	March 9, 1984	4-08-851661-3
001. "A Cry from the Heart" (心の叫び, Kokoro no Sakebi); 002. "When the Fury of Heaven Strikes" (怒り天を衝く時!, Ikari Ten o Tsuku Toki!); 003. "Secret Technique! Zankaiken" (秘拳!残悔拳, Hiken! Zankaiken); 004. "King Retaliates" (KINGの逆襲, Kingu no Gyakushū); 005. "To Southern Cross!!" (サザンクロスへ!!, Sazankurosu e!!); 006. "Fateful Reunion!" (宿命の再会!, Shukumei no Saikai!); 007. "The Mad Killer" (狂乱の殺人者, Kyōran no Satsujinsha); 008. "Flames of Devotion" (執念の炎, Shūnen no Honō)
2	June 8, 1984	4-08-851662-1
009. "Devotion and Fury" (執念と怒り, Shūnen to Ikari); 010. "When a Great Star Falls" (巨星堕つ時, Kyosei Otsu Toki); 011. "Encounter at the Oasis!" (オアシスでの出会い!, Oashisu no Deai!); 012. "Execution of the Devil!" (悪魔の処刑!, Akuma no Shokei!); 013. "Mad Sarge" (マッド軍曹, Maddo Gunsō); 014. "The Ultimate Assassin" (究極の暗殺者, Kyūkyoku no Ansatsusha); 015. "Boomerang of Death" (死のブーメラン, Shi no Būmeran); 016. "Tears That Break Ambition" (野望を断つ涙!, Yabō o Tatsu Namida!); 017. "A Messenger from Home" (故郷からの使者, Furusato kara no Shisha)
3	September 10, 1984	4-08-851663-X
018. "For a Sip of Water" (一口の水のために…, Hitokuchi no Mizu no Tame ni...); 019. "Village Abandoned by God" (神に捨てられた村, Kami no Suterareta Mura); 020. "Rage!! To the Ends of Hell!!" (怒り!地獄の果てまで!!, Ikari! Jigoku no Hate Made!!); 021. "Death to the Mad Dogs!" (狂犬ども死すべし!, Kyōken Domo Shisubeshi!); 022. "A Challenge to the Devils!" (悪魔たちへの挑戦状!, Akuma-tachi e no Chōsenjō!); 023. "Devil's Awakening!" (悪魔の目覚め!, Akuma no Mezame!); 024. "Indra Reborn!!" (闘神の化身!!, Indora no Keshin!!); 025. "No Deceiving the Reaper" (死神は欺けない, Shinigami wa Asamukenai); 026. "The Man of Nanto!" (南斗の男!, Nanto no Otoko!)
4	December 7, 1984	4-08-851664-8
027. "Two Malefics!" (ふたつの凶星!, Futatsu no Kyōsei!); 028. "Men Who Have Seen Tears!!" (涙をみた男たち!!, Namida o Mita Otoko-tachi!!); 029. "Death to Gunroken!" (死すべし群狼拳!, Shisubeshi Gunrō-Ken!); 030. "You Are a Woman!" (おまえは女!, Omae wa Onna!); 031. "Blood-Soaked Trap!!" (血ぬられた罠!!, Chinurareta Wana!!); 032. "The Lingering Scent of Death!" (ただよう死の臭い!, Tadayō Shi no Nioi!"); 033. "Mamiya's Gamble!" (マミヤの賭け!, Mamiya no Kake!); 034. "Ghastly Tactics!" (恐るべき策略!, Osorubeki no Sakuryaku no Kan!"); 035. "Rock-Slicing Fist!" (岩を裂く拳!, Iwa o Saku Kobushi!)
5	March 8, 1985	4-08-851665-6
036. "Who Laughs Last?!" (最後に笑う者!?, Saigo ni Warau Mono!?); 037. "Time Limit of Death" (死のタイムリミット, Shi no Taimu Rimitto); 038. "Evil Glare!" (凶悪なるまなざし!, Kyōakunaru Manazashi!); 039. "Journey to a Deadly Battle!" (死闘への旅立ち!, Shitō e no Tabidachi); 040. "Young Sacrifice!!" (幼き犠牲!!, Osanaki Ikenie!!); 041. "Shifu's Prophecy!" (師父の予言!, Shifu no Kanegoto!); 042. "Ruthless Law" (非情の掟, Hijō no Okite); 043. "The Blood of Formidable Friends!" (強敵たちの血の果てに!, Tomo-tachi no Chi no Hateni!); 044. "Four Strikes of Fury!!" (怒拳4連弾!!, Doken Yonrendan!)
6	June 10, 1985	4-08-851666-4
045. "Star of Turmoil" (乱を呼ぶ星, Ran o Yobu Hoshi); 046. "The Mad Fallen Angel!" (狂気の堕天使!, Kyōki no Daraku Tenshi!); 047. "Power Game of Death" (死のパワーゲーム, Shi no Pawā Gēmu); 048. "Tragic Reunion!" (悲劇の再会!!, Higeki no Saikai!!); 049. "Beneath a Tragic Star!" (悲劇の星の下に!, Higeki no Hoshi no Shita ni!); 050. "Behind the Mask!" (仮面の裏!, Kamen no Ura!); 051. "The Sad Genius!" (悲しき天才!, Kanashiki Tensai!); 052. "Ravenous Wasteland!" (飢えた荒野!, Katsueta Kōya!); 053. "The Men Who Create Legends!" (伝説をつくる男たち!, Densetsu o Tsukuru Otoko-tachi!)
7	September 10, 1985	4-08-851667-2
054. "Open the Gate of Death!" (死の門をあけろ!!, Shi no Mon o Akero!!); 055. "Sorrowful Gamble!" (哀しき賭け!, Kanashiki Kake!); 056. "Graves of the Saviors" (救世主たちの墓, Kyūseishu-tachi no Haka); 057. "Laid to Rest in an Unmarked Grave!" (眠れ墓標なき墓に!, Nemure Bohyō-naki Haka ni!); 058. "Footsteps of Terror!" (恐怖の足音!, Kyōfu no Ashioto!); 059. "The Quiet Giant!" (静かなる巨人!, Shizukanaru Kyojin!); 060. "Hokuto Ujoken!" (北斗有情拳!, Hokuto Ujō-Ken!); 061. "The Lost Man of Hokuto" (失われた北斗の男, Ushinawareta Hokuto no Otoko); 062. "The Blue Glow of Shichosei!" (死兆星の蒼光!, Shichōsei no Sōkon!)
8	November 8, 1985	4-08-851668-0
063. "The Little Hero!" (小さな勇者!, Chiisai na Yūsha"); 064. "The Looming Demonic Beast!" (迫りくる野獣!, Serikuru Yajū!); 065. "The Malefic One Shines!" (凶星炸裂!, Kyōsei Sakuretsu!); 066. "The Illusionary Malefic Fists!" (見えざる魔拳!, Miezaru Maken!); 067. "A Warning from the Dead!" (死者の警告!, Shisha no Keikoku!); 068. "Fate That Calls for Blood!" (血を呼ぶ宿命!, Chi o Yobu Shukumei!); 069. "A Moment of Respite!" (今一瞬の命を!, Ima Isshun no Inochi o!); 070. "Like Calm Waters" (静水のように, Seisui no Yōni); 071. "Free Me from the Hikobaku!" (その秘孔縛を解け!, Sono Hikō Baku o Toke!)
9	January 10, 1986	4-08-851669-9
072. "The Never-Ending Struggle" (永遠の死闘!, Eien no Shitō!); 073. "Savage! Dog Master!!" (暴虐! 狗法眼!!, Bōgyaku! Kuhōgen!!); 074. "Shichosei Shines Above Mamiya!" (死兆星マミヤの頭上に!, Shichōsei Mamiya no Shijō ni!); 075. "The Dreadful Crest!" (凶悪なる紋章!, Kyōakunaru Monshō!); 076. "Nanto Rokusei Shines!!" (南斗六星光る!!, Nanto Roku Sei Hikaru!!); 077. "The Edge of Despair!!" (絶望の淵!!, Zetsubō no Fuchi!!); 078. "The Crimson Fangs of Yosei!" (妖星の赤き牙!, Yōsei no Aki Kiba!); 079. "The Final Burst of Flame!" (最期の炎!, Saigo no Honō!); 080. "When Nanto Rokuseihen Falls" (南斗六聖拳堕ちる時, Nanto Roku Seiken Ochiru Toki)
10	April 10, 1986	4-08-851670-2
081. "The Waterfowl Flies No More!" (水鳥は飛ばず!; Mizudori wa Tobazu!); 082. "Final Farewell!" (永遠の別れ!, Eien no Wakare!); 083. "Nanto in Turmoil!" (狂乱の南斗!, Kyōran no Nanto!); 084. "The Furious Dance of Nanto Hakuroken!" (南斗白鷺拳! 乱舞!!; Nanto Hakuro Ken! Ranbu!!); 085. "The Star of Hope Awakens!" (めざめる仁星!, Mezameru Jinsei!); 086. "The Emperor of Nanto!" (南斗の帝王!, Nanto no Teiō!); 087. "The Emperor's Smile!" (帝王の微笑!, Teiō no Bijō!); 088. "Shiba Shines Bright!" (鮮やかなるシバ!, Azayakanaru Shiba!); 089. "The Valiant Leader Sheds No Tears!" (闘将は泣かず!, Tōshō wa Nakazu!)
11	July 10, 1986	4-08-851671-0
090. "The Tragic Star of Hope!" (悲しき仁星!, Kanashiki Jinsei!); 091. "The Star of Hokuto Quakes!" (北斗の星 騒ぐ!, Hokuto no Hoshi Sawagu!); 092. "The Path of Fate!" (宿命の道!, Shukumei no Michi!); 093. "A Cruel Miracle!" (非情の奇跡!, Hijō no Kiseki!); 094. "Because of Love!" (愛ゆえに!, Ai Yueni!); 095. "Grave Marker of Love!" (愛の墓標!, Ai no Bohyō!); 096. "Heaven-Shattering Fist!!" (天砕く拳!!, Ten Kudaku Kobushi!!); 097. "Fallen Because of Love!" (愛深きゆえに堕つ!, Ai Fukaku Yueni Otsu!); 098. "No Death for Kenoh!" (拳王は死なず!, Ken-ō wa Shinazu!)
12	September 10, 1986	4-08-851672-9
099. "Enduring Soul" (捨てえぬ心, Sute enu Kokoro no kan"); 100. "That Tragic Day!" (あの日よりその悲劇は!, Ano Hi Yori Sono Higeki Wa!); 101. "A Promise from the Past!" (遠い誓い!, Tooi Chikai!); 102. "Awakening Blood!" (めざめる血!, Mezameru Chi!); 103. "The Final Farewell!" (永訣の時!, Eiketsu no Toki!); 104. "A Bond so Strong, So Tragic!" (絆熱く哀しく!, Kizuna Atsuku Kanashiku!); 105. "My Star is Tenro!" (わが星は天狼の星!, Waga Hosho wa Tenrō no Hoshi!); 106. "The Price of Loyalty!" (忠誠の代償!, Chūsei no Daishō!); 107. "The Testament of Living!" (人間の証!, Ningen no Akashi!)
13	November 10, 1986	4-08-851673-7
108. "Tears of the Tenro!" (天狼の涙!, Tenrō no Namida!); 109. "The Celestial Crown's Messenger!" (天帝よりの使者!, Tentei Yori no Shisha!); 110. "Nanto Finally Rises!!" (南斗ついに起つ!!, Nanto Tsuini Tatsu!!); 111. "The Light that Summons Hokuto!" (北斗を呼ぶ光, Hokuto o Yobu Hikari); 112. "The Flames of Devotion!" (執念の炎!, Shūnen no Honō!); 113. "Like a Drifting Cloud!" (流れる雲のように!, Nagareru Kumo no Yōni"); 114. "Soar, Cloud!" (翔べよ雲!, Tobeyo Kumo!); 115. "Surging Cloud!" (湧きたつ雲!, Wakitatsu Kumo!); 116. "The Unconventional Fist!" (妖気の邪拳!, Yōki no Jaken!)
14	January 9, 1987	4-08-851674-5
117. "Simply for Love!" (ただ愛のために!, Tada Ai no Tameni!); 118. "There is no Death for Me!" (われ死を知らず!, Ware Shi o Shirazu!); 119. "The Secret Fist of Sorrow!" (哀しみの秘法拳!, Kanashimo no Hihouken!); 120. "The Fading Cloud!" (流れ去る雲よ!, Nagare Saru Kumo yo!); 121. "To the General!" (いざ将の下へ!, Iza Shou no Shita e!); 122. "Distant Desire!" (はるかなる想い!, Harukanaru Omoi!); 123. "The Time Has Come!" (その時は きた!, Sono Toki wa Kita!); 124. "Torrent of Blood! (血の奔流!, Chi no Honryuu!); 125. "The Trap of Fate!" (運命の罠!, Unmei no Wana!)
15	March 10, 1987	4-08-851675-3
126. "Sacrifice to the Demon King!" (魔王への犠牲!, Maou e no Gisei!); 127. "The Return of the Devil!" (鬼神となりて!, Kijin Tonari De!); 128. "The Unclouded Fist!" (拳に曇り許さず!, Kobushi ni Kumori Bakasazu!); 129. "Glorious in Defeat!" (栄光ある敗者!, Eikou Aru Haisha!); 130. "Spirit Beyond Body!" (肉体を越える魂!, Nikutai o Koeru Damashii!); 131. "Bloodstained Heart!" (心を血に染めて!, Kokoro o Chi ni Somete!); 132. "Forsaking Love!" (あえて愛を絶つ!, Aete Ai o Tatsu!); 133. "Crossroads of Fate!" (宿命の岐路, Shukumei no Kiro); 134. "Strike the Battle Ki!" (闘気を撃つ!, Touki o Utsu!)
16	May 8, 1987	4-08-851676-1
135. "Blood-Soaked Conqueror!" (血に染まる覇王!, Chi ni Somaru Haou!"); 136. "Farewell, My Greatest Rival!" (さらば強敵よ!, Saraba Tomo Yo!); 137. "The Cry of the Young Wolf!" (若き狼の叫び!, Wakaki Ookami no Yobi!); 138. "Birth of a New Legend!" (新伝説創造!, Shin Densetsu Souzou!); 139. "Return to Life!" (生きてふたたび!, Ikite Futatabi!); 140. "The Marvelous Ein!" (驚異のアイン!, Kyoui no Ain!); 141. "Defiant Smile!" (不敵なる微笑!, Futekinaru Bijou!); 142. "Ein's Girl! (アインの女!, Ain no Onna!); 143. "The Blue Wolves of Rebellion!" (反逆の蒼き狼たち!, Hangyaku no Wakaki Ookami-tachi!)
17	July 10, 1987	4-08-851677-X
144. "A Wanted Man by Choice!" (あえて賞金首に!, Aete Shoukin Kubi Ni!); 145. "The Golden Falco!" (金色のファルコ!, Ougon no Faruko!); 146. "The Golden Assassin!" (黄金の刺客!, Kogane no Shikaku!); 147. "Nanto Rises!" (たちあがる南斗!, Tachiagaru Nanto!); 148. "The Mask Sheds No Tears!!" (仮面は涙せず!, Kamen wa Namisezu!); 149. "The Brave General Cries No More!" (涙枯れし猛将!, Namida Kareshi Moushou!); 150. "Canal of Drifting Death!" (死を流す運河!, Shi o Nagasu Unga!); 151. "Spear of Rage!" (怒りの刃!, Ikari no Yaiba!); 152. "The Black Shadow That Beckons Death" (死を呼ぶ黒き影, Shi o Yobu Kuroki Kage)
18	September 10, 1987	4-08-851678-8
153. "All to the Heavens!" (すべてを天へ!, Subete o Ten e!); 154. "Heaven-Splitting Battle!" (天を割る死闘!, Ten o Waru Shitou!); 155. "Reunion in Hell!" (地獄での再会!, Jigoku de no Saikai!); 156. "Two Celestial Monarchs!" (ふたりの天帝!, Futari no Tentei!); 157. "Wipe Away Their Blood!" (やつらの血をぬぐえ!!, Yatsura no Chi o Nugue!!); 158. "A Promise to Asuka!" (アスカとの約束!, Asuka to no Yakusoku!); 159. "Tears of a Warrior!!" (武人の涙!!, Bujin no Namida!!); 160. "The Eternal Soul of a Father!!" (永遠なる父の魂!!, Eien-naru Chichi no Damashii!!); 161. "Dangerous Prey!" (危険な獲物!, Kiken na Emono!)
19	November 10, 1987	4-08-851679-6
162. "Onward! To the Land of Asuras!" (いざ! 修羅の国へ!!, Iza! Shura no Kuni e!!); 163. "The Way of Asura! Ninkon Yohajin!" (修羅道! 忍棍妖破陣!!, Shuradou! Ninkon Youha Jin"); 164. "With Pride!" (誇りとともに!, Hokori Totomoni!); 165. "Death Devourers!" (死を喰らうヤツら!!, Shi o Kurau Yatsura!!); 166. "The Mask of Ambition!" (野望の仮面!, Yabou no Kamen!); 167. "The Rakshasa of Darkness!" (闇の羅刹!, Yami bo Rasetsu!); 168. "Prologue to the Asura Hunt!" (修羅狩り序章, Shura Kari Joshou); 169. "The Deadliest Fist on Earth!" (地上最凶拳!, Chijou Saikyou Ken!); 170. "Ambition Ablaze!" (白熱せる野望!, Hakunetsuseru Yabou!)
20	January 8, 1988	4-08-851680-X
171. "The Devil's Fist Reigns!" (君臨せる魔拳!, Kunrinseru Maken!); 172. "A Call From Afar!" (はるかなる呼び声!, Harukanaru Yobi Koe!); 173. "For a Loved One!" (愛しき者のために!, Itoshikimono no Tame ni!); 174. "The Legend of Fate!" (宿命の伝説!, Shukumei no Densetsu!); 175. "The Successor of the Legend!" (伝説を継ぐ者!, Densetsu o Tsugumono!); 176. "The Legend of Raoh Lives On!" (ラオウ伝説走る!, Raou Densetsu Hashiru!); 177. "Blazing Fate! (燃えさかる宿命!", Moesakaru Shukumei!); 178. "The Wretched Rise Up!" (ボロ蜂起す!!, Boro Hachi Okosu!!); 179. "Forgotten Love!" (もどりこぬ愛!!, Modorikonu Ai!!)
21	March 10, 1988	4-08-851824-1
180. "Raging Wind of Death!" (死風さかまく!, Shifuu Sakamaku!); 181. "The Crazed Demon Lord!" (狂える魔王!, Kurueru Maou!); 182. "Quaking Demon Aura!" (震える魔気!, Furueru Ma Ki!); 183. "The Legendary Bloodline!" (伝説の血脈!!, Densetsu no Kechimyaku!!); 184. "Muso Tensei! Trounced!" (玉砕!無想転生!!, Gyokusai! Musou Tensei!!); 185. "Repentant Jukei!" (ジュウケイ無残!, Juukei Muzan!); 186. "Cruel Reunion!" (無情の再会!, Mujou no Saikai!); 187. "The Phantom Demon!" (幻影の魔人!!, Gen-ei no Majin!!); 188. "Calamitous Reunion!" (非情の再会!!, Higeki no Saikai!!)
22	May 10, 1988	4-08-851825-X
189. "Hyo Enraged!" (ヒョウ狂乱!!, Hyou Kyouran!!); 190. "Two Warriors Rise!" (両雄たつ!, Ryuuyuu Tatsu!); 191. "Brothers Cry No More!" (涙かれし兄弟!!, Namida Kareshi Kyoudai!!); 192. The Graveyard of Ryuken!" (琉拳の墓場!!, Ryuuken no Hakaba!!); 193. "Dreadful Blood Spilled!" (凄血散る!, Sei Chi Chiru!); 194. "Dreadful Blood Revived!" (よみがえる凄血!, Yomigaeru Sei Chi!); 195. "Fools!" (愚か者!!, Orokamono!!); 196. "The Wicked Beast!" (悪の妄獣!!, Aku no Boujuu!!); 197. "Rin's Dilemma!" (リン無情!!, Rin Mujou!!)
23	July 8, 1988	4-08-851826-8
198. "Tears of the Goddess!" (女神の涙!!, Megami no Namida!!); 199. "Held in Gentle Arms!" (優しき腕の中で!, Yasashiki Ude no Naka de!); 200. "The Love that Sleeps!" (眠れる愛!, Nemureru Ai!); 201. "The Sorrowful Sacred Pillar!" (哀しき聖塔!, Kanashiki Seitou!); 202. "Scars of Hatred!" (憎しみの傷跡!, Nikushimi no Kizuato!); 203. "A Parting of Fresh Blood" (訣別の鮮血!, Ketsubetsu no Senketsu!); 204. The Conqueror's Request!" (覇王の遺言!, Haou no Igen!); 205. Dying with Glory!" (栄光のうちに死せ!, Eikou no Uchi ni Shise!); 206. Abominable Blood" (忌むべき血なれど, Imubeki Chinaredo)
24	September 9, 1988	4-08-851827-6
207. The Birth of Hokuto Shinken!" (北斗神拳創造!, Hokuto Shinken Sousou!); 208. A War Between Cruel Fists!" (戦場の凄拳!, Senjou no Seiken!); 209. The Exhaustion of a Tenacious Hellfire!" (執念の業火果つ!, Shuunen no Kouga Hatsu!); 210. Farewell to My Loved Ones!!" (さらば愛しき者たちよ!, Saraba Aishikimono-tachi yo!); 211. A New Hope!" (新しき希望!, Atarashiki Kibou!); 212. An Oath of Fists and Blood!" (血と拳の誓い!, Chi to Kobushi no Chikai!); 213. The End of the Wolf Age!" (狼の時代の終焉!, Ookami no Jidai no Shuuen!); 214. The Laughing Hyena!" (笑うハイエナ!, Warau Haiena!); 215. The Wolf Lives!!" (狼は死なず!!, Ookami wa Shinazu!!)
25	November 10, 1988	4-08-851828-4
216. A Malicious Arrow!" (怨念の矢!, Onnen no Ya!); 217. Like a Rat!" (ドブネズミの如く!, Dobunezumi no Kodoku!); 218. The Princess From Sava!" (サヴァの王女!, Sava no Oujo!); 219. A Hero Arrives!" (英雄あり!, Eiyuu Ari!); 220. A Wish Which Spits Out Blood!" (血を吐く願い!, Chi o Haku Negai!); 221. The Unintersecting Three Imperial Stars!" (交わらぬ三帝星!, Majiwaranu San Teisei!); 222. A Prologue to Destruction" (滅びの序章, Horobi no Joshou); 223. A Violent Warrior!" (凄絶なる強者!, Seizetsunaru Kyousha!); 224. Caught in a Cruel Fist!!" (非情の拳にこめて!!, Hijou no Kobushi ni Komete!!); 225. A Death Suited For a King!" (王として死す!, Ou Toshite Shisu!)
26	January 10, 1989	4-08-851829-2
226. Like Father, Like Son!" (父よ子よ!, Chichi yo Ko Yo!); 227. A Grand Death!" (大いなる死よ!, Dainaru Shi yo!); 228. Fanatics!" (狂信者たち!, Kyoushinsha-tachi!); 229. A Familiar Sacred Image" (顔なき聖像, Kaonaki Seizou); 230. At the End of Love" (盲愛の果てに, Mouai no Hateni); 231. A Promise Drenched in Tears!" (涙にぬれた約束!, Namida ni Nureta Yakusoku!); 232. One Motivated by Hatred!" (憎悪すべきもの!, Souo Subeki Mono!); 233. God Becomes Merciless" (無慈悲なる神, Mujihinaru Kami); 234. The Shadow of the Conqueror!" (覇王の影!, Haou no Kage!); 235. The Unbreakable Fist!!" (拳にて砕けるにあらず!!, Kobushi nite Kudakeru ni Arazu!!)
27	March 10, 1989	4-08-851830-6
236. A Man Driven By Death..." (死すために男は…, Shisu Tameni Otoko wa..); 237. A Faraway Love..." (愛すれど遠く…, Ai Suredo Tooku...); 238. The Miraculous Light!" (奇跡の光!, Kiseki no Hikari!); 239. His Powerful Fists!!" (その力強き拳は!!, Sono Chikarazuyoki Kobushi Wa!!); 240. For the One Who Gave Their Love!" (愛をくれた者のために!, Ai o Kuretamono no Tameni!); 241. The Boy From That Day" (あの日の少年, Ano Hi no Shounen); 242. A Yearning to be Together!" (あこがれとともに!, Akogare Totomoni!); 243. The Ultimate Superhuman Returns!!" (究極超人復活!!, Kyuukyoku Choujin Fukkatsu!!); 244. A Sacrifice Without Regret!!" (死を賭して なお悔いず!!, Shi o Toshite Nao Kuizu!!); 245. Farewell to My Loved Ones...And Into the Desertland..." (さらば愛しき者たちよ…そして荒野へ…, Saraba Aishikimono-tachi yo...Soshite Kouya e...)

=== Aizōban edition ===
Vol.	Release date	ISBN
01	1991-8-21	4-08-782601-5
02	1991-9-20	4-08-782602-3
03	1991-10-18	4-08-782603-1
04	1991-11-20	4-08-782604-X
05	1991-12-13	4-08-782605-8
06	1992-1-20	4-08-782606-6
07	1992-2-20	4-08-782607-4
08	1992-3-19	4-08-782608-2
09	1992-4-20	4-08-782609-0
10	1992-5-20	4-08-782610-4
11	1992-6-19	4-08-782611-2
12	1992-7-20	4-08-782612-0
13	1992-8-20	4-08-782613-9
14	1992-9-18	4-08-782614-7
15	1992-10-20	4-08-782615-5

=== Bunkoban edition (Shueisha Bunko) ===
Vol.	Release date	ISBN
01	1997-5-16	4-08-617283-6
02	1997-5-16	4-08-617284-4
03	1997-7-18	4-08-617285-2
04	1997-7-18	4-08-617286-0
05	1997-9-18	4-08-617287-9
06	1997-9-18	4-08-617288-7
07	1997-11-18	4-08-617289-5
08	1997-11-18	4-08-617290-9
09	1998-1-16	4-08-617291-7
10	1998-1-16	4-08-617292-5
11	1998-3-18	4-08-617293-3
12	1998-3-18	4-08-617294-1
13	1998-5-15	4-08-617295-X
14	1998-5-15	4-08-617296-8
15	1998-5-15	4-08-617297-6

=== Kanzenban edition (Big Comics Special) ===
Vol.	Release date	ISBN	Chapters
01	2006-01-30	4-09-180240-0	1–16
02	2006-01-30	4-09-180243-5	17–33
03	2006-02-28	4-09-180267-2	34–50
04	2006-02-28	4-09-180268-0	51–67
05	2006-03-15	4-09-180280-X	68–84
06	2006-03-15	4-09-180308-3	85–101
07	2006-04-27	4-09-180517-5	102–119
08	2006-04-27	4-09-180518-3	120–136
09	2006-05-30	4-09-180536-1	137–154
10	2006-06-30	4-09-180564-7	155–172
11	2006-07-28	4-09-180762-3	173–190
12	2006-08-30	4-09-180763-1	191–208
13	2006-09-29	4-09-180776-3	209–226
14	2006-10-30	4-09-181008-X	227–245

=== Kyūkyokuban edition (Zenon Comics DX) ===
Vol.	Release date	ISBN
01	2013-09-20	4-19-980151-0
02	2013-09-20	4-19-980152-9
03	2013-10-19	4-19-980166-9
04	2013-10-19	4-19-980167-7
05	2013-11-20	4-19-980174-X
06	2013-11-20	4-19-980175-8
07	2013-12-20	4-19-980181-2
08	2013-12-20	4-19-980182-0
09	2014-1-20	4-19-980189-8
10	2014-1-20	4-19-980190-1
11	2014-4-19	4-19-980206-1
12	2014-4-19	4-19-980207-X
13	2014-5-20	4-19-980213-4
14	2014-5-20	4-19-980214-2
15	2014-6-20	4-19-980218-5
16	2014-6-20	4-19-980219-3
17	2014-7-19	4-19-980225-8
18	2014-7-19	4-19-980226-6

== English volumes ==
=== Viz Graphic Novels edition ===
Volume	Viz Graphic Novel Title	Release date	ISBN	Contents
01	Fist of the North Star	April 1995	1-56931-031-9	Part 1, Issues 1–8 (Chapters 1–16)
02	Fist of the North Star: Night of the Jackal	September 1997	1-56931-186-2	Part 2, Issues 1–7 (Chapters 17–27)
03	Fist of the North Star: Southern Cross	December 1997	1-56931-200-1	Part 2, Issues 7–8; Part 3, Issues 1–5 (Chapters 28–35)
04	Fist of the North Star: Blood Brothers	May 1998	1-56931-258-3	Part 4, Issues 1–7 (Chapters 36–44)

=== Raijin Comics edition ===
Volume	Release date	ISBN	Chapters
01	2003-01-28	0-9725037-0-6	1–8
02	2003-02-25	0-9725037-1-4	9–17
03	2003-03-18	0-9725037-2-2	18–26
04	2003-05-14	0-9725037-3-0	27–34
05	2003-07-26	0-9725037-4-9	35–42
06	2003-11-11	0-9725037-5-7	43–50
07	2003-11-25	1-932454-11-X	51–58
08	2004-02-18	1-932454-20-9	59–66
09	2004-05-19	1-932454-27-6	67–74
10	Unpublished	1-932454-36-5	N/A

=== Viz Signature edition ===
Volume	Release date	ISBN	Chapters
01	2021-06-15	978-1-9747-2156-6	1–13
02	2021-09-21	978-1-9747-2157-3	14–27
03	2021-12-21	978-1-9747-2158-0	28–40
04	2022-03-15	978-1-9747-2159-7	41–54
05	2022-06-28	978-1-9747-2160-3	55–67
06	2022-09-27	978-1-9747-2161-0	68–80
07	2022-12-27	978-1-9747-2162-7	81–94
08	2023-03-28	978-1-9747-2163-4	95–108
09	2023-06-27	978-1-9747-2164-1	109–122
10	2023-09-26	978-1-9747-2165-8	123–136
11	2023-12-26	978-1-9747-2166-5	137–146
12	2024-03-26	978-1-9747-2167-2	147–160
13	2024-06-25	978-1-9747-2168-9	161–174
14	2024-09-24	978-1-9747-2169-6	175–188
15	2024-12-24	978-1-9747-2170-2	189–202
16	2025-03-25	978-1-9747-2169-6	203–216
17	2025-06-24	978-1-9747-2172-6	217–230
18	2025-09-23	978-1-9747-2173-3	231–245
