= List of Kinnikuman volumes =

The Japanese manga series Kinnikuman was written and illustrated by Yudetamago. The series follow Kinnikuman, a superhero who must win a wrestling tournament to retain the title of prince of Planet Kinniku.

The manga was first published in Shueisha's magazine Weekly Shōnen Jump as a two one-shots in December 1978 and March 1979. The regular serialization started with the publication of the first chapter in the May 28, 1979, issue of Weekly Shōnen Jump, where it was serialized weekly until its conclusion in March 1987.

The 387 chapters were collected and published into 36 tankōbon volumes by Shueisha starting on December 20, 2002; the last volume was released on October 2, 2009. The manga was adapted into a 137-episode anime series produced by Toei Animation that aired in Japan on Nippon Television (NTV) from April 3, 1983, to October 1, 1986. Additionally, a 46-episode series was produced by Toei and aired on NTV from October 6, 1991, to September 27, 1992.

After 24 years, the series returned to be published on November 28, 2011, in Shū Play News, Shueisha's web version of Weekly Playboy. The collected editions for the revived serial resumed the numbering from the original series, starting with the 37th volume published on January 29, 2010. As of October 2, 2026, 94 volumes were released.

== Volume list ==
No.	Japanese release date	Japanese ISBN
1	February 15, 1980	978-4-08-851131-3
2	May 15, 1980	978-4-08-851132-0
3	July 15, 1980	978-4-08-851133-7
4	September 15, 1980	978-4-08-851134-4
5	December 15, 1980	978-4-08-851135-1
6	April 15, 1981	978-4-08-851136-8
7	September 15, 1981	978-4-08-851137-5
8	February 15, 1982	978-4-08-851138-2
9	July 15, 1982	978-4-08-851139-9
10	October 15, 1982	978-4-08-851140-5
11	February 15, 1983	978-4-08-851141-2
12	June 15, 1983	978-4-08-851142-9
13	September 15, 1983	978-4-08-851143-6
14	December 15, 1983	978-4-08-851144-3
15	March 15, 1984	978-4-08-851145-0
16	June 15, 1984	978-4-08-851146-7
17	September 15, 1984	978-4-08-851147-4
18	December 15, 1984	978-4-08-851148-1
19	February 15, 1985	978-4-08-851149-8
20	April 15, 1985	978-4-08-851150-4
21	July 15, 1985	978-4-08-851801-5
22	September 15, 1985	978-4-08-851802-2
23	December 15, 1985	978-4-08-851803-9
24	February 15, 1986	978-4-08-851804-6
25	April 15, 1986	978-4-08-851805-3
26	June 15, 1986	978-4-08-851806-0
27	August 15, 1986	978-4-08-851807-7
28	October 15, 1986	978-4-08-851808-4
29	December 10, 1986	978-4-08-851809-1
30	February 15, 1987	978-4-08-851810-7
31	April 15, 1987	978-4-08-851811-4
32	June 15, 1987	978-4-08-851812-1
33	August 15, 1987	978-4-08-851813-8
34	October 15, 1987	978-4-08-851814-5
35	December 9, 1987	978-4-08-851815-2
36	April 15, 1988	978-4-08-851816-9
37	January 29, 2010	978-4-08-874833-7
38	April 4, 2012	978-4-08-870448-7
39	June 4, 2012	978-4-08-870567-5
40	September 4, 2012	978-4-08-870579-8
41	December 4, 2012	978-4-08-870699-3
42	March 4, 2013	978-4-08-870722-8
43	July 1, 2013	978-4-08-870870-6
44	October 4, 2013	978-4-08-870882-9
45	January 4, 2014	978-4-08-880093-6
46	April 4, 2014	978-4-08-880122-3
47	July 4, 2014	978-4-08-880244-2
48	October 3, 2014	978-4-08-880122-3
49	December 29, 2014	978-4-08-880379-1
50	April 3, 2015	978-4-08-880406-4
51	July 3, 2015	978-4-08-880528-3
52	October 3, 2015	978-4-08-880545-0
53	January 4, 2016	978-4-08-880693-8
54	April 4, 2016	978-4-08-880694-5
55	July 4, 2016	978-4-08-880747-8
56	August 4, 2016	978-4-08-880772-0
57	December 2, 2016	978-4-08-880820-8
58	March 3, 2017	978-4-08-881044-7
59	June 2, 2017	978-4-08-881119-2
60	September 4, 2017	978-4-08-881263-2
61	December 29, 2017	978-4-08-881313-4
62	March 2, 2018	978-4-08-881376-9
63	June 4, 2018	978-4-08-881423-0
64	September 4, 2018	978-4-08-881615-9
65	December 4, 2018	978-4-08-881691-3
66	March 4, 2019	978-4-08-881779-8
67	May 2, 2019	978-4-08-881855-9
68	June 17, 2019	978-4-08-881848-1
69	November 29, 2019	978-4-08-882118-4
70	March 4, 2020	978-4-08-882271-6
71	June 4, 2020	978-4-08-882341-6
72	September 4, 2020	978-4-08-882414-7
73	January 4, 2021	978-4-08-882499-4
74	April 2, 2021	978-4-08-882621-9
75	July 2, 2021	978-4-08-882727-8
76	October 4, 2021	978-4-08-882814-5
77	January 4, 2022	978-4-08-882894-7
78	April 4, 2022	978-4-08-883094-0
79	August 4, 2022	978-4-08-883216-6
80	November 4, 2022	978-4-08-883308-8
81	March 17, 2023	978-4-08-883383-5
82	June 2, 2023	978-4-08-883625-6
83	September 29, 2023	978-4-08-883647-8
84	March 29, 2024	978-4-08-883730-7
85	July 4, 2024	978-4-08-884197-7
86	October 4, 2024	978-4-08-884308-7
87	January 4, 2025	978-4-08-884439-8
88	April 4, 2025	978-4-08-884482-4
89	September 4, 2025	978-4-08-884649-1
90	October 3, 2025	978-4-08-884772-6
91	January 5, 2026	978-4-08-884858-7
92	April 3, 2026	978-4-08-885063-4
93	July 3, 2026	978-4-08-885128-0
94	October 2, 2026	978-4-08-885224-9
