= List of highest-grossing adult animated films =

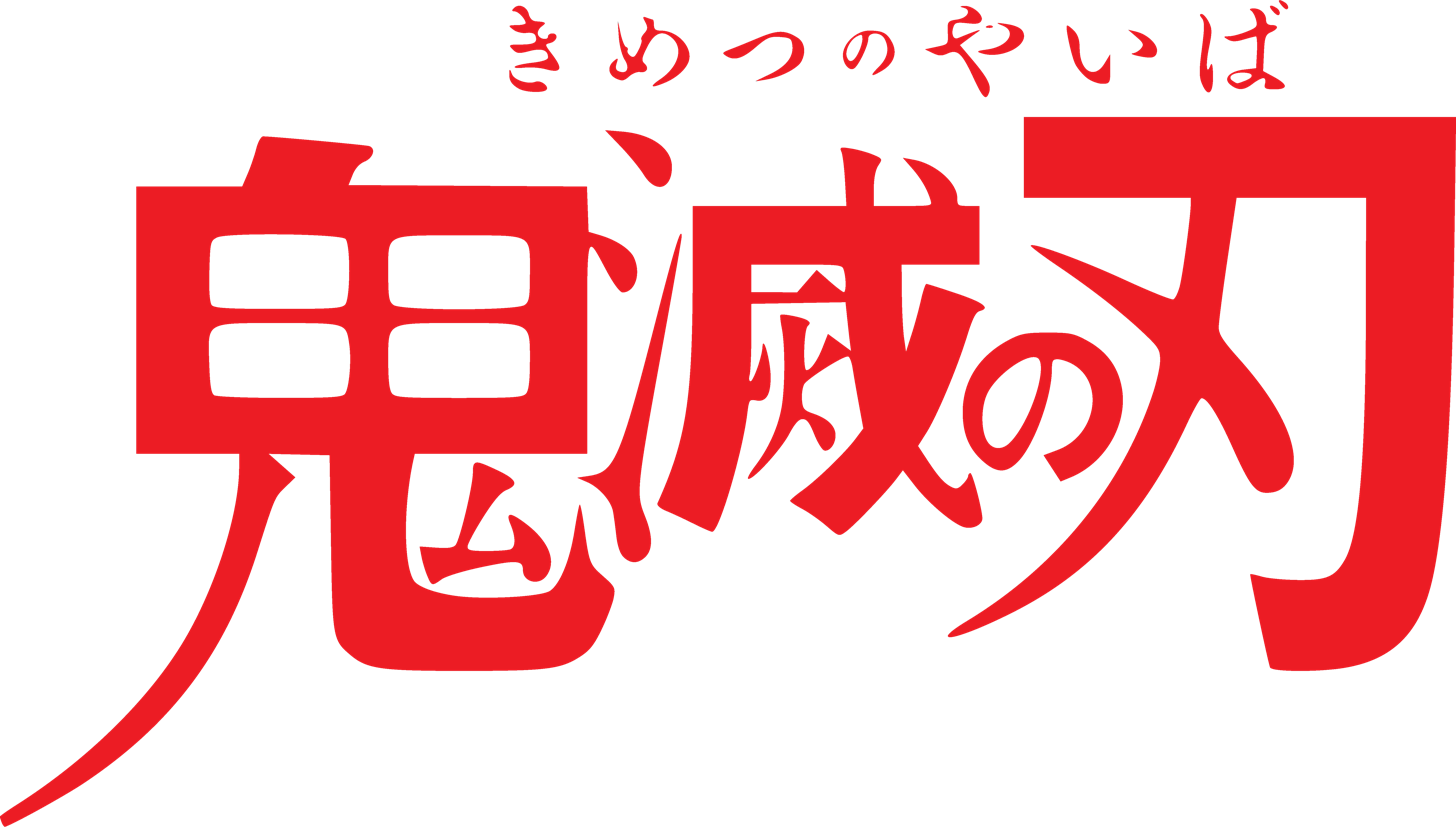
Demon Slayer: Kimetsu no Yaiba anime film series earned more than $1 billion of box-office gross internationally, the first R-rated animated film series to do so.

These are the following list of highest-grossing animated films primarily aimed for adult audiences. Each film is required to be either PG-13, R, NC-17 (successor to X-rated) or Unrated by the Motion Picture Association. Both PG-13 and R rating apply to the television equivalent of the Motion Picture Association such as TV-14 and TV-MA, which is also included but must be applied on the list.

Adult animated films achieved massive box-office success in Asian countries, primarily Japan. As such, Demon Slayer: Kimetsu no Yaiba anime film series is the highest-grossing R-rated animated film franchise, earned more than $1 billion of box-office gross internationally; Infinity Castle became the highest-grossing R-rated animated film of all time ahead its release. Chinese production Ne Zha and its sequel became the highest-grossing adult animated films.

== Highest-grossing adult animated films ==
Rank	Title	Country	Technique	Rating	Worldwide gross	Year	Ref(s)
1	Ne Zha 2	China	CGI	PG-13	$2,217,758,382	2025	
2	Demon Slayer: Kimetsu no Yaiba Infinity Castle	Japan	Traditional	R	$793,594,078	2025	
3	Ne Zha	China	CGI	TV-14	$742,718,496	2019	
4	The Simpsons Movie	US	Traditional	PG-13	$536,414,270	2007	
5	Demon Slayer: Kimetsu no Yaiba Mugen Train	Japan	Traditional	R	$512,704,063	2020	
6	The Boy and the Heron	Japan	Traditional	PG-13	$292,922,563	2023	
7	The First Slam Dunk	Japan	CGI	PG-13	$281,094,722	2023	
8	One Piece Film: Red	Japan	Traditional	PG-13	$245,270,000	2022	
9	Beowulf	US	CGI	PG-13	$196,393,745	2007	
10	Jujutsu Kaisen 0	Japan	Traditional	PG-13	$195,870,885	2021	
11	Weathering With You	Japan	Traditional	PG-13	$193,186,879	2019	
12	Chainsaw Man – The Movie: Reze Arc	Japan	Traditional	R	$181,115,803	2025	
13	Princess Mononoke	Japan	Traditional	PG-13	$169,785,629	1997	
14	Sausage Party	US, Canada	CGI	R	$140,705,322	2016	
15	The Wind Rises	Japan	Traditional	PG-13	$136,333,220	2013	
16	Detective Conan: The Fist of Blue Sapphire	Japan	Traditional	TV-14	$119,875,024	2019	
17	One Piece: Stampede	Japan	Traditional	TV-14	$94,684,223	2019	
18	Evangelion: 3.0+1.0 Thrice Upon a Time	Japan	Traditional	TV-MA	$92,000,000	2021	
19	Fritz the Cat	US	Traditional	X (TV-MA)	$90,000,000	1972	
20	Big Fish & Begonia	China	Traditional	PG-13	$85,557,721	2016	
21	Final Fantasy: The Spirits Within	US, Japan	CGI	PG-13	$85,131,830	2001	
22	One Piece Film: Z	Japan	Traditional	TV-14	$85,119,728	2012	
23	South Park: Bigger, Longer & Uncut	US	Traditional	R	$83,137,603	1999	
24	Tales from Earthsea	Japan	Traditional	PG-13	$75,500,000	2006	
25	Isle of Dogs	US, Germany	Stop-motion	PG-13	$72,988,064	2018	

== Highest-grossing adult animated films by animation type ==
=== Computer animation ===
Rank	Title	Country	Rating	Worldwide gross	Year	Ref(s)
1	Ne Zha 2	China	PG-13	$2,217,758,382	2025	
2	Ne Zha	China	TV-14	$742,718,496	2019	
3	The First Slam Dunk	Japan	PG-13	$279,892,281	2023	
4	Beowulf	US	PG-13	$196,393,745	2007	
5	Sausage Party	US, Canada	R	$140,705,322	2016	
6	Final Fantasy: The Spirits Within	US, Japan	PG-13	$85,131,830	2001	
7	White Snake	China	TV-14	$68,364,730	2019	
8	9	US	PG-13	$48,428,063	2009	
9	Mahavatar Narsimha	India	TV-14	$33,725,035	2025	
10	Huevos: Little Rooster's Egg-cellent Adventure	Mexico	PG-13	$25,892,561	2015	

=== Traditional animation (Japanese) ===
Rank	Title	Rating	Worldwide gross	Year	Ref(s)
1	Demon Slayer: Infinity Castle	R	$793,594,078	2025	
2	Demon Slayer: Mugen Train	R	$512,704,063	2020	
3	The Boy and the Heron	PG-13	$292,922,563	2023	
4	One Piece Film: Red	PG-13	$206,740,295	2022	
5	Jujutsu Kaisen 0	PG-13	$195,870,885	2021	
6	Weathering With You	PG-13	$193,186,879	2019	
8	Chainsaw Man – The Movie: Reze Arc	R	$181,115,803	2025	
7	Princess Mononoke	PG-13	$169,785,629	1997	
9	The Wind Rises	PG-13	$136,333,220	2013	
10	Detective Conan: The Fist of Blue Sapphire	TV-14	$119,875,024	2019	

=== Traditional animation (U.S and international) ===
Rank	Title	Country	Rating	Worldwide gross	Year	Ref(s)
1	The Simpsons Movie	US	PG-13	$536,414,270	2007	
2	Fritz the Cat	US	X	$90,000,000	1972	
3	Big Fish & Begonia	China	PG-13	$85,557,721	2016	
4	South Park: Bigger, Longer & Uncut	US	R	$83,137,603	1999	
5	Beavis and Butt-Head Do America	US	PG-13	$63,118,386	1996	
6	Loving Vincent	Poland, UK	PG-13	$44,077,249	2017	
7	The Bob's Burgers Movie	US	PG-13	$34,148,750	2022	
8	Persepolis	France, Iran	PG-13	$25,397,187	2007	
9	Eight Crazy Nights	US	PG-13	$23,833,131	2002	
10	Heavy Metal	US, Canada	R	$20,063,636	1981	

=== Stop-motion animation ===
Rank	Title	Country	Rating	Worldwide gross	Year	Ref(s)
1	Isle of Dogs	US, Germany	PG-13	$72,988,064	2018	
2	Wildwood †	US, United Kingdom, Canada	PG-13	$53,256,779	2026	
3	My Life as a Zucchini	Switzerland, France	PG-13	$10,245,743	2016	
4	Memoir of a Snail	Australia	R	$7,650,381	2024	
5	Anomalisa	US	R	$5,706,168	2015	
6	Mary and Max	Australia	TV-MA	$1,740,791	2009	
7	Junk Head	Japan	Unrated	$791,944	2021	
8	$9.99	Australia	R	$708,354	2008	
9	Mad God	US	Unrated	$329,009	2021	
10	Hell and Back	US	R	$157,768	2015	

== Highest-grossing adult animated films by rating ==
=== PG-13 or equivalent rating ===
Rank	Title	Country	Worldwide gross	Year	Ref(s)
1	Ne Zha 2	China	$2,244,267,207	2025	
2	Ne Zha	China	$742,718,496	2019	
3	The Simpsons Movie	US	$536,414,270	2007	
4	The Boy and the Heron	Japan	$292,922,563	2023	
5	The First Slam Dunk	Japan	$281,094,722	2023	
6	One Piece Film: Red	Japan	$206,740,295	2022	
7	Beowulf	US	$196,393,745	2007	
8	Jujutsu Kaisen 0	Japan	$195,870,885	2021	
9	Weathering With You	Japan	$193,186,879	2019	
10	Princess Mononoke	Japan	$169,785,629	1997	

=== R or equivalent rating ===
Rank	Title	Country	Worldwide gross	Year	Ref(s)
1	Demon Slayer: Infinity Castle	Japan	$793,594,078	2025	
2	Demon Slayer: Mugen Train	Japan	$512,704,063	2020	
3	Chainsaw Man – The Movie: Reze Arc	Japan	$181,115,803	2025	
4	Sausage Party	US, Canada	$140,705,322	2016	
5	Evangelion: 3.0+1.0 Thrice Upon a Time	Japan	$92,000,000	2021	
6	Fritz the Cat	US	$90,000,000	1972	
7	South Park: Bigger, Longer & Uncut	US	$83,137,603	1999	
8	Demon Slayer: To the Swordsmith Village	Japan	$59,554,259	2023	
9	Demon Slayer: To the Hashira Training	Japan	$50,439,672	2024	
10	Akira	Japan	$49,000,000	1988	

== Highest-grossing adult animated films by year ==
† indicates films playing in theaters around the world in the week commencing 30 October 2026.

Year	Title	Rating	Worldwide gross	Ref.
1969	A Thousand and One Nights	X	$2,611,318	
1970	Unknown	Unknown	Unknown	Unknown
1971	Unknown	Unknown	Unknown	Unknown
1972	Fritz the Cat	X	$90,000,000	
1973	Fantastic Planet	TV-14	$716	
1974	The Nine Lives of Fritz the Cat	R	$3,000,000	
1975	Unknown	Unknown	Unknown	Unknown
1976	Unknown	Unknown	Unknown	Unknown
1977	Wizards	TV-14	$9,000,000	
1978	The Mystery of Mamo	PG-13	$8,233,896	
1979	Galaxy Express 999	TV-14	¥4.2 billion (~$27,000,000)	
1980	Unknown	Unknown	Unknown	Unknown
1981	Heavy Metal	R	$20,063,636	
1982	The Plague Dogs	PG-13	£308,000	
1983	Unknown	Unknown	Unknown	Unknown
1984	Unknown	Unknown	Unknown	Unknown
1985	Unknown	Unknown	Unknown	Unknown
1986	Unknown	Unknown	Unknown	Unknown
1987	Unknown	Unknown	Unknown	Unknown
1988	Akira	R	$49,000,000	
1989	Unknown	Unknown	Unknown	Unknown
1990	Unknown	Unknown	Unknown	Unknown
1991	Robot Carnival	TV-14	$$10,642	
1992	Bebe's Kids	PG-13	$8,442,162	
1993	Unknown	Unknown	Unknown	Unknown
1994	Unknown	Unknown	Unknown	Unknown
1995	Ghost in the Shell	R	$2,287,714	
1996	Beavis and Butt-Head Do America	PG-13	$63,118,386	
1997	Princess Mononoke	PG-13	$169,785,629	
1998	Spriggan	R	$3,149,387	
1999	South Park: Bigger, Longer & Uncut	R	$83,137,603	
2000	Vampire Hunter D: Bloodlust	R	$151,086	
2001	Final Fantasy: The Spirits Within	PG-13	$85,131,830	
2002	Eight Crazy Nights	PG-13	$23,833,131	
2003	The Triplets of Belleville	PG-13	$14,776,760	
2004	Steamboy	PG-13	$18,900,000	
2005	Fullmetal Alchemist the Movie: Conqueror of Shamballa	PG-13	$11,000,000	
2006	Tales from Earthsea	PG-13	$75,500,000	
2007	The Simpsons Movie	PG-13	$536,414,270	
2008	Waltz with Bashir	R	$13,912,289	
2009	9	PG-13	$48,428,063	
2010	Bleach: Hell Verse	TV-14	$5,500,000	
2011	Fullmetal Alchemist: The Sacred Star of Milos	TV-MA	$7,579,282	
2012	One Piece Film: Z	TV-14	$85,119,728	
2013	The Wind Rises	PG-13	$136,333,220	
2014	Detective Conan: Dimensional Sniper	PG-13	$37,200,000	
2015	Detective Conan: Sunflowers of Inferno	PG-13	$60,985,674	
2016	Sausage Party	R	$140,705,322	
2017	Detective Conan: Crimson Love Letter	PG-13	$63,147,576	
2018	Detective Conan: Zero the Enforcer	PG-13	$108,105,223	
2019	Ne Zha	TV-14	$742,718,496	
2020	Demon Slayer: Kimetsu no Yaiba the Movie: Mugen Train	R	$512,704,063	
2021	Jujutsu Kaisen 0	PG-13	$195,870,885	
2022	The First Slam Dunk	PG-13	$279,892,281	
2023	The Boy and the Heron	PG-13	$292,922,563	
2024	Demon Slayer: Kimetsu no Yaiba – To the Hashira Training	R	$50,439,672	
2025	Ne Zha 2	PG-13	$2,217,758,382	
2026	Wildwood †	PG-13	$53,256,779	

== Highest-grossing adult animated films by timeline ==
At least four traditional animations and two computer animations held the records of the highest at any year:

Title	Established	Rating	Record-setting gross	Ref.
A Thousand and One Nights	1969	X	$2,601,662	
Fritz the Cat	1972	X	$90,000,000	
Princess Mononoke	1997	PG-13	$169,785,629	
The Simpsons Movie	2007	PG-13	$536,414,270	
Ne Zha	2019	TV-14	$742,718,496	
Ne Zha 2	2025	PG-13	$2,217,758,382	

== See also ==
- Adult animation
- List of adult animated films
- List of highest-grossing animated films
- List of highest-grossing anime films
- List of highest-grossing R-rated films
