= List of Demon Slayer: Kimetsu no Yaiba episodes =

Key visual for the series

Demon Slayer: Kimetsu no Yaiba is a Japanese anime television series based on Koyoharu Gotouge's Demon Slayer: Kimetsu no Yaiba manga series. The anime series adaptation by Ufotable was announced in Weekly Shōnen Jump in June 2018. The series aired from April 6 to September 28, 2019, on Tokyo MX, GTV, GYT, and BS11. Directed by Haruo Sotozaki, the anime is written by various Ufotable staff members and produced by Hikaru Kondo. The series' characters are designed by Akira Matsushima. The anime's music is composed by Yuki Kajiura and Go Shiina.

The series is licensed by Aniplex of America and streamed on Crunchyroll, Hulu and Netflix. AnimeLab is simulcasting the series in Australia and New Zealand. The first season contains 26 episodes, adapting from the first volume to the first chapters of the seventh.

Prior to airing, the first five episodes screened theatrically in Japan for two weeks from March 29, 2019, under the title Kimetsu no Yaiba: Kyōdai no Kizuna (鬼滅の刃 兄妹の絆). Aniplex screened the film at the Aratani Theatre in Los Angeles on March 31, 2019. Madman Entertainment through AnimeLab screened the film in select theaters in Australia on April 2, 2019. In July 2019, it was announced that the series' English dub would air on Adult Swim's Toonami programming block; the dub would premiere on October 13 of that same year. (Note: Adult Swim premiered the series on Saturday at 1:30 a.m. (25:30) ET/PT, which is effectively Sunday.)

A sequel film, entitled Demon Slayer: Kimetsu no Yaiba – The Movie: Mugen Train, premiered in Japan on October 16, 2020, with the staff and cast reprising their roles.

A second season, covering the "Entertainment District" arc, was announced on February 14, 2021, with the staff and cast from the first season and film returning. Sotozaki returned as director, with character designs by Matsushima and animation by Ufotable. In September 2021, it was announced that the second season would air for two cours. On September 25, following the Fuji Television broadcast of Mugen Train, it was announced that the "Entertainment District" arc would premiere on December 5, and be preceded by a television series recompilation of the "Mugen Train" arc as featured in the film that premiered on October 10, 2021.

At the end of the second-season finale, it was announced that a third season, covering the "Swordsmith Village" arc, was in production. It premiered on April 9, 2023, with a one-hour special, and ended on June 18 of that same year with a 70-minute special.

A fourth season, covering the "Hashira Training" arc, was announced following the end of the third-season finale. It premiered on May 12, 2024, with a one-hour episode. The season ended with a 60-minute episode, which aired on June 30 of the same year.

Following the finale of Hashira Training Arc, it was announced that the manga's "Infinity Castle" arc would be adapted into a film trilogy. Crunchyroll is releasing the films in theaters globally; it premiered in Japan on July 18, 2025.

== Series overview ==
Season	Episodes		Originally released		
Season	Episodes		First released	Last released	Network
1	26		April 6, 2019	September 28, 2019	Tokyo MX (Note: Season was simulcast on GTV, GYT, and BS11.)
2	18	7	October 10, 2021	November 28, 2021	Fuji Television
2	18	11	December 5, 2021	February 13, 2022	Fuji Television
3	11		April 9, 2023	June 18, 2023	Fuji Television
4	8		May 12, 2024	June 30, 2024	Fuji Television

== Episodes ==
=== Season 1: Tanjiro Kamado, Unwavering Resolve Arc (2019) ===
Story	Episode	Title	Directed by	Storyboarded by	Original release date (Note: Kimetsu no Yaiba premiered in Tokyo MX's Saturday 23:30 (11:30 p.m. JST) time slot.)	English air date
1	1	"Cruelty"; Transliteration: "Zankoku" (Japanese: 残酷)	Haruo Sotozaki	Haruo Sotozaki	April 6, 2019	October 13, 2019
2	2	"Trainer Sakonji Urokodaki"; Transliteration: "Sodate Urokodaki Sakonji" (Japanese: 育手・鱗滝左近次)	Haruo Sotozaki	Haruo Sotozaki	April 13, 2019	October 20, 2019
3	3	"Sabito and Makomo"; Transliteration: "Sabito to Makomo" (Japanese: 錆兎と真菰)	Shin'ya Shimomura	Haruo Sotozaki	April 20, 2019	October 27, 2019
4	4	"Final Selection"; Transliteration: "Saishū Senbetsu" (Japanese: 最終選別)	Shin'ya Shimomura	Toshiyuki Shirai	April 27, 2019	November 3, 2019
5	5	"My Own Steel"; Transliteration: "Onore no Hagane" (Japanese: 己の鋼)	Takashi Suhara	Takashi Suhara	May 4, 2019	November 10, 2019
6	6	"Swordsman Accompanying a Demon"; Transliteration: "Oni wo Tsureta Kenshi" (Japanese: 鬼を連れた剣士)	Jun'ichi Minamino	Jun'ichi Minamino	May 11, 2019	November 17, 2019
7	7	"Muzan Kibutsuji"; Transliteration: "Kibutsuji Muzan" (Japanese: 鬼舞辻 無慘)	Takahiro Majima & Masashi Takeuchi	Masashi Takeuchi	May 18, 2019	November 24, 2019
8	8	"The Smell of Enchanting Blood"; Transliteration: "Genwaku no Chi no Kaori" (Japanese: 幻惑の血の香り)	Hideki Hosokawa	Haruo Sotozaki	May 25, 2019 (Note: Episode 8 premiered prior to television airing at Madman Anime Festival Brisbane, Australia at 1:00 pm AEST (12:00 pm JST).)	December 8, 2019
9	9	"Temari Demon and Arrow Demon"; Transliteration: "Temari Oni to Yajirushi Oni" (Japanese: 手毬鬼と矢印鬼)	Shin'ya Shimomura	Haruo Sotozaki	June 1, 2019	December 15, 2019
10	10	"Together Forever"; Transliteration: "Zutto Issho ni Iru" (Japanese: ずっと一緒にいる)	Yūki Itō	Yoshiaki Kawajiri	June 8, 2019	January 5, 2020
11	11	"Tsuzumi Mansion"; Transliteration: "Tsuzumi no Yashiki" (Japanese: 鼓の屋敷)	Shūji Miyahara	Toshiyuki Shirai	June 15, 2019	January 12, 2020
12	12	"The Boar Bares its Fangs, Zenitsu Sleeps"; Transliteration: "Inoshishi wa Kiba wo Muki, Zenitsu wa Nemuru" (Japanese: 猪は牙を剥き、善逸は眠る)	Susumu Takeuchi	Masashi Takeuchi	June 22, 2019	January 19, 2020
13	13	"Something More Important Than Life"; Transliteration: "Inochi Yori Daiji-na Mono" (Japanese: 命より大事なもの)	Yūsuke Shibata	Haruo Sotozaki	June 29, 2019	January 26, 2020
14	14	"The House with the Wisteria Family Crest"; Transliteration: "Fuji no Hana no Kamon no Ie" (Japanese: 藤の花の家紋の家)	Haruo Sotozaki & Shūji Miyahara	Haruo Sotozaki	July 6, 2019	February 2, 2020
15	15	"Mount Natagumo"; Transliteration: "Natagumo-yama" (Japanese: 那多蜘蛛山)	Yūki Itō & Shinsuke Gomi	Yūki Itō	July 13, 2019	February 9, 2020
16	16	"Letting Someone Else Go First"; Transliteration: "Jibun Dewanai Dareka wo Mae e" (Japanese: 自分ではない誰かを前へ)	Ken Takahashi	Haruo Sotozaki	July 20, 2019	February 16, 2020
17	17	"You Must Master a Single Thing"; Transliteration: "Hitotsu no Koto Kiwamenuke" (Japanese: 一つのこと極め抜け)	Shūji Miyahara & Takuya Nonaka	Haruo Sotozaki	July 27, 2019	February 23, 2020
18	18	"A Forged Bond"; Transliteration: "Nisemono no Kizuna" (Japanese: 偽物の絆)	Akihiko Uda	Yoshiaki Kawajiri	August 3, 2019	March 1, 2020
19	19	"Hinokami" (Japanese: ヒノカミ)	Toshiyuki Shirai	Toshiyuki Shirai	August 10, 2019	March 8, 2020
20	20	"Pretend Family"; Transliteration: "Yose Atsume no Kazoku" (Japanese: 寄せ集めの家族)	Takashi Suhara	Takashi Suhara	August 17, 2019	March 15, 2020
21	21	"Against Corps Rules"; Transliteration: "Tairitsu Ihan" (Japanese: 隊律違反)	Takuya Nonaka	Takuya Nonaka & Toshiyuki Shirai	August 24, 2019	March 22, 2020
22	22	"Master of the Mansion"; Transliteration: "Oyakata-sama" (Japanese: お館様)	Yūki Itō	Takashi Suhara	August 31, 2019	March 29, 2020
23	23	"Hashira Meeting"; Transliteration: "Chūgō Kaigi" (Japanese: 柱合会議)	Ken Takahashi	Takashi Suhara	September 7, 2019	April 5, 2020
24	24	"Rehabilitation Training"; Transliteration: "Kinō Kaifuku Kunren" (Japanese: 機能回復訓練)	Shūji Miyahara & Akihiko Uda	Akihiko Uda & Haruo Sotozaki	September 14, 2019 (Note: Episode 24 premiered prior to television airing at Madman Anime Festival Melbourne, Australia at 1:30 pm AEST (12:30 pm JST).)	April 19, 2020
25	25	"Tsuguko, Kanao Tsuyuri"; Transliteration: "Tsuguko Kanao Tsuyuri" (Japanese: 継ぐ子 栗花落カナヲ)	Shin'ya Shimomura	Shin'ya Shimomura	September 21, 2019	April 26, 2020
26	26	"New Mission"; Transliteration: "Aratanaru Nimmu" (Japanese: 新たなる任務)	Haruo Sotozaki & Yūichi Terao	Haruo Sotozaki & Yūichi Terao	September 28, 2019	May 3, 2020

=== Season 2: Mugen Train Arc and Entertainment District Arc (2021–22) ===
Story	Episode	Title	Directed by	Storyboarded by	Original release date	English air date	Viewership rating
Mugen Train Arc (Note: Mugen Ressha-hen (無限列車編))
27	1	"Flame Hashira Kyojuro Rengoku"; Transliteration: "En Bashira Rengoku Kyōjurō" (Japanese: 炎柱・煉󠄁獄杏寿郎)	Shin'ya Shimomura	Takashi Suhara	October 10, 2021	November 12, 2023	10.0%
28	2	"Deep Sleep"; Transliteration: "Fukai Nemuri" (Japanese: 深い眠り)	Toshiyuki Shirai	Takahiro Miura	October 17, 2021	November 12, 2023	8.0%
29	3	"Should Have Been"; Transliteration: "Hontō nara" (Japanese: 本当なら)	Masashi Takeuchi	Takahiro Miura	October 24, 2021	November 19, 2023	7.0%
30	4	"Insult"; Transliteration: "Bujoku" (Japanese: 侮辱)	Masashi Takeuchi	Takahiro Miura	November 7, 2021	November 26, 2023	6.4%
31	5	"Move Forward!"; Transliteration: "Mae e!" (Japanese: 前へ！)	Toshiyuki Shirai	Takahiro Miura	November 14, 2021	December 3, 2023	5.7%
32	6	"Akaza" (Japanese: 猗窩座)	Hideki Hosokawa	Haruo Sotozaki	November 21, 2021	December 10, 2023	6.6%
33	7	"Set Your Heart Ablaze"; Transliteration: "Kokoro o Moyase" (Japanese: 心を燃やせ)	Haruo Sotozaki	Haruo Sotozaki	November 28, 2021	December 17, 2023	6.5%
Entertainment District Arc (Note: Yūkaku-hen (遊郭編))
34	8 (1) (Note: Season no. (Story arc no.))	"Sound Hashira Tengen Uzui"; Transliteration: "On Bashira Uzui Tengen" (Japanese: 音柱・宇髄天元)	Shin'ya Shimomura & Kei Tsunematsu	Takashi Suhara	December 5, 2021 (Note: Episode 34 is a 46 minute special.)	January 14, 2024	9.2%
35	9 (2)	"Infiltrating the Entertainment District"; Transliteration: "Yūkaku Sennyū" (Japanese: 遊郭潜入)	Takashi Suhara	Takashi Suhara	December 12, 2021	January 21, 2024	8.7%
36	10 (3)	"What Are You?"; Transliteration: "Nanimono?" (Japanese: 何者？)	Akihiko Uda	Takashi Suhara	December 19, 2021	January 28, 2024	8.5%
37	11 (4)	"Tonight"; Transliteration: "Kon'ya" (Japanese: 今夜)	Hideki Hosokawa	Takuya Nonaka & Haruo Sotozaki	December 26, 2021	February 4, 2024	7.4%
38	12 (5)	"Things Are Gonna Get Real Flashy!!"; Transliteration: "Dohade ni Iku ze!!" (Japanese: ド派手に行くぜ‼)	Takuya Nonaka	Takuya Nonaka & Haruo Sotozaki	January 2, 2022	February 11, 2024	7.7%
39	13 (6)	"Layered Memories"; Transliteration: "Kasanaru Kioku" (Japanese: 重なる記憶)	Jun'ichi Minamino	Takahiro Miura	January 9, 2022	February 18, 2024	7.5%
40	14 (7)	"Transformation"; Transliteration: "Henbō" (Japanese: 変貌)	Seiji Harada	Takahiro Miura	January 16, 2022	February 25, 2024	8.3%
41	15 (8)	"Gathering"; Transliteration: "Shūketsu" (Japanese: 集結)	Ken Takahashi	Ken Takahashi	January 23, 2022	March 3, 2024	7.5%
42	16 (9)	"Defeating an Upper Rank Demon"; Transliteration: "Jōgen no Oni o Taoshitara" (Japanese: 上弦の鬼を倒したら)	Jun'ichi Minamino	Haruo Sotozaki	January 30, 2022	March 10, 2024	8.2%
43	17 (10)	"Never Give Up"; Transliteration: "Zettai Akiramenai" (Japanese: 絶対諦めない)	Toshiyuki Shirai	Toshiyuki Shirai	February 6, 2022	March 17, 2024	8.5%
44	18 (11)	"No Matter How Many Lives"; Transliteration: "Nando Umarekawatte mo" (Japanese: 何度生まれ変わっても)	Hideki Hosokawa	Toshiyuki Shirai & Takashi Suhara	February 13, 2022 (Note: Episode 44 is a 32 minute special.)	March 24, 2024	9.1%

=== Season 3: Swordsmith Village Arc (2023) ===
Story	Episode	Title	Directed by	Storyboarded by	Original release date	English air date	Viewership rating
45	1	"Someone's Dream"; Transliteration: "Dareka no Yume" (Japanese: 誰かの夢)	Shin'ya Shimomura & Takashi Suhara	Takashi Suhara & Yūichi Terao	April 9, 2023 (Note: Episode 45 is a 49 minute special)	August 11, 2024	8.0%
46	2	"Yoriichi Type Zero"; Transliteration: "Yoriichi Zeroshiki" (Japanese: 縁壱零式)	Akihiko Uda	Kei Tsunematsu	April 16, 2023	August 18, 2024	7.6%
47	3	"A Sword from Over 300 Years Ago"; Transliteration: "Sanbyaku-nen Ijō Mae no Katana" (Japanese: 300年以上前の刀)	Ken Nakazawa	Hideki Hosokawa	April 23, 2023	August 25, 2024	6.4%
48	4	"Thank You, Tokito"; Transliteration: "Tokitō-kun Arigatō" (Japanese: 時透君ありがとう)	Hideki Hosokawa	Hideki Hosokawa	April 30, 2023	September 1, 2024	7.0%
49	5	"Bright Red Sword"; Transliteration: "Kakutō" (Japanese: 赫刀)	Takuya Nonaka	Takuya Nonaka	May 7, 2023	September 8, 2024	7.2%
50	6	"Aren't You Going to Become a Hashira?"; Transliteration: "Hashira ni Narun ja Nai no ka!" (Japanese: 柱になるんじゃないのか！)	Seiji Harada	Kei Tsunematsu	May 14, 2023	September 15, 2024	7.6%
51	7	"Awful Villain"; Transliteration: "Gokuakunin" (Japanese: 極悪人)	Hideki Hosokawa	Yō Miura	May 21, 2023	September 22, 2024	7.0%
52	8	"The Mu in Muichiro"; Transliteration: "Muichirō no Mu" (Japanese: 無一郎の無)	Jun'ichi Minamino	Toshiyuki Shirai	May 28, 2023	September 29, 2024	7.0%
53	9	"Mist Hashira Muichiro Tokito"; Transliteration: "Kasumi Bashira・Tokitō Muichirō" (Japanese: 霞柱・時透無一郎)	Akihiko Uda	Yō Miura	June 4, 2023	October 6, 2024	7.3%
54	10	"Love Hashira Mitsuri Kanroji"; Transliteration: "Koi Bashira・Kanroji Mitsuri" (Japanese: 恋柱・甘露寺蜜璃)	Yūji Shimizu	Yūji Shimizu	June 11, 2023	October 13, 2024	7.6%
55	11	"A Connected Bond: Daybreak and First Light"; Transliteration: "Tsunaida Kizuna Kawataredoki Asaborake" (Japanese: 繋いだ絆 彼は誰時 朝ぼらけ)	Ken Nakazawa, Seiji Harada, Takashi Suhara & Jun'ichi Minamino	Haruo Sotozaki & Takashi Suhara	June 18, 2023 (Note: Episode 55 is a 52 minute special)	October 20, 2024	7.6%

=== Season 4: Hashira Training Arc (2024) ===
Story	Episode	Title	Directed by	Storyboarded by	Original release date	Viewership rating
56	1	"To Defeat Muzan Kibutsuji"; Transliteration: "Kibutsuji Muzan o Taosu Tame ni" (Japanese: 鬼舞辻󠄀無惨を倒すために)	Shin'ya Shimomura & Takashi Suhara	Shin'ya Shimomura & Takashi Suhara	May 12, 2024 (Note: Episode 56 is a 48 minute special)	6.9%
57	2	"Water Hashira Giyu Tomioka's Pain"; Transliteration: "Mizu Bashira・Tomioka Giyū no Itami" (Japanese: 水柱・冨岡義勇の痛み)	Yūji Shimizu	Yūji Shimizu	May 19, 2024	6.1%
58	3	"Fully Recovered Tanjiro Joins the Hashira Training!!"; Transliteration: "Tanjirō Zenkai‼ Bashira Keiko Dai Sanka" (Japanese: 炭治郎全快‼ 柱稽古大参加)	Takashi Mamekuza	Yō Miura	May 26, 2024	6.3%
59	4	"To Bring a Smile to One's Face"; Transliteration: "Egao ni Nareru" (Japanese: 笑顔になれる)	Seiji Harada	Haruo Sotozaki	June 2, 2024	6.7%
60	5	"I Even Ate Demons"; Transliteration: "Oni o Kutte Made" (Japanese: 鬼を喰ってまで)	Hideki Hosokawa	Hideki Hosokawa & Haruo Sotozaki	June 9, 2024	5.8%
61	6	"The Strongest of the Demon Slayer Corps"; Transliteration: "Kisatsutai Saikyō" (Japanese: 鬼殺隊最強)	Ken Nakazawa	Ken Nakazawa	June 16, 2024	6.4%
62	7	"Stone Hashira Gyomei Himejima"; Transliteration: "Iwa Bashira・Himejima Gyōmei" (Japanese: 岩柱・悲鳴嶼行冥)	Akihiko Uda	Takashi Suhara	June 23, 2024 (Note: Episode 62 is a 31 minute special)	5.5%
63	8	"The Hashira Unite"; Transliteration: "Bashira・Kesshū" (Japanese: 柱・結集)	Yūji Shimizu, Seiji Harada & Haruo Sotozaki	Takashi Suhara & Yō Miura	June 30, 2024 (Note: Episode 63 is a 40 minute special)	6.4%

== Home media release ==
The series was released in Japan by Aniplex on eleven Blu-ray and DVD volumes beginning on July 31, 2019, and concluded on June 24, 2020. Each volume features cover art illustrated by the series' character designer, Akira Matsushima, and the limited-edition includes bonus CD containing original drama or soundtrack. Aniplex of America released the first limited-edition Blu-ray volume in North America on June 30, 2020, and the second volume was released on November 24, 2020. The company, in partnership with Funimation, released the standard-edition Blu-ray volumes in September 2020 and January 2021.

=== Japanese ===
Season 1 – Tanjiro Kamado, Unwavering Resolve Arc (Note: Risshi-hen (立志編))
Vol.	Episodes	Cover art	Bonus disc	Release date	Ref.
1	1–2	Tanjiro Kamado	Drama CD and Soundtrack	July 31, 2019	
2	3–5	Giyū Tomioka	Soundtrack	August 28, 2019	
3	6–7	Nezuko Kamado	Drama CD	September 25, 2019	
4	8–10	Tanjiro Kamado and Muzan Kibutsuji	Soundtrack	October 30, 2019	
5	11–12	Zenitsu Agatsuma	Drama CD	November 27, 2019	
6	13–14	Inosuke Hashibira	Soundtrack	December 25, 2019	
7	15–17	Tanjiro Kamado, Zenitsu Agatsuma and Inosuke Hashibira	Drama CD	January 29, 2020	
8	18–19	Tanjiro Kamado	Soundtrack	February 26, 2020	
9	20–21	Nezuko Kamado	Soundtrack	March 25, 2020	
10	22–24	Shinobu Kochō	Drama CD	May 27, 2020	
11	25–26	Tanjiro Kamado and Nezuko Kamado	Soundtrack	June 24, 2020	

Season 2 – Mugen Train Arc and Entertainment District Arc
Volume		Season eps.	Arc eps.	Cover art	Bonus disc	Release date	Ref.
Mugen Train Arc	1	1	1	Kyojuro Rengoku	Soundtrack	January 26, 2022	
Mugen Train Arc	2	2–7	2–7	Tanjiro Kamado and Kyojuro Rengoku	—N/a	February 9, 2022	
Entertainment District Arc	1	8	1	Tengen Uzui	Soundtrack	February 23, 2022	
Entertainment District Arc	2	9–10	2–3	Tanjiro Kamado, Zenitsu Agatsuma and Inosuke Hashibira	Soundtrack	March 30, 2022	
Entertainment District Arc	3	11–12	4–5	Tanjiro Kamado	Soundtrack	April 27, 2022	
Entertainment District Arc	4	13–14	6–7	Nezuko Kamado	Soundtrack	May 25, 2022	
Entertainment District Arc	5	15–16	8–9	Daki and Gyutaro	Soundtrack	June 29, 2022	
Entertainment District Arc	6	17–18	10–11	Tanjiro Kamado and Tengen Uzui	Soundtrack	July 27, 2022	

Season 3 – Swordsmith Village Arc (Note: Katanakaji no Sato-hen (刀鍛冶の里編))
Vol.	Episodes	Cover art	Bonus disc	Release date	Ref.
1	1	Mitsuri Kanroji	Soundtrack	June 21, 2023	
2	2–3	Muichiro Tokito	Soundtrack	July 26, 2023	
3	4–5	Tanjiro Kamado	Soundtrack	August 30, 2023	
4	6–7	Genya Shinazugawa	Soundtrack	September 27, 2023	
5	8–9	Tanjiro Kamado, Mitsuri Kanroji, Genya Shinazugawa and Muichiro Tokito	Soundtrack	October 25, 2023	
6	10–11	Tanjiro Kamado and Nezuko Kamado	Soundtrack	November 22, 2023	

Season 4 – Hashira Training Arc (Note: Hashira Geiko-hen (柱稽古編))
Vol.	Episodes	Cover art	Bonus disc	Release date	Ref.
1	1	Obanai Iguro and Sanemi Shinazugawa	Soundtrack	July 3, 2024	
2	2–3	Shinobu Kochō, Giyū Tomioka and Tengen Uzui	Soundtrack	August 7, 2024	
3	4–6	Muichiro Tokito, Mitsuri Kanroji and Gyomei Himejima	Soundtrack	September 4, 2024	
4	7–8	Kagaya Ubuyashiki and Muzan Kibutsuji	Soundtrack	October 2, 2024	

=== English ===
Season 1 – Tanjiro Kamado, Unwavering Resolve Arc (Aniplex of America)
Vol.	Episodes	Release date	Ref.
1	1–13	June 30, 2020	
2	14–26	November 14, 2020	

Season 1 – Tanjiro Kamado, Unwavering Resolve Arc (Crunchyroll, LLC)
Vol.	Episodes	Release date	Ref.
1	1–13	September 29, 2020	
2	14–26	January 19, 2021	

Season 2 – Mugen Train Arc and Entertainment District Arc
Title	Season eps.	Arc eps.	Standard edition release date	Limited edition release date	Ref.
Mugen Train Arc	1–7	1–7	September 27, 2022		
Entertainment District Arc	8–18	1–11	December 19, 2022		

Season 3 – Swordsmith Village Arc
Vol.	Episodes	Standard edition release date	Limited edition release date	Ref.
1	1–11	December 3, 2024	June 25, 2024	

Season 4 – Hashira Training Arc
Vol.	Episodes	Standard edition release date	Limited edition release date	Ref.
1	1–8	December 9, 2025	April 22, 2025	
