= Demon Slayer: Kimetsu no Yaiba – The Movie: Infinity Castle =

2025 anime film by Haruo Sotozaki

- Theatrical release poster
- Kanji: 劇場版「鬼滅の刃」無限城編 第一章 猗窩座再来
- Revised Hepburn: Gekijōban Kimetsu no Yaiba: Mugen Jō-hen Dai Isshō Akaza Sairai
- Directed by: Haruo Sotozaki
- Screenplay by: Ufotable
- Based on: Demon Slayer: Kimetsu no Yaiba by Koyoharu Gotouge
- Produced by: Akifumi Fujio; Masanori Miyake; Yūma Takahashi
- Starring: Natsuki Hanae; Akari Kitō; Yoshitsugu Matsuoka; Hiro Shimono; Takahiro Sakurai; Akira Ishida; Saori Hayami; Mamoru Miyano
- Cinematography: Yūichi Terao
- Edited by: Manabu Kamino
- Music by: Yuki Kajiura; Go Shiina
- Production company: Ufotable
- Distributed by: Aniplex; Toho
- Release date: July 18, 2025
- Running time: 155 minutes
- Country: Japan
- Language: Japanese
- Budget: $20 million
- Box office: $793.5 million

Demon Slayer: Kimetsu no Yaiba – The Movie: Infinity Castle (Note: Japanese: 劇場版「鬼滅の刃」無限城編 第一章 猗窩座再来, Hepburn: Gekijōban Kimetsu no Yaiba: Mugen Jō-hen Dai Isshō Akaza Sairai) (Note: Officially titled Demon Slayer: Kimetsu no Yaiba – The Movie: Infinity Castle Arc – Part 1: Akaza Returns in Japan, and commonly known as Demon Slayer: Infinity Castle) is a 2025 Japanese animated dark fantasy film based on the "Infinity Castle" arc of the 2016–20 manga series Demon Slayer: Kimetsu no Yaiba by Koyoharu Gotouge. It is a direct sequel to the fourth season of the anime television series as well as the manga fourth, fifth, and sixth adaptations, following the film Mugen Train (2020) and the feature-length compilations To the Swordsmith Village (2023) and To the Hashira Training (2024). It is directed by Haruo Sotozaki, produced by Ufotable, and written by the studio's staff members. It follows the Demon Slayer Corps in their decisive climactic battle against Muzan Kibutsuji and the remaining Upper Ranks within the titular "Infinity Castle".

Unlike the Swordsmith Village and Hashira Training adaptations, which are compilations of episodes from the anime series, Infinity Castle is a feature-length multi-film adaptation due to the arc's content and dramatic pacing, similarly to Mugen Train. It is the first film of a trilogy announced in June 2024, immediately following the airing of the fourth season's finale.

It was released in Japan on July 18, 2025, by Aniplex and Toho. It was released by Crunchyroll through Sony Pictures Releasing in select Asian countries in August, before releasing in all other territories the following month. The film became the seventh-highest-grossing film of 2025, grossing $793.5 million worldwide, and broke numerous box office records. The film received positive reviews from critics, who praised its action sequences, visuals, and engaging story, although the pacing received some criticism. The film won numerous awards including Best Animation Film at the 49th Japan Academy Film Prize, a record-breaking seven awards including Film of the Year at the 10th Crunchyroll Anime Awards and Best Picture (Film) at the Newtype Anime Awards.

== Plot ==
After recovering from Kagaya Ubuyashiki's trap and subduing Tamayo, Muzan Kibutsuji retreats into his dimensional stronghold, the Infinity Castle, and traps the Demon Slayer Corps inside. (Note: As depicted in the final episode of Season 4 of the television series.) The Demon Slayers are separated and face hordes of Lower Rank-level demons as they search for Muzan and Tamayo. Kagaya's son, Kiriya, and daughters, Kuina and Kanata, lead the operation by mapping the Infinity Castle with the Kasugai crows and locating its inhabitants, with former Hashiras Tengen Uzui and Shinjuro Rengoku standing guard.

Shinobu Kocho encounters Upper Rank Two Doma, recognizing him as her sister Kanae's killer. Despite her use of poisons, Doma develops immunity to her attacks, ultimately killing and consuming her. Shinobu's adoptive younger sister Kanao Tsuyuri arrives too late to save her and takes her place in the battle against Doma, while the Kasugai crows announce Shinobu's death to the rest of the Demon Slayers.

Zenitsu Agatsuma faces his former senior Kaigaku, who became the new Upper Rank Six after an encounter with Upper Rank One Kokushibo. Angered by Kaigaku's lack of guilt over his betrayal, which led to their master Jigoro committing seppuku, they battle. Kaigaku voices his frustration at being compared to Zenitsu, but is killed when he uses a self-taught Thunder Breathing form. Zenitsu passes out and momentarily enters the afterlife, where Jigoro reaffirms he has always been proud of him; he is then rescued by a disguised Yushiro, who has been using his Blood Demon Art to help the Ubuyashikis map the Infinity Castle. Meanwhile, Nezuko Kamado takes a drug produced by Shinobu and Tamayo to restore her humanity and is placed under the care of Sakonji Urokodaki.

Tanjiro Kamado and Giyu Tomioka fight Upper Rank Three Akaza. Though Giyu unlocks his mark to enhance his power, Akaza continues to overwhelm them. Determining that the demon is able to target people based on their willpower, Tanjiro recalls memories of Inosuke's ability to detect attacks and observing his late father in combat. He enters the Transparent World and Selfless State, giving him heightened perception and masking his emotions, successfully beheading Akaza. However, Akaza's body continues to resist and fight Tanjiro and Giyu while headless, pushing them to the brink.

Their persistence causes Akaza to remember his tragic past; he was a young criminal named Hakuji, who stole to fund his father's medication. After Hakuji was caught stealing numerous times, his father committed suicide to unburden him, leading to a chance encounter with a dojo owner, Keizo. Hakuji served as his sole disciple while caring for his sick daughter, Koyuki. Hakuji and Koyuki eventually became engaged, but she and her father were poisoned by a resentful neighboring dojo that wanted his land while he visited his father's grave. The vengeful Hakuji massacred all of the dojo's members and was turned into a demon during an encounter with Muzan afterwards.

Despite regenerating his head out of sheer will, Akaza realizes his mistakes through his restored memories. Giving a final smile of gratitude to Tanjiro, he fatally injures himself and stops his regeneration, accepting defeat. He reconciles with his loved ones and reunites with Koyuki, who embraces him before accompanying him to Hell. Tanjiro and Giyu pass out from exhaustion as their victory is announced by the Kasugai crows.

Kokushibo and Doma are disappointed by Akaza's death, while the Infinity Castle's owner, Upper Rank Four Nakime, manipulates its layout to confuse the Ubuyashikis. Muzan traps Tamayo in a cocoon of his flesh, remaining confident of his victory over the Demon Slayers.

== Voice cast ==
The following are the voice cast in billed order.

| Character | Japanese | English |
|---|---|---|
| Tanjiro Kamado (竈門 炭治郎, Kamado Tanjirō) | Natsuki Hanae | Zach Aguilar |
| Nezuko Kamado (竈門 禰豆子, Kamado Nezuko) | Akari Kitō | Abby Trott |
| Zenitsu Agatsuma (我妻 善逸, Agatsuma Zenitsu) | Hiro Shimono | Aleks Le |
| Inosuke Hashibira (嘴平 伊之助, Hashibira Inosuke) | Yoshitsugu Matsuoka | Bryce Papenbrook |
| Kanao Tsuyuri (栗花落 カナヲ, Tsuyuri Kanao) | Reina Ueda | Brianna Knickerbocker |
| Genya Shinazugawa (不死川 玄弥, Shinazugawa Genya) | Nobuhiko Okamoto | Zeno Robinson |
| Giyu Tomioka (富岡 義勇, Tomioka Giyū) | Takahiro Sakurai | Johnny Yong Bosch |
| Tengen Uzui (宇髄 天元, Uzui Tengen) | Katsuyuki Konishi | Ray Chase |
| Muichiro Tokito (時透 無一郎, Tokitō Muichirō) | Kengo Kawanishi | Griffin Burns |
| Shinobu Kocho (胡蝶 しのぶ, Kochō Shinobu) | Saori Hayami | Erika Harlacher |
| Obanai Iguro (伊黒 小芭内, Iguro Obanai) | Kenichi Suzumura | Erik Scott Kimerer |
| Sanemi Shinazugawa (不死川 実弥, Shinazugawa Sanemi) | Tomokazu Seki | Kaiji Tang |
| Mitsuri Kanroji (甘露寺 蜜璃, Kanroji Mitsuri) | Kana Hanazawa | Kira Buckland |
| Gyomei Himejima (悲鳴嶼 行冥, Himejima Gyōmei) | Tomokazu Sugita | Crispin Freeman |
| Doma / Upper Rank 2 (童磨, Dōma) | Mamoru Miyano | Stephen Fu |
| Akaza / Upper Rank 3 (猗窩座, Akaza) | Akira Ishida | Lucien Dodge |
| Kaigaku / Upper Rank 6 (獪岳, Kaigaku) | Yoshimasa Hosoya | Alejandro Saab |
| Keizo (慶蔵, Keizō) | Yuichi Nakamura | Channing Tatum |
| Koyuki (恋雪, Koyuki) | Lynn | Rebecca Wang |

== Production ==
During the theatrical release of Demon Slayer: Kimetsu no Yaiba – The Movie: Mugen Train, Atsuhiro Iwakami, President and executive director of Aniplex, said that Hikaru Kondo, President and Producer of Ufotable, talked to him about the idea of producing an adaptation for the Infinity Castle arch in the form of a theatrical trilogy. It begins with the idea of being confidential.

After that, it was officially approved by the production committee consisting of Aniplex (theatrical distribution rights owner), Shueisha (owner of the manga rights), and Ufotable (responsible for crafting the animation), and preliminary preparations were made before entering this production in the form of sharing with some anime staff. The first installment of the trilogy had a production period of three and a half years, beginning in early 2022 while the Entertainment District Arc was still airing.

== Music ==
Yuki Kajiura and Go Shiina composed the film's music, after previously doing so in the anime series and the previous three films. The film's theme songs were "Taiyō ga Noboranai Sekai" (太陽が昇らない世界; lit. 'A World Where the Sun Never Rises') performed by Aimer, and "Zankoku no Yoru ni Kagayake" (残酷な夜に輝け; lit. 'Shine in the Cruel Night') performed by LiSA.

== Release ==
=== Theatrical ===
The first film was released by Aniplex and Toho on July 18, 2025. Sony Pictures Releasing International distributed the film in international markets under Crunchyroll. It was released in the following countries:

- August 8: Taiwan
- August 12: Thailand
- August 14: Hong Kong, Malaysia, Pakistan, Singapore, Laos
- August 15: Cambodia, Indonesia, Vietnam
- August 20: Philippines
- August 22: South Korea
- September 11: Argentina, Armenia, Australia, Azerbaijan, Bahrain, Bolivia, Brazil, the Caribbean (Jamaica, Aruba, Suriname, Trinidad & Tobago, Curaçao), Central America, Chile, Colombia, Croatia, Czech Republic, Denmark, Dominican Republic, Ecuador, Egypt, Ethiopia, Georgia, Greece, Hungary, Iceland, Iraq, Israel, Italy, Jordan, Kazakhstan, Kuwait, Lebanon, Lithuania, Mexico, Netherlands, New Zealand, North Macedonia, Oman, Paraguay, Peru, Portugal, Qatar, Saudi Arabia, Serbia, Slovakia, Slovenia, Switzerland (Italian-speaking), Syria, Ukraine, United Arab Emirates, Uruguay, Venezuela
- September 12: Bulgaria, Canada, Estonia, Finland, India, Ireland, Kenya, Latvia, Mongolia, Nigeria, Norway, Poland, Romania, Southern Africa, Spain, Sweden, Turkey, United Kingdom, United States
- September 16: Bangladesh
- September 17: Belgium, France, French-speaking Africa, Luxembourg, Switzerland (French-speaking)
- September 18: Austria, Germany, Moldova, Switzerland (German-speaking)
- November 14: China

In Japan, it was distributed in 443 theaters on its release date. Throughout the first quarter of 2026, the film was announced to be re-released in various countries, starting with screenings in IMAX's 1:43:1 aspect ratio, ScreenX's 270-degree aspect ratio, and Ultra 4DX in Japan on February 6, alongside a "Breathing Enhanced Version" of the film's 4DX experience that was announced for February 20. The IMAX showings marked the first time an anime film was released in this aspect ratio.

=== Marketing ===
Ufotable, in collaboration with Major League Baseball, released a short film to promote the first film and the series as well as the upcoming opening game of the 2025 season between the Los Angeles Dodgers and the Chicago Cubs at the Tokyo Dome on March 18. The film, featuring Hōchū Ōtsuka as the voice of Sakonji Urokodaki (鱗滝 左近次, Urokodaki Sakonji), one of the series' characters, narrates the history of baseball and the series. Toho also released an edited version of the whole series on April 4, 2025, in Japanese theatres. The first film's official main trailer was released on June 28, 2025, at an event broadcast on Fuji TV in Japan. The trailer registered more than 40 million views within 24 hours on official social media platforms.

=== Home media ===
In April 2026, Demon Slayer: Kimetsu no Yaiba – The Movie: Infinity Castle was announced to be released on Blu-Ray and DVD in Japan on July 29. In July 2026, during the film's Anime Expo panel, it was announced that Crunchyroll is streaming the film on July 28.

== Reception ==
=== Box office ===
The film debuted with strong box office success, setting multiple records nationwide. On its opening day, it earned ¥1.64 billion (US$11.11 million) with 1.15 million admissions, marking the highest opening day gross in Japanese box office history. On the second day, it grossed ¥1.84 billion (US$12.47 million) from 1.26 million admissions. On the third day, it earned ¥2.03 billion (US$13.76 million) from 1.42 million admissions, setting a new record for the highest single-day box office revenue in Japan. The three-day total reached ¥5.52 billion (US$37.42 million) from 3.84 million admissions, making it the biggest opening weekend of all time in Japanese cinema. On its fourth day, a public holiday, the film earned ¥1.79 billion (US$12.13 million) from 1.32 million admissions, bringing its four-day total to ¥7.31 billion (US$49.55 million) with 5.16 million tickets sold, making it the second-highest-grossing film of 2025 in Japan behind Detective Conan: One-eyed Flashback. Within eight days of release, Infinity Castle earned ¥10.5 billion yen ($71 million) from 7.5 million ticket sales, becoming the fastest film to reach the ¥10 billion milestone and breaking the previous record set by Demon Slayer: Kimetsu no Yaiba – The Movie: Mugen Train. In 10 days, Infinity Castle grossed ¥2.87 billion ($87 million). As of July 2026, the film has grossed ¥40.24 billion in Japan.

The film became the seventh-highest-grossing film of 2025, grossing $793.5 million worldwide, and the highest-grossing international film in the U.S. (previously held by 2000's Crouching Tiger, Hidden Dragon). The film grossed $70 million in its U.S. opening weekend, setting the record for the biggest opening weekend for an international film in the U.S. as well as the biggest opening for an R-rated animated film. It was projected to earn $17.3 million at the box office in the final weekend of September. It debuted in first place with US$49.9 million at China's box office, and concluded with US$96 million. The film also broke multiple box-office records, including becoming the highest-grossing Japanese film, the highest-grossing R-rated animated film, the second-highest-grossing adult animated film and the first R-rated non-American and animated film to gross over $700 million mark, as well as overtaking The Simpsons Movie (2007) as the highest-grossing film based on an animated television series and the second highest-grossing traditionally animated film, behind The Lion King (1994). It's also the highest-grossing traditionally animated film in its initial release, surpassing the initial gross of The Lion King.

=== Critical response ===
On the review aggregator website Rotten Tomatoes, 98% of 62 critics' reviews are positive, with an average rating of 8/10. The website's consensus reads: "Storming the big screen with Demon Slayer's most polished presentation yet, Infinity Castle is a stirring beginning to this franchise's bloody climax." Metacritic, which uses a weighted average, assigned the film a score of 67 out of 100, based on 11 critics, indicating "generally favorable" reviews. The film received a strong reception from Japanese audiences, topping Filmarks' first-day satisfaction ranking with an average score of 4.36 out of 5, based on 8,114 user reviews.

Critics gave the film generally positive reviews, highlighting its action sequences, visuals, and story, while some criticized its pacing. Richard Eisenbeis of Anime News Network graded the film a C+, praising its animation, character arcs, and intense battles, but criticized its repetitive structure and reliance on flashbacks, which he argued hinder the pacing. Matt Schley of The Japan Times offered a mixed assessment, commending the animation and faithful adaptation of the manga but criticizing the extended runtime and lack of narrative closure. Phuong Le of The Guardian gave the film 4 out of 5 stars, describing it as "a spectacular treat" and praising its visuals and emotional impact, while noting that flashback sequences sometimes slowed the pacing.

=== Accolades ===
Accolades received by Demon Slayer: Kimetsu no Yaiba – The Movie: Infinity Castle
| Award | Date of ceremony | Category | Recipient(s) | Result | Ref. |
|---|---|---|---|---|---|
| Abema Anime Trend Awards | December 26, 2025 | Anime Topic Award – Movie Category | Demon Slayer: Kimetsu no Yaiba – The Movie: Infinity Castle | Won | |
| AnimaniA Awards | July 31, 2026 | Best Movie: Cinematic Release | Demon Slayer: Kimetsu no Yaiba – The Movie: Infinity Castle | Won | |
| AnimaniA Awards | July 31, 2026 | Best Anime Song | Taiyō ga Noboranai Sekai (by Aimer) | Nominated | |
| Anime Grand Prix | July 13, 2026 | Grand Prix | Demon Slayer: Kimetsu no Yaiba – The Movie: Infinity Castle | 3rd place | |
| Anime Grand Prix | July 13, 2026 | Best Theme Song | "Zankoku no Yoru ni Kagayake" (by LiSA) | 3rd place | |
| Anime Grand Prix | July 13, 2026 | Best Voice Actor | Saori Hayami | Won | |
| Astra Film Awards | January 9, 2026 | Best Animated Feature | Demon Slayer: Kimetsu no Yaiba – The Movie: Infinity Castle | Nominated | |
| Astra Film Awards | January 9, 2026 | Animation Is Cinema Award | Demon Slayer: Kimetsu no Yaiba – The Movie: Infinity Castle | Honored | |
| British Academy Film Awards | February 22, 2026 | Best Animated Film | Demon Slayer: Kimetsu no Yaiba – The Movie: Infinity Castle | Longlisted | |
| Critics' Choice Awards Celebration of Cinema and Television | November 14, 2025 | International Animation Award | Demon Slayer: Kimetsu no Yaiba – The Movie: Infinity Castle | Won | |
| Critics' Choice Super Awards | August 6, 2026 | Best Superhero Movie | Demon Slayer: Kimetsu no Yaiba – The Movie: Infinity Castle | Nominated | |
| Crunchyroll Anime Awards | May 23, 2026 | Film of the Year | Demon Slayer: Kimetsu no Yaiba – The Movie: Infinity Castle | Won | |
| Crunchyroll Anime Awards | May 23, 2026 | Best Score | Yuki Kajiura and Go Shiina | Won | |
| Crunchyroll Anime Awards | May 23, 2026 | Best Voice Artist Performance (English) | Lucien Dodge (as Akaza) | Won | |
| Crunchyroll Anime Awards | May 23, 2026 | Best Voice Artist Performance (Brazilian Portuguese) | Charles Emmanuel (as Akaza) | Won | |
| Crunchyroll Anime Awards | May 23, 2026 | Best Voice Artist Performance (Castilian Spanish) | Carles Teruel (as Akaza) | Won | |
| Crunchyroll Anime Awards | May 23, 2026 | Best Voice Artist Performance (German) | Gerrit Schmidt—Foß (as Akaza) | Won | |
| Crunchyroll Anime Awards | May 23, 2026 | Best Voice Artist Performance (Hindi) | Akshita Mishra (as Koyuki) | Nominated | |
| Crunchyroll Anime Awards | May 23, 2026 | Best Voice Artist Performance (Latin Spanish) | Jose Antonio Toledano (as Akaza) | Won | |
| Golden Globe Awards | January 11, 2026 | Best Motion Picture – Animated | Demon Slayer: Kimetsu no Yaiba – The Movie: Infinity Castle | Nominated | |
| Gold House | May 9, 2026 | Gold100 List | Koyoharu Gotouge | Included | |
| Golden Tomato Awards | January 13, 2026 | Fan Favorite Movies | Demon Slayer: Kimetsu no Yaiba – The Movie: Infinity Castle | Nominated | |
| Golden Tomato Awards | January 13, 2026 | Fan Favorite Animated Movie | Demon Slayer: Kimetsu no Yaiba – The Movie: Infinity Castle | Won | |
| Golden Tomato Awards | January 13, 2026 | Most Relatable Villain | Akaza | Won | |
| Harvey Awards | October 9, 2026 | Best Adaptation from Comic Book/Graphic Novel | Demon Slayer: Kimetsu no Yaiba – The Movie: Infinity Castle | Nominated | |
| Hochi Film Awards | December 15, 2025 | Best Animated Picture | Demon Slayer: Kimetsu no Yaiba – The Movie: Infinity Castle | Won | |
| Japan Academy Film Prize | March 13, 2026 | Best Animation Film | Demon Slayer: Kimetsu no Yaiba – The Movie: Infinity Castle | Won | |
| Japan Academy Film Prize | March 13, 2026 | Creative Contribution Award | Demon Slayer: Kimetsu no Yaiba – The Movie: Infinity Castle | Honored | |
| Japan Expo Awards | July 10, 2026 | Daruma for Best Feature Film | Demon Slayer: Kimetsu no Yaiba – The Movie: Infinity Castle | Nominated | |
| Japan Expo Awards | July 10, 2026 | Daruma for Best Original Soundtrack | Demon Slayer: Kimetsu no Yaiba – The Movie: Infinity Castle | Nominated | |
| Las Vegas Film Critics Society | December 19, 2025 | Best Animated Film | Demon Slayer: Kimetsu no Yaiba – The Movie: Infinity Castle | Nominated | |
| Manga Barcelona Awards | December 5,2025 | Best Anime Movie Premiere | Demon Slayer: Kimetsu no Yaiba – The Movie: Infinity Castle | Won | |
| Manga Barcelona Awards | December 5,2026 | Best Anime Dubbed in Catalan | Demon Slayer: Kimetsu no Yaiba – The Movie: Infinity Castle | Pending | |
| New Mexico Film Critics Association Awards | December 21, 2025 | Best Animated Film | Demon Slayer: Kimetsu no Yaiba – The Movie: Infinity Castle | Won | |
| New Mexico Film Critics Association Awards | December 21, 2025 | Best Adapted Screenplay | Hikaru Kondô and Koyoharu Gotouge | Runner-up | |
| Newtype Anime Awards | October 17, 2026 | Best Picture (Film) | Demon Slayer: Kimetsu no Yaiba – The Movie: Infinity Castle | Won | |
| Producers Guild of America Awards | February 28, 2026 | Outstanding Producer of Animated Theatrical Motion Pictures | Akifumi Fujio, Masanori Miyake, and Yūma Takahashi | Nominated | |
| Reiwa Anisong Awards | January 17, 2026 | Lyricist Award | "Zankoku no Yoru ni Kagayake" (by LiSA) (Note: Yuki Kajiura is credited as the nominee.) | Won | |
| Saturn Awards | March 8, 2026 | Best International Animated Film | Demon Slayer: Kimetsu no Yaiba – The Movie: Infinity Castle | Won | |
| Tokyo Anime Award Festival | March 16, 2026 | Animation of the Year (Feature Film) | Demon Slayer: Kimetsu no Yaiba – The Movie: Infinity Castle | Won | |
| Yahoo! Japan Search Awards | December 3, 2025 | Movie Category | Demon Slayer: Kimetsu no Yaiba – The Movie: Infinity Castle | 2nd place | |
