= Demon Slayer: Kimetsu no Yaiba (TV series) =

Japanese anime television series

- 鬼滅の刃; Kimetsu no Yaiba
- Genre: Adventure; Dark fantasy; Martial arts
- Based on: Demon Slayer: Kimetsu no Yaiba by Koyoharu Gotouge
- Developed by: Ufotable
- Directed by: Haruo Sotozaki
- Voices of: Natsuki Hanae; Akari Kitō; Hiro Shimono; Yoshitsugu Matsuoka
- Music by: Yuki Kajiura; Go Shiina
- Country of origin: Japan
- Original language: Japanese
- No. of seasons: 4
- No. of episodes: 63 (list of episodes)

Production
- Producers: Akifumi Fujio; Masanori Miyake; Yūma Takahashi; Hikaru Kondō (S1); Takashi Takano (S2 EDA)
- Cinematography: Yūichi Terao
- Animator: Ufotable
- Editor: Manabu Kamino
- Production companies: Ufotable; Aniplex; Shueisha

Original release
- Network: Tokyo MX (Note: Also simultaneously broadcast on BS11, GTV, and GYT)
- Release: April 6 – September 28, 2019
- Network: FNS (Fuji TV)
- Release: October 10, 2021 – June 30, 2024

Related
- Mugen Train; Infinity Castle

Demon Slayer: Kimetsu no Yaiba (Japanese: 鬼滅の刃, Hepburn: Kimetsu no Yaiba; rgh. 'Blade of Demon Destruction') is a Japanese anime television series produced by Ufotable, based on the manga series Demon Slayer: Kimetsu no Yaiba by Koyoharu Gotouge. It follows teenage Tanjiro Kamado, who strives to become a Demon Slayer after his family was slaughtered and his younger sister, Nezuko, is turned into a demon.

The series' first season premiered in April 2019, having aired on Tokyo MX and other networks, while from the second season onwards it has aired on Fuji Television and its affiliates. In North America, the series is licensed by Aniplex of America. The English dub of the series aired on Adult Swim's Toonami programming block in the United States.

A sequel film set after the events of the first season, Demon Slayer: Kimetsu no Yaiba – The Movie: Mugen Train, was released in October 2020 while the compilation films, Demon Slayer: Kimetsu no Yaiba – To the Swordsmith Village and Demon Slayer: Kimetsu no Yaiba – To the Hashira Training, were respectively released in February 2023 and February 2024. The film trilogy adapting the manga's "Infinity Castle" story arc premiered in July 2025.

The series received critical acclaim for its storyline, animation, action sequences, characters, and voice acting (original and dubbed), as well as numerous awards, and is considered one of the best anime of the 2010s.

== Plot ==
Set in Taishō era Japan, the series follows Tanjiro Kamado, a teenage boy who joins the Demon Slayer Corps—an organization consisting of humans seeking to hunt down demons—after his family is slaughtered and his sister Nezuko is turned into a demon. The story spans multiple arcs, detailing Tanjiro's growing strength, his bonds with other Corps members, and their quest to defeat the Demon King, Muzan Kibutsuji.

== Series overview ==
Season	Episodes		Originally released		
Season	Episodes		First released	Last released	Network
1	26		April 6, 2019	September 28, 2019	Tokyo MX (Note: Season was simulcast on GTV, GYT, and BS11.)
2	18	7	October 10, 2021	November 28, 2021	Fuji Television
2	18	11	December 5, 2021	February 13, 2022	Fuji Television
3	11		April 9, 2023	June 18, 2023	Fuji Television
4	8		May 12, 2024	June 30, 2024	Fuji Television

== Cast and characters ==
Character	Japanese	English
Main characters
Tanjiro Kamado (竈門 炭治郎, Kamado Tanjirō)	Natsuki Hanae; Satomi Satō (child)	Zach Aguilar; Allegra Clark (child)
Nezuko Kamado (竈門 禰豆子, Kamado Nezuko)	Akari Kitō	Abby Trott
Zenitsu Agatsuma (我妻 善逸, Agatsuma Zen'itsu)	Hiro Shimono	Aleks Le
Inosuke Hashibira (嘴平 伊之助, Hashibira Inosuke)	Yoshitsugu Matsuoka	Bryce Papenbrook
Kanao Tsuyuri (栗花落 カナヲ, Tsuyuri Kanao)	Reina Ueda	Brianna Knickerbocker
Genya Shinazugawa (不死川 玄弥, Shinazugawa Gen'ya)	Nobuhiko Okamoto	Zeno Robinson
Secondary characters
Giyu Tomioka (冨岡 義勇, Tomioka Giyū)	Takahiro Sakurai	Johnny Yong Bosch
Shinobu Kocho (胡蝶 しのぶ, Kochō Shinobu)	Saori Hayami	Erika Harlacher
Kyojuro Rengoku (煉獄 杏寿郎, Rengoku Kyōjurō)	Satoshi Hino; Mariya Ise (child)	Mark Whitten; Ryan Bartley (child)
Tengen Uzui (宇髄 天元, Uzui Tengen)	Katsuyuki Konishi	Ray Chase
Mitsuri Kanroji (甘露寺 蜜璃, Kanroji Mitsuri)	Kana Hanazawa	Kira Buckland
Muichiro Tokito (時透 無一郎, Tokitō Muichirō)	Kengo Kawanishi	Griffin Burns
Sanemi Shinazugawa (不死川 実弥, Shinazugawa Sanemi)	Tomokazu Seki	Kaiji Tang
Obanai Iguro (伊黒 小芭内, Iguro Obanai)	Kenichi Suzumura	Erik Scott Kimerer
Gyomei Himejima (悲鳴嶼 行冥, Himejima Gyōmei)	Tomokazu Sugita	Crispin Freeman
Supporting characters
Kagaya Ubuyashiki (産屋敷 耀哉, Ubuyashiki Kagaya)	Toshiyuki Morikawa	Matthew Mercer
Amane Ubuyashiki (産屋敷 あまね, Ubuyashiki Amane)	Rina Satō	Suzie Yeung
Hinaki Ubuyashiki (産屋敷 ひなき, Ubuyashiki Hinaki)	Yumiri Hanamori	Kimberly Woods
Nichika Ubuyashiki (産屋敷 にちか, Ubuyashiki Nichika)	Ari Ozawa	Brianna Knickerbocker
Kiriya Ubuyashiki (産屋敷 輝利哉, Ubuyashiki Kiriya)	Aoi Yūki	Christine Marie Cabanos
Kanata Ubuyashiki (産屋敷 かなた, Ubuyashiki Kanata)	Shiori Izawa	Mela Lee
Muzan Kibutsuji (鬼舞辻 無惨, Kibutsuji Muzan)	Toshihiko Seki	Greg Chun
Nakime (鳴女, Nakime)	Marina Inoue	Amber Lee Connors
Kaigaku (獪岳, Kaigaku)	Yoshimasa Hosoya	Alejandro Saab
Kokushibo / Upper Rank 1 (黒死牟, Kokushibō)	Ryōtarō Okiayu	Jonah Scott
Doma / Upper Rank 2 (童磨, Dōma)	Mamoru Miyano	Stephen Fu
Akaza / Upper Rank 3 (猗窩座)	Akira Ishida	Lucien Dodge
Hantengu / Upper Rank 4 (半天狗)	Toshio Furukawa (Hantengu and Urami); Yūichirō Umehara (Sekido); Kaito Ishikawa (Karaku); Shunsuke Takeuchi (Urogi); Soma Saito (Aizetsu); Koichi Yamadera (Zohakuten)	Christopher Corey Smith (Hantengu and Urami); Yong Yea (Sekido); Caleb Yen (Karaku); Chris Hackney (Urogi); Brian Timothy Anderson (Aizetsu); Ben Balmaceda (Zohakuten)
Gyokko / Upper Rank 5 (玉壼, Gyokko)	Kohsuke Toriumi	Brent Mukai
Daki / Upper Rank 6 (堕姫, Daki)	Miyuki Sawashiro	Erica Lindbeck
Gyutaro / Upper Rank 6 (妓夫太郎, Gyūtarō)	Ryōta Ōsaka	Brandon McInnis
Enmu / Lower Rank 1 (魘夢, Enmu)	Daisuke Hirakawa	Landon McDonald
Rokuro / Lower Rank 2 (轆轤, Rokuro)	Taiten Kusunoki	Ray Chase
Wakuraba / Lower Rank 3 (病葉, Wakuraba)	Sōichirō Hoshi	Stefan Martello
Mukago / Lower Rank 4 (零余子, Mukago)	Kana Ueda	Kira Buckland
Rui / Lower Rank 5 (累, Rui)	Koki Uchiyama	Billy Kametz
Kamanue / Lower Rank 6 (釜鵺, Kamanue)	KENN	Alan Lee
Kyogai (響凱, Kyōgai)	Junichi Suwabe	Steve Blum
Minor characters
Spider Demon (Mother) (蜘蛛鬼「母」, Kumo Oni: Haha)	Ami Koshimizu	Allegra Clark
Spider Demon (Father) (蜘蛛鬼「父」, Kumo Oni: Chichi)	Tetsu Inada	Kellen Goff
Spider Demon (Brother) (蜘蛛鬼「兄」, Kumo Oni: Ani)	Showtaro Morikubo	Derek Stephen Prince
Spider Demon (Sister) (蜘蛛鬼「姉」, Kumo Oni: Ane)	Ryoko Shiraishi	Erica Lindbeck
Yahaba (矢琶羽, Yahaba)	Jun Fukuyama	Xander Mobus
Susamaru (朱紗丸, Susamaru)	Mikako Komatsu	Sarah Anne Williams
Sakonji Urokodaki (鱗滝 左近次, Urokodaki Sakonji)	Hōchū Ōtsuka	Brook Chalmers
Sabito (錆兎, Sabito)	Yuki Kaji	Max Mittelman
Makomo (真菰, Makomo)	Ai Kakuma	Ryan Bartley
Kasugai Crows (鎹鴉, Kasugai Garasu)	Takumi Yamazaki (Tanjiro's); Rie Kugimiya (Muichiro's)	Doug Erholtz
Tamayo (珠世, Tamayo)	Maaya Sakamoto	Laura Post
Yushiro (愈史郎, Yushirō)	Daiki Yamashita	Kyle McCarley
Makio (まきを, Makio)	Shizuka Ishigami	Erica Mendez
Suma (須磨, Suma)	Nao Tōyama	Emi Lo
Hinatsuru (雛鶴, Hinatsuru)	Atsumi Tanezaki	Anairis Quiñones
Aoi Kanzaki (神崎 アオイ, Kanzaki Aoi)	Yuri Ehara	Reba Buhr
Goto (後藤, Gotō)	Makoto Furukawa	Derek Stephen Prince
Sumi Nakahara (中原 すみ, Nakahara Sumi)	Ayumi Mano	Michelle Marie
Naho Takada (高田 なほ, Takada Naho)	Yūki Kuwahara	Kimberly Woods
Kiyo Terauchi (寺内 きよ, Terauchi Kiyo)	Nanami Yamashita	Jackie Lastra
Hotaru Haganezuka (鋼鐵塚 螢, Haganezuka Hotaru)	Daisuke Namikawa	Robbie Daymond
Kozo Kanamori (鉄穴森 鋼蔵, Kanamori Kōzō)	Eiji Takemoto	Kyle Hebert
Kotetsu (小鉄, Kotetsu)	Ayumu Murase	Jeannie Tirado
Murata (村田, Murata)	Kōki Miyata	Khoi Dao
Jigoro Kuwajima (桑島 慈悟郎, Kuwajima Jigorō)	Shigeru Chiba	John DeMita
Kanae Kocho (胡蝶 カナエ, Kochō Kanae)	Ai Kayano	Bridget Hoffman
Tanjuro Kamado (竈門 炭十郎, Kamado Tanjūrō)	Shin-ichiro Miki	Kirk Thornton
Kie Kamado (竈門 葵枝, Kamado Kie)	Houko Kuwashima	Dorothy Elias-Fahn
Takeo Kamado (竈門 竹雄, Kamado Takeo)	Yō Taichi	Michelle Ruff
Hanako Kamado (竈門 花子, Kamado Hanako)	Konomi Kohara	Ryan Bartley
Shigeru Kamado (竈門 茂, Kamado Shigeru)	Kaede Hondo	Jessica DiCicco
Rokuta Kamado (竈門 六太, Kamado Rokuta)	Aoi Koga	Philece Sampler
Sumiyoshi (炭吉, Sumiyoshi)	Hirofumi Nojima	Howard Wang
Shinjuro Rengoku (煉獄 槇寿郎, Rengoku Shinjurō)	Rikiya Koyama	Imari Williams
Ruka Rengoku (煉獄 瑠火, Rengoku Ruka)	Megumi Toyoguchi	Suzie Yeung
Senjuro Rengoku (煉獄 千寿郎, Rengoku Senjurō)	Junya Enoki	Cedric Williams
Yoriichi Tsugikuni (継国 縁壱, Tsugikuni Yoriichi)	Kazuhiko Inoue	Mick Lauer

== Production ==
=== Season 1 ===
An anime television series adaptation by studio Ufotable was announced by Weekly Shōnen Jump in June 2018. The anime was directed by Haruo Sotozaki and produced by Hikaru Kondo. Akira Matsushima served as the character designer. The series ran for 26 episodes, from April 6 to September 28, 2019, on Tokyo MX and other networks.

=== Season 2 and anime shorts ===
The second season ran for two consecutive cours, beginning with a seven-episode television series adaptation of the "Mugen Train" story arc, broadcast from October 10 to November 28, 2021. It included an original first episode, as well as new animation cuts and background music that differ from the film adaptation. Demon Slayer: Kimetsu no Yaiba – Entertainment District Arc (鬼滅の刃 遊郭編, Kimetsu no Yaiba – Yūkaku-hen) premiered with a one-hour special on December 5, 2021, and aired till February 13, 2022. The main staff and cast members from the first season returned to reprise their roles. The second season of the series aired on 30 stations across Japan, including Fuji TV and its affiliates as well as Tokyo MX.

Four Valentine's Day-themed anime shorts, titled Kimetsu Gakuen Valentine-hen (キメツ学園 バレンタイン編), debuted on the Aniplex YouTube channel on February 14, 2021.

=== Season 3 ===
At the end of the second-season finale, a third season covering the "Swordsmith Village" arc from the manga was announced. It premiered with a one-hour special on April 9, 2023, and ended with a 70-minute episode on June 18 of the same year.

=== Season 4 ===
A fourth season covering the "Hashira Training" arc was announced following the finale of the third season. It premiered with a one-hour special on May 12, 2024. The season ended with a one-hour special, which aired on June 30 of the same year.

=== Compilation films ===
Prior to airing, the first five episodes screened theatrically in Japan for two weeks from March 29, 2019, under the title Demon Slayer: Kimetsu no Yaiba: Sibling's Bond (鬼滅の刃 兄妹の絆, Kimetsu no Yaiba: Kyōdai no Kizuna). Aniplex of America screened the film at the Aratani Theatre in Los Angeles on March 31, 2019. Madman Entertainment screened the film in select theaters in Australia on April 2, 2019. The film was broadcast on Fuji TV's Saturday Premium block on October 10, 2020, followed by Kimetsu no Yaiba: Natagumo Yama-hen (鬼滅の刃 那田蜘蛛山編; "Kimetsu no Yaiba: Mount Natagumo Arc"), which compiled episodes 15–21, on October 17, 2020. Fuji TV also rebroadcast the series in the Kanto area, under the title Kimetsu no Yaiba Zenshūchū! Ikkyo Hōsō (鬼滅の刃全集中！一挙放送; "Kimetsu no Yaiba: Concentration! 一 All-at-once Broadcast"): episodes 6–10 aired from October 12–16, episodes 11–14 on October 17, and episodes 22–26 on October 24, 2020. Episodes 22–26 were recompiled into a special edition episode, titled Hashira Gō Kaigi/Chōyashiki-hen (柱合会議・蝶屋敷編; The Hashira Meeting Arc/Chōyashiki Arc), which adds some new footage and special ending credits roll, and aired on Fuji TV on December 20, 2020.

A compilation film, Demon Slayer: Kimetsu no Yaiba – To the Swordsmith Village, which includes the final two episodes of the Entertainment District Arc and an advanced screening of the first Swordsmith Village Arc episode, premiered in Japan on February 3, 2023. The film premiered in the United Kingdom on March 1, 2023, and in North America on March 3 of the same year.

Another compilation film, Demon Slayer: Kimetsu no Yaiba – To the Hashira Training, which includes the final episode of Swordsmith Village Arc and advanced screening of the first Hashira Training Arc episode, premiered in Japan on February 2, 2024, with a theatrical release on February 23 of the same year.

=== Films ===
On September 28, 2019, following the airing of the first season's finale episode, an anime film, titled Demon Slayer: Kimetsu no Yaiba – The Movie: Mugen Train, was announced, with the staff and cast reprising their roles. The film is a direct sequel to the series, and covers the events of the Mugen Train Arc. The film was distributed in Japan by Aniplex and Toho, and premiered on October 16, 2020. The film has grossed over US$500 million worldwide, making it the highest-grossing film of 2020, and broke several box office records, including the highest-grossing Japanese film and anime film of all time. The film was released worldwide digitally on June 22, 2021.

Following the airing of Hashira Training Arc on June 30, 2024, it was announced that the manga's "Infinity Castle" story arc would be adapted into a film trilogy. The first installment, entitled Part 1: Akaza Returns, was released in Japan on July 18, 2025.

== International release and distribution ==
The series has been licensed by Aniplex's North American subsidiary and streamed it on Crunchyroll, Hulu, and Funimation. Aniplex of America released it on two limited editions Blu-ray volumes: the first on June 30, 2020, and the second on November 24 of that same year. The company also partnered with Funimation to release standard-edition Blu-ray volumes. Two volumes were released on September 29, 2020, and January 19, 2021. Netflix also started streaming the series on January 22, 2021, in the United States and Canada. An English dub produced by Aniplex of America and Bang Zoom! Entertainment, aired on Adult Swim's Toonami programming block from October 13, 2019, to May 3, 2020. (Note: Adult Swim premiered the series on Saturday at 1:30 a.m. (25:30) ET/PT, which is effectively Sunday.) Funimation began streaming the English dub on December 8, 2020.

According to Jason DeMarco, the executive producer who oversees the Adult Swim block, the success of the Mugen Train film initially made further seasons of the series too expensive to acquire for broadcast. Two years later in October 2023, Adult Swim announced that the English dub for the Mugen Train Arc would broadcast on its Toonami block which aired from November 12 to December 17 of the same year. A month later, it was confirmed that Entertainment District Arc would also air which broadcast from January 14 to March 24, 2024.

The third season had aired on Adult Swim's Toonami block from August 11 to October 20, 2024.

Crunchyroll announced that the film trilogy of the manga's "Infinity Castle" story arc will release exclusively to theaters globally.

In the United Kingdom and Ireland, the first season was released on home video by Anime Limited, while later entries have been handled by Crunchyroll. Madman Entertainment acquired the series in Australia and New Zealand and simultaneously streamed the series on AnimeLab.

Muse Communication licensed the second season in Asia-Pacific.

== Music ==
Yuki Kajiura and Go Shiina composed the anime's music. For the first season, LiSA performed the opening theme "Gurenge" (紅蓮華; lit. 'Red Lotus'), while the ending theme is "from the edge" by FictionJunction and LiSA. The ending theme for episode 19 is "Kamado Tanjiro no Uta" (竈門炭治郎のうた; lit. 'Tanjiro Kamado's Song') by Go Shiina featuring Nami Nakagawa. For the second season's Mugen Train Arc, LiSA performed the opening theme "Akeboshi" (明け星; lit. 'Morning Star'), as well as the ending theme "Shirogane" (白銀; lit. 'Silver'). For the Entertainment District Arc, Aimer performed the opening theme "Zankyōsanka" (残響散歌; lit. 'Song of Reverberation'), as well as the ending theme "Asa ga Kuru" (朝が来る; lit. 'Daybreak').

For the third season's Swordsmith Village Arc, Man with a Mission and Milet performed the opening theme "Kizuna no Kiseki" (絆ノ奇跡; lit. 'Bonds of Miracle'), as well as the ending theme "Koi Kogare" (コイコガレ; lit. 'Yearning'). The last episode of the season features the song "Kamado Nezuko no Uta" (竈門襧豆子のうた; lit. 'Nezuko Kamado's Song') by Go Shiina featuring Nami Nakagawa. For the fourth season's Hashira Training Arc, My First Story and Hyde performed the opening theme "Mugen" (夢幻; lit. 'Dreams'), as well as the ending theme "Tokoshie" (トコシエ; lit. 'Eternity').

== Reception ==
=== Viewership ===
The anime had received high TV rating percentage and has consistently ranked among the top ten animated shows in Japan, since the release of second season's Mugen Train and Entertainment District story arcs. According to Video Research, Entertainment District Arc averaged 18.43 million viewers, with 25.5 million for episode 10 and 25.97 million for episode 11. The Swordsmith Village Arc's final episode averaged 22.87 million viewers, while the double feature special of the anime's Entertainment District Arc drew 22.51 million after their broadcast. The final episode of Swordsmith Village Arc became the most-watched anime episode in 2023, garnering 15.4 million viewers in Japan.

=== Popularity and cultural impact ===
Gadget Tsūshin listed both the breathing techniques suffix and "Ah! The era, the era changed again!" on their 2019 anime buzzwords list. On Tumblr's Year in Review, which highlights the largest communities, fandoms, and trends on the platform throughout the year, Demon Slayer: Kimetsu no Yaiba ranked seventh on the Top Anime & Manga Shows category in 2019 and 2020. The second season's Mugen Train placed third on the annual Twitter Japan's Trend Awards in 2021, based on the social network's top trending topics of the year. According to a 2020 poll conducted by education and publishing company Benesse, which asked 7,661 third to sixth-grade Japanese children (5,170 girls and 2,491 boys), Tanjiro Kamado ranked first on the top 10 most admired people, which placed the children's mothers, fathers, and teachers on second, fourth and fifth place, respectively, with the remaining spots occupied by other Demon Slayer: Kimetsu no Yaiba characters. The series helped to increase internal tourism, with many tourists traveling to similar spots to the ones featured in the series.

According to Yuma Takahashi, Demon Slayer: Kimetsu no Yaiba anime series producer, the series had three main factors for its success: "The power of the original work, the attitude towards adapting it to anime, and the environment". Takahashi explained that although many people learned about the manga through the anime, that in itself is not enough to generate a hit, stating that the original manga itself is interesting and they tried to adapt it earnestly without losing any of its appeal. The earnest attitude towards the adaptation and techniques from the staff at Ufotable were other key factors. Takahashi pointed out the changes in the anime-viewing landscape within the past few years and the increasing popularity of the streaming platforms. Takahashi said that by airing the series for two cours, it had the time to build up an audience. Takahashi added: "While the anime was airing, the story being serialized in the manga was heating up, so the timing was also ideal. It wasn't as if it suddenly became the center of attention; I feel that it steadily picked up fans and expanded its audience". In 2021, in Tokushima, the Red Cross featured characters from the series on blood drive posters, which helped to increase the number of donors.

In January 2021, Gundam franchise's creator Yoshiyuki Tomino discussed his thoughts on the series in an interview, where he said that he initially felt jealous of how the series attracted "such a dedicated and talented staff", and said: "The voice actors are great, the composer of the song that everyone knows is great. So many talented people showed up! In that sense, what I felt surpassed envy, and I started thinking, 'Man, those guys sure are something!'". Nevertheless, Tomino called the series cultural success a coincidence, explaining: "I don't think that Demon Slayer is a calculated or contrived work. I think that its assemblage was quite a coincidence", adding that in the anime industry people often get chosen for a job because they "just happened to be there" or their schedules "happened to align at the right time" and that it is rare for people with exactly the ideal talents or innate qualities to get chosen.

Former prime minister of Japan Yoshihide Suga quoted the series at a House of Representatives Budget Committee in the National Diet in November 2020. Former prime minister Fumio Kishida has remarked that he was a fan of the series, pledging that he would improve the conditions in the anime and manga industry. Several politicians even used motifs and patterns from the series in their campaigns in 2021.

=== Critical reception ===
On review aggregator website Rotten Tomatoes, the first season of Demon Slayer: Kimetsu no Yaiba holds an approval rating of 100% based on six reviews. Writing for Monsters and Critics, Patrick Frye wrote that the anime adaptation is "praised [for] the animation quality and flowing battle scenes that integrate digital effects seamlessly" while noting that "some fans have complained about weird story pacing issues thanks to flashbacks and some slow moments, but everyone agrees that once the action picks up, it's amazing." Writing for Anime News Network, James Beckett highlighted the 19th episode by noting it was "a thrilling showstopper of an episode, showing off ufotable's considerable skills as producers of nearly unrivaled action spectacle."

The anime series has been considered as one of the best anime of the 2010s. Polygon's Austen Goslin wrote that "Few shows over the last 10 years have so clearly or unabashedly made fights their focus, and absolutely none of them have done it as well as Demon Slayer". Crunchyroll listed it in their "Top 25 best anime of the 2010s", with reviewer Daniel Dockery commenting, "From the top-notch action choreography to the understated (and sometimes not so understated) emotional moments, to the infinitely meme-able Inosuke, Demon Slayer can be a wonder to behold". Writing for Comic Book Resources, Sage Ashford ranked it second on his list, praising its animation and protagonists, whom he called "the most likable male and female leads of the decade". IGN also listed Demon Slayer: Kimetsu no Yaiba among the best anime series of the 2010s. Japan Web Magazine ranked the series first on its list of "30 Best Anime of All Time".

=== Accolades ===
In 2019, Demon Slayer: Kimetsu no Yaiba won in the anime category of the Yahoo! Japan Search Awards, based on the number of searches for a particular term compared to the year before; the series won the award for the second consecutive year in 2020; it was third in 2021, and its Swordsmith Village Arc was fifth in 2023. Demon Slayer: Kimetsu no Yaiba won "Animation of the Decade" at the Funimation's Decade of Anime poll, where the fans voted for their favorite anime across multiple categories. In the other fan poll, Tanjiro and Nezuko Kamado were chosen as one of the "Best Boys" and "Best Girls" honorees, respectively. In the February 2020 issue of Animedia magazine, it was revealed that the series received eleven awards for its characters at the "Animedia Character Awards 2019". Having won the most awards in a single year in animedia history.

In a poll conducted by Kadokawa Game Linkage of the most satisfying series of 2019, Demon Slayer: Kimetsu no Yaiba ranked in the first place, and it was also reported that between its debut episode and last episode the viewership numbers increased by 1.4 million. In April 2020, the anime series won the Grand Prix award and the New Face Award at the Japan Character Awards by Japan's Character Brand Licensing Association (CBLA). In 2020, the series became one of five recipients of the Special Achievement Award at the 62nd Japan Record Awards. In 2021, the series won "Most Retweeted" for its announcement of the Entertainment District Arc on the annual Twitter Japan's Trend Awards.

=== Awards and nominations ===
Year	Award	Category	Recipient	Result	Ref.
2019	9th Newtype Anime Awards	Best Work (TV)	Demon Slayer: Kimetsu no Yaiba	Won	
2019	9th Newtype Anime Awards	Best Character (Male)	Tanjiro Kamado	Won	
2019	9th Newtype Anime Awards	Best Character (Female)	Nezuko Kamado	Won	
2019	9th Newtype Anime Awards	Best Voice Actor	Natsuki Hanae	Won	
2019	9th Newtype Anime Awards	Best Voice Actor	Hiro Shimono	5th place	
2019	9th Newtype Anime Awards	Best Voice Actress	Akari Kitō	Won	
2019	9th Newtype Anime Awards	Best Voice Actress	Mikako Komatsu	2nd place	
2019	9th Newtype Anime Awards	Best Voice Actress	Saori Hayami	4th place	
2019	9th Newtype Anime Awards	Best Voice Actress	Kana Hanazawa	5th place	
2019	9th Newtype Anime Awards	Best Theme Song	"Gurenge" by LiSA	Won	
2019	9th Newtype Anime Awards	Best Director	Haruo Sotozaki	Won	
2019	9th Newtype Anime Awards	Best Character Design	Akira Matsushima, Miyuki Satō, Yōko Kajiyama, Mika Kikuchi	Won	
2019	9th Newtype Anime Awards	Best Mascot Character	Chuntaro	2nd place	
2019	9th Newtype Anime Awards	Best Screenplay	Ufotable	2nd place	
2019	9th Newtype Anime Awards	Best Soundtrack	Yuki Kajiura, Go Shiina	2nd place	
2019	Yahoo! Japan Search Awards	Anime Category	Demon Slayer: Kimetsu no Yaiba	Won	
2019	Billboard Japan Music Awards	Hot Animation	"Gurenge" by LiSA	3rd place	
2019	Reiwa Anisong Awards	Best Anime Song Award	"Gurenge" by LiSA	Won	
2019	Reiwa Anisong Awards	User Voting Award	"Gurenge" by LiSA	Won	
2019	Reiwa Anisong Awards	Jury Voting Award	"Gurenge" by LiSA	Won	
2019	IGN Awards	Best Anime Series	Demon Slayer: Kimetsu no Yaiba	Nominated	
2019	IGN Awards	Best Anime Series - People's Choice	Demon Slayer: Kimetsu no Yaiba	Runner-up	
2019	IGN Awards	Best Animation	Demon Slayer: Kimetsu no Yaiba	Nominated	
2019	IGN Awards	Best Animation - People's Choice	Demon Slayer: Kimetsu no Yaiba	Won	
2019	Funimation	Animation of the Decade	Demon Slayer: Kimetsu no Yaiba	Won	
2019	Funimation	Best Boys of the Decade	Tanjiro Kamado	Won	
2019	Funimation	Best Girls of the Decade	Nezuko Kamado	Won	
2019	AT-X	Top Anime Ranking	Demon Slayer: Kimetsu no Yaiba	Won	
2020	Animedia Character Awards	Most Valuable Player	Tanjiro Kamado	Won	
2020	Animedia Character Awards	bright	Tanjiro Kamado	Won	
2020	Animedia Character Awards	courageous	Tanjiro Kamado	Won	
2020	Animedia Character Awards	Strong	Giyu Tomioka	Won	
2020	Animedia Character Awards	Cool	Giyu Tomioka	Won	
2020	Animedia Character Awards	Mysterious	Giyu Tomioka	Won	
2020	Animedia Character Awards	Hot	Kyojuro Rengoku	Won	
2020	Animedia Character Awards	Cute	Nezuko Kamado	Won	
2020	Animedia Character Awards	Beautiful	Shinobu Kocho	Won	
2020	Animedia Character Awards	Sexy	Mitsuri Kanroji	Won	
2020	Animedia Character Awards	Cute and bratty	Zenitsu Agatsuma	Won	
2020	Tokyo Anime Awards	Animation of the Year	Demon Slayer: Kimetsu no Yaiba	Won	
2020	Tokyo Anime Awards	Best Script & Original Story	Koyoharu Gotouge	Won	
2020	Tokyo Anime Awards	Best Animator	Akira Matsushima	Won	
2020	Tokyo Anime Awards	Sound and Performance Award	Yuki Kajiura	Won	
2020	TAAF 2020 with Bilibili	Anime of the Year	Demon Slayer: Kimetsu no Yaiba	Won	
2020	D-Anime Store Awards	Recommended Anime	Demon Slayer: Kimetsu no Yaiba	Won	
2020	D-Anime Store Awards	Best Story	Demon Slayer: Kimetsu no Yaiba	Won	
2020	D-Anime Store Awards	Hottest Anime	Demon Slayer: Kimetsu no Yaiba	Won	
2020	4th Crunchyroll Anime Awards	Anime of the Year	Demon Slayer: Kimetsu no Yaiba	Won	
2020	4th Crunchyroll Anime Awards	Best Protagonist	Tanjiro Kamado	Nominated	
2020	4th Crunchyroll Anime Awards	Best Boy	Tanjiro Kamado	Won	
2020	4th Crunchyroll Anime Awards	Best Girl	Nezuko Kamado	Nominated	
2020	4th Crunchyroll Anime Awards	Best Animation	Demon Slayer: Kimetsu no Yaiba	Nominated	
2020	4th Crunchyroll Anime Awards	Best Fantasy	Demon Slayer: Kimetsu no Yaiba	Nominated	
2020	4th Crunchyroll Anime Awards	Best Score	Go Shiina and Yuki Kajiura	Nominated	
2020	4th Crunchyroll Anime Awards	Best Fight Scene	Tanjiro & Nezuko vs. Rui	Won	
2020	4th Crunchyroll Anime Awards	Best VA Performance (Japanese)	Saori Hayami as Shinobu Kocho	Nominated	
2020	14th Seiyu Awards	Best Actor in a Leading Role	Natsuki Hanae as Tanjiro Kamado	Won	
2020	14th Seiyu Awards	Synergy Award	Demon Slayer: Kimetsu no Yaiba	Won	
2020	Japan Character Awards	Grand Prize	Demon Slayer: Kimetsu no Yaiba	Won	
2020	Japan Character Awards	New Face Award	Demon Slayer: Kimetsu no Yaiba	Won	
2020	15th AnimaniA Awards	Best Online Series	Demon Slayer: Kimetsu no Yaiba	Won	
2020	42nd Anime Grand Prix	Grand Prix	Demon Slayer: Kimetsu no Yaiba	Won	
2020	42nd Anime Grand Prix	Best Character (Male)	Tanjiro Kamado	Won	
2020	42nd Anime Grand Prix	Best Character (Male)	Giyu Tomioka	2nd place	
2020	42nd Anime Grand Prix	Best Character (Female)	Nezuko Kamado	2nd place	
2020	42nd Anime Grand Prix	Best Character (Female)	Shinobu Kocho	3rd place	
2020	42nd Anime Grand Prix	Best Voice Actor	Natsuki Hanae	Won	
2020	42nd Anime Grand Prix	Best Theme Song	"Gurenge" by LiSA	Won	
2020	Magnolia Award	Best Animation	Demon Slayer: Kimetsu no Yaiba	Nominated	
2020	25th AMD Awards	Excellence Award	Demon Slayer: Kimetsu no Yaiba	Won	
2020	Internet Buzzword Awards	Grand Prize	Demon Slayer: Kimetsu no Yaiba	Won	
2020	Anime Buzzword Awards	Grand Prize	Breathing	Won	
2020	Anime Buzzword Awards	Silver Prize	Total Concentration	Won	
2020	Anime Buzzword Awards	Bronze Prize	Mr.Kyojuro Rengoku, the 20 billion man.	Won	
2020	Billboard Japan Music Awards	Hot 100	"Gurenge" by LiSA	3rd place	
2020	Billboard Japan Music Awards	Most Downloaded Songs	"Gurenge" by LiSA	Won	
2020	Billboard Japan Music Awards	Hot Animation	"Gurenge" by LiSA	Won	
2020	Yahoo! Japan Search Awards	Anime Category	Demon Slayer: Kimetsu no Yaiba	Won	
2020	Yahoo! Japan Search Awards	Movie Category	Demon Slayer: Kimetsu no Yaiba	Won	
2020	Yahoo! Japan Search Awards	Voice Actor Category	Natsuki Hanae	Won	
2020	62nd Japan Record Awards	Grand Prize	"Homura" by LiSA	Won	
2020	62nd Japan Record Awards	Excellent Work Awards	"Homura" by LiSA	Won	
2020	62nd Japan Record Awards	Special Achievement Award	Demon Slayer: Kimetsu no Yaiba	Won	
2020	AT-X	Top Anime Ranking	Demon Slayer: Kimetsu no Yaiba	Won	
2021	Tokyo Anime Awards	Best Animator	Akira Matsushima	Won	
2021	Tokyo Anime Awards	Best Director	Haruo Sotozaki	Won	
2021	Tokyo Anime Awards	Sound and Performance Award	Yuki Kajiura	Won	
2021	15th Seiyu Awards	Special Honor Award	Demon Slayer: Kimetsu no Yaiba	Won	
2021	39th JASRAC Awards	Gold Award	"Gurenge" by LiSA	Won	
2021	16th AnimaniA Awards	Best TV Series	Demon Slayer: Kimetsu no Yaiba	Won	
2021	16th AnimaniA Awards	Best Director	Haruo Sotozaki	Won	
2021	16th AnimaniA Awards	Best Character Design	Akira Matsushima	Won	
2021	16th AnimaniA Awards	Best Studio	Ufotable	Won	
2021	16th AnimaniA Awards	Best Anime Score	Go Shiina and Yuki Kajiura	Won	
2021	16th AnimaniA Awards	Best Anime Song	"Gurenge" by LiSA	Won	
2021	43rd Anime Grand Prix	Best Character (Male)	Kyojuro Rengoku	Won	
2021	43rd Anime Grand Prix	Best Theme Song	"Homura" by LiSA	Won	
2021	Yahoo! Japan Search Awards	Anime Category	Demon Slayer: Kimetsu no Yaiba	3rd place	
2021	Reiwa Anisong Awards	Artist Song Award	"Akeboshi" by LiSA	Nominated	
2021	Twitter Japan's Trend Awards	Most Retweeted	Entertainment District Arc	Won	
2021	63rd Japan Record Awards	Song of the Year	"Akeboshi" by LiSA	Won	
2022	28th Manga Barcelona Awards	Best Anime Series In Physical Format (BR/DVD)	Demon Slayer: Kimetsu no Yaiba(Collector's Edition)	Won	
2022	6th Crunchyroll Anime Awards	Best Animation	Demon Slayer: Kimetsu no Yaiba Mugen Train Arc	Won	
2022	6th Crunchyroll Anime Awards	Best Action	Demon Slayer: Kimetsu no Yaiba Mugen Train Arc	Nominated	
2022	6th Crunchyroll Anime Awards	Best Score	Yuki Kajiura and Go Shiina	Won	
2022	6th Crunchyroll Anime Awards	Best Ending Sequence	"Shirogane" by LiSA	Won	
2022	6th Crunchyroll Anime Awards	Best VA Performance (French)	Enzo Ratsito as Tanjiro Kamado	Won	
2022	6th Crunchyroll Anime Awards	Best VA Performance (Spanish)	Irwin Daayán as Kyojuro Rengoku	Won	
2022	36th Japan Gold Disc Awards	Animation Album of the Year	Demon Slayer: Kimetsu no Yaiba	Won	
2022	40th JASRAC Awards	Gold Award	"Gurenge" by LiSA	Won	
2022	40th JASRAC Awards	Silver Award	"Homura" by LiSA	Won	
2022	Japan Expo Awards	Best Anime of the Year	Demon Slayer: Kimetsu no Yaiba Entertainment District Arc	Won	
2022	Japan Expo Awards	Daruma for Best Action Anime	Demon Slayer: Kimetsu no Yaiba Entertainment District Arc	Won	
2022	Japan Expo Awards	Daruma for Best Original Soundtrack	Demon Slayer: Kimetsu no Yaiba Entertainment District Arc	Won	
2022	Japan Expo Awards	Daruma for Best Director	Haruo Sotozaki	Won	
2022	44th Anime Grand Prix	Grand Prix	Demon Slayer: Kimetsu no Yaiba Mugen Train Arc; Demon Slayer: Kimetsu no Yaiba Entertainment District Arc	2nd place	
2022	44th Anime Grand Prix	Best Character (Male)	Tengen Uzui	Won	
2022	44th Anime Grand Prix	Best Character (Male)	Zenitsu Agatsuma	4th place	
2022	44th Anime Grand Prix	Best Character (Male)	Gyutaro	7th place	
2022	44th Anime Grand Prix	Best Character (Female)	Nezuko Kamado	Won	
2022	44th Anime Grand Prix	Best Character (Female)	Daki	2nd place	
2022	44th Anime Grand Prix	Best Voice Actor	Miyuki Sawashiro	4th place	
2022	44th Anime Grand Prix	Best Theme Song	"Zankyō Sanka" by Aimer	Won	
2022	44th Anime Grand Prix	Best Theme Song	"Akeboshi" by LiSA	3rd place	
2022	MTV Video Music Awards Japan	Best Solo Artist Video (Japan)	"Zankyō Sanka" by Aimer	Won	
2022	12th Newtype Anime Awards	Best Work (TV)	Demon Slayer: Kimetsu no Yaiba Entertainment District Arc	Won	
2022	12th Newtype Anime Awards	Best Character (Male)	Tengen Uzui	5th place	
2022	12th Newtype Anime Awards	Best Character (Female)	Nezuko Kamado	5th place	
2022	12th Newtype Anime Awards	Best Voice Actor	Yoshitsugu Matsuoka	Won	
2022	12th Newtype Anime Awards	Best Voice Actor	Natsuki Hanae	3rd place	
2022	12th Newtype Anime Awards	Best Theme Song	"Zankyō Sanka" by Aimer	4th place	
2022	12th Newtype Anime Awards	Best Director	Haruo Sotozaki	Won	
2022	12th Newtype Anime Awards	Best Character Design	Akira Matsushima	5th place	
2022	12th Newtype Anime Awards	Best Mascot Character	Muscular Mice	5th place	
2022	12th Newtype Anime Awards	Best Screenplay	Ufotable	4th place	
2022	12th Newtype Anime Awards	Best Soundtrack	Yuki Kajiura and Go Shiina	2nd place	
2022	12th Newtype Anime Awards	Best Studio	Ufotable	2nd place	
2022	Billboard Japan Music Awards	Hot 100	"Zankyō Sanka" by Aimer	Won	
2022	Billboard Japan Music Awards	Most Downloaded Songs	"Zankyō Sanka" by Aimer	Won	
2022	Billboard Japan Music Awards	Hot Animation	"Zankyō Sanka" by Aimer	Won	
2022	Reiwa Anisong Awards	Arrangement Award	"Zankyō Sanka" by Aimer (Note: Kenji Tamai and Masahiro Hiuchi credited as nominees.)	Nominated	
2023	5th Global Demand Awards	Most In-Demand Anime Series of 2022	Demon Slayer: Kimetsu no Yaiba	Nominated	
2023	7th Crunchyroll Anime Awards	Anime of the Year	Demon Slayer: Kimetsu no Yaiba Entertainment District Arc	Nominated	
2023	7th Crunchyroll Anime Awards	Best Supporting Character	Tengen Uzui	Nominated	
2023	7th Crunchyroll Anime Awards	Best Animation	Demon Slayer: Kimetsu no Yaiba Entertainment District Arc	Won	
2023	7th Crunchyroll Anime Awards	Best Director	Haruo Sotozaki	Won	
2023	7th Crunchyroll Anime Awards	Best Action	Demon Slayer: Kimetsu no Yaiba Entertainment District Arc	Won	
2023	7th Crunchyroll Anime Awards	Best Fantasy	Demon Slayer: Kimetsu no Yaiba Entertainment District Arc	Won	
2023	7th Crunchyroll Anime Awards	Best Continuing Series	Demon Slayer: Kimetsu no Yaiba Entertainment District Arc	Nominated	
2023	7th Crunchyroll Anime Awards	Best Character Design	Akira Matsushima	Won	
2023	7th Crunchyroll Anime Awards	Best Score	Go Shiina and Yuki Kajiura	Nominated	
2023	7th Crunchyroll Anime Awards	Best Opening Sequence	"Zankyō Sanka" by Aimer	Nominated	
2023	7th Crunchyroll Anime Awards	Best VA Performance (Japanese)	Natsuki Hanae as Tanjiro Kamado	Nominated	
2023	7th Crunchyroll Anime Awards	Best VA Performance (Italian)	Andrea La Greca as Kyojuro Rengoku	Nominated	
2023	7th Crunchyroll Anime Awards	Best VA Performance (Spanish)	Alejandro Orozco as Gyutaro	Won	
2023	41st JASRAC Awards	Bronze Award	"Zankyō Sanka" by Aimer	Won	
2023	13th Newtype Anime Awards	Best Work (TV)	Demon Slayer: Kimetsu no Yaiba Swordsmith Village Arc	3rd place	
2023	13th Newtype Anime Awards	Best Character (Male)	Muichiro Tokito	3rd place	
2023	13th Newtype Anime Awards	Best Character (Male)	Tanjiro Kamado	4th place	
2023	13th Newtype Anime Awards	Best Character (Male)	Akaza	5th place	
2023	13th Newtype Anime Awards	Best Character (Female)	Mitsuri Kanroji	7th place	
2023	13th Newtype Anime Awards	Best Theme Song	"Kizuna no Kiseki" by Man with a Mission and Milet	8th place	
2023	13th Newtype Anime Awards	Best Studio	Ufotable	3rd place	
2023	Yahoo! Japan Search Awards	Anime Category	Demon Slayer: Kimetsu no Yaiba Swordsmith Village Arc	5th place	
2024	6th Global Demand Awards	Most In-Demand Anime Series of 2023	Demon Slayer: Kimetsu no Yaiba	Nominated	
2024	8th Crunchyroll Anime Awards	Anime of the Year	Demon Slayer: Kimetsu no Yaiba Swordsmith Village Arc	Nominated	
2024	8th Crunchyroll Anime Awards	Best Action	Demon Slayer: Kimetsu no Yaiba Swordsmith Village Arc	Nominated	
2024	8th Crunchyroll Anime Awards	Best Fantasy	Demon Slayer: Kimetsu no Yaiba Swordsmith Village Arc	Won	
2024	8th Crunchyroll Anime Awards	Best Animation	Demon Slayer: Kimetsu no Yaiba Swordsmith Village Arc	Won	
2024	8th Crunchyroll Anime Awards	Best Continuing Series	Demon Slayer: Kimetsu no Yaiba Swordsmith Village Arc	Nominated	
2024	8th Crunchyroll Anime Awards	Best Character Design	Akira Matsushima	Nominated	
2024	8th Crunchyroll Anime Awards	Best Cinematography	Yuichi Terao	Nominated	
2024	8th Crunchyroll Anime Awards	Best Art Direction	Koji Eto	Won	
2024	8th Crunchyroll Anime Awards	Best Score	Yuki Kajiura and Go Shiina	Nominated	
2024	8th Crunchyroll Anime Awards	Best Ending Sequence	"Koi Kogare" by Man with a Mission and Milet	Nominated	
2024	8th Crunchyroll Anime Awards	Best VA Performance (English)	Abby Trott as Nezuko Kamado	Nominated	
2024	8th Crunchyroll Anime Awards	Best VA Performance (Spanish)	Armando Corona Ibarrola as Muichiro Tokito	Nominated	
2024	38th Japan Gold Disc Awards	Best 3 Songs by Download	"Kizuna no Kiseki" by Man with a Mission and Milet	Won	
2024	46th Anime Grand Prix	Grand Prix	Demon Slayer: Kimetsu no Yaiba Swordsmith Village Arc	8th place	
2025	7th Global Demand Awards	Most In-Demand Anime Series of 2024	Demon Slayer: Kimetsu no Yaiba	Nominated	
2025	9th Crunchyroll Anime Awards	Best Continuing Series	Demon Slayer: Kimetsu no Yaiba Hashira Training Arc	Won	
2025	9th Crunchyroll Anime Awards	Best Action	Demon Slayer: Kimetsu no Yaiba Hashira Training Arc	Nominated	
2025	9th Crunchyroll Anime Awards	Best Animation	Demon Slayer: Kimetsu no Yaiba Hashira Training Arc	Won	
2025	9th Crunchyroll Anime Awards	Best Background Art	Demon Slayer: Kimetsu no Yaiba Hashira Training Arc	Nominated	
2025	9th Crunchyroll Anime Awards	Best Character Design	Akira Matsushima	Nominated	
2025	9th Crunchyroll Anime Awards	Best Director	Haruo Sotozaki	Nominated	
2025	9th Crunchyroll Anime Awards	Best Score	Yuki Kajiura and Go Shiina	Nominated	
2025	9th Crunchyroll Anime Awards	Best VA Performance (Spanish)	Luis Leonardo Suárez as Muzan Kibutsuji	Nominated	
2025	47th Anime Grand Prix	Grand Prix	Demon Slayer: Kimetsu no Yaiba Hashira Training Arc	5th place	
2025	20th AnimaniA Awards	Best Anime Song	"Mugen" by My First Story and Hyde	Nominated	
2026	Music Awards Japan	Best Soundtrack Album	Demon Slayer: Kimetsu no Yaiba Swordsmith Village Arc Original Soundtrack	Nominated	
