= Haruo Sotozaki =

Japanese anime, film and video game director

- 外崎春雄
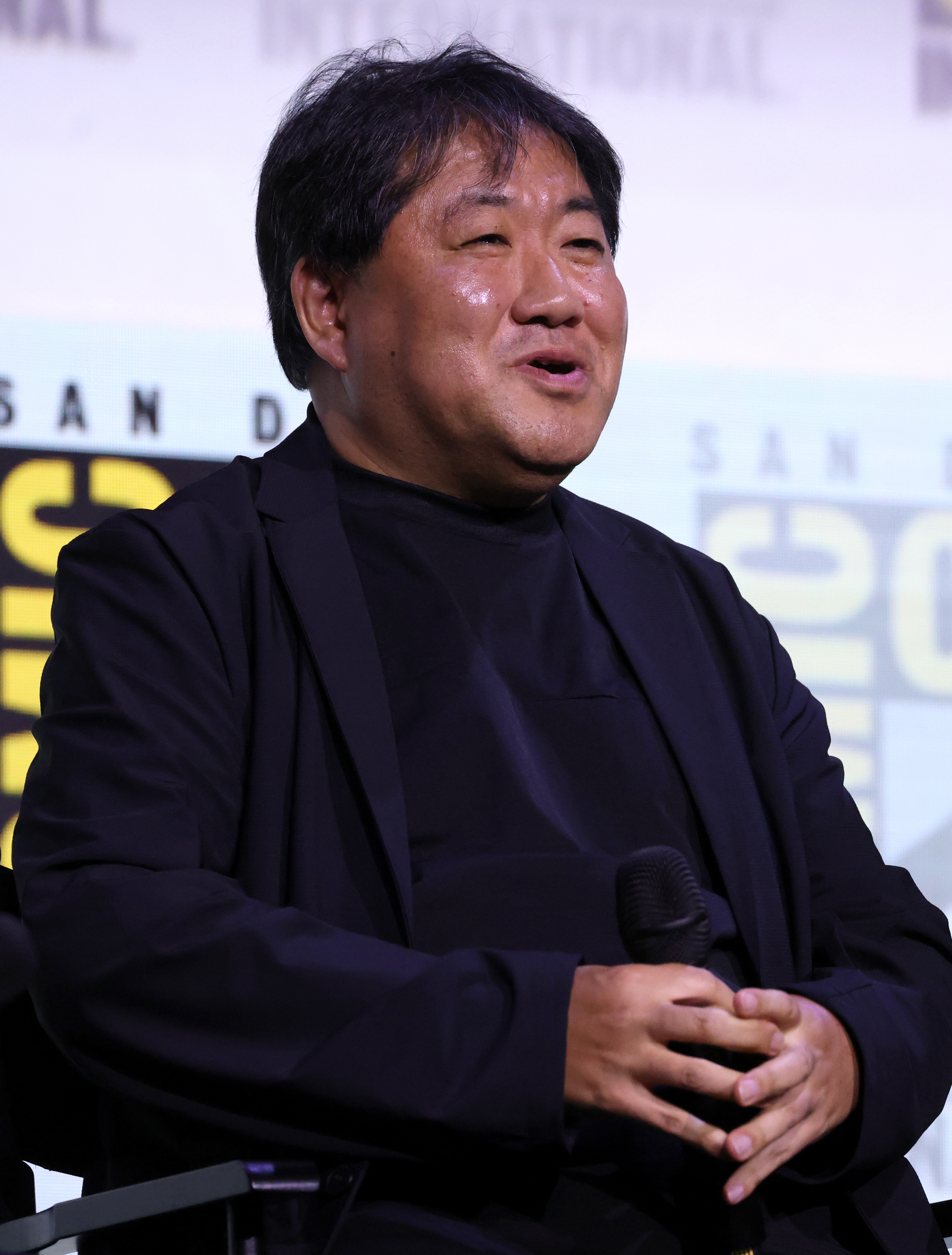
- Sotozaki in 2025
- Occupation: Anime director
- Years active: 1994–present
- Known for: Demon Slayer: Kimetsu no Yaiba

Haruo Sotozaki (Japanese: 外崎春雄, Hepburn: Sotozaki Haruo) is a Japanese anime and film director. He made his full directorial debut in 2004 with the anime adaptation of Ninja Nonsense. In 2019, he directed the anime adaptation of Demon Slayer: Kimetsu no Yaiba, as well as its film, Demon Slayer: Kimetsu no Yaiba – The Movie: Mugen Train in 2020, which has earned numerous awards.

== Works ==
=== TV series ===
- X (2002–2003) (episode director)
- Ninja Nonsense (ニニンがシノブ伝, Ninin ga Shinobuden) (2004) (director)
- Tales of Symphonia: The Animation (テイルズ オブ シンフォニア The Animation, Teiruzu Obu Shinfonia The Animation) (2007–2012) (director)
- Tales of Zestiria the X (テイルズ オブ ゼスティリア ザ クロス, Teiruzu Obu Zesutiria Za Kurosu) (2016–2017) (director)
- Demon Slayer: Kimetsu no Yaiba (鬼滅の刃, Kimetsu no Yaiba) (2019–2024) (director)

=== Films ===
- Demon Slayer: Kimetsu no Yaiba – The Movie: Mugen Train (劇場版「鬼滅の刃」 無限列車編, Gekijō-ban "Kimetsu no Yaiba" Mugen Ressha-hen) (2020) (director)
- Demon Slayer: Kimetsu no Yaiba – The Movie: Infinity Castle (劇場版「鬼滅の刃」 無限城編, Gekijō-ban "Kimetsu no Yaiba" Mugen Jō-hen) (2025) (director)

=== Video games ===
- Disgaea 2: Cursed Memories (魔界戦記ディスガイア2, Makai Senki Disugaia Tsū) (2006) (animation part director, character designer, scenarist, cinematographer, animation director, opening animator)

== Awards and nominations ==
Year	Award	Category	Work/Recipient	Result	Ref.
2019	9th Newtype Anime Awards	Best Director	Demon Slayer: Kimetsu no Yaiba	Won	
2020	4th Crunchyroll Anime Awards	Anime of the Year	Demon Slayer: Kimetsu no Yaiba	Won	
2020	Tokyo Anime Awards Festival	Best Television Animation	Demon Slayer: Kimetsu no Yaiba	Won	
2020	45th Hochi Film Award	Best Animation Film	Demon Slayer: Kimetsu no Yaiba – The Movie: Mugen Train	Won	
2020	Nikkan Sports Film Award for Yūjirō Ishihara Award	Best Director	Demon Slayer: Kimetsu no Yaiba – The Movie: Mugen Train	Won	
2021	44th Japan Academy Film Prize	Animation of the Year	Demon Slayer: Kimetsu no Yaiba – The Movie: Mugen Train	Won	
2021	Mainichi Film Awards	Best Animation Film	Demon Slayer: Kimetsu no Yaiba – The Movie: Mugen Train	Nominated	
2021	25th Satellite Awards	Best Motion Picture, Animated or Mixed Media	Demon Slayer: Kimetsu no Yaiba – The Movie: Mugen Train	Nominated	
2021	Tokyo Anime Awards Festival	Best Director	Demon Slayer: Kimetsu no Yaiba – The Movie: Mugen Train	Won	
2021	11th Newtype Anime Awards	Best Director	Demon Slayer: Kimetsu no Yaiba – The Movie: Mugen Train	Won	
2022	12th Newtype Anime Awards	Best Director	Demon Slayer: Kimetsu no Yaiba – Mugen Train Arc; Demon Slayer: Kimetsu no Yaiba – Entertainment District Arc	Won	
2023	7th Crunchyroll Anime Awards	Best Director	Demon Slayer: Kimetsu no Yaiba – Entertainment District Arc	Won	
2025	9th Crunchyroll Anime Awards	Best Director	Demon Slayer: Kimetsu no Yaiba – Hashira Training Arc	Nominated	
2026	83rd Golden Globe Awards	Best Motion Picture – Animated	Demon Slayer: Kimetsu no Yaiba – The Movie: Infinity Castle	Nominated	
