= Demon Slayer: Kimetsu no Yaiba – The Movie: Mugen Train =

2020 Japanese animated film by Haruo Sotozaki

- Theatrical release poster
- Kanji: 劇場版「鬼滅の刃」無限列車編
- Revised Hepburn: Gekijō-ban Kimetsu no Yaiba: Mugen Ressha-hen
- Directed by: Haruo Sotozaki
- Screenplay by: Ufotable
- Based on: Demon Slayer: Kimetsu no Yaiba by Koyoharu Gotouge
- Produced by: Akifumi Fujio; Masanori Miyake; Yūma Takahashi
- Starring: Natsuki Hanae; Akari Kitō; Yoshitsugu Matsuoka; Hiro Shimono; Satoshi Hino
- Cinematography: Yuichi Terao
- Edited by: Manabu Kamino
- Music by: Yuki Kajiura; Go Shiina
- Production company: Ufotable
- Distributed by: Aniplex; Toho
- Release date: October 16, 2020 (Japan)
- Running time: 119 minutes
- Country: Japan
- Language: Japanese
- Box office: $512.7 million

Demon Slayer: Kimetsu no Yaiba – The Movie: Mugen Train (Japanese: 劇場版「鬼滅の刃」無限列車編, Hepburn: Gekijō-ban Kimetsu no Yaiba: Mugen Ressha-hen), is a 2020 Japanese animated dark fantasy action film based on the "Mugen Train" arc of the 2016–20 manga series Demon Slayer: Kimetsu no Yaiba by Koyoharu Gotouge. It is a direct sequel to the first season of the anime television series as well as its first film adaptation. The film was directed by Haruo Sotozaki and produced by Ufotable, and written by the studio's staff members.

Demon Slayer: Kimetsu no Yaiba – The Movie: Mugen Train was released during the COVID-19 pandemic, premiering in Japan on October 16, 2020, by Aniplex and Toho, and late 2020 to mid-2021 outside Japan by Crunchyroll through Sony Pictures Releasing. The film was a critical and commercial success, grossing over $512.7 million worldwide and making it the highest-grossing film of 2020. It marked the first time ever that a non-American production topped the annual global box office, and it set a number of other box office records, including the highest-grossing Japanese film both in Japan and worldwide, two titles previously held by Spirited Away (2001) and Your Name (2016), respectively, until it was surpassed in 2025 by the later installment, Infinity Castle – Part 1: Akaza Returns, as the highest grossing Japanese film worldwide. It was also the first Japanese film to surpass the half-billion dollar mark. It also has received numerous awards, including Animation of the Year at the 44th Japan Academy Film Prize, Best Film at the 6th Crunchyroll Anime Awards, and Best Animation Film at the 45th Hochi Film Award.

A sequel set after the events of the one season, Demon Slayer: Kimetsu no Yaiba – To the Swordsmith Village, was released on February 3, 2023, with a third film set after the events of the third season, Demon Slayer: Kimetsu no Yaiba – To the Hashira Training, released on February 2, 2024. A film trilogy titled Infinity Castle, set after the events of the fourth season has been confirmed, with the first installment, Part 1: Akaza Returns, released on July 18, 2025.

== Plot ==
Demon Slayer Corps leader Kagaya Ubuyashiki and his wife Amane visits a graveyard where fallen Demon Slayers are buried. Lamenting those who died in the war against Muzan Kibutsuji, he declares that the human spirit will always rise to the challenge.

Tanjiro Kamado, his demon sister Nezuko, and his friends Zenitsu Agatsuma and Inosuke Hashibira board the Mugen Train to assist Flame Hashira Kyojuro Rengoku in finding a demon onboard. (Note: As depicted in the final episode of the first season of the anime series.) When two demons appear, Kyojuro kills them and they are awed by his power and skill. Later, all of them fall into a deep sleep, the work of Enmu, Lower Rank One of Muzan Kibitsuji's Twelve Kizuki.

Enmu instructs four insomniac passengers to enter their dreams and destroy their spiritual cores, in exchange for a peaceful sleep. The Demon Slayers have idealistic dreams; Tanjiro reunites with his deceased family, Kyojuro reminisces on his past with his brother and father, Zenitsu envisions a life with Nezuko, and Inosuke imagines himself as a leader. The intruders fail to destroy their cores, while Tanjiro, aided by the unaffected Nezuko, realizes that he is dreaming. He abandons his family and wakes up when a vision of his father instructs him to commit suicide.

Nezuko uses her pyrokinetic Blood Demon Art to sever the intruders' connection to the others. Angered at being denied their own dreams, they attack Tanjiro, who knocks them unconscious except his intruder, after he refused to harm him despite suffering from tuberculosis. While Nezuko wakes up the others, Tanjiro confronts and beheads Enmu, but he is revealed to have fused with the train and prepares to devour the passengers.

Kyojuro Rengoku instructs Inosuke Hashibira and Tanjiro Kamado to cut Enmu's neck as he, Nezuko Kamado, and Zenitsu Agatsuma protects the passengers. They find it in the locomotive but are attacked by its defenses, including a Blood Demon Art that puts them to sleep. The conductor, under Enmu's control, stabs Tanjiro in his stomach amidst the chaos. With his mask making him immune to Emnu's attacks, Inosuke exposes his vertebra. Tanjiro slashes it with his newfound Hinokami Kagura, killing Enmu and derailing the train. As Tanjiro attempts to recover from his wound, Kyojuro teaches him how to stabilize it with his breathing techniques.

They are then confronted by Upper Rank Three Akaza, who tries to persuade Kyojuro into becoming a demon. Kyojuro refuses and fights Akaza, but he cannot overcome his regeneration and is severely wounded as Tanjiro and Inosuke look on. After attempting his most powerful move as a last resort, Akaza fatally injures him by impaling his solar plexus. With his remaining strength, Kyojuro attempts to restrain Akaza until sunrise and sever his neck, but Akaza breaks free and flees into a nearby forest.

In desperation, Tanjiro throws his sword at Akaza and impales his chest, though he escapes. He breaks down, calling the demon a coward and declaring Kyojuro victorious for fulfilling his duty to keep everyone safe. In his last moments, Kyojuro tells Tanjiro to visit his family's estate to ascertain writings from the past Flame Hashiras, which may help him learn about his Hinokami Kagura. He encourages Tanjiro and his friends to continue on their paths to greater strength, telling them to never give up in protecting others, before succumbing to his injuries and reuniting with his mother in the afterlife.

While Tanjiro and his friends mourn Kyojuro's death, the Hashira receive the news. Kagaya honors him for not letting anyone else die in his presence, stating that he will be glad to reunite with him when he too passes. Known as the saddest season..

== Voice cast ==
Character	Japanese	English
Tanjiro Kamado (竈門 炭治郎, Kamado Tanjirō)	Natsuki Hanae	Zach Aguilar
Nezuko Kamado (竈門 禰豆子, Kamado Nezuko)	Akari Kitō	Abby Trott
Zenitsu Agatsuma (我妻 善逸, Agatsuma Zenitsu)	Hiro Shimono	Aleks Le
Inosuke Hashibira (嘴平 伊之助, Hashibira Inosuke)	Yoshitsugu Matsuoka	Bryce Papenbrook
Kyojuro Rengoku (煉獄 杏寿郎, Rengoku Kyōjurō)	Satoshi Hino	Mark Whitten
Enmu / Lower Rank 1 (魘夢, Enmu)	Daisuke Hirakawa	Landon McDonald
Akaza / Upper Rank 3 (猗窩座, Akaza)	Akira Ishida	Lucien Dodge
Ruka Rengoku (煉獄 瑠火, Rengoku Ruka)	Megumi Toyoguchi	Suzie Yeung
Shinjuro Rengoku (煉獄 槇寿郎, Rengoku Shinjurō)	Rikiya Koyama	Imari Williams
Senjurō Rengoku (煉獄 千寿郎, Rengoku Senjuro)	Junya Enoki	Cedric Williams
Tanjuro Kamado (竈門 炭十郎, Kamado Tanjūrō)	Shin-ichiro Miki	Kirk Thornton
Kie Kamado (竈門 葵枝, Kamado Kie)	Houko Kuwashima	Dorothy Elias-Fahn
Takeo Kamado (竈門 竹雄, Kamado Takeo)	Yō Taichi	Michelle Ruff
Hanako Kamado (竈門 花子, Kamado Hanako)	Konomi Kohara	Ryan Bartley
Shigeru Kamado (竈門 茂, Kamado Shigeru)	Kaede Hondo	Jessica DiCicco
Rokuta Kamado (竈門 六太, Kamado Rokuta)	Aoi Koga	Philece Sampler
Shinobu Kocho (胡蝶 しのぶ, Kochō Shinobu)	Saori Hayami	Erika Harlacher
Gyomei Himejima (悲鳴嶼 行冥, Himejima Gyōmei)	Tomokazu Sugita	Crispin Freeman
Tengen Uzui (宇髄 天元, Uzui Tengen)	Katsuyuki Konishi	Ray Chase
Sanemi Shinazugawa (不死川 実弥, Shinazugawa Sanemi)	Tomokazu Seki	Kaiji Tang
Obanai Iguro (伊黒 小芭内, Iguro Obanai)	Kenichi Suzumura	Erik Scott Kimerer
Giyu Tomioka (富岡 義勇, Tomioka Giyū)	Takahiro Sakurai	Johnny Yong Bosch
Kagaya Ubuyashiki (産屋敷 耀哉, Ubuyashiki Kagaya)	Toshiyuki Morikawa	Matthew Mercer
Amane Ubuyashiki (産屋敷 天音, Ubuyashiki Amane)	Rina Satō	Suzie Yeung

== Production ==
Yūma Takahashi, the producer of the anime series, indicated a desire to continue production of the series with the Ufotable Production Team. The sequel project was greenlit following the success of the television series. A film was determined to be the best format for the "Mugen Train" arc due to the arc's shorter content and dramatic pacing. The main cast was made aware of the film project midway through the first season of the television series. The main production staff from the anime television series, as well as the cast, were carried over into the film's production. Haruo Sotozaki served as director, with Akira Matsushima and Manabu Kamino serving as animator and editor of the film, respectively. The film was announced on September 28, 2019, immediately following the airing of the anime series' season finale.

== Release ==
=== Theatrical ===
The film was released theatrically in Japan on October 16, 2020. Because other major releases had been delayed as a result of the COVID-19 pandemic, the number of available screens was higher than usual. The film opened in 403 cinemas total, including all 38 IMAX cinemas within the country. The film had a very staggered international release, being released from as early as October 30, 2020, in Taiwan, to as late as August 13, 2021, in India. The theatrical release in China was delayed when a controversy surrounding the film Monster Hunter led the Chinese censors to review some foreign films a second time.

=== Home media ===
The film was released on Blu-ray and DVD in Japan on June 16, 2021; it sold over 800,000 units in its first day and over 1 million units in three days. In North America, the film was released digitally on June 22, 2021; pre-orders began on April 26, 2021. On April 26, 2021, two months before its official release, the film was accidentally made available for purchase on the PlayStation Store for a few hours before being removed, resulting in leaked copies being distributed across the Internet. Upon its video-on-demand (VOD) release in North America, the film debuted at number one on the Vudu, Google Play and YouTube charts. A novel adaptation was released on October 16, 2020.

=== Television series version ===
The first part of the second season of the anime television series, subtitled Mugen Train Arc, is an extended and recompiled version of the film that ran for a total of seven episodes. The first episode of the part is an entirely new episode that focuses on what Kyojuro did immediately before the events of the film, while the remaining six episodes are recompiled cuts of the film with several slight edits performed on them to account for its episodic format. It was broadcast in Japan from October 10 to November 28, 2021, while it was broadcast on Adult Swim's Toonami programming block in the United States from November 12 to December 17, 2023.

== Reception ==
=== Box office ===
The worldwide box office total for Demon Slayer: Kimetsu no Yaiba the Movie: Mugen Train is over $512.7 million from more than 41 million tickets sold, making it the highest-grossing film of 2020 as well as the highest-grossing anime and Japanese film of all time. It was the first time in the history of cinema that a non-Hollywood production topped the annual worldwide box office. It also became the highest-grossing R-rated animated film of all time, surpassing Sausage Party.

Prior to its release in Japan, the film set monthly sales records for advance tickets sold for two consecutive months in September and October 2020. Upon release, it set several box office records including highest opening weekend gross (¥4.6 billion, $44 million) and fastest to gross ¥10 billion (ten days), ¥20 billion (24 days), and ¥30 billion (59 days). It also set the record for the highest-grossing IMAX release in Japan with $25 million, surpassing the $13 million record previously set by Bohemian Rhapsody in 2018. The film became the first film to top the Japanese box office charts for ten consecutive weekends since the charts began publication in 2004, and ultimately remained in the top 10 for 32 weeks, the second-highest number of consecutive weeks in the Japanese charts behind Titanic's 40 weeks in the late 1990s. It became the highest-grossing film of all time in Japan in 73 days at a gross of ¥32.48 billion, surpassing Spirited Away, which had held the record for 19 years. After 220 days of release, it became the first film in the history of Japanese cinema to gross ¥40 billion.

Outside of Japan, its highest gross in a single market was in the United States and Canada, where it was released on April 23, 2021, and grossed US$47.7 million to become the second-highest-grossing anime film of all time in the market, after Pokémon: The First Movie which grossed US$85.7 million. Its North American opening weekend gross of $21.2 million set the record as the biggest opening for any foreign-language film released in North America. Also, its second weekend topped the box office, which was the first anime film since Pokémon: The First Movie. It became the highest-grossing animated film of all time in Taiwan by grossing NT$360 million (US$12.6 million) in 17 days after its release and went on to gross NT$634 million in total. It also became the highest-grossing anime film in several other markets, including Singapore where it was released on November 12, 2020, and went on to gross S$2.42 million ($1.83 million), Malaysia where it was released on March 5, 2021, and went on to gross more than RM4.3 million to surpass One Piece: Stampede's RM3.3 million, Thailand where it surpassed the previous record held by Your Name during the first weekend and went on to gross ฿124 million, and Russia where it grossed $1.7 million. In Hong Kong, the film topped the box office for four consecutive weekends following its opening on November 12, 2020, but its box office run came to a halt as all the cinemas in Hong Kong were shut down on December 2, 2020, amidst the outbreak of the fourth wave of COVID-19 pandemic in Hong Kong; cinemas did not reopen again until February 18, 2021.

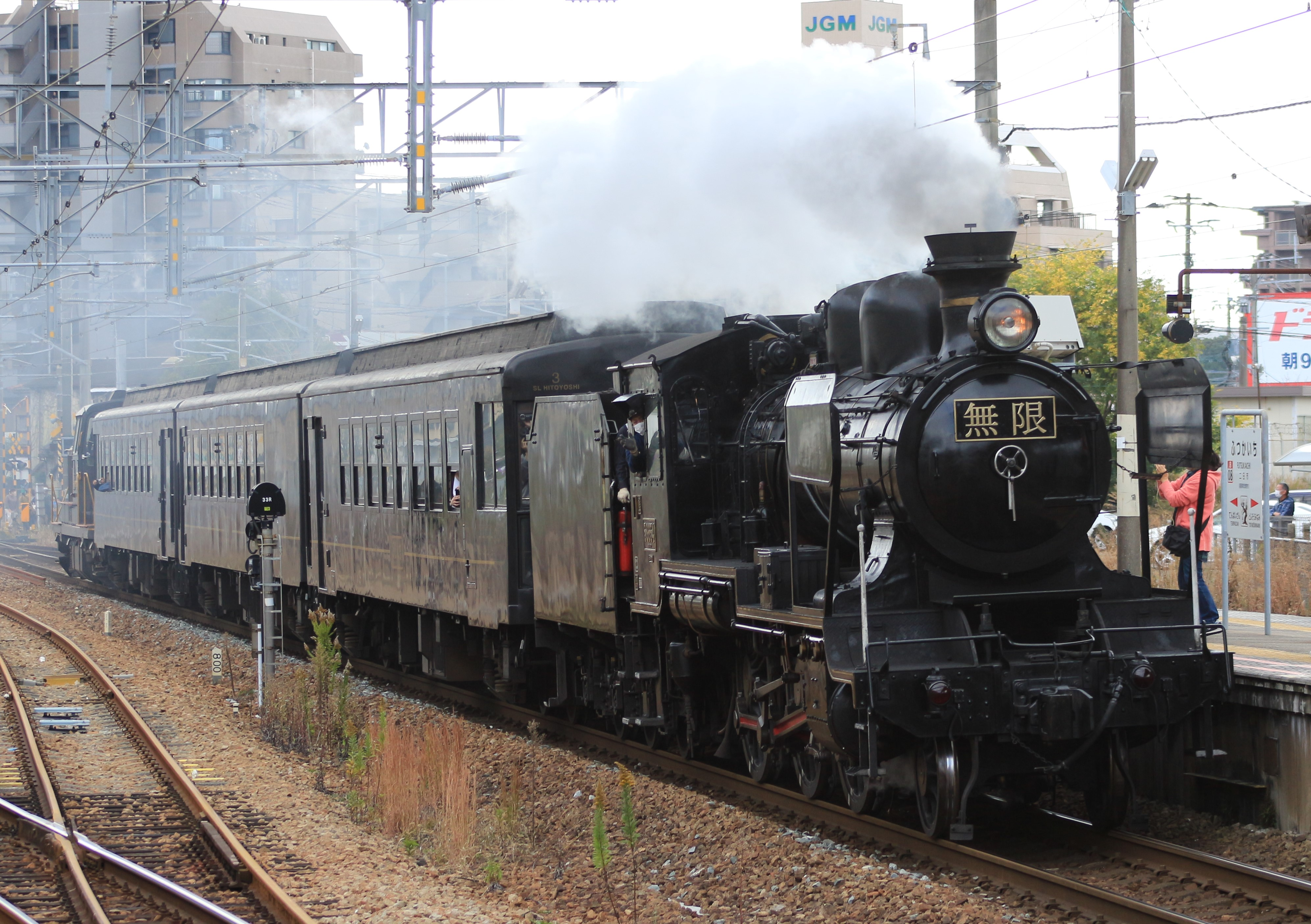
Kyushu Railway Company's collaborative special train "SL Kimetsu no Yaiba"

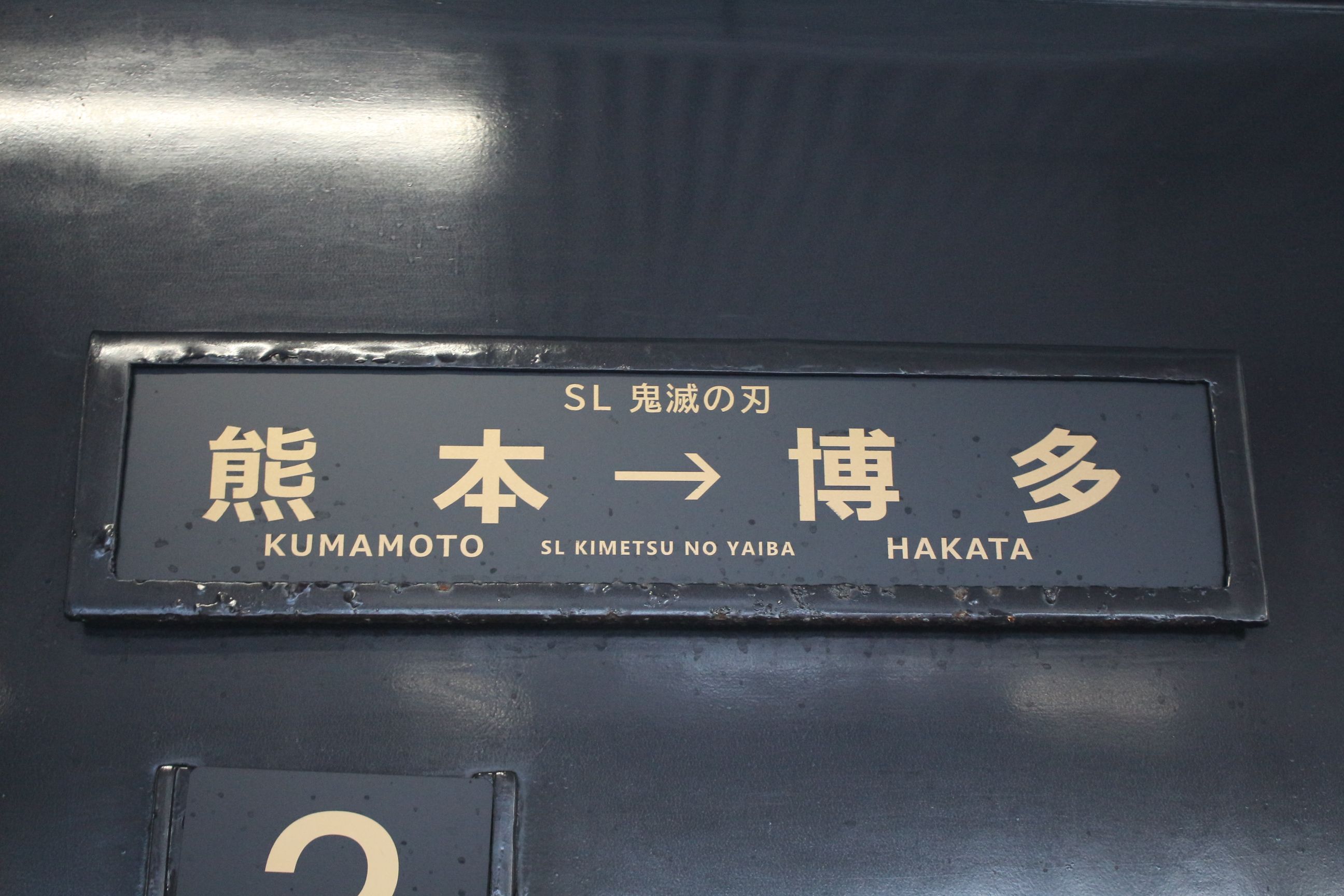
SL Kimetsu no Yaiba Destination Sign

The box-office success of the film was attributed to a confluence of different factors. Among these were being released during a period of relative calm in the COVID-19 pandemic in Japan, which meant that theaters were open but competition from other films was low, and the protracted sequential release of the manga, anime and film which allowed anticipation to build up over time.

=== Critical response ===
On the review aggregator website Rotten Tomatoes, 98% of 49 critics' reviews are positive, with an average rating of 7.8/10. The site's critics consensus reads, "Demon Slayer's visually stunning animation and masterful action set pieces serve a heartfelt plot that is sure to satisfy fans." According to Metacritic, which assigned a weighted average score of 72 out of 100 based on 10 critics, the film received "generally favorable reviews". American audiences surveyed by PostTrak gave it a 92% positive score, with 78% saying they would definitely recommend it. Demon Slayer: Kimetsu no Yaiba the Movie: Mugen Train was one of the Jury Recommended works at the 25th Japan Media Arts Festival in 2022.

Crunchyroll reviewer Daryl Harding gave the film a positive review, praising the combination of 2D and 3D animation techniques, the music, and the character writing. IndieWire reviewer David Ehrlich, who gave the film a "C" on an A to F scale, likewise praised the film for its striking visuals, and for the characters of Kyōjurō Rengoku and Enmu, but said its R rating was excessive. By contrast, Anime News Network reviewer Kim Morrissy and Variety reviewer Peter Debruge compared the animation quality unfavourably to that of the TV series. Harding, Ehrlich, Morrissy and Debruge all noted that fully understanding and appreciating the film requires having watched the first season of the anime beforehand.

=== Accolades ===
List of awards and nominations
Year	Award	Category	Recipient(s)	Result
2020	45th Hochi Film Award	Best Animation Film	Demon Slayer: Kimetsu no Yaiba – The Movie: Mugen Train	Won
2020	33rd Nikkan Sports Film Award for Yūjirō Ishihara Award	Best Animation Film	Demon Slayer: Kimetsu no Yaiba – The Movie: Mugen Train	Won
2020	33rd Nikkan Sports Film Award for Yūjirō Ishihara Award	Best Director	Haruo Sotozaki	Won
2020	33rd Nikkan Sports Film Award for Yūjirō Ishihara Award	Best Anime Film of the Year	Demon Slayer: Kimetsu no Yaiba – The Movie: Mugen Train	Won
2020	26th AMD Award	Grand Prize	Demon Slayer: Kimetsu no Yaiba – The Movie: Mugen Train	Won
2021	44th Japan Academy Film Prize	Animation of the Year	Demon Slayer: Kimetsu no Yaiba – The Movie: Mugen Train	Won
2021	44th Japan Academy Film Prize	Outstanding Achievement in Music	Yuki Kajiura, Go Shiina	Won
2021	44th Japan Academy Film Prize	Topic Award	Demon Slayer: Kimetsu no Yaiba – The Movie: Mugen Train	Won
2021	44th Japan Academy Film Prize	Fan Popularity Award	Demon Slayer: Kimetsu no Yaiba – The Movie: Mugen Train	Won
2021	74th Annual Mainichi Film Awards / Concours	Best Animation Film	Demon Slayer: Kimetsu no Yaiba – The Movie: Mugen Train	Nominated
2021	25th Satellite Awards	Best Motion Picture, Animated or Mixed Media	Demon Slayer: Kimetsu no Yaiba – The Movie: Mugen Train	Nominated
2021	52nd Seiun Awards	Best Media	Demon Slayer: Kimetsu no Yaiba – The Movie: Mugen Train	Nominated
2021	27th Manga Barcelona Awards	Best anime movie release in theaters	Demon Slayer: Kimetsu no Yaiba – The Movie: Mugen Train	Nominated
2021	27th Manga Barcelona Awards	Best anime movie premiere on platforms/TV	Demon Slayer: Kimetsu no Yaiba – The Movie: Mugen Train	Nominated
2021	15th Asian Film Awards	2020 Highest Grossing Asian Film	Demon Slayer: Kimetsu no Yaiba – The Movie: Mugen Train	Won
2021	TAAF (Tokyo Anime Award Festival) Awards	Best Director	Haruo Sotozaki	Won
2021	TAAF (Tokyo Anime Award Festival) Awards	Best Animator	Akira Matsushima	Won
2021	45th Elan d'or Awards	Special Achievement Awards	Demon Slayer: Kimetsu no Yaiba – The Movie: Mugen Train	Won
2021	Newtype Anime Awards	Best Picture Award (Theatrical Work)	Demon Slayer: Kimetsu no Yaiba – The Movie: Mugen Train	Won
2021	Newtype Anime Awards	Character Award (Male Character)	Kyojuro Rengoku	Won
2021	Newtype Anime Awards	Character Award (Female Character)	Nezuko Kamado	Won
2021	Newtype Anime Awards	Theme Song Award	"Homura"	Won
2021	Newtype Anime Awards	Director Award	Haruo Sotozaki	Won
2022	28th Manga Barcelona Awards	Best Anime Film In Physical Format (BR/DVD)	Demon Slayer: Kimetsu no Yaiba – The Movie: Mugen Train (Collector's Edition)	Won
2022	6th Crunchyroll Anime Awards	Best Film	Demon Slayer: Kimetsu no Yaiba – The Movie: Mugen Train	Won
2022	6th Crunchyroll Anime Awards	Best VA Performance (Castilian)	Marcel Navarro as Tanjiro Kamado	Won
2022	6th Crunchyroll Anime Awards	Best VA Performance (Russian)	Islam Gandzhaev as Tanjiro Kamado	Won
2026	Gold House	Gold100 List	Koyoharu Gotouge	Included
