= Demon Slayer: Kimetsu no Yaiba – To the Swordsmith Village =

2023 Japanese animated film by Haruo Sotozaki

- Theatrical release poster
- Kanji: 鬼滅の刃 刀鍛冶の里編
- Revised Hepburn: Kimetsu no Yaiba Katanakaji no Sato-hen
- Directed by: Haruo Sotozaki
- Screenplay by: Ufotable
- Based on: Demon Slayer: Kimetsu no Yaiba by Koyoharu Gotouge
- Produced by: Akifumi Fujio; Masanori Miyake; Yūma Takahashi
- Starring: Natsuki Hanae; Akari Kitō; Yoshitsugu Matsuoka; Hiro Shimono; Katsuyuki Konishi
- Cinematography: Yūichi Terao
- Edited by: Manabu Kamino
- Music by: Yuki Kajiura; Go Shiina
- Production company: Ufotable
- Distributed by: Aniplex; Toho
- Release date: February 3, 2023 (Japan)
- Running time: 110 minutes
- Country: Japan
- Language: Japanese
- Box office: $59.5 million

Demon Slayer: Kimetsu no Yaiba – To the Swordsmith Village (Japanese: 鬼滅の刃 刀鍛冶の里編, Hepburn: Kimetsu no Yaiba Katanakaji no Sato-hen), also known simply as Demon Slayer: To the Swordsmith Village is a 2023 Japanese animated dark fantasy action feature-length compilation of the "Entertainment District" and "Swordsmith Village" arcs from the 2016–20 manga series Demon Slayer: Kimetsu no Yaiba by Koyoharu Gotouge. It is a direct sequel to the second season of the anime television series as well as its first compilation of episodes released in theaters, following Demon Slayer: Kimetsu no Yaiba – The Movie: Mugen Train (2020). The episodes in the compilation were directed by Haruo Sotozaki and written by Ufotable staff members.

Unlike the previous film, which was produced specifically for a theatrical release, To the Swordsmith Village acts as a compilation film to the anime television series, incorporating footage from the last two episodes of the second season and the first episode of the third season, which was yet to broadcast at the time of the film's release.

Demon Slayer: Kimetsu no Yaiba – To the Swordsmith Village was released in Japan on February 3, 2023, by Toho and Aniplex. It received generally positive reviews and grossed over $59 million worldwide. A sequel set after the previous events of the third season, Demon Slayer: Kimetsu no Yaiba – To the Hashira Training, was released on February 2, 2024. A film trilogy set after the events of the fourth season has been confirmed, with the first installment, Part 1: Akaza Returns, premiered on July 18, 2025.

== Plot ==
As Tanjiro Kamado, Zenitsu Agatsuma, and Inosuke Hashibira assist Sound Hashira Tengen Uzui against Upper Rank Six siblings Daki and Gyutaro, they realize only a simultaneous beheading can kill them. (Note: As depicted in the final two episodes of the second season of the anime series.) The trio successfully behead Daki, but Gyutaro wounds Tengen and stabs Inosuke with his poisonous sickle, retrieving her head. Zenitsu pushes Tanjiro away to save him from Daki's obi slashes, after which Gyutaro mocks Tanjiro for his inability to protect his friends and his demonic younger sister, Nezuko.

Gyutaro tries to persuade him to become a demon, but Tanjiro head-butts and stabs him with a wisteria-laced kunai. As he attempts to behead him again, Daki is then attacked by Zenitsu, using the last of his strength to reach her neck. Inosuke joins him, having survived by moving his internal organs upon being stabbed. Gyutaro removes the kunai and nearly kills Tanjiro, but Tengen intervenes and battles him to a standstill. Tanjiro summons his remaining strength, causing a strange mark to appear on his forehead that allows him to slash Gyutaro's neck, while Zenitsu and Inosuke cut through Daki's.

After the demons are beheaded, Tengen warns everyone to flee as Gyutaro's body explodes into waves of blood blades that destroy the city. However, Nezuko uses her Blood Demon Art to burn the blades and save those who were poisoned by burning away Gyutaro's blood. Tanjiro and Nezuko find the dying demons arguing about their defeat and insulting their relationship. He implores them to forgive each other in their last moments, just as Daki disintegrates. Gyutaro remembers their human lives before becoming demons as he disintegrates. In the afterlife, they reconcile upon remembering the promise they made to never be apart, walking to Hell together. Serpent Hashira Obanai Iguro arrives and commends Tengen for killing the Upper Rank Six, but Tengen intends to retire as Hashira and tells him about Tanjiro's potential.

In the Infinity Castle, Muzan Kibutsuji summons the remaining Upper Ranks – Akaza, Gyokko, Hantengu, Doma, and Kokushibo – and informs them of Gyutaro's death. He admonishes them for their failures and lack of purpose, before sending Gyokko and Hantengu on a joint mission to cripple the Demon Slayer Corps.

Two months later, Tanjiro has a dream about someone's encounter with a Demon Slayer from the past that wore the same earrings as him, before waking up from being comatose. While he undergoes rehabilitation, Zenitsu and Inosuke are summoned to individual missions. Because his swordsmith Hotaru Haganezuka has refused to forge him a new sword, Tanjiro must meet him at the Swordsmith Village to discuss the matter in person. He arrives with Nezuko and meets Love Hashira Mitsuri Kanroji. Village chief Tecchin Tecchikawahara reassures Tanjiro he will bring Hotaru back to build his sword.

While relaxing in hot springs, Tanjiro and Nezuko encounter Genya, a Demon Slayer from his Final Selection, who angrily rejects Tanjiro's attempt at friendship and storms off. Later, Mitsuri hints at Tanjiro about a "secret weapon" hidden in the village that can make him stronger before leaving. The next day, while searching for the weapon, Tanjiro meets Mist Hashira Muichiro Tokito and sees that seemingly with him is the same figure from his dream.

== Voice cast ==
Character	Japanese	English
Tanjiro Kamado (竈門 炭治郎, Kamado Tanjirō)	Natsuki Hanae	Zach Aguilar
Nezuko Kamado (竈門 禰豆子, Kamado Nezuko)	Akari Kitō	Abby Trott
Zenitsu Agatsuma (我妻 善逸, Agatsuma Zenitsu)	Hiro Shimono	Aleks Le
Inosuke Hashibira (嘴平 伊之助, Hashibira Inosuke)	Yoshitsugu Matsuoka	Bryce Papenbrook
Tengen Uzui (宇髄 天元, Uzui Tengen)	Katsuyuki Konishi	Ray Chase
Gyutaro / Upper Rank 6 (妓夫太郎, Gyūtarō)	Ryôta Ôsaka	Brandon McInnis
Daki / Upper Rank 6 (堕姫, Daki)	Miyuki Sawashiro	Erica Lindbeck
Hinatsuru (雛鶴, Hinatsuru)	Atsumi Tanezaki	Anairis Quiñones
Makio (まきを, Makio)	Shizuka Ishigami	Erica Mendez
Suma (須磨, Suma)	Nao Tōyama	Emi Lo
Muzan Kibutsuji (鬼舞辻無惨, Kibutsuji Muzan)	Toshihiko Seki	Greg Chun
Kokushibo / Upper Rank 1 (黒死牟, Kokushibō)	Ryôtarô Okiayu	Jonah Scott
Doma / Upper Rank 2 (童磨, Dōma)	Mamoru Miyano	Stephen Fu
Akaza / Upper Rank 3 (猗窩座, Akaza)	Akira Ishida	Lucien Dodge
Hantengu / Upper Rank 4 (半天狗, Hantengu)	Toshio Furukawa	Christopher Corey Smith
Gyokko / Upper Rank 5 (玉壼, Gyokko)	Kôhsuke Toriumi	Brent Mukai
Nakime (鳴女, Nakime)	Marina Inoue	Amber Lee Connors
Mitsuri Kanroji (甘露寺 蜜璃, Kanroji Mitsuri)	Kana Hanazawa	Kira Buckland
Muichiro Tokito (時透 無一郎, Tokitō Muichirō)	Kengo Kawanishi	Griffin Burns
Obanai Iguro (伊黒 小芭内, Iguro Obanai)	Kenichi Suzumura	Erik Scott Kimerer
Kanao Tsuyuri (栗花落 カナヲ, Tsuyuri Kanao)	Reina Ueda	Brianna Knickerbocker
Aoi Kanzaki (神崎 アオイ, Kanzaki Aoi)	Yuri Ehara	Reba Buhr
Sumi Nakahara (中原 すみ, Nakahara Sumi)	Ayumi Mano	Michelle Marie
Kiyo Terauchi (寺内 きよ, Terauchi Kiyo)	Nanami Yamashita	Jackie Lastra
Naho Takada (高田 なほ, Takada Naho)	Yuki Kuwahara	Kimberly Woods
Genya Shinazugawa (不死川 玄弥, Shinazugawa Genya)	Nobuhiko Okamoto	Zeno Robinson
Hotaru Haganezuka (鋼鐵塚 螢, Haganezuka Hotaru)	Daisuke Namikawa	Robbie Daymond
Kagaya Ubuyashiki (産屋敷 耀哉, Ubuyashiki Kagaya)	Toshiyuki Morikawa	Matthew Mercer
Amane Ubuyashiki (産屋敷 天音, Ubuyashiki Amane)	Rina Satō	Suzie Yeung
Tecchin Tecchikawahara (鉄地河原 鉄珍, Tecchikawahara Tecchin)	Yûsaku Yara	Mike McFarland
Kotetsu (小鉄, Kotetsu)	Ayumu Murase	Jeannie Tirado
Goto (後藤, Gotō)	Makoto Furukawa	Derek Stephen Prince
Sumiyoshi (炭吉, Sumiyoshi)	Hirofumi Nojima	Howard Wang
Yoriichi Tsugikuni (継国 縁壱, Tsugikuni Yoriichi)	Kazuhiko Inoue	Mick Lauer

== Release ==
=== Theatrical ===
The film was released theatrically in Japan on February 3, 2023. The film opened in 418 cinemas total within the country. The film had a very staggered international release, being released from as early as March 2, 2023, in Italy, Australia, South Korea, and New Zealand, to as late as March 10, 2023, in Mexico and Norway. In India, Pakistan the film was released on March 17, 2023.

== Reception ==
=== Box office ===
As of April 14, 2023, Demon Slayer: Kimetsu no Yaiba – To the Swordsmith Village has grossed $10.1 million in the United States and Canada, and $46.2 million in other territories, for a worldwide total of $56.3 million.

In the United States and Canada, Demon Slayer: Kimetsu no Yaiba – To the Swordsmith Village was released alongside Creed III and Operation Fortune: Ruse de Guerre, was projected to gross $7.5–10 million from 1,774 theaters in its opening weekend. It ended up debuting to $10.1 million, finishing fourth at the box office.

=== Critical response ===
On the review aggregator website Rotten Tomatoes, 75% of 8 critics' reviews are positive, with an average rating of 6.5/10. Audiences surveyed by CinemaScore gave the film an average grade of "B+" on an A+ to F scale, while those polled by PostTrak gave it a 74% positive score, with 61% saying they would definitely recommend it.

Jasmine Lane of The Austin Chronicle gave the film 2 out of 5 stars, and wrote "While first film Mugen Train was a box-office smash and a rare instance of using the movie format to more succinctly and dynamically tell the next arc of the Demon Slayer story, To the Swordsmith Village is – and I can't stress this enough – just a music videoesque recap of the first couple seasons followed by three episodes sloppily jammed together, with even their intro and outro segments still fully intact."
