= Demon Slayer: Kimetsu no Yaiba – To the Hashira Training =

2024 Japanese animated film by Haruo Sotozaki

- Theatrical release poster
- Kanji: 鬼滅の刃 柱稽古編
- Revised Hepburn: Kimetsu no Yaiba Hashira Geiko-hen
- Directed by: Haruo Sotozaki
- Screenplay by: Ufotable
- Based on: Demon Slayer: Kimetsu no Yaiba by Koyoharu Gotouge
- Produced by: Akifumi Fujio; Masanori Miyake; Yūma Takahashi
- Starring: Natsuki Hanae; Akari Kitō; Kengo Kawanishi; Kana Hanazawa
- Cinematography: Yūichi Terao
- Edited by: Manabu Kamino
- Music by: Yuki Kajiura; Go Shiina
- Production company: Ufotable
- Distributed by: Aniplex; Toho
- Release dates: February 2, 2024 (Japan); February 23, 2024 (United States)
- Running time: 103 minutes
- Country: Japan
- Language: Japanese
- Box office: $50.4 million

Demon Slayer: Kimetsu no Yaiba – To the Hashira Training (Japanese: 鬼滅の刃 柱稽古編, Hepburn: Kimetsu no Yaiba Hashira Geiko-hen), also known simply as Demon Slayer: To the Hashira Training, is a 2024 Japanese animated dark fantasy action feature-length compilation of "Swordsmith Village" and "Hashira Training" arcs from the 2016–20 manga series Demon Slayer: Kimetsu no Yaiba by Koyoharu Gotouge. It is a direct sequel to the third season of the anime television series as well as its second feature-length compilation of episodes released in movie theaters, following Demon Slayer: Kimetsu no Yaiba – To the Swordsmith Village (2023). The episodes in the compilation are directed by Haruo Sotozaki and written by Ufotable staff members.

Similarly to the Swordsmith Village compilation, To the Hashira Training acts as a compilation film to the anime television series, incorporating fully the last episode of the third season and the first episode of the fourth season, which was broadcast later in the same year, as well as an edited summary using footage of previous episodes at the beginning.

Demon Slayer: Kimetsu no Yaiba – To the Hashira Training was released in Japan on February 2, 2024, by Aniplex and Toho in Japan and Crunchyroll and Sony Pictures Releasing worldwide. Like its predecessors, the film received generally positive reviews and grossed over $50 million worldwide. A film trilogy set after the events of the fourth season has been confirmed, with the first installment, Part 1: Akaza Returns, premiered on July 18, 2025.

== Plot ==
In the Demon Slayer Corps' Swordsmith Village, Tanjiro Kamado, his demon sister Nezuko, and Demon Slayer Genya Shinazugawa assist Love Hashira Mitsuri Kanroji against Upper Rank Four Hantengu, who has hidden himself while his manifested hatred Zohakuten attacks them. (Note: As depicted in the final episode of the third season of the anime series.) In the midst of battle, Mitsuri awakens a mysterious mark that greatly enhances her strength and speed, forcing him to focus on her and allowing the three to pursue Hantengu. Tanjiro uses his Hinokami Kagura to slash his neck, but Hantengu summons his manifested resentment Urami.

Urami attacks Genya and Tanjiro until Nezuko burns him with her Blood Demon Art. They fall down a cliff when Mist Hashira Muichiro Tokito and swordsmiths Kozo Kanamori, Kotetsu, and Hotaru Haganezuka arrive to support them. With his last strength, Muichiro gives Tanjiro Hotaru's unfinished sword. He beheads Urami but Nezuko begins to burn as dawn breaks. Panicking, Tanjiro then sees that Urami's beheaded body is still moving because Hantengu is alive.

Tanjiro freezes in his indecision until Nezuko signals him to kill the demon. He finds Hantengu hiding in Urami's heart and exposes him to sunlight after slicing Urami in half. Hantengu remembers his human past as Tanjiro kills him, saving Mitsuri as well when Zohakuten disintegrates. Tanjiro mourns Nezuko's death but she is revealed to be alive, no longer burning, and has regained the ability to speak slightly.

Through Hantengu's memories, Muzan Kibutsuji learns of Nezuko's new immunity, realizing his goal to be immortal will be fulfilled if he devours her. In the aftermath of the battle, Muichiro thanks Tanjiro for helping him to regain his identity, Mitsuri embraces them for all for surviving, and the village celebrate the siblings for their victory.

In another mission, Serpent Hashira Obanai Iguro and Wind Hashira Sanemi Shinazugawa investigate an abandoned temple inhabited by demons. They discover it is one of several portals to the Infinity Castle, a vast extra-dimensional space that serves as Muzan's lair. While his friends Zenitsu and Inosuke return from their missions, Tanjiro recovers from his wounds; Hotaru gives him a new sword with the late Flame Hashira Kyojuro Rengoku's tsuba on it.

The Corps' leader Kagaya Ubuyashiki has become bedridden, and his wife Amane summons the Hashira to a meeting in his stead. Muichiro and Mitsuri inform them about the awakening of their marks, both of which happened under extreme duress. To ensure the others can attain theirs as well, they must undergo a special training regimen and submit the Corps to it, in order to prepare everyone for Muzan's arrival for Nezuko. However, Water Hashira Giyu Tomioka refuses to participate and leaves. Elsewhere, the demon Tamayo is visited by a Kasugai crow on Kagaya's behalf, asking her to join forces with the Corps.

== Voice cast ==
| Character | Japanese | English |
|---|---|---|
| Tanjiro Kamado (竈門 炭治郎, Kamado Tanjirō) | Natsuki Hanae | Zach Aguilar |
| Nezuko Kamado (竈門 禰豆子, Kamado Nezuko) | Akari Kitō | Abby Trott |
| Muichiro Tokito (時透 無一郎, Tokitō Muichirō) | Kengo Kawanishi | Griffin Burns |
| Mitsuri Kanroji (甘露寺 蜜璃, Kanroji Mitsuri) | Kana Hanazawa | Kira Buckland |
| Hantengu / Upper Rank 4 (半天狗, Hantengu) | Toshio Furukawa (Hantengu and Urami); Koichi Yamadera (Zohakuten) | Christopher Corey Smith (Hantengu and Urami); Ben Balmaceda (Zohakuten) |
| Gyokko / Upper Rank 5 (玉壼, Gyokko) | Kohsuke Toriumi | Brent Mukai |
| Genya Shinazugawa (不死川 玄弥, Shinazugawa Genya) | Nobuhiko Okamoto | Zeno Robinson |
| Hotaru Haganezuka (鋼鐵塚 螢, Haganezuka Hotaru) | Daisuke Namikawa | Robbie Daymond |
| Kozo Kanamori (鉄穴森 鋼蔵, Kanamori Kōzō) | Eiji Takemoto | Kyle Hebert |
| Kotetsu (小鉄, Kotetsu) | Ayumu Murase | Jeannie Tirado |
| Zenitsu Agatsuma (我妻 善逸, Agatsuma Zenitsu) | Hiro Shimono | Aleks Le |
| Inosuke Hashibira (嘴平 伊之助, Hashibira Inosuke) | Yoshitsugu Matsuoka | Bryce Papenbrook |
| Kanao Tsuyuri (栗花落 カナヲ, Tsuyuri Kanao) | Reina Ueda | Brianna Knickerbocker |
| Kagaya Ubuyashiki (産屋敷 耀哉, Ubuyashiki Kagaya) | Toshiyuki Morikawa | Matthew Mercer |
| Amane Ubuyashiki (産屋敷 天音, Ubuyashiki Amane) | Rina Satō | Suzie Yeung |
| Muzan Kibutsuji (鬼舞辻無惨, Kibutsuji Muzan) | Toshihiko Seki | Greg Chun |
| Obanai Iguro (伊黒 小芭内, Iguro Obanai) | Kenichi Suzumura | Erik Scott Kimerer |
| Giyu Tomioka (富岡 義勇, Tomioka Giyū) | Takahiro Sakurai | Johnny Yong Bosch |
| Gyomei Himejima (悲鳴嶼 行冥, Himejima Gyōmei) | Tomokazu Sugita | Crispin Freeman |
| Shinobu Kocho (胡蝶 しのぶ, Kochō Shinobu) | Saori Hayami | Erika Harlacher |
| Sanemi Shinazugawa (不死川 実弥, Shinazugawa Sanemi) | Tomokazu Seki | Kaiji Tang |
| Tengen Uzui (宇髄 天元, Uzui Tengen) | Katsuyuki Konishi | Ray Chase |
| Hinatsuru (雛鶴, Hinatsuru) | Atsumi Tanezaki | Anairis Quiñones |
| Makio (まきを, Makio) | Shizuka Ishigami | Erica Mendez |
| Suma (須磨, Suma) | Nao Tōyama | Emi Lo |
| Aoi Kanzaki (神崎 アオイ, Kanzaki Aoi) | Yuri Ehada | Reba Buhr |
| Tamayo (珠世, Tamayo) | Maaya Sakamoto | Laura Post |
| Yushiro (愈史郎, Yushirō) | Daiki Yamashita | Kyle McCarley |
| Sumi Nakahara (中原 すみ, Nakahara Sumi) | Ayumi Mano | Michelle Marie |
| Kiyo Terauchi (寺内 きよ, Terauchi Kiyo) | Nanami Yamashita | Jackie Lastra |
| Naho Takada (高田 なほ, Takada Naho) | Yuki Kuwahara | Kimberly Woods |
| Goto (後藤, Gotō) | Makoto Furukawa | Derek Stephen Prince |
| Tecchin Tecchikawahara (鉄地河原 鉄珍, Tecchikawahara Tecchin) | Yûsaku Yara | Mike McFarland |

== Release ==
=== Theatrical ===
The film was theatrically released in Japan on February 2, 2024. It was also theatrically released on February 22, 2024, in Brazil and various European countries. In the United States, Canada and India, it was theatrically released on February 23, 2024, via Crunchyroll and Sony Pictures Releasing.

=== World Tour dates ===
| Date | Location | Special guests |
|---|---|---|
| February 2, 2024 | Tokyo | Natsuki Hanae, Akari Kito, Hiro Shimono, Yoshisugu Matsuoka, Nobuhiko Okamoto, Yuma Takahashi |
| February 3, 2024 | Tokyo | Takahiro Sakurai, Katsuyuki Konishi, Kengo Kawanishi, Saori Hayami, Kana Hanazawa, Kenichi Suzumura, Tomokazu Seki, Tomokazu Sugita, Yuma Takahashi |
| February 10, 2024 | New York | Natsuki Hanae, Hiro Shimono, Yuma Takahashi |
| February 11, 2024 | Seoul | Kengo Kawanishi, Kana Hanazawa |
| February 17, 2024 | Mexico City | Takahiro Sakurai, Kengo Kawanishi, Yuma Takahashi |
| February 17, 2024 | Singapore | Natsuki Hanae, Akari Kito |
| February 18, 2024 | Jakarta | Natsuki Hanae, Akari Kito |
| February 22, 2024 | Hungary | Natsuki Hanae, Yuma Takahashi |
| February 24, 2024 | Paris | Natsuki Hanae, Yuma Takahashi |
| February 24, 2024 | Taipei | Yoshitsugu Matsuoka, Saori Hayami |
| February 25, 2024 | London | Natsuki Hanae, Yuma Takahashi |
| February 25, 2024 | Hong Kong | Yoshitsugu Matsuoka, Saori Hayami |

== Reception ==
=== Box office ===
As of September 12, 2024, Demon Slayer: Kimetsu no Yaiba – To the Hashira Training has grossed $17.6 million in the United States and Canada, and $32.7 million in other territories, for a worldwide total of $50.4 million.

In the United States and Canada, Demon Slayer: Kimetsu no Yaiba – To the Hashira Training was released alongside Drive-Away Dolls and Ordinary Angels, and was projected to gross $7–8 million from 1,949 theaters in its opening weekend. It ended up over-performing and debuting to $11.6 million, finishing in second behind Bob Marley: One Love.

=== Critical response ===
On the review aggregator website Rotten Tomatoes, 88% of 16 critics' reviews are positive, with an average rating of 7.2/10. American audiences surveyed by CinemaScore gave the film an average grade of "B+" on an A+ to F scale, while those polled at PostTrak gave it an 84% positive score, with 68% saying they would definitely recommend the film.

Writing for Fiction Horizon, Arthur S. Poe gave the film an 8/10 score, concluding that "Demon Slayer: Kimetsu no Yaiba – To the Hashira Training is a great work as far as a recap/preview movie is concerned. The editing part was amazing, the selection of music brought back some memories, and all in all, it is a satisfying work that definitely has us wanting more Demon Slayer content."
