= Demon Slayer: Kimetsu no Yaiba season 4 =

Fourth season of Demon Slayer: Kimetsu no Yaiba

Demon Slayer: Kimetsu no Yaiba
- Season 4
- Cover art for the first home media volume of Hashira Training Arc, featuring Serpent Hashira Obanai Iguro (top) and Wind Hashira Sanemi Shinazugawa (bottom)
- No. of episodes: 8

Release
- Original network: Fuji Television
- Original release: May 12 – June 30, 2024

Season chronology
- ← Previous; Season 3

The fourth season of the Demon Slayer: Kimetsu no Yaiba anime television series is based on the manga series Demon Slayer: Kimetsu no Yaiba by Koyoharu Gotouge. At the end of the third season finale, a fourth season covering the manga's "Hashira Training" arc was announced. The fourth season, titled Demon Slayer: Kimetsu no Yaiba – Hashira Training Arc, (Note: Hashira Geiko-hen (柱稽古編)) adapts from the 15th and 16th volumes (chapters 128–139) of the manga. It premiered on May 12, 2024, with a one-hour episode. The season ended with a one-hour special, which aired on June 30 of the same year.

The season follows Tanjiro and his allies as they enter "Hashira Training"; an organized regimen led by the Hashira to prepare them for the coming conflict against Muzan Kibutsuji, who continues to search for Nezuko and Kagaya Ubuyashiki.

A compilation film titled Demon Slayer: Kimetsu no Yaiba – To the Hashira Training, which includes footage from the final Swordsmith Village Arc episode and an advanced screening of the first Hashira Training Arc episode, premiered in Japanese theaters on February 2, 2024. Aniplex of America licensed the season outside of Asia and streamed it on Crunchyroll, which began streaming an English dub on June 30, 2024.

The opening theme song is "Mugen" (夢幻; lit. 'Dream'), while the ending theme song is "Tokoshie" (トコシエ; lit. 'Eternity'), both performed by My First Story and Hyde.

== Episodes ==
| Story | Episode | Title | Directed by | Storyboarded by | Original release date | Viewership rating |
|---|---|---|---|---|---|---|
| 56 | 1 | "To Defeat Muzan Kibutsuji"; Transliteration: "Kibutsuji Muzan o Taosu Tame ni" (Japanese: 鬼舞辻󠄀無惨を倒すために) | Shin'ya Shimomura & Takashi Suhara | Shin'ya Shimomura & Takashi Suhara | May 12, 2024 (Note: Episode 56 is a 48 minute special) | 6.9% |
While on a mission to rescue a kidnapped woman from a demon, Wind Hashira Sanemi Shinazugawa and Serpent Hashira Obanai Iguro encounter an entrance to the Infinity Castle before it vanishes. In an emergency meeting led by Kagaya's wife Amane, the Hashira discuss the marks that appeared on Mitsuri and Muichiro in their battles, said to have originated from the Demon Slayers during the Sengoku period. Muichiro gives details of the physical conditions he felt that may allow the mark to appear on the others. Knowing that Muzan Kibutsuji will attempt to take Nezuko, the Corps enacts Hashira Training for its personnel to condition them for the coming conflict. Each Hashira will lead a training regimen to strengthen the Demon Slayers. However, Water Hashira Giyu Tomioka refuses to participate. Whilst in hiding, Tamayo is visited by Kagaya's Kasugai crow, who instructs her to ally with the Corps and work with Shinobu Kocho.
| 57 | 2 | "Water Hashira Giyu Tomioka's Pain"; Transliteration: "Mizu Bashira・Tomioka Giyū no Itami" (Japanese: 水柱・冨岡義勇の痛み) | Yūji Shimizu | Yūji Shimizu | May 19, 2024 | 6.1% |
Tamayo informs Yushiro of her decision to ally with the Corps. Tanjiro learns of Giyu's refusal to join Hashira Training, with Kagaya asking that he speak to him. Despite being repeatedly dismissed, Tanjiro persists. Eventually, Giyu explains his refusal to accept he is a Hashira; as a child, he trained with and befriended a similarly-aged boy, Sabito. During Final Selection, despite Sabito defeating nearly every demon present, he was the only one killed, leaving Giyu, who was unable to kill any demons after being incapacitated, riddled with guilt and self-loathing. In Tanjiro's attempt to encourage him, Giyu remembers Sabito's words, teaching him to value his life as a gift from his sister, who died protecting him from a demon. Realizing his attempts to forget them was to avoid his own grief, he decides to participate. Shinobu, believing the time is right, decides to tell Kanao her plan regarding the demon who killed their older sister.
| 58 | 3 | "Fully Recovered Tanjiro Joins the Hashira Training!!"; Transliteration: "Tanjirō Zenkai‼ Bashira Keiko Dai Sanka" (Japanese: 炭治郎全快‼ 柱稽古大参加) | Takashi Mamekuza | Yō Miura | May 26, 2024 | 6.3% |
After recovering, Tanjiro enters Hashira Training. Reunited with Tengen Uzui and his wives, he tackles the first stage, fitness and stamina, and proves to be the most capable of everyone present. At night, as two Demon Slayers are on patrol, they are unknowingly stalked by a marked eyeball. Obanai and Sanemi discuss their encounter in the castle and the lessened demonic activity, believing it is the calm before the storm; Sanemi then challenges Obanai to a fight, which he accepts. For a special exercise, Tengen plays the role of a demon hunting the trainees, who must work to defeat him. Despite his superior strength and speed, Tanjiro fights back and rallies the trainees to surround him. With his training complete and his peers inspired to work harder, Tengen allows Tanjiro to proceed to Muichiro's stage.
| 59 | 4 | "To Bring a Smile to One's Face"; Transliteration: "Egao ni Nareru" (Japanese: 笑顔になれる) | Seiji Harada | Haruo Sotozaki | June 2, 2024 | 6.7% |
In Muichiro's rapid movement stage, Tanjiro witnesses his strict attitude as he instructs and spars with the trainees, emphasizing perseverance even when injured. Muichiro, while acknowledging his harshness, intends for them to learn that even one mistake could be fatal in battle. Later, he spars with Sanemi and Obanai, who have taken up nightly combat training to improve their skills. Muichiro is impressed with Tanjiro's quick learning and ability to spar with him, allowing him to proceed to the next stage. Before doing so, Tanjiro challenges him to a paper plane contest, under the condition that he treats the trainees better if he wins. Though Tanjiro loses, Muichiro decides to change his attitude upon seeing the trainees' joy when flying their own planes.
| 60 | 5 | "I Even Ate Demons"; Transliteration: "Oni o Kutte Made" (Japanese: 鬼を喰ってまで) | Hideki Hosokawa | Hideki Hosokawa & Haruo Sotozaki | June 9, 2024 | 5.8% |
At Mitsuri's flexibility stage, Tanjiro and the trainees dance to music and stretch themselves to become more limber, with Mitsuri forcing Tanjiro into a split. At Obanai's swordsmanship stage, Tanjiro must swing a bokken between bound trainees as he spars with the Hashira. Despite the initial difficulty, as well as Obanai's dislike of Tanjiro for his closeness to Mitsuri, Tanjiro succeeds and moves to Sanemi's endurance stage, joining Zenitsu. Sanemi ruthlessly pummels him as he spars with the trainees to build their resilience. Later, Genya attempts to gain his brother's acknowledgement, revealing that he eats demons in doing so. Sanemi lashes out at him, leading to a confrontation between him and Tanjiro that ends in Sanemi's training being suspended. As such, Tanjiro and Zenitsu proceed to the last stage, training with Stone Hashira Gyomei Himejima.
| 61 | 6 | "The Strongest of the Demon Slayer Corps"; Transliteration: "Kisatsutai Saikyō" (Japanese: 鬼殺隊最強) | Ken Nakazawa | Ken Nakazawa | June 16, 2024 | 6.4% |
At Gyomei's stage, strengthening the lower body, trainees must stand beneath a waterfall, lift three heavy logs, and push a boulder one chō to finish. Tanjiro and Zenitsu join Inosuke and fellow friend Murata. Despite completing the first two tasks, Tanjiro struggles to move the boulder. Due to the stage's difficulty, trainees choose to leave and place their hopes in Tanjiro instead. Genya reveals that moving the boulder requires Repetitive Action; a technique that involves focusing on certain memories to heighten concentration and increase strength. Tanjiro focuses on his family's memory and Kyojuro's message, manifesting his mark and allowing him to move the boulder. Elsewhere, the Biwa Demon Nakime has been locating the Demon Slayers' locations on Muzan's orders, who desires to find Nezuko and Kagaya.
| 62 | 7 | "Stone Hashira Gyomei Himejima"; Transliteration: "Iwa Bashira・Himejima Gyōmei" (Japanese: 岩柱・悲鳴嶼行冥) | Akihiko Uda | Takashi Suhara | June 23, 2024 (Note: Episode 62 is a 31 minute special) | 5.5% |
After Tanjiro finishes training, Gyomei commends him and claims he has no doubts. Unsure of what he means, he hears Gyomei explain his past. He was a monk who cared for orphans, until a boy left his temple at night and encountered a demon, convincing it to spare him for Gyomei and the others. The demon killed the children, save for one girl, and Gyomei fought it to save her. The girl's remarks afterwards were misinterpreted and he was imprisoned, leaving him cynical and distrustful. Seeing Tanjiro now has convinced Gyomei of his honest character. On his way to Giyu, Tanjiro finds Zenitsu has become stern and serious after reading a letter he received. He watches a spar between Giyu and Sanemi, but Sanemi leaves when Tanjiro attempts to make peace. Later, Sanemi discovers Nakime's eye and realizes the Corps has been infiltrated, as Muzan enters the Ubuyashiki mansion to confront Kagaya.
| 63 | 8 | "The Hashira Unite"; Transliteration: "Bashira・Kesshū" (Japanese: 柱・結集) | Yūji Shimizu, Seiji Harada & Haruo Sotozaki | Takashi Suhara & Yō Miura | June 30, 2024 (Note: Episode 63 is a 40 minute special) | 6.4% |
Kagaya reveals Muzan's role in his illness; he was a member of the Ubuyashiki bloodline and the family was cursed as a result of his crimes as a demon. Muzan disregards this and remains confident he will find Nezuko, but Kagaya assures the demon of his failure, unable to see his desire to become eternal pales in comparison to humanity's anger and will to survive. As the Hashira are summoned to the mansion, explosives level the area, killing Kagaya and most of his family and incapacitating Muzan, who is appalled by his underestimation of Kagaya's ruthlessness. Tamayo appears and injects a human-conversion drug into him before Gyomei decapitates the demon with his flail, which fails to kill him. Muzan battles Gyomei as the Hashira and Tanjiro arrive, but as they attempt to corner him, Nakime opens doors into the Infinity Castle beneath them. Across the mountain, all active Demon Slayers — including Genya, Inosuke, Murata, Kanao, and Zenitsu — are also taken and trapped inside the castle. As he falls deeper into the castle, Tanjiro fiercely declares that he will destroy Muzan.

== Home media release ==
=== Japanese ===
Aniplex (Japan – Region 2/A)
| Vol. | Episodes | Cover art | Bonus disc | Release date | Ref. |
|---|---|---|---|---|---|
| 1 | 1 | Obanai Iguro and Sanemi Shinazugawa | Soundtrack | July 3, 2024 | |
| 2 | 2–3 | Shinobu Kochō, Giyū Tomioka and Tengen Uzui | Soundtrack | August 7, 2024 | |
| 3 | 4–6 | Muichiro Tokito, Mitsuri Kanroji and Gyomei Himejima | Soundtrack | September 4, 2024 | |
| 4 | 7–8 | Kagaya Ubuyashiki and Muzan Kibutsuji | Soundtrack | October 2, 2024 | |

=== English ===
Crunchyroll, LLC (North America – Region 1/A)
| Vol. | Episodes | Standard edition release date | Limited edition release date | Ref. |
|---|---|---|---|---|
| 1 | 1–8 | December 9, 2025 | April 22, 2025 | |
