= Demon Slayer: Kimetsu no Yaiba season 3 =

Third season of Demon Slayer: Kimetsu no Yaiba

Demon Slayer: Kimetsu no Yaiba
- Season 3
- Cover art for the first home media volume of Swordsmith Village Arc, featuring Love Hashira Mitsuri Kanroji
- No. of episodes: 11

Release
- Original network: Fuji Television
- Original release: April 9 – June 18, 2023

Season chronology
- ← Previous; Season 2 Next → Season 4

The third season of the Demon Slayer: Kimetsu no Yaiba anime television series is based on the manga series Demon Slayer: Kimetsu no Yaiba by Koyoharu Gotouge. At the end of the second-season finale, a third season covering the manga's "Swordsmith Village" arc was announced. The third season, titled Demon Slayer: Kimetsu no Yaiba – Swordsmith Village Arc, (Note: Katanakaji no Sato-hen (刀(かたな)鍛(か)冶(じ)の里(さと)編(へん))) adapts from the 12th volume to the 15th volume (chapters 98–127) of the manga and aired from April 9 to June 18, 2023. The season was directed by Haruo Sotozaki, with character designs by Akira Matsushima who also serves as a chief animation director, and animation produced by Ufotable; the main cast from the second season also returned.

The season follows Tanjiro and Nezuko as they travel to the Swordsmith Village and join two members of the Demon Slayer Corps' Hashira — Mist Hashira Muichiro Tokito and Love Hashira Mitsuri Kanroji. Along with fellow Demon Slayer Genya Shinazugawa, they strive to fight and protect the village from two attacking Upper Rank demons.

The opening theme song is "Kizuna no Kiseki" (絆ノ奇跡; lit. 'Miracle of Bonds'), while the ending theme song is "Koi Kogare" (コイコガレ; lit. 'Yearning'), both performed by Man with a Mission and Milet. "Kamado Nezuko no Uta" (竈門襧豆子のうた; "Nezuko Kamado's Song") by Go Shiina featuring Nami Nakagawa is featured as an insert song in the season finale episode.

On February 3, 2023, a compilation film titled Demon Slayer: Kimetsu no Yaiba – To the Swordsmith Village, which includes footage from the final two episodes of Entertainment District Arc and an advanced screening of the first Swordsmith Village Arc episode, premiered in Japan. Aniplex of America licensed the season outside of Asia and streamed it on Crunchyroll, which began streaming an English dub on May 28, 2023.

In July 2024 at San Diego Comic-Con, it was announced that the English dub of Swordsmith Village Arc would broadcast on Adult Swim's Toonami programming block which aired from August 11 to October 20, 2024.

== Episodes ==
Story	Episode	Title	Directed by	Storyboarded by	Original release date	English air date	Viewership rating
45	1	"Someone's Dream"; Transliteration: "Dareka no Yume" (Japanese: 誰かの夢)	Shin'ya Shimomura & Takashi Suhara	Takashi Suhara & Yūichi Terao	April 9, 2023 (Note: Episode 45 is a 49 minute special)	August 11, 2024	8.0%
After their battle in the Entertainment District, Tanjiro, Zenitsu, Inosuke, and Nezuko are found by the Kakushi. In the Infinity Castle, Muzan Kibutsuji summons the remaining Upper Ranks. He admonishes them for their failure to kill the Ubuyashiki family or find the Blue Spider Lily. When Upper Five Gyokko provides new information, he is sent on a joint mission with Upper Four Hantengu. While Zenitsu and Inosuke are sent to individual missions, Tanjiro continues rehabilitating. When swordsmith Hotaru Haganezuka refuses to forge him a new sword, due to Tanjiro always damaging his blades, Tanjiro journeys with Nezuko to the Swordsmith Village to discuss the matter. He meets village chief Tecchin Tecchikawahara, who reassures him about Hotaru. Tanjiro is shown to the village's hot springs where he meets Love Hashira Mitsuri Kanroji and Genya, Sanemi Shinazugawa's younger brother and fellow Final Selection survivor. Mitsuri later hints at Tanjiro about a "secret weapon" that can make him stronger. The next day, Tanjiro finds Mist Hashira Muichiro Tokito arguing with someone and seemingly with them is a man from his dreams.
46	2	"Yoriichi Type Zero"; Transliteration: "Yoriichi Zeroshiki" (Japanese: 縁壱零式)	Akihiko Uda	Kei Tsunematsu	April 16, 2023	August 18, 2024	7.6%
Tanjiro tries to defend the boy from Muichiro but is knocked unconscious for interfering. The boy, Kotetsu, explains that the "man" he saw is actually a mechanical training doll, built during the Sengoku period. Made by his ancestors, it is his only heirloom. Tanjiro agrees to protect it but they find Muichiro's training has caused severe damage. After Kotetsu discovers it remains functional, he orders Tanjiro to train with it and surpass the arrogant Muichiro. However, training proves harsh as Kotetsu denies Tanjiro food and water when he fails to improve. When he faints from exhaustion, Tanjiro imagines himself in the afterlife and sees a peculiar stone in the Sanzu River, enabling him to detect attacks pre-emptively. He lands a powerful blow on the doll's head, which reveals a concealed sword.
47	3	"A Sword from Over 300 Years Ago"; Transliteration: "Sanbyaku-nen Ijō Mae no Katana" (Japanese: 300年以上前の刀)	Ken Nakazawa	Hideki Hosokawa	April 23, 2023	August 25, 2024	6.4%
To Tanjiro's and Kotetsu's disappointment, the sword has rusted over the centuries. Hotaru, who had undergone solitary training, arrives to restore it. Tanjiro later attempts to befriend Genya but is rebuffed. Gyokko and Hantengu infiltrate the village. Hantengu faces Tanjiro, Nezuko, and Muichiro, who beheads him. Two new demons grow from his body; one of them, Karaku, blasts Muichiro away with his uchiwa, and the other, Sekido, shocks the siblings with his khakkhara. Genya arrives and beheads them with a sawed-off shotgun and a Nichirin wakizashi. However, the demons split again; the winged Urogi carries Tanjiro away and hits him with a sonic shriek, while Nezuko tries to defend Genya from the yari-wielding Aizetsu. In the forest, Muichiro finds Kotetsu being attacked by a fish-like demon. Initially choosing to leave him, he saves Kotetsu after remembering Tanjiro's advice about helping others.
48	4	"Thank You, Tokito"; Transliteration: "Tokitō-kun Arigatō" (Japanese: 時透君ありがとう)	Hideki Hosokawa	Hideki Hosokawa	April 30, 2023	September 1, 2024	7.0%
Kotetsu begs Muichiro to save Hotaru and his smith Kozo Kanamori. Muichiro initially elects to protect the village but remembers Master Kagaya's advice about triggering his memories to return, prompting him to rescue the swordsmiths. Tanjiro realizes each demons represents an emotion: joy (Urogi), anger (Sekido), pleasure (Karaku), and sorrow (Aizetsu). Genya confuses Sekido and Aizetsu with his resistance to fatal wounds. Nezuko burns Karaku and blasts him away with his uchiwa but is restrained by Sekido. Tanjiro uses Urogi to reach Nezuko and avoids Sekido's attacks. He frees her but both are incapacitated when Karaku pins them with a blast of wind. Meanwhile, Mitsuri makes her way to the Swordsmith Village.
49	5	"Bright Red Sword"; Transliteration: "Kakutō" (Japanese: 赫刀)	Takuya Nonaka	Takuya Nonaka	May 7, 2023	September 8, 2024	7.2%
After saving Kanamori, Muichiro is taken to his shed for a new blade, where they encounter Gyokko. With her whip-like sword and Love Breathing, Mitsuri saves the village from Gyokko's fish demons. After Karaku pins Nezuko beneath heavy debris, she grips her hands onto Tanjiro's blade, coating it in her blood. Muichiro attacks Gyokko and discovers he can produce new vases and teleport between them to avoid getting hit. He is poisoned by Gyokko's attacks and trapped in a watery vase. Using the fire from her blood, Nezuko heats up Tanjiro's blade into a bright red hue. Sekido realizes the blade resembles that of the swordsman who almost killed Muzan. As his scar becomes a fiery mark once more, Tanjiro unleashes his Hinokami Kagura and swiftly beheads Urogi, Karaku, and Sekido. He notices Aizetsu has been beheaded by Genya but is shocked to see he has assumed the appearance of a demon.
50	6	"Aren't You Going to Become a Hashira?"; Transliteration: "Hashira ni Narun ja Nai no ka!" (Japanese: 柱になるんじゃないのか！)	Seiji Harada	Kei Tsunematsu	May 14, 2023	September 15, 2024	7.6%
When the four emotions do not disintegrate, Tanjiro informs Genya of a hidden fifth demon. Genya expresses jealousy towards him and declares he too shall defeat an Upper Rank, to which Tanjiro responds with encouragement. He and Nezuko fight off the demons while Genya finds the now minuscule Hantengu, but he fails to behead him before Sekido attacks. Believing he will die, Genya recalls his past; he and his family were frequently abused by his father, who was later killed. One night, a demon entered their house, killing all five of Genya's younger siblings before it was fought off by Sanemi. He later found him standing in front of their mother's body, who was the demon, and branded him a murderer in his grief. Genya laments dying without apologizing to Sanemi when Tanjiro saves him from Sekido. After Genya saves him from Aizetsu, Tanjiro goes after Hantengu.
51	7	"Awful Villain"; Transliteration: "Gokuakunin" (Japanese: 極悪人)	Hideki Hosokawa	Yō Miura	May 21, 2023	September 22, 2024	7.0%
Tanjiro attacks Hantengu but is confronted by his manifested hatred Zohakuten, whose Blood Demon Art is summoning giant wooden dragons. Zohakuten, who in actuality is the four demons in one body, hides Hantengu inside a hardened wooden burl. Gyokko enters Kanamori's shed to find Hotaru polishing Tanjiro's blade; he attacks him out of spite but grows annoyed when Hotaru ignores him. Near death, Muichiro sees a vision of Tanjiro, who assures him that someone will come; Kotetsu appears and fruitlessly stabs the watery pot until he is attacked by a small demon. Muichiro dissuades him from trying to help when Kotetsu blows bubbles into the pot, giving him sufficient air to break free. He realizes the reason Tanjiro seems familiar to him is because he shares the same eye color as his father.
52	8	"The Mu in Muichiro"; Transliteration: "Muichirō no Mu" (Japanese: 無一郎の無)	Jun'ichi Minamino	Toshiyuki Shirai	May 28, 2023	September 29, 2024	7.0%
As Muichiro grows weak from his ordeal, he regains his memories; as a child, he was orphaned after his mother became ill and his father died on a trip to retrieve medicine for her. His twin brother Yuichiro became embittered by their deaths. Kagaya's wife Amane visits to recruit them into the Corps but it provokes Yuichiro, who rants about the futility of helping others and how they are fated to join their dead parents. One night, a demon found them and wounded Yuichiro. In a blinding rage, Muichiro defeated the demon and witnessed his brother's last moments, apologizing to him and praying he would survive. Marks then appear on his face, enhancing his speed and strength. He finds Gyokko about to kill Kanamori and Hotaru and attacks him. Gyokko, shocked that he had escaped, uses multiple attacks but fails to stop Muichiro.
53	9	"Mist Hashira Muichiro Tokito"; Transliteration: "Kasumi Bashira・Tokitō Muichirō" (Japanese: 霞柱・時透無一郎)	Akihiko Uda	Yō Miura	June 4, 2023	October 6, 2024	7.3%
With his attacks overpowered, Gyokko reveals his true form, a large merman-like being with lethal touch, before attacking Muichiro again. Muichiro remembers when Amane found him and his relentless training to become stronger, his perpetual rage pushing him forward. Using his enhanced speed and a self-taught Mist Breathing form, Muichiro overwhelms Gyokko and beheads him. His marks fade and he reels from exhaustion and the poison's effects. Kanamori and Kotetsu aid him; the latter was saved from being mortally wounded by Kyojuro's tsuba in his shirt, which Tanjiro had previously given him. Tanjiro, Nezuko, and Genya struggle against Zohakuten's dragons; Tanjiro is swallowed by one and nearly crushed in its jaws when Mitsuri arrives, slicing it apart and saving him, before she confronts Zohakuten.
54	10	"Love Hashira Mitsuri Kanroji"; Transliteration: "Koi Bashira・Kanroji Mitsuri" (Japanese: 恋柱・甘露寺蜜璃)	Yūji Shimizu	Yūji Shimizu	June 11, 2023	October 13, 2024	7.6%
Mitsuri destroys the dragons but is stunned by Zohakuten and knocked unconscious. He moves to kill her as she recalls her past: she developed her abnormal strength, unique hair color, and large appetite as a child. Once a source of pride, she attempted to hide these traits after an annulled marriage proposal caused her to long to be seen as normal. However, it troubled her to realize she was hiding her true self; joining the Corps allowed her to act freely and with acceptance. Mitsuri awakens to see Tanjiro, Nezuko, and Genya rescuing her. She apologizes for her mistake and re-engages Zohakuten with new vigour. He notices that she too has a mark on her neck and concentrates his efforts on her, leaving Hantengu's burl exposed. Tanjiro, Nezuko, and Genya, who reveals his ability to gain demonic traits by consuming their flesh, destroy the burl but Hantengu escapes once more.
55	11	"A Connected Bond: Daybreak and First Light"; Transliteration: "Tsunaida Kizuna Kawataredoki Asaborake" (Japanese: 繋いだ絆 彼は誰時 朝ぼらけ)	Ken Nakazawa, Seiji Harada, Takashi Suhara & Jun'ichi Minamino	Haruo Sotozaki & Takashi Suhara	June 18, 2023 (Note: Episode 55 is a 52 minute special)	October 20, 2024	7.6%
Tanjiro reaches Hantengu by using a Thunder Breathing technique taught to him by Zenitsu, but the demon manifests his resentment, Urami. Genya and Nezuko attack him but Urami and the siblings falls down a cliff. Using the ancient sword provided by Muichiro, Tanjiro decapitates Urami but fails to kill Hantengu. Day breaks and Nezuko begins to burn. Tanjiro attempts to shield her from the sun, but sees civilians being pursued by Urami's headless body. With Tanjiro unsure of whether to save the villagers or Nezuko, she kicks him away, forcing him to kill the demon. He locates Hantengu hiding inside Urami and kills him, simultaneously saving Mitsuri when Zohakuten disintegrates. Tanjiro grieves Nezuko's death but sees she is no longer burning. Through Hantengu's memories, Muzan realizes his goal to become immortal can be achieved by devouring Nezuko. Once a sickly young man from the Heian period, he killed his doctor in a fit of rage, only realizing after that his treatment had enhanced his physical abilities and saved him, though has left him unable to walk in sunlight. Having failed to find the treatment's last component, the Blue Spider Lily, he resorted to creating demons in the hopes one could conquer the sun. In the aftermath, Muichiro thanks Tanjiro for helping him regain his identity and Mitsuri embraces them for all surviving. As Tanjiro is escorted out of the village, the swordsmiths celebrate him for saving them.

== Home media release ==
=== Japanese ===
Aniplex (Japan – Region 2/A)
Vol.	Episodes	Cover art	Bonus disc	Release date	Ref.
1	1	Mitsuri Kanroji	Soundtrack	June 21, 2023	
2	2–3	Muichiro Tokito	Soundtrack	July 26, 2023	
3	4–5	Tanjiro Kamado	Soundtrack	August 30, 2023	
4	6–7	Genya Shinazugawa	Soundtrack	September 27, 2023	
5	8–9	Tanjiro Kamado, Mitsuri Kanroji, Genya Shinazugawa and Muichiro Tokito	Soundtrack	October 25, 2023	
6	10–11	Tanjiro Kamado and Nezuko Kamado	Soundtrack	November 22, 2023	

=== English ===
Crunchyroll, LLC (North America – Region 1/A)
Vol.	Episodes	Standard edition release date	Limited edition release date	Ref.
1	1–11	December 3, 2024	June 25, 2024	
