= List of Demon Slayer: Kimetsu no Yaiba chapters =

Cover of the series' compilation by Viz Media

Demon Slayer: Kimetsu no Yaiba is a Japanese manga series written and illustrated by Koyoharu Gotouge. Gotouge launched the manga in 2016's 11th issue of Shueisha's shōnen manga magazine Weekly Shōnen Jump on February 15, 2016, and ran until May 18, 2020. A side-story for the manga was published in the first issue of Shonen Jump GIGA on July 20, 2016. It follows teenage Tanjiro Kamado, who strives to become a demon slayer after his family was slaughtered and his younger sister Nezuko turned into a demon.

Viz Media published the first three chapters of the series in its digital magazine Weekly Shonen Jump as part of the "Jump Start" program, but did not pick the series up for continued serialization. Viz announced their license to the series during their panel at San Diego Comic-Con on July 20, 2017. At their Anime NYC panel on November 15, 2019, Viz announced their plan to release volumes monthly starting in May 2020. A collection containing the entire series was released by Viz Media on November 9, 2021.

== Volumes ==
No.	Title	Original release date	English release date
1	Cruelty; Zankoku (残酷)	June 3, 2016; 978-4-08-880723-2	July 3, 2018; 978-1-9747-0052-3
1. "Cruelty" (残酷, Zankoku); 2. "The Stranger" (見知らぬ誰か, Mishiranu Dareka); 3. "To Return by Dawn Without Fail" (必ず戻る夜明けまでには, Kanarazu Modoru Yoake made ni wa); 4. "Tanjiro's Journal, Part 1" (炭治郎日記・前編, Tanjirō Nikki: Zenpen); 5. "Tanjiro's Journal, Part 2" (炭治郎日記・後篇, Tanjirō Nikki: Kōhen); 6. "A Mountain of Hands" (山ほどの手が, Yamahodo no Te ga); 7. "Spirits of the Deceased" (亡霊, Bōrei)
Tanjiro Kamado is a teenage boy with a heightened sense of smell who lived happily with his family until one day he arrives home to find all his family murdered except his younger sister Nezuko Kamado, who has been turned into a demon. Realizing Nezuko was not the killer and retained her humanity to an extent, Tanjiro protects her from a demon slayer named Giyū Tomioka and convinces him to spare Nezuko while vowing to make her human again. An impressed Giyū instructs Tanjiro to meet a man named Sakonji Urokodaki on Mt. Sagiri while warning him to keep his sister out of the sun. Taken under Urokodaki's wing, Tanjiro undergoes two years of harsh training before participating in the Final Selection to join the Demon Slayer Corps and passes after defeating a demon who targeted Urokodaki's previous apprentices.
2	It Was You; Omae ga (お前が)	August 4, 2016; 978-4-08-880755-3	September 4, 2018; 978-1-9747-0053-0
8. "Big Brother" (兄ちゃん, Nīchan); 9. "Welcome Back" (おかえり, Okaeri); 10. "Kidnapper's Bog" (人攫い沼, Hitosarai-numa); 11. "Suggestion" (暗示, Anji); 12. "I Can't Tell You" (言えない, Ienai); 13. "It Was You" (お前が, Omae ga); 14. "Kibutsuji's Wrath / The Smell of Enchanting Blood" (鬼舞辻の癇癪・幻惑の血の香り, Kibutsuji no Kanshaku・Genwaku no Chi no Kaori); 15. "The Doctor's Opinion" (医師の見解, Ishi no Kenkai); 16. "Playing Temari" (手鞠遊び, Temari Asobi)
Returning from Mt. Sagiri after passing the exam, Tanjiro learns his family's murderer is a demon named Muzan Kibutsuji who knows how to restore Nezuko's humanity. He departs with Nezuko after receiving his Nichirin Blade from the swordsmith Haganezuka to a town in the northwest where a demon with the ability to split into three bodies has been feeding on young girls. As Nezuko was hypnotized by Urokodaki to consider all humans her family, she helps Tanjiro kill two thirds of the demon with the remaining one forcing Tanjiro to kill him while interrogating him on Kibutsuji. Tanjiro then departs to Asakusa, Tokyo, where he has a short encounter with Kibutsuji while meeting Tamayo, a demon who escaped Kibutsuji's control, and her assistant Yushiro. Tamayo takes Tanjiro to her tower abode and explains to him the nature Kibutsuji's ability to place his cells in other people's bodies to force their servitude with a "curse" added to any who utter his name. Tanjiro agrees to work with Tamayo to develop a cure for Nezuko, promising to let her study his sister's blood and bring blood from powerful demons related closely to Muzan for her research. But they are soon attacked by assassins sent by Kibutsuji – Susamaru and Yahaba – who were ordered to kill Tanjiro (who was wearing hanafuda earrings).
3	Believe in Yourself; Onore o Kobu seyo (己を鼓舞せよ)	October 4, 2016; 978-4-08-880795-9	November 6, 2018; 978-1-9747-0054-7
17. "Arrow Demon" (矢印鬼, Yajirushi Oni); 18. "The Curse" (呪縛, Jubaku); 19. "Together Forever" (ずっと一緒にいる, Zutto Issho ni Iru); 20. "Zenitsu Agatsuma" (我妻善逸, Agatsuma Zen'itsu); 21. "Tsuzumi Mansion" (鼓屋敷, Tsuzumi Yashiki); 22. "Rushing Boar" (突然の猪, Totsuzen no Inoshishi); 23. "The Boar Bares Its Fangs, Zenitsu Sleeps" (猪は牙を剥き善逸は眠る, Inoshishi wa Kiba o Muki Zen'itsu wa Nemuru); 24. "Former Member of the Twelve Kizuki" (元十二鬼月, Moto jū ni Kizuki); 25. "Believe in Yourself" (己を鼓舞せよ, Onore o Kobu seyo)
Tanjiro and the others proceed to battle Susamaru and Yahaba, who claim themselves to be members of Kibutsuji's Twelve Kizuki. As Tanjiro manages to behead Yahaba and endure long enough for the demon to fully disintegrate, Tamayo uses her Demon Blood Art to trick Susumaru into uttering Kibutsuji's name with his cells destroying her. Tamayo confirms from Susumaru's remains that she was not a Kizuki, whose members have their number ranks engraved on their eyeballs. Tamayo prepares to leave Asakusa as the Kamado siblings set off southeast on their next mission, joined by the cowardly Zenitsu Agatsuma as they enter an abandoned mansion that a former Kizuki named Kyogai made his home while targeting humans with a rare blood type. They are joined by another Demon Slayer named Inosuke Hashibira, a fight-crazy maniac wearing a boar's head who fights with chipped blades. Tanjiro manages to defeat Kyogai and acquire a blood sample for Tamayo, but gets into a confrontation with Inosuke when he injures Zenitsu as Zenitsu protects Nezuko.
4	Robust Blade; Kyōjinna Yaiba (強靱な刃)	December 2, 2016; 978-4-08-880826-0	January 1, 2019; 978-1-9747-0055-4
26. "Barehanded Fight (素手喧嘩, Sutegoro); 27. "Inosuke Hashibira" (嘴平伊之助, Hashibira Inosuke); 28. "Urgent Summons" (緊急の呼び出し, Kinkyū no Yobidashi); 29. "Mount Natagumo" (那田蜘蛛山, Natagumo Yama); 30. "Marionettes" (操り人形, Ayatsuri Ningyō); 31. "Letting Someone Else Go First" (自分ではない誰かを前へ, Jibun de wa nai Dareka o Mae e); 32. "Pungent Odor" (刺激臭, Shigeki-shū); 33. "Suffering and Floundering As You Move Forward" (苦しみ、のたうちながら前へ, Kurushimi, Notauchinagara Mae e); 34. "Robust Blade" (強靱な刃, Kyōjinna Yaiba)
Following a fist fight between Tanjiro and Inosuke, they and Zenitsu are led by Tanjiro's Kasugai crow to a manor with a wisteria crest to recuperate. Hilarity ensues after Zenitsu learns Nezuko is a girl and becomes smitten with her. The trio are then set to assist other Demon Slayers dispatched to Mt. Natagumo. Tanjiro and Inosuke enter the forest to face a family of Spider Demons whose mother turned most of the demon slayers into puppets. Tanjiro manages to kill the Mother, who welcomed her demise while warning him that a member of the Kizuki is on the mountain. Soon after, Tanjiro and Inosuke get separated when attacked by the Father who the former suspects to be the Kizuki. At the same time, Giyū is deployed to Mt. Natagumo along with his fellow Hashira Shinobu Kocho.
5	To Hell; Jigoku e (地獄へ)	March 3, 2017; 978-4-08-881026-3	March 5, 2019; 978-1-9747-0056-1
35. "Scattered" (散り散り, Chirijiri); 36. "This Is Bad!" (これはやべぇ, Kore wa Yabee); 37. "Broken Blade" (折れた刀身, Oreta Tōshin); 38. "Real and Fake" (本物と偽物, Honmono to Nisemono); 39. "Life Passing Before One's Eyes" (走馬灯の中, Sōmatō no Naka); 40. "Hinokami" (ヒノカミ, Hinokami; "God of Fire"); 41. "Shinobu Kocho" (胡蝶しのぶ, Kochō Shinobu); 42. "Behind" (後ろ, Ushiro); 43. "To Hell" (地獄へ, Jigoku e)
Zenitsu enters Mt. Natagumo and kills the brother spider but is poisoned. He is saved from the demon's poison by Shinobu while Giyū dispatches the Father when Inosuke is overpowered. Tanjiro ends up facing the real Kizuki Rui as he was disciplining a demon he forced to be his sister, revealing that assembled the spider demons to create his own familial bonds and takes an interest in Nezuko. Tanjiro is overpowered while trying to save Nezuko, causing him to remember watching his frail father dance the Hinokami Kagura. Tanjiro proceeds to use Hinokami Kagura offensively, managing to behead Rui with support from Nezuko's Demon Blood Art. Rui survives and nearly kills the Kamado siblings when Giyū appears and kills him, with Rui regaining his memories and closure with the parents he assume did not love him.
6	The Demon Slayer Corps Gathers; Kisaitai Chūgō Saiban (鬼殺隊柱合裁判)	May 2, 2017; 978-4-08-881076-8	May 7, 2019; 978-1-9747-0057-8
44. "Against Corps Rules" (隊律違反, Tairitsu Ihan); 45. "Trial by Hashira" (鬼殺隊柱合裁判, Kisatsutai Chūgō Saiban; "The Demon Slayer Corps Gathers"); 46. "Master of the Mansion" (お館様, Oyakata-sama); 47. "Hmph!" (プイ, Pui); 48. "Butterfly Mansion" (蝶屋敷, Chō Yashiki); 49. "Rehabilitation Training, Part 1" (機能回復訓練・前編, Kinō Kaifuku Kunren: Zenpen); 50. "Rehabilitation Training, Part 2" (機能回復訓練・後編, Kinō Kaifuku Kunren・Kōhen); 51. "The Nichirin Sword Returns" (日輪刀還る, Nichirintō Kaeru); 52. "Cruel and Heartless" (冷酷無情, Reikokumujō)
After killing the daughter spider, Shinobu targets Nezuko with Giyū holding her back so the Kamado siblings can escape. But they are intercepted by Shinobu's ward Kanao Tsuyuri, the girl who completed Final Selection with Tanjiro. Luckily, the Kasugai crows relay orders for the Kamado siblings to be brought before the Kagaya Ubuyashiki, the Demon Corps leader, and Hashiras, the Demon Slayer Corps elite. Despite the others' objections, Kagaya vouches for Nezuko to be spared as both Giyū and Urokodaki vouch on her behalf promising to commit seppuku should she start eating humans. Despite his objection, the Wind Hashira Sanemi Shinazugawa relents when Nezuko refuses to attack him after he repeatedly stabbed her. Tanjiro then begins his rehabilitation with his friends at Shinobu's Butterfly House and learns new breathing techniques while curious about the Hinokami Kagura he used on Rui. Meanwhile, Kibutsuji has Nakime summon the Lower Kizuki to the Infinity Castle. He deems them no longer necessary and kills all but one named Enmu. Enmu receives some of Kibutsuji's blood to increase his powers and is instructed to kill the Hashira and Tanjiro. A month later, Tanjiro's group is assigned to investigate disappearances on the Mugen Train.
7	Trading Blows at Close Quarters; Kyōsho no Kōbō (狭所の攻防)	August 4, 2017; 978-4-08-881193-2	July 2, 2019; 978-1-9747-0441-5
53. "You Are" (君は, Kimi wa); 54. "Good Evening, Rengoku" (こんばんは煉獄さん, Konbanwa Rengoku-san); 55. "Train of Infinite Dreams" (無限夢列車, Mugen Yume Ressha); 56. "Wake Up" (目覚めろ, Mezamero); 57. "Draw Your Blade" (刃を持て, Yaiba o Mote); 58. "Good Morning" (おはよう, Ohayō); 59. "Insult" (侮辱, Bujoku); 60. "Defending 200 People" (二百人を守る, Nihyaku nin o Mamoru); 61. "Trading Blows at Close Quarters" (狭所の攻防, Kyōsho no Kōbō); "Bonus Manga"
Tanjiro and the others board the Mugen Train to assist the Flame Hashira Kyōjurō Rengoku in tracking down a demon behind mysterious disappearances on the train. Tanjiro is unable to learn anything of the Hinokami Kagura from Rengoku but the Hashira instead offers him an apprenticeship. They are unaware that the culprit is Enmu as he uses a desperate conductor to place everyone on the train under his sleeping spell. Enmu recruits other sleep-deprived passengers to enter Demon Hunters' dreams and destroy their spiritual cores so that they can never wake up. While dreaming the Demon Hunters live out their fantasies. Tanjiro is placed in a scenario where his family is still alive and Nezuko was never made into a demon. Nezuko's attempt to wake Tanjiro up allows him to realize he is in a dream and, advised by a vision of his father, commits suicide to wake up. Nezuko uses her power to sever the intruders' connections to the others with Tanjiro knocking three of them before confronting Enmu, managing to snap out of his spell to behead him. However, the "Enmu" that Tanjiro fought was a construct as the real Enmu had merged into the train with the intent of eating everyone. With the other Demon Slayers awake, Inosuke and Tanjiro manage to fatally wound Enmu.: "Bonus Manga": An unnamed girl lives a meaningless life in poverty, suffering from constant abuse within her family and hunger until she snaps and ceases to feel any emotion. Eventually sold into slavery, she is purchased by a passing Kanae and Shinobu Kocho, who adopt her and name her Kanao Tsuyuri. The latter is infuriated by Kanao's inability to function in life, so Kanae provides her with a coin to flip as a coping mechanism.
8	The Strength of the Hashira; Jōgen no Chikara・Hashira no Chikara (上弦の力・柱の力)	October 4, 2017; 978-4-08-881212-0	September 3, 2019; 978-1-9747-0442-2
62. "Ending in a Dream" (悪夢に終わる, Akumu ni Owaru); 63. "Akaza" (猗窩座, Akaza); 64. "The Strength of the Hashira" (上弦の力・柱の力, Jōgen no Chikara, Hashira no Chikara; "Strength of the Upper Ranks, Strength of the Hashira"); 65. "Whose Victory?" (誰の勝ちか, Dare no Kachi ka); 66. "Scattering Into Dawn" (黎明に散る, Reimei ni Chiru); 67. "Looking for Something" (さがしもの, Sagashimono); 68. "Wielder" (使い手, Tsukaite); 69. "Move Forward—Even If Just a Little" (前へ進もう少しずつで構わないから, Mae e Susumou Sukoshizutsu de Kamawanai kara); 70. "Kidnapper" (人攫い, Hitosarai)
The Mugen Train derails from Enmu's fatal wound when Tanjiro severed his neckbone with his Hinokami Kagura. Rengoku manages to prevent any casualties. Rengoku teaches Tanjiro to use his breathing to close his wound and prevent its reopening. The victory is short lived when Akaza, the Upper Rank Three of the Twelve Kizuki, appears and targets Rengoku while making attempts to convince him into renouncing his humanity and become a demon. The battle ends with Rengoku fatally wounded as he attempts to hold Akaza down to be killed by the morning sunlight, only for Akaza to rip off his arms and flee into the woods as Tanjiro angrily called him a coward. Rengoku leaves parting words for Tanjiro to give to his younger brother and father, who may have the information about the Hinokami Kagura. Rengoku dies after seeing a vision of his mother expressing pride honoring his childhood promise. Disheartened by his loss, Tanjiro pays a visit to Kyōjurō's family and learns some rumors about an ancient lost technique that looks too similar to his family's Hinokami Kagura.
9	Operation: Entertainment District; Yūkaku Sennyū Dai Sakusen (遊郭潜入大作戦)	December 4, 2017; 978-4-08-881283-0	November 5, 2019; 978-1-9747-0443-9
71. "Operation: Entertainment District" (遊郭潜入大作戦, Yūkaku Sennyū Dai Sakusen); 72. "Search for My Wives" (お嫁さんを探せ, Oyomesan o Sagase); 73. "The Chase" (追跡, Tsuiseki); 74. "Daki" (堕姫, Daki); 75. "Various Feelings" (それぞれの思い, Sorezore no Omoi); 76. "In Various Places" (それぞれの場所で, Sorezore no Basho de); 77. "Roar" (轟く, Todoroku); 78. "Wriggly" (ぐねぐね, Gunegune); 79. "Air Hole" (風穴, Kazaana)
Tanjiro and his friends are drafted by Tengen Uzui, the Sound Hashira to help investigate the red-light district in Yoshiwara, Tokyo, where Daki, one of the Upper Ranks, has established herself while disguising herself as an oiran. Once learning Daki's secret, they are forced to confront not one, but two enemies, as she shares her body and the position of Upper Rank Six with her brother, Gyutaro.
10	Human and Demon; Ningen to Oni (人間と鬼)	March 2, 2018; 978-4-08-881355-4	January 7, 2020; 978-1-9747-0455-2
80. "Value" (価値, Kachi); 81. "Layered Memories" (重なる記憶, Kasanaru Kioku); 82. "Human and Demon" (人間と鬼, Ningen to Oni); 83. "Transformation" (変貌, Henbō); 84. "What Is Important" (大切なもの, Taisetsuna Mono); 85. "Weeping" (大泣き, Ō Naki); 86. "Gyutaro" (妓夫太郎, Gyūtarō); 87. "Gathering" (集結, Shūketsu); 88. "How to Defeat Them" (倒し方, Taoshikata); Bonus Chapter: "Inosuke's Fairy Tale" (番外編 伊之助御伽草子, Bangaihen Inosuke Otogi Zōshi)
The Demon Slayers discover the truth behind Daki and Gyutaro and a fight between them ensues. The truth is revealed about the siblings' harsh origins including their transformation into demons.: "Inosuke's Fairy Tale": Inosuke Hashibira is a feral child raised by a boar. He is found by an old man who raises him as his own child, but is mistaken by the old man's grandson Takamaru with a monster due to his boar mask. He eventually learns how to speak, much to Takamaru's annoyance.
11	A Close Fight; Konsen (混戦)	June 4, 2018; 978-4-08-881399-8	March 3, 2020; 978-1-9747-0648-8
89. "A Close Fight" (混戦, Konsen); 90. "Grateful" (感謝する, Kansha Suru); 91. "A Change of Strategy" (作戦変更, Sakusen Henkō); 92. "Worm, Simpleton, Stupid Coward" (虫ケラボンクラのろまの腑抜け, Mushikera Bonkura Noroma no Funuke); 93. "Never Give Up" (絶対にあきらめない, Zettai ni Akiramenai); 94. "Do Something" (何とかして, Nantoka Shite); 95. "Final Moments" (最期, Saigo); 96. "No Matter How Many Lives, Part 1" (何度生まれ変わっても（前編）, Nando Umarekawatte mo (Zenpen)); 97. "No Matter How Many Lives, Part 2" (何度生まれ変わっても（後編）, Nando Umarekawatte mo (Kōhen))
After a long fight Daki and Gyutaro are defeated, but during the fight Nezuko almost loses control of herself and Tengen is forced to retire from his position as Hashira due to his wounds. Despite that, Kagaya Ubuyashiki, the leader of the Demon Slayers, rejoice over their victory against the Upper Ranks, certain that the day of Muzan's defeat is at hand.
12	The Upper Ranks Gather; Jōgen Shūketsu (上弦集結)	August 3, 2018; 978-4-08-881540-4	May 5, 2020; 978-1-9747-1112-3
98. "The Upper Ranks Gather" (上弦集結, Jōgen Shūketsu); 99. "Someone's Dream" (誰かの夢, Dareka no Yume); 100. "Go to the Village!" (いざ行け里へ!!, Iza Yuke Sato e!!); 101. "A Secret" (内緒話, Naisho-Banashi); 102. "Hello, Tokito" (時透くんコンニチハ, Tokitō-kun Konnichiwa); 103. "Yoriichi Type Zero" (緑壱零式, Yoriichi Zeroshiki); 104. "Kotetsu" (小鉄さん, Kotetsu-san); 105. "Something Came Out" (なんか出た, Nanka Deta); 106. "Enemy Attack" (敵襲, Tekishū)
After recovering from the previous battle, Tanjiro departs to the village of Swordsmiths to have his sword restored. Once there, he discovers an ancient, but well crafted old sword that his personal swordsmith, Haganezuka decides to reforge for him. Meanwhile, Hantengu and Gyokko, two of the Upper Ranks, discover the location of the village and prepare to attack it.
13	Transitions; Sen'i henten (遷移変転)	November 2, 2018; 978-4-08-881626-5	June 2, 2020; 978-1-9747-1113-0
107. "In the Way" (邪魔, Jama); 108. "Thank You, Tokito" (時透君ありがとう, Tokitō-kun Arigatō); 109. "Won't Die" (死なない, Shinanai); 110. "Sneaking Around" (あばら屋でこそこそ, Abaraya de Kosokoso); 111. "Pretentious Artist" (芸術家気取り, Geijutsuka Kidori); 112. "Transitions" (遷移変転, Sen'i Henten); 113. "Bright Red Blade" (赫刀, Kakutō); 114. "Wanted: Respect" (認められたかった, Mitomeraretakatta); 115. "To Be a Hashira" (柱に, Hashira ni)
Hantengu and Gyokko attack the Swordsman Village and Tanjiro fights them, with help from Muichirō Tokitō, the Mist Hashira, Mitsuri Kanroji, the Love Hashira and Genya Shinazugawa, the younger brother of Sanemi, the Wind Hashira, who is eager to be acknowledged by his older brother.
14	The Mu of Muichiro; Muichirō no Mu (無一郎の無)	January 4, 2019; 978-4-08-881695-1	July 7, 2020; 978-1-9747-1114-7
116. "Awful Villain" (極悪人, Gokuakunin); 117. "Swordsmith" (刀鍛冶, Katanakaji); 118. "The Mu of Muichiro" (無一郎の無, Muichirō no Mu); 119. "Coming Back" (よみがえる, Yomigaeru); 120. "Trading Insults" (悪口合戦, Waruguchi Gassen); 121. "Abnormal Situation" (異常事態, Ijō Jitai); 122. "A Passing Moment of Excitement" (それは一時的な興奮状態, Sore wa Ichijitekina Kōfun Jōtai); 123. "Mitsuri Kanroji's Life Passes Before Her Eyes" (甘露寺蜜璃の走馬灯, Kanroji Mitsuri no Sōmatō); 124. "Get It Together, Moron!" (いい加減にしろ バカタレ, Īkagenni shiro Bakatare)
After coming to terms with his own past, Muichirō defeats Gyokko, while Tanjiro and the others struggle against Hantengu. While the battle rages on, Haganezuka races to reforge Tanjiro's new sword and deliver it to him.
15	To Become a Marked One; Aza no Mono ni Naru Tame ni wa (痣の者になるためには)	April 4, 2019; 978-4-08-881799-6	August 4, 2020; 978-1-9747-1478-0
125. "Dawn Approaches" (迫る夜明け, Semaru Yoake); 126. "Daybreak and First Light" (彼は誰時・朝ぼらけ, Kawataredoki Asaborake); 127. "The Rumble of Victory" (勝利の鳴動, Shōri no Meidō); 128. "A Request for Instruction" (御教示願う, Gokyōji Negau); 129. "To Become a Marked One" (痣の者になるためには, Aza no Mono ni Naru Tame ni wa); 130. "A Place to Be" (居場所, Ibasho); 131. "Visitor" (来訪者, Raihōsha); 132. "Full-Strength Training" (全力訓練, Zenryoku Kunren); 133. "Welcome..." (ようこそ..., Yōkoso...)
With his new sword Tanjiro destroys Hantengu, and after risking herself to protect the villagers, Nezuko is bathed in sunlight, but to everybody's surprise she is not harmed by it. Once learning of it, Muzan discovers that Nezuko attained the power he spent his entire life looking for. Knowing that Muzan is determined to confront them directly to capture her, the Demon Slayers make preparations for the final battle against him.
16	Undying; Fumetsu (不滅)	July 4, 2019; 978-4-08-881867-2	September 1, 2020; 978-1-9747-1477-3
134. "Repetitive Action" (反復動作, Hanpuku Dōsa); 135. "Himejima Hell" (悲鳴嶼行冥, Himejima Gyōmei); 136. "Moving" (動く, Ugoku); 137. "Undying" (不滅, Fumetsu); 138. "A Sudden Turn" (急転, Kyūten); 139. "Falling" (落ちる, Ochiru); 140. "The Final Battle Begins" (決戦の火蓋を切る, Kessen no Hibuta o Kiru); 141. "Vengeance" (仇, Kataki); 142. "Insect Hashira, Shinobu Kocho" (蟲柱・胡蝶しのぶ, Mushibashira, Kochō Shinobu)
A few months later, Muzan storms the Demon Slayer's headquarters. Kagaya and Tamayo make a suicide trap to restrain Muzan, but just when Tanjiro and the other Slayers are about to strike him down, they end up trapped inside Muzan's hideout, the Infinity Castle.
17	Successors; Uketsugu Monotachi (受け継ぐ者たち)	October 4, 2019; 978-4-08-882080-4	October 6, 2020; 978-1-9747-1061-4
143. "Wrath" (怒り, Ikari); 144. "Successors" (受け継ぐ者たち, Uketsugu Monotachi); 145. "Box of Happiness" (幸せの箱, Shiawase no Hako); 146. "Pride" (誇り, Hokori); 147. "Small Cogs" (小さな歯車, Chīsana Haguruma); 148. "Clashing" (ぶつかる, Butsukaru); 149. "Disgust" (嫌悪感, Ken'o-Kan); 150. "Noticing" (気づき, Kizuki); 151. "The Sound of Bells on a Snowy Moonlit Night" (鈴鳴りの雪月夜, Suzunari no Yukizukiyo)
Trapped inside the castle, the Demon Slayers confront the remaining Upper Ranks. Shinobu and Kanao confront the demon Doma to avenge Shinobu's older sister Kanae. Meanwhile, Tanjiro and Giyu face Akaza, while Zenitsu fights and defeats Kaigaku, a former Demon Slayer and fellow disciple who betrayed their master and turned into a demon.
18	Assaulted by Memories; Kaiko Kyōshū (懐古強襲)	December 4, 2019; 978-4-08-882141-2	November 3, 2020; 978-1-9747-1760-6
152. "The Transparent World" (透き通る世界, Sukitōru Sekai); 153. "Pulled" (引かれる, Hikareru); 154. "Assaulted by Memories" (懐古強襲, Kaiko Kyōshū); 155. "Useless Komainu" (役立たずの狛犬, Yakutatazu no Komainu); 156. "Thank You" (ありがとう, Arigatō); 157. "Returning Spirit" (舞い戻る魂, Maimodoru Tamashii); 158. "Chaos" (破茶滅茶, Hachamecha); 159. "Face" (顔, Kao); 160. "Similar Features, Returning Memories" (重なる面影・蘇る記憶, Kasanaru Omokage, Yomigaeru Kioku)
Shinobu is killed by Doma and Kanao continues to fight the demon with Inosuke's help. Inosuke learns that Doma did not only kill Shinobu and her sister, but he was also responsible for his mother's death. Meanwhile, Tanjiro and Giyu defeat Akaza together after a long battle.
19	Flapping Butterfly Wings; Chō no Habataki (蝶の羽ばたき)	February 4, 2020; 978-4-08-882204-4	December 1, 2020; 978-1-9747-1811-5
161. "Flapping Butterfly Wings" (蝶の羽ばたき, Chō no Habataki); 162. "Trio of Victory" (三人の白星, Sannin no Shiroboshi); 163. "Overflowing Heart" (心あふれる, Kokoro Afureru); 164. "Just Overdid It a Little" (ちょっと力み過ぎただけ, Chotto Rikimisugita dake); 165. "Stunned and Trembling" (愕然と戦慄く, Gakuzen to Wananaku); 166. "True Feelings" (本心, Honshin); 167. "A Request" (願い, Negai); 168. "Never Disappear" (百世不磨, Hyakusei Fuma); 169. "Rumbling" (地鳴る, Jinaru)
Taking advantage of Shinobu's sacrifice, Kanao and Inosuke defeat Doma, while the Stone Hashira, Gyomei Himejima, along Muichirō, Sanemi and Genya confront the stronger of the Upper Ranks, Kokushibo who also is a former Demon Slayer.
20	The Path of Opening a Steadfast Heart; Hiseki no Kokoro ga Hiraku Michi (匪石之心が開く道)	May 13, 2020 (Note: Volume 20 was delayed from May 1 to May 13 due to the COVID-19 pandemic.); 978-4-08-882282-2; 978-4-08-882306-5 (SE)	February 2, 2021; 978-1-9747-2097-2
170. "The Immovable Hashira" (不動の柱, Fudō no Hashira); 171. "Transformation" (変ずる, Henzuru); 172. "A Weakling's Potential" (弱者の可能性, Jakusha no Kanōsei); 173. "The Path of Opening a Steadfast Heart" (匪石之心が開く道, Hiseki no Kokoro ga Hiraku Michi); 174. "Nightmare on the Night of a Red Moon" (赤い月夜に見た悪夢, Akai Tsukiyo ni Mita Akumu); 175. "Respect for Future Generations" (後世畏るべし, Kōsei Osoru beshi); 176. "Samurai" (侍, Samurai); 177. "Younger Brother" (弟, Otōto); 178. "Even If You Reach Out Your Hand" (手を伸ばしても手を伸ばしても, Te o Nobashite mo Te o Nobashite mo)
After a long and hard battle, Sanemi and Gyomei defeat Kokushibo, but not without Genya and Muichirō sacrificing themselves to give them an opening.
21	Ancient Memories; Inishie no Kioku (古の記憶)	July 3, 2020; 978-4-08-882349-2; 978-4-08-882363-8 (SE)	April 6, 2021; 978-1-9747-2120-7
179. "Feelings for Elder Brother, Feelings for Younger Brother" (兄を思い弟を思い, Ani o Omoi Otōto o Omoi); 180. "Recovery" (快復, Kaifuku); 181. "Disaster" (大災, Taisai); 182. "Rage" (激怒, Gekido); 183. "A Clash of Wills" (閲ぎ合い, Semegiai); 184. "Leaving the Warfront" (戦線離脱, Sensen Ridatsu); 185. "A World Without Smell" (匂いのない世界, Nioi no Nai Sekai); 186. "Ancient Memories" (古の記憶, Inishie no Kioku); 187. "Innocent Person" (無垢なる人, Mukunaru Hito)
With the Upper Ranks defeated, the Demon Slayers join forces in the final battle against Muzan. Tanjiro is poisoned by the enemy and at the brink of death he has a vision of one of his ancestors and his encounter with Yoriichi Tsugikuni, who developed the original fighting style which was passed along the generations of the Kamado family in the form of the Hinokami Kagura.
22	The Wheel of Fate; Meguru Enishi (廻る縁)	October 2, 2020; 978-4-08-882424-6; 978-4-08-908381-9 (SE)	June 1, 2021; 978-1-9747-2341-6
188. "Sorrowful Love" (悲痛な恋情, Hitsūna Renjō); 189. "Reassuring Comrades" (心強い仲間, Kokorozuyoi Nakama); 190. "One After Another" (ぞくぞくと, Zokuzoku to); 191. "Which One of Us is the Demon" (どちらが鬼か, Dochira ga Oni ka); 192. "The Wheel of Fate" (廻る縁, Meguru Enishi); 193. "A Difficult Door Begins to Open" (困難の扉が開き始める, Konnan no Tobira ga Hiraki Hajimeru); 194. "Burn Scars" (灼熱の傷, Shakunetsu no Kizu); 195. "Bewilderment" (めまぐるしく, Memagurushiku); 196. "I Am" (私は, Watashi wa)
As the Demon Slayers put their lives on the line to keep Muzan at bay until sunrise comes, Tanjiro reawakens and with the knowledge he obtained during his vision, leads the counterattack against the enemy. Meanwhile, Nezuko, certain that her brother needs her help, rushes to join his side. The medicine developed to cure her demon condition works, turning Nezuko into a human again.
23	Life Shining Across the Years; Ikuseisō o Kirameku Inochi (幾星霜を煌めく命)	December 4, 2020; 978-4-08-882495-6; 978-4-08-908379-6 (SE)	August 3, 2021; 978-1-9747-2363-8
197. "Tenacity" (執念, Shūnen); 198. "The Next Thing We Knew..." (気付けば, Kizukeba); 199. "Millennial Dawn" (千年の夜明け, Sennen no Yoake); 200. "The Price of Victory" (勝利の代償, Shōri no Daishō); 201. "The King of Demons" (鬼の王, Oni no Ō); 202. "Let's Go Home" (帰ろう, Kaerō); 203. "Voices of Encouragement" (数多の呼び水, Amata no Yobimizu); 204. "A World Without Demons" (鬼のない世界, Oni no Nai Sekai); 205. "Life Shining Across the Years" (幾星霜を煌めく命, Ikuseisō o Kirameku Inochi)
By the sacrifice of many of their companions, the Demon Slayers defeat Muzan once and for all when the night ends and his body is destroyed by the sunlight. However, before disappearing, he transforms Tanjiro into a demon, in a final act of revenge against them. With Nezuko's help, Tanjiro's friends help turn him back into a human again and with their long battle against Muzan's demons finally concluded, the Demon Slayer Corps disband. Tanjiro and Nezuko return home with their friends, and the last chapter shows the lives of their descendants several decades in the future, among what appear to be reincarnations of the companions who lost their lives during their journey.

=== Special chapters ===
Title	Japanese release date	English release date
"Special One-Shot" (特別読切, Tokubetsu Yomikiri)	October 5, 2020	N/A
One-shot released in Weekly Shōnen Jump on October 5, 2020, without ever receiving a formal volume release. Plot: A young Kyojuro defeats a demon skilled in the flute to prove his ability as a Demon Slayer.
Demon Slayer: Kimetsu no Yaiba – Corps Records	February 4, 2021 ISBN 978-4-0888-2567-0	September 26, 2023 ISBN 978-1-9747-3602-7
"Interview with the Demons from Hell: Voices from Beyond The Sanzu River" (突撃!! 地獄の鬼取材～三途の川を越えて～, Totsugeki!! Jigoku no Oni Shuzai Sanzunokawa o Koete); "Tanjiro's Status Report" (炭治郎の近況報告書, Tanjirō Kinkyō hōkoku-sho)
Two additional chapters included in the second fanbook of the series Plot: During the events of the final conflict, an unconscious Goto imagines himself interviewing the fallen demons in Naraka, who reflect on being killed by various breathing styles. A year after Muzan's defeat, a half blind and physically disabled Tanjiro resolves to continue his work selling coal with Inosuke, while also receiving a large amount of money from the Ubiyashikis as compensation for his disability. Nezuko cooks and does housework while Zenitsu spends his time lounging around due to his chronic leg injuries, but Tanjiro's intervention motivates him to be more constructive. Meanwhile, at the Butterfly Mansion, Kanao becomes a doctor to succeed Shinobu's responsibilities. Giyu and Sanemi have respectively become more sociable and amicable towards other survivors. Zenitsu attempts to propose to Nezuko, only for his overly loud voice to cause temporary hearing loss in his friends.
