= Ayumi Mano =

Japanese voice actress

- 真野 あゆみ
- Born: April 24; Saitama Prefecture, Japan
- Occupation: Voice actress
- Years active: Present
- Agent: Stay Luck
- Height: 150 cm (4 ft 11 in)
- Website: http://stay-luck.com/talent/mano-ayumi/

Ayumi Mano (真野 あゆみ, Mano Ayumi; born April 24) is a Japanese voice actress.

== Filmography ==
=== Television animation ===
List of voice performances in anime
Year	Title	Role	Notes	Source
2017	Tsuredure Children	Ayane Matsura		
2018	Last Period	Iwazaru		
2018	Dragon Pilot: Hisone and Masotan	Momo Guryo		
2018	Back Street Girls	Yui Nakamura		
2018	My Sister, My Writer	Esaka-san		
2019	Date A Live III	Natsumi		
2019	The Island of Giant Insects	Additional Voices		
2019	One Punch Man	Zenko		
2019	Demon Slayer: Kimetsu no Yaiba	Sumi Nakahara		
2019	Fate/Grand Order - Absolute Demonic Front: Babylonia	Child		
2019	Is It Wrong to Try to Pick Up Girls in a Dungeon? II	Cassandra Illion		
2019	Isekai Cheat Magician	Anastasia		
2020	Mewkledreamy	Kaede Akana		
2020	Is It Wrong to Try to Pick Up Girls in a Dungeon? III	Cassandra Illion		
2021	WIXOSS Diva(A)Live	Tamago Hakase (Dr. Tamago)		
2021	Blue Reflection Ray	Amiru Sumeragi		
2021	The Duke of Death and His Maid	Alice Lendrott		
2022	Requiem of the Rose King	Lady Isabelle Neville		
2022	Date A Live IV	Natsumi		
2022	Is It Wrong to Try to Pick Up Girls in a Dungeon? IV	Cassandra Illion		
2023	Sugar Apple Fairy Tale	Bridget Page		
2023	Demon Slayer: Kimetsu no Yaiba season 3	Sumi Nakahara		
2023	The Dreaming Boy Is a Realist	Arisa Koga		
2023	Reign of the Seven Spellblades	Teresa Carste		
2023	Jujutsu Kaisen Season 2	Young girl (ep 23)		
2024	High Card Season 2	Chloe		
2024	The Stories of Girls Who Couldn't Be Magicians	Maki Kumil		
2024	The Do-Over Damsel Conquers the Dragon Emperor	Faris		
2025	Catch Me at the Ballpark!	Kano Yamada		
2025	Yandere Dark Elf: She Chased Me All the Way From Another World!	Mei		
2025	Backstabbed in a Backwater Dungeon	Ellie		

=== Video games ===
List of voice performances in video games
Year	Title	Role	Notes	Source
2017	Azur Lane	HMS Southampton		
2019	13 Sentinels: Aegis Rim	Track and Field Girl		
2021	Blue Archive	Ibaragi Yoshimi		
2022	Massage Freaks	Kyoko Nagumo		
2022	Azur Lane	Joffre		
2022	Path to Nowhere	Hamel		

=== Dubbing ===
- Deep, Maura
