= Michelle Marie =

American voice actress

- Born: Oregon, U.S.
- Occupation: Voice actress
- Years active: 2018–present
- Notable credits: My Melody and Chococat in Hello Kitty and Friends Supercute Adventures; Anis in Nikke: Goddess of Victory; Nangong Yu Zenless Zone Zero
- Website: www.michelleamarie.com

Michelle Marie is an American voice actress and singer known for her voice work on video games and English dubs for anime.

== Early life ==
Originally from Oregon, Marie dreamed of pursuing acting from a young age. She studied at a local performing arts center until her teens, participating in community theater and musical productions. She began early explorations of voice acting in high school, inspired by Kira Buckland, Laura Bailey and Sandy Fox, she participated in online voice acting projects for fun. She met her eventual husband during this time, and began to teach herself Japanese by memorizing J-pop lyrics and comparing to their translations.

== Education and career ==
After high school, Marie lived in Japan for several years. Initially studying Japanese in college, she went on to teach a year at a Japanese immersion preschool before moving back to Oregon.

During a voice acting class in Los Angeles in May 2017, Marie decided to pursue voice acting and move there as soon as possible. A year later, Marie married her husband in Oregon before they moved to Los Angeles for her to pursue a voice acting career. Within weeks, she submitted her first demo reel and booked her first role.

== Filmography ==
=== Animated series ===
List of voice performances in animated series
| Year | Title | Role | Notes | Ref. |
|---|---|---|---|---|
| 2018 | Re:Zero | Daphne | | |
| 2019 | Kemono Friends | Japanese Crested Ibis | | |
| 2019 | Sword Art Online: Alicization | Fizel Synthesis Twenty-Nine | | |
| 2019 | Cells at Work! | Lactic Acid Bacterium (Black) | | |
| 2019 | Hazbin Hotel | Niffty | Episode: "That's Entertainment" | |
| 2019 | Demon Slayer: Kimetsu no Yaiba | Sumi Nakahara | | |
| 2020 | Magia Record | Touka Satomi | | |
| 2020 | Hello Kitty and Friends Supercute Adventures | My Melody, Baby Kaiju Monster, Chococat | | |
| 2020 | Yashahime | Gyokuto | | |
| 2020 | Gleipnir | Chihiro Yoshioka | | |
| 2021 | D4DJ First Mix | Noa Fukushima | | |
| 2021 | Adachi and Shimamura | Shimamura's Sister | | |
| 2021 | Sleepy Princess in the Demon Castle | Eggplant Seal, Teddy Demon | | |
| 2021 | The Case Study of Vanitas | Catherine | | |
| 2021 | Talentless Nana | Nana Hiiragi | | |
| 2022 | Amaim Warrior at the Borderline | Gai | | |
| 2022 | Shin Ikki Tousen | Indara, Bunken Gakushin | | |
| 2022 | PuraOre! Pride of Orange | Mami Ono | | |
| 2023 | KonoSuba: An Explosion on This Wonderful World! | Nerimaki | | |
| 2023 | My Love Story with Yamada-kun at Lv999 | Runa Sasaki | | |
| 2023 | FLCL: Grunge | Orinoko | | |
| 2023 | Undead Unluck | Tatiana, Mii | | |
| 2024 | The Seven Deadly Sins: Four Knights of the Apocalypse | Elva, Nasiens (child) | | |
| 2024 | Go! Go! Loser Ranger! | Komachi Aizome | | |
| 2026 | Playing Death Games to Put Food on the Table | Kinko | | |
| 2026 | Needy Girl Overdose | Purple Lollipop | | |
| 2026 | Grow Up Show: Sunflower Circus | Akane Yura | | |

=== Films ===
- Deemo: Memorial Keys (2023) "The Girl" Alice, Masked Lady

=== Video games ===
List of voice performances in video games
| Year | Title | Role | Notes | Ref. |
|---|---|---|---|---|
| 2018 | Lethal League Blaze | Jet | | |
| 2019 | My Time at Portia | Dolly | | |
| 2019 | Pokémon Masters EX | Leaf | | |
| 2020 | The Legend of Heroes: Trails of Cold Steel IV | Millium Orion | | |
| 2021 | Demon Slayer: Kimetsu no Yaiba – The Hinokami Chronicles | Sumi Nakahara | | |
| 2022 | Gunvolt Chronicles: Luminous Avenger iX 2 | Kurona | | |
| 2022 | Tower of Fantasy | Liu Huo | | |
| 2022 | Goddess of Victory: Nikke | Anis, Aria | | |
| 2023 | Gal Guardians: Demon Purge | Kurona | | |
| 2023 | The Legend of Heroes: Trails into Reverie | Millium Orion, Shizuku Maclaine | | |
| 2023 | Detective Pikachu Returns | Sophia Goodman | | |
| 2023 | Granblue Fantasy Versus: Rising | Kokkoro | | |
| 2025 | No Sleep for Kaname Date – From AI: The Somnium Files | Hina Tsukiyono | | |
| 2025 | Fantasy Life i: The Girl Who Steals Time | Yuelia | | |
| 2025 | Demon Slayer: Kimetsu no Yaiba – The Hinokami Chronicles 2 | Sumi Nakahara | | |
| 2026 | Zenless Zone Zero | Nangong Yu | | |
| 2027 | Romancing SaGa 3: Destinies United | Sarah Carson | | |
