= List of Demon Slayer: Kimetsu no Yaiba characters =

Characters of the series, including siblings Tanjiro (top left) and Nezuko Kamado (center), Zenitsu Agatsuma (top right), Inosuke Hashibira (bottom left), and Giyu Tomioka (bottom right)

The manga series Demon Slayer: Kimetsu no Yaiba features an extensive cast of characters created by Koyoharu Gotouge.

== Main characters ==
=== Tanjiro Kamado ===
Voiced by: Natsuki Hanae, Satomi Satō (child) (Japanese); Zach Aguilar, Allegra Clark (child) (English)

Tanjiro Kamado (竈門 炭治郎, Kamado Tanjirō) is the eldest son of a charcoal selling family. After a demon attack kills his mother and younger siblings, and turns his sister Nezuko into a demon, he becomes a Demon Slayer to cure her. He trains in the Water Breathing (水の呼吸, Mizu no kokyū) style and later uses his family's Hinokami Kagura (ヒノカミ神楽, lit. Dance of the Fire God), a derivative of the original Sun Breathing (日の呼吸, Hi no kokyū), to create a unique and sustainable combat style. He possesses a heightened sense of smell, which aids in tracking demons and sensing emotions, and is known for his physical resilience. He initially wields a black Nichirin sword forged for him; he later wields a Sengoku period sword he finds in the Swordsmith Village.

=== Nezuko Kamado ===
Voiced by: Akari Kitō (Japanese); Abby Trott (English)

Nezuko Kamado (竈門 禰豆子, Kamado Nezuko) is the younger sister of Tanjiro, transformed into a demon during an attack that killed the rest of their family. She retains enough memory to see humans as her kin, protecting them from other demons. Instead of consuming humans, she sustains herself by sleeping. Nezuko possesses standard demon abilities like regeneration and superhuman strength, alongside a unique Blood Demon Art (血鬼術, Kekkijutsu) called Exploding Blood (爆血, Bakketsu), creating flames harmful to demons. Her most singular trait is her eventual immunity to sunlight, which makes her the primary target for Muzan Kibutsuji. Before this, she is carried by Tanjiro in a specially designed wooden box made by Sakonji Urokodaki, Tanjiro's first mentor.

=== Zenitsu Agatsuma ===
Voiced by: Hiro Shimono (Japanese); Aleks Le (English)

Zenitsu Agatsuma (我妻 善逸, Agatsuma Zen'itsu) is a Demon Slayer who joined the Corps alongside Tanjiro. Trained in the Thunder Breathing (雷の呼吸, Kaminari no kokyū) style, he can only use the first form but has mastered it to an exceptional degree. Despite his fearful and anxious demeanor, he fights effectively when unconscious, relying on his perfected skill. He possesses extremely acute hearing, allowing him to discern people's true intentions and track demons. He wields a yellow Nichirin sword. Following the disbandment of the Demon Slayer Corps, he eventually marries Nezuko.

=== Inosuke Hashibira ===
Voiced by: Yoshitsugu Matsuoka (Japanese); Bryce Papenbrook (English)

Inosuke Hashibira (嘴平 伊之助, Hashibira Inosuke) is a Demon Slayer raised by boars, resulting in a feral and aggressive personality. He fights using a self-taught style called Beast Breathing (獣の呼吸, Kedamono no kokyū), and wields two serrated, indigo-gray Nichirin swords. He possesses a heightened sense of touch, detecting opponents through vibrations in the air. He typically wears the head of his deceased boar mother as a mask. Despite his brutish exterior, he is a highly capable combatant. He eventually becomes a close ally to Tanjiro and his companions. Following the disbandment of the Demon Slayer Corps, he marries Aoi Kanzaki.

== Demon Slayer Corps ==
The Demon Slayer Corps (鬼殺隊, Kisatsutai) are an organization that has existed since ancient times and is dedicated to protect humanity from demons. There are hundreds of Demon Slayers within the organization, but they act in secrecy, even from the Japanese government. The most powerful swordsmen among the Demon Slayers are the Hashira (柱; lit. Pillars), who serve as its elite warriors.

=== Ubuyashiki family ===
Kagaya Ubuyashiki (産屋敷 耀哉, Ubuyashiki Kagaya)
Voiced by: Toshiyuki Morikawa (Japanese); Matthew Mercer (English)
The 97th leader of the Demon Slayer Corps, whose family established the organization. He is a distant relative of Muzan, resulting in his bloodline being cursed with a disease that slowly kills them before reaching their thirties due to their connection with Muzan's blood. He is gentle but firm and has dedicated himself to leading the Corps, garnering the respect of the Demon Slayers he commands. He sacrifices himself to weaken Muzan with a suicide bombing, exploiting Muzan's sadistic pleasure in listening to his last words before supposedly killing him.
Amane Ubuyashiki (産屋敷 あまね, Ubuyashiki Amane)
Voiced by: Rina Satō (Japanese); Suzie Yeung (English)
Kagaya's wife and caretaker, who later takes his place during meetings with the Hashira when he cannot attend. She was chosen by a priest to marry Kagaya and agreed to care for him on her own accord. She also assists in leading the Corps and was responsible for rescuing and recruiting the Mist Hashira, Muichiro Tokito. She dies in the explosion of the Ubuyashiki estate due to staying with her husband.
Hinaki Ubuyashiki (産屋敷 ひなき, Ubuyashiki Hinaki)
Voiced by: Yumiri Hanamori (Japanese); Kimberly Woods (English)
The first of the Ubuyashiki children with her twin sister Nichika and the eldest daughter of Kagaya and Amane, who serves as his aide during meetings with the Hashira. She dies in the explosion of the Ubuyashiki estate due to staying with her father.
Nichika Ubuyashiki (産屋敷 にちか, Ubuyashiki Nichika)
Voiced by: Ari Ozawa (Japanese); Brianna Knickerbocker (English)
One of the Ubuyashiki children and second eldest daughter of Kagaya and Amane, who, like Hinaki, acts as Kagaya's aide. She dies in the explosion of the Ubuyashiki estate due to staying with her father.
Kiriya Ubuyashiki (産屋敷 輝利哉, Ubuyashiki Kiriya)
Voiced by: Aoi Yūki (Japanese); Christine Marie Cabanos (English)
Kagaya's only son and the third of the Ubuyashiki children, who appears during Tanjiro's Final Selection in feminine clothing. Following Kagaya's death, Kiriya becomes his successor, commanding the Demon Slayer Corps in the final battle against Muzan and his forces. After Muzan's death, Kiriya officially disbands the Demon Slayer Corps, as their mission to vanquish him and all demons has been accomplished. It is later shown that he became the longest-living person in Japan, as he is still alive in the present day, outliving his Slayers and associates outside of Yushiro.
Kuina Ubuyashiki (産屋敷 くいな, Ubuyashiki Kuina)
The fourth of the Ubuyashiki children, and the older twin sister of Kanata. After the death of her family, she assists Kiriya in leading the Corps during the final battle.
Kanata Ubuyashiki (産屋敷 かなた, Ubuyashiki Kanata)
Voiced by: Shiori Izawa (Japanese); Mela Lee (English)
The youngest of the Ubuyashiki children and the youngest daughter of Kagaya's children alongside her twin sister Kuina, who often accompanies Kiriya. After the death of her family, she assists Kiriya during the final battle alongside Kuina.

=== Hashira ===
The nine Hashira ("pillars") and their respective breathing styles (from left to right): Stone, Mist, Love, Flame, Water, Insect, Sound, Wind, and Serpent

Gyomei Himejima (悲鳴嶼 行冥, Himejima Gyōmei)
Voiced by: Tomokazu Sugita (Japanese); Crispin Freeman (English)
The Stone Hashira, regarded as the strongest combatant in the Demon Slayer Corps. A former monk, he was falsely imprisoned after children under his care were killed by a demon, leading him to be cynical and wary. He initially distrusts Tanjiro due to his sister's demonic nature, but later acknowledges his integrity. He wields a massive kusarigama instead of a standard Nichirin sword. Gyomei plays a critical role in the battles against the Upper Rank Kokushibo and Muzan Kibutsuji, during which he loses a leg. He succumbs to his injuries after Muzan's defeat. In the present day, he is a kindergarten teacher.
Muichiro Tokito (時透 無一郎, Tokitō Muichirō)
Voiced by: Kengo Kawanishi (Japanese); Griffin Burns (English)
The Mist Hashira, and a descendant of Demon Slayers of the past. Aloof yet secretly caring, he was orphaned with only his older twin brother Yuichiro as family. After Yuichiro was killed protecting him from a demon, the trauma of his death led him to become amnesiac and lose his childhood memories. Initially distrustful of Tanjiro, he becomes closer to him after regaining his memories and coming to terms with his survival. During the attack on the Swordsmith Village, he defeats the Upper Rank Gyokko. Muichiro is killed in action against Kokushibo, revealed to be his distant ancestor. In the present day, he and his brother are reincarnated as infant twins.
Mitsuri Kanroji (甘露寺 蜜璃, Kanroji Mitsuri)
Voiced by: Kana Hanazawa (Japanese); Kira Buckland (English)
The Love Hashira and a former disciple of Kyojuro Rengoku. Passionate and somewhat air-headed, she is unlike her fellow Demon Slayers, in that she did not join the Corps due to tragedies caused by demons, rather doing so in a way to be herself instead of conforming to society. She possesses enhanced flexibility and physical strength because of her dense musculature, and wields a whip-like Nichirin sword. She is pivotal in the defeat of the Upper Rank Hantengu at the Swordsmith Village, and later battles his successor Nakime with Obanai. During the final battle against Muzan, she is mortally wounded and declares her love for Obanai, dying alongside him. In the present day, they are reincarnated as a married couple who work as restaurateurs.
Kyojuro Rengoku (煉獄 杏寿郎, Rengoku Kyōjurō)
Voiced by: Satoshi Hino, Mariya Ise (child) (Japanese); Mark Whitten, Ryan Bartley (child) (English)
The Flame Hashira and successor to his father Shinjuro. Though he comes off as boisterous and eccentric, he is pure-hearted and honorable, as his mother instilled in him a moral code of protecting the weak. He is assigned to investigate the Mugen Train, with Tanjiro, Zenitsu, Inosuke, and Nezuko aiding him in dispatching the Lower Rank Enmu. After the battle, the Upper Rank Akaza confronts him and proposes that he turn into a demon, having recognized his skill and strength. Kyojuro rejects this and battles him, but is ultimately killed. In his last moments, he directs Tanjiro to Shinjuro on his quest to discover more about his Hinokami Kagura. Tanjiro later has Kyojuro's tsuba installed on his new sword to honor him. In the present day, he is reincarnated as a high school student named Tojuro, who is also his descendant through his younger brother.
Giyu Tomioka (冨岡 義勇, Tomioka Giyū)
Voiced by: Takahiro Sakurai (Japanese); Johnny Yong Bosch (English)
The Water Hashira and the first Demon Slayer that Tanjiro meets. He initially tries to kill Nezuko but reconsiders after she protects Tanjiro from him, and directs them to his mentor Sakonji Urokodaki in hopes that Tanjiro could succeed him and possibly cure Nezuko. Beneath his aloof and unemotional exterior, he suffers from an inferiority complex stemming from survivor's guilt during Final Selection, where his best friend Sabito dies after killing all but one demon, leading him to be unconfident in his skills as a Hashira. He developed an additional self-taught form of Water Breathing. Giyu and Tanjiro battle Akaza in the Infinity Castle, and later are the first to face Muzan. He loses his left arm during the battle, but survives. Giyu has a descendant in the present day named Giichi, who is close friends with Sabito's and Makomo's reincarnations.
Shinobu Kocho (胡蝶 しのぶ, Kochō Shinobu)
Voiced by: Saori Hayami (Japanese); Erika Harlacher (English)
The Insect Hashira and sister of Kanae. Her surname, Kochō (胡蝶), means "butterfly", hence her motif. Outwardly cool-headed and optimistic, her cheery façade hides an angry, vengeful figure driven by her hatred of demons for killing her family, to the point of deriving sadistic pleasure from killing them. However, she is caring towards her subordinates, her adoptive sister Kanao, and the Kamado siblings. Due to her small frame preventing her from beheading demons, she wields a thin, sting-like Nichirin sword to inject them with a wisteria-based poison she made. This expertise allows her to assist Tamayo in developing the cure for Nezuko and a mixture of drugs to weaken Muzan. Shinobu sacrifices herself to defeat the Upper Rank Doma, having previously taken massive doses of wisteria-based poison to ensure he would be poisoned when he devoured her, allowing Kanao and Inosuke to kill him. In the present day, she and Kanae are reincarnated as high school students.
Tengen Uzui (宇髄 天元, Uzui Tengen)
Voiced by: Katsuyuki Konishi (Japanese); Ray Chase (English)
The Sound Hashira and a former shinobi. He is exuberant and prideful, always striving to do things in a flamboyant manner. Beneath his arrogant, condescending demeanor, he harbors deep regrets over his former life as a shinobi, including being forced to kill his siblings on his father's orders; he joined the Demon Slayers to atone for his sins and regrets. He has three wives who served as kunoichi and assist him in his mission. He retires as the Sound Hashira after losing his left hand and eye while fighting the Upper Rank Gyutaro. He later assists in the final battle against Muzan, protecting the Ubuyashikis with Kyojuro's father Shinjuro. In the present day, Tengen has a descendant named Tenma, who is an Olympic gymnast and acts in a similarly arrogant manner towards others.
Sanemi Shinazugawa (不死川 実弥, Shinazugawa Sanemi)
Voiced by: Tomokazu Seki (Japanese); Kaiji Tang (English)
The Wind Hashira, who is confrontational and aggressive; even after failing in his attempt to prove Nezuko's demonic nature to the Hashira and Kagaya, he does not accept the Kamado siblings. As a teen, he witnessed the deaths of his siblings and was forced to kill his mother, who had been transformed into a demon. He is the older brother of Genya, his only surviving sibling, and continually shuns him to unsuccessfully have his brother quit the Demon Slayer Corps so he can live a normal life. He played a key role in the battle against Kokushibo, and is one of two Hashira to survive the final battle against Muzan, alongside Giyu. In the present day, he has a descendant who is a police officer along with Genya's reincarnation.
Obanai Iguro (伊黒 小芭内, Iguro Obanai)
Voiced by: Kenichi Suzumura (Japanese); Erik Scott Kimerer (English)
The Serpent Hashira, who is accompanied by his companion snake, Kaburamaru. Harsh and ruthless towards others, he possesses deep self-loathing because of his past. His family, an all-female clan of bandits, raised him to be an offering to a demon they worshipped, as he was the first male in their lineage in centuries. After Shinjuro Rengoku rescued him, he joins the Demon Slayer Corps as a means to vent his rage at his family being destroyed through their association with the demon. He is in love with Mitsuri, being more open and relaxed in her presence, and is jealous when she apparently becomes close to others. During the final battle, he and Mitsuri battle Nakime before joining the fight against Muzan, in which he played a pivotal role. After the battle, he declares his love for Mitsuri and dies alongside her from his sustained wounds, with Kaburamaru's care being entrusted to Kanao. In the present day, he and Mitsuri's reincarnations are happily married and run a restaurant together.

=== Butterfly Mansion ===
Kanao Tsuyuri
Voiced by: Reina Ueda (Japanese); Brianna Knickerbocker (English)
Kanao Tsuyuri (栗花落 カナヲ, Tsuyuri Kanao) is a Demon Slayer and the adopted sister of Shinobu Kocho. Trained as a tsuguko, she is a practitioner of the Flower Breathing (花の呼吸, Hana no kokyū) style and wields a light pink Nichirin sword. She was in the same Final Selection as Tanjiro. She possesses enhanced eyesight, granting her exceptional analytical abilities in combat. Due to a traumatic childhood, she initially exhibits profound emotional detachment, relying on a coin flip to make decisions. She overcomes this through her interactions with Tanjiro, learning to act on her own will. She plays a pivotal role in defeating the Upper Rank Doma, who killed Kanae and Shinobu. After the disbandment of the Demon Slayer Corps, she becomes a doctor and eventually marries Tanjiro.
Aoi Kanzaki (神崎 アオイ, Kanzaki Aoi)
Voiced by: Yuri Ehara (Japanese); Reba Buhr (English)
A girl taken in by Shinobu after her family was killed by demons, and one of Kanao's adoptive sisters. Despite surviving the Final Selection to become a Demon Slayer, she is too afraid to fight on the frontlines and instead oversees the rehabilitation of wounded Demon Slayers who are treated at the Butterfly Mansion. She eventually co-owns the Butterfly Mansion after Shinobu's death and marries Inosuke, having two great-grandchildren.
Goto (後藤, Gotō)
Voiced by: Makoto Furukawa (Japanese); Derek Stephen Prince (English)
A member of the Kakushi, the cleanup brigade of the Demon Slayers. After the mission to Natagumo Mountain, he brings Tanjiro before the Hashira to be put on trial. Coincidentally, he is always sent to recover Tanjiro when he is injured to the point they become well acquainted. He has a descendant in the present day who is a high school student.
Sumi Nakahara (中原 すみ, Nakahara Sumi), Naho Takada (高田 なほ, Takada Naho) and Kiyo Terauchi (寺内 きよ, Terauchi Kiyo)
Voiced by: Ayumi Mano, Yūki Kuwahara and Nanami Yamashita (Japanese); Michelle Marie, Kimberly Woods and Jackie Lastra (English)
Three young girls who Shinobu took in after demons killed their families. They work as caregivers in the mansion, performing chores, and assisting in rehabilitating the Demon Slayers. They are identified by their unique hairpins. They have identical looking descendants in the present day.
Kanae Kocho (胡蝶 カナエ, Kochō Kanae)
Voiced by: Ai Kayano (Japanese); Bridget Hoffman (English)
The former Flower Hashira, former owner of the Butterfly Mansion and Shinobu's late older sister. She was killed in a battle with Doma, motivating Shinobu to take on her cheerful persona to motivate others. In the present day, she and Shinobu are reincarnated as high school students.

=== Swordsmith Village ===
Hotaru Haganezuka (鋼鐵塚 螢, Haganezuka Hotaru)
Voiced by: Daisuke Namikawa (Japanese); Robbie Daymond (English)
One of the swordsmiths who makes swords for the Demon Slayer Corps, and is assigned to forge Tanjiro's sword. He is a hot-headed figure who is extremely dedicated to his work to a fault, angered whenever Tanjiro breaks or loses his sword, and only calming down when he is given dango. After Tanjiro's initial swords break during battle, he realizes his mistakes and weaknesses in his blades, motivating him to improve his physical ability in a nearby forest in order to improve his craftsmanship. He polished an ancient sword for Tanjiro, which later becomes his new primary weapon. He has a descendant in the present day.
Kozo Kanamori (鉄穴森 鋼蔵, Kanamori Kōzō)
Voiced by: Eiji Takemoto (Japanese); Kyle Hebert (English)
A swordsmith who makes swords for the Demon Slayer Corps, who made Inosuke's blades and is later assigned to make Muichiro's. Despite being less aggressive than Hotaru, he is also passionate about his work, and was angered by Inosuke purposely chipping his swords. He is nearly killed during Gyokko's attack on the Swordsmith Village, but Muichiro saves him. He has a descendant in the present day.
Kotetsu (小鉄)
Voiced by: Ayumu Murase (Japanese); Jeannie Tirado (English)
A 10-year-old-boy who inherited his family's mechanical battle doll, which was made in reference to Yoriichi. He is injured by one of Gyokko's demons during the attack on the Swordsmith Village, but Muichiro saves him. Unlike other Swordsmith Village inhabitants, his face is comically alike with the mask he wears, in comparison to the villagers' fair appearance. He has a descendant in the present day.
Tecchin Tecchikawahara (鉄地河原 鉄珍, Tecchikawahara Tecchin)
Voiced by: Yusaku Yara (Japanese); Mike McFarland (English)
The mild-mannered elderly chief of the swordsmith village and a master blacksmith. He raised Hotaru from childhood due to his extremely troublesome nature.
Tetsuido (鉄井戸)
Voiced by: Atsushi Ono (Japanese); John Eric Bentley (English)
A caring old swordsmith who used to forge Muichiro's blades before dying.

=== Other members ===
Genya Shinazugawa
Voiced by: Nobuhiko Okamoto (Japanese); Zeno Robinson (English)
Genya Shinazugawa (不死川 玄弥, Shinazugawa Gen'ya) is a Demon Slayer who cannot use breathing techniques. Instead, he possesses a unique ability to temporarily gain a demon's powers by consuming its flesh. He wields a shotgun that fires Nichirin steel pellets and a Nichirin wakizashi. He is the younger brother of the Wind Hashira, Sanemi Shinazugawa, and was in the same Final Selection as Tanjiro. Genya is mortally wounded during the battle against the Upper Rank Kokushibo, reconciling with his brother before his death.
Murata (村田)
Voiced by: Kōki Miyata (Japanese); Khoi Dao (English)
A member of the Demon Slayer Corps who is sent to Natagumo Mountain. He is one of the survivors of the operation to slay the Spider Family and befriends Tanjiro. Despite participating in the same Final Selection as Giyu, he lacks proven talent due to Sabito killing almost all of the demons, as well as the skill to become a Hashira like Giyu, but his determination motivates him to improve in Hashira Training, to the point he is able to defeat demons as powerful as the former Lower Ranks in the Infinity Castle. He survives the battle against Muzan and has a descendant who is a school principal.

== Demons ==
Demons (鬼, Oni) are a race of immortal creatures that feeds on blood to survive and become stronger with each human they devour. All demons were formerly humans who lost most of their memories and traces of humanity after drinking or being injected with Muzan's blood, becoming his servants and sharing their vision and thoughts with him. Demons possess enhanced senses, regeneration, and physical abilities. Higher demons are also capable of casting powerful spells called Blood Demon Arts (血鬼術, Kekkijutsu), which are unique to each demon.

Demons are weak to sunlight, which fatally turns them into ashes upon being exposed to it. They can also be killed by decapitation with special swords used by the Demon Slayers called Nichirin Swords (日輪刀, Nichirin Tō). Demons are also vulnerable to wisteria flowers, avoiding places where they are abundant and wisteria extract being poisonous to them in sufficient doses.

=== Muzan Kibutsuji ===
Voiced by: Toshihiko Seki (Japanese); Greg Chun (English)

Muzan Kibutsuji (鬼舞辻 無惨, Kibutsuji Muzan) is the first demon, originating from a failed experimental treatment during the Heian Period. He seeks to create a demon immune to sunlight to overcome his own weakness. This goal drives him to attack the Kamado family, resulting in Nezuko's transformation. When she later develops an immunity to sunlight, he becomes obsessed with consuming her to acquire it. During the final battle, he is weakened by a composite drug that suppresses his abilities and is ultimately destroyed by sunlight. In a final act of defiance, he transforms Tanjiro into a demon to be his successor, but he is thwarted when his friends successfully help turn him back to a human.

=== Twelve Kizuki ===
The Twelve Kizuki (十二鬼月, Jūnikizuki) is a special group of demons who serve Muzan and have a special mark of their servitude engraved on their eyes. Second only to Muzan, they are the most powerful demons to have lived. The six weakest are known as the Lower Ranks and have a single eye engraved, while the six strongest are called the Upper Ranks and have both eyes engraved. After Rui's death, Muzan decides to eliminate the Lower Ranks and have only the Upper Ranks under his command.

==== Upper Ranks ====
The Upper Ranks (上弦, Jōgen) are the high-ranking members of the Twelve Kizuki, with some having mutated their bodies to the point that, unlike other demons, they cannot be killed via decapitation. Their ranks were unaltered for over a century and no Demon Slayer had managed to kill any of them prior to Tanjiro and his friends joining the organization.

Kokushibo (黒死牟, Kokushibō)
Voiced by: Ryōtarō Okiayu (Japanese); Jonah Scott (English)
Muzan's most powerful subordinate, who holds the title of Upper Rank One. As a human, he was a Demon Slayer named Michikatsu Tsugikuni (継国 巌勝, Tsugikuni Michikatsu) and the older twin brother of Yoriichi. Envious of his brother's talent, he became a demon to perfect himself as a swordsman without the fear of death. As a transformed Demon Slayer, Kokushibo uses a breathing style known as "Moon Breathing" (月の呼吸, Tsuki no kokyū), which is derived from Yoriichi's Sun Breathing. He dies while fighting Muichiro, Genya, Sanemi, and Gyomei, with Muichiro and Genya dying from their wounds soon after.
Doma (童磨, Dōma)
Voiced by: Mamoru Miyano (Japanese); Stephen Fu (English)
A nihilistic demon who holds the position of Upper Rank Two. As a human, Doma was born with rainbow-colored eyes and pale-blonde hair, which caused his parents to see him as perfect and blessed, and start a religious cult centered around him. After they died, he assumed control of the cult, and, after Muzan transformed him into a demon, began eating his followers under the belief that they would live forever inside him. One member of his cult was Inosuke's mother Kotoha, whom he devoured when she attempted to flee upon learning of his true nature. He was also responsible for killing Shinobu's older sister Kanae. In a desperate measure to defeat him, Shinobu administers a massive dose of wisteria-based poison in her body and allows herself to be consumed, weakening him and allowing Kanao and Inosuke to kill him.
Akaza (猗窩座)
Voiced by: Akira Ishida (Japanese); Lucien Dodge (English)
A contentious demon who holds the position of Upper Rank Three. He despises those he considers weak and offers those he considers strong enough to earn his respect the opportunity to become demons. As a human, he was a teenager named Hakuji (狛治) who, as a child, stole to care for his ailing father before he committed suicide to free him from the burden of caring for him. Hakuji was adopted by a martial artist, Keizo, and trained under him while falling in love with his daughter Koyuki. Hakuji's adoptive family was killed when a rival dojo poisoned them, leading him to slaughter them single-handedly, after which Muzan turned him into a demon. Akaza battles and kills Kyojuro, and later battles Tanjiro and Giyu in the Infinity Castle, during which he regains his human memories and commits suicide by destroying his body and ceasing his regeneration, dying of his wounds.
Hantengu (半天狗)
Voiced by: Toshio Furukawa (original) Yūichirō Umehara (Sekido), Kaito Ishikawa (Karaku), Shunsuke Takeuchi (Urogi), Soma Saito (Aizetsu), Koichi Yamadera (Zohakuten) (Japanese); Christopher Corey Smith (original) Yong Yea (Sekido), Caleb Yen (Karaku), Chris Hackney (Urogi), Brian Timothy Anderson (Aizetsu), Ben Balmaceda (Zohakuten) (English)
A cowardly demon who holds the position of Upper Rank Four. Hantengu shows his true strength upon dividing himself into multiple clones which denote different emotions, each one possessing a unique appearance, personality, and ability: Sekido (anger), Karaku (pleasure), Aizetsu (sadness), Urogi (joy), Zohakuten (hatred), and Urami (resentment). As a human, he was a prolific criminal who boasted of his innocence despite his conviction before Muzan turned him into a demon. He attacks the Swordsmith Village with Gyokko, where Tanjiro, Nezuko, Genya, and Mitsuri confront him. Tanjiro kills him, but he lives long enough to inform Muzan of Nezuko's newfound immunity to sunlight.
Nakime (鳴女)
Voiced by: Marina Inoue (Japanese); Amber Lee Connors (English)
A biwa-playing demon who owns the Infinity Castle (異空間無限城, Ikūkan Mugen-jō), an alternate dimensional space that Muzan made his base of operations. As a human, she was a struggling musician who developed a habit of murdering prior to her performances, as she associated killing with applause. She ended up meeting Muzan when she tried to kill him, only to earn his respect for tracking him and granting her new life as a demon. Nakime becomes Upper Rank Four after Hantengu's death and later confronts Mitsuri and Obanai until Yushiro restrains her, prompting Muzan to kill her to stop him from controlling the castle.
Gyokko (玉壼)
Voiced by: Kohsuke Toriumi (Japanese); Brent Mukai (English)
An arrogant demon holds the position of Upper Rank Five. Unlike the others, Gyokko has a highly distorted djinn-like anatomy with his eyes being on his forehead and mouth along with two mouths being where his eyes would be. As a human, he was an ostracized villager who developed an obsession with corpses after his parents drowned at sea and their bodies washed up on shore. He kidnapped and killed a child before being stabbed and left for dead, after which Muzan transformed him into a demon. He claims himself to be an artist and takes pride in his creations, including twisting his victims' bodies into grotesque, living sculptures. He attacks the Swordsmith Village alongside Hantengu but is killed by Muichiro.
Daki (堕姫)
Voiced by: Miyuki Sawashiro (Japanese); Erica Lindbeck (English)
A petulant demon who shares the position of Upper Rank Six with her older brother Gyutaro. Daki takes advantage of her work as an oiran in the red-light district to attract victims. As a human, she was named Ume (梅; lit. syphilis), after the disease that killed her mother, and was raised by Gyutaro in the district slums they were born in. Her beauty led to success in the district at a young age, until she was burned alive at the age of thirteen by a customer she attacked. She was on the verge of dying alongside Gyutaro when Doma – who was Upper Rank Six then – transformed and introduced them to the Twelve Kizuki. She wields an obi belt made of her flesh, which she also uses to absorb her victims and place them in a hidden cave before devouring them. After Zenitsu and Inosuke kill her, she returns to her former human appearance and meets Gyutaro in the afterlife, refusing to leave his side despite him trying to push her away so she would not have to go to Hell, reminding him of their promise to survive anything together.
Gyutaro (妓夫太郎, Gyūtarō)
Voiced by: Ryōta Ōsaka (Japanese); Brandon McInnis (English)
A misanthropic demon who shares the position of Upper Rank Six with his younger sister Daki. As a human, he was born in the red-light district slums alongside Daki and was ostracized for his unsightly appearance. Ume gave him joy and allowed him to embrace his vile disposition while making a living as a debt collector, only to be mortally wounded after killing the customer who burned her alive; Doma later turned him into a demon. He usually hides within Daki's body and emerges whenever her life is threatened. He fights using his poisonous blood and two flesh sickles as his Blood Demon Art. As dual holders of Upper Rank Six, Gyutaro must be decapitated together with Daki to be truly killed. After Tengen and Tanjiro kill him, he expresses regret over being a negative influence to Ume when she was alive and decides to go to Hell alone to atone for their sins, but he relents after Ume refuses to leave his side.
Kaigaku (獪岳)
Voiced by: Yoshimasa Hosoya (Japanese); Alejandro Saab (English)
A young demon who becomes the new Upper Rank Six following Daki and Gyutaro's deaths. As a human, he was one of the orphans under Gyomei's care; he was chased out by the other children for stealing the temple's money and encountered a demon, which he let into the temple in exchange for having his life spared, leading to their deaths and Gyomei's wrongful imprisonment. He then became a member of the Demon Slayer Corps, learning the Thunder Breathing style from Jigoro along with Zenitsu, before betraying them and allowing Kokushibo to transform him into a demon, leading Jigoro to commit seppuku in atonement. Unlike Zenitsu, who only mastered the first of the six forms of Thunder Breathing, Kaigaku only mastered the other five. He battles Zenitsu but is killed when Zenitsu strikes him with a self-taught, seventh form.

==== Lower Ranks ====
The Lower Ranks (下弦, Kagen) of the Twelve Kizuki, whose membership is constantly shifting compared to the Upper Ranks. Following Rui's death, Muzan kills all of them except for Emmu for being worthless to his plans.

Enmu (魘夢)
Voiced by: Daisuke Hirakawa (Japanese); Landon McDonald (English)
A sadistic demon who holds the position of Lower Rank One and is the main antagonist of the Mugen Train arc. He is intensely devoted to Muzan, having rose up to his current status to be acknowledged by him. As a human, he was a delusional sociopath who pretended to be a healer to swindle people out of their money and was transformed into a demon by Muzan, who originally intended to eat him. His Blood Demon Art allows him to manipulate a person's dreams and nightmares. Being the only Lower Rank that Muzan spared after he slaughtered the others, Enmu is tasked with killing the Hashira and Tanjiro. He lays a trap for Tanjiro and his friends on the Mugen Train, that he later fuses himself to, but Tanjiro kills him.
Rui (累)
Voiced by: Kōki Uchiyama (Japanese); Billy Kametz (English)
A child-like demon who holds the position of Lower Rank Five. As a human, he was a sickly boy who was transformed by Muzan. He killed his parents in self-defense when they attempted to kill him out of atonement; the ordeal caused Rui to forget his human memories. Being a favoured member of the Twelve Kizuki, he gains Muzan's permission to transform other humans and demons with his blood into a replacement family, who he abuses due to his warped view of familial bonds. This causes him to be envious of the Kamado siblings' bond, as he loses his calm demeanor and attacks erratically until Giyu kills him. In his final moments, he remembers his parents and reunites with them in Hell.
Kyogai (響凱, Kyōgai)
Voiced by: Junichi Suwabe (Japanese); Steve Blum (English)
A demon and former Lower Rank Six of the Twelve Kizuki. He is known as the "Drum Demon" (鼓鬼, Tsuzumi Oni). After Muzan strips him of his rank due to slowly losing the ability to eat humans and reaching his limit, he obsessively tries to earn his spot back in the Twelve Kizuki, attacking and eating humans who pass by the Tsuzumi Mansion. He fights using the tsuzumi drums embedded into his body; striking them can change the house's rooms around as well as his position in it, and also allows him to unleash powerful air slashes. Following an arduous battle, Tanjiro kills him.
Kamanue (釜鵺)
Voiced by: KENN (Japanese); Alan Lee (English)
A demon who holds the position of Lower Rank Six. He is the first member of the Lower Ranks that Muzan kills when he decides to purge the Lower Ranks after he questions his expectations, which Muzan sees as defiance.
Mukago (零余子)
Voiced by: Kana Ueda (Japanese); Kira Buckland (English)
A demon who holds the position of Lower Rank Four. Muzan kills her after deducing that she was more afraid of the Demon Slayers than him and interpreted her attempt at saving face as contradicting him.
Wakuraba (病葉)
Voiced by: Sōichirō Hoshi (Japanese); Emma Martello (English)
A demon who holds the position of Lower Rank Three. Muzan kills him when he tries to escape the Infinity Castle.
Rokuro (轆轤)
Voiced by: Taiten Kusunoki (Japanese); Ray Chase (English)
A demon who holds the position of Lower Rank Two. He is killed when he asks Muzan for his blood to gain strength and fight for him, which Muzan saw as undermining his authority.

=== Spider Family ===
Spider Demon (Mother) (蜘蛛鬼「母」, Kumo Oni: Haha)
Voiced by: Ami Koshimizu (Japanese); Allegra Clark (English)
A member of the Spider Family. As a human, she was a young girl who was turned into a demon, with Rui later forcing her to assume the role of "Mother" and have her appearance altered. She can control her victims like puppets using her silk threads, which are attached to them by small white spiders; her strongest weapon is a headless demon corpse with scythe-like arms. She lives in great fear of Rui, and ultimately allows Tanjiro to slay her when they fight, allowing her to be free.
Spider Demon (Father) (蜘蛛鬼「父」, Kumo Oni: Chichi)
Voiced by: Tetsu Inada (Japanese); Kellen Goff (English)
A member of the Spider Family, who assumes the role of "Father". Unlike the rest of his family, his appearance is less human, possessing a spider's head atop a giant humanoid body. He attacks Tanjiro and Inosuke, until he is killed when Giyu intervenes.
Spider Demon (Brother) (蜘蛛鬼「兄」, Kumo Oni: Ani)
Voiced by: Showtaro Morikubo (Japanese); Derek Stephen Prince (English)
A member of the Spider Family, who assumes the role of "Elder Brother" and is one of the two in the family that does not look human, possessing a human head and a spider's body. He has the ability to turn humans into monstrous semi-spiders when his minions bite them. He is ultimately killed by Zenitsu.
Spider Demon (Sister) (蜘蛛鬼「姉」, Kumo Oni: Ane)
Voiced by: Ryōko Shiraishi (Japanese); Erica Lindbeck (English)
A member of the Spider Family, who assumed the role of "Elder Sister" after begging Rui for safety from the Demon Slayers. She has the ability to create acidic cocoons of thread that dissolve her victims and convert them into food. She nearly kills Murata, but Shinobu subdues and kills her.

=== Other Demons ===
Temple Demon (お堂の鬼, Odō no Oni)
Voiced by: Hikaru Midorikawa (Japanese); Ben Diskin (English)
A demon who Tanjiro and Nezuko briefly encounter and defeat together.
Hand Demon (手鬼, Te Oni)
Voiced by: Takehito Koyasu, Aki Toyosaki (child) (Japanese); Kirk Thornton, Jessica DiCicco (child) (English)
A vengeful demon who Sakonji captured and trapped on a mountain and was used for testing applicants for the Demon Slayer Corps. Unable to escape the mountain, he made it his goal to target and eat Sakonji's disciples as revenge, until he was eventually killed by Tanjiro.
Swamp Demon (沼鬼, Numa Oni)
Voiced by: Ryōhei Kimura (Japanese); Sean Chiplock (English)
A demon responsible for the disappearance of several girls, who he prefers to be under the age of 16 or else they would "become rotten". He is the target of Tanjiro's first assignment as a Demon Slayer, and is killed by him.
Yahaba (矢琶羽)
Voiced by: Jun Fukuyama (Japanese); Xander Mobus (English)
A demon who serves Muzan and falsely believes that he is one of the Twelve Kizuki. He has the ability to manipulate the movement and direction of midair objects using the eyeballs on his palms to control telekinetic arrows. He is killed by Tanjiro.
Susamaru (朱紗丸)
Voiced by: Mikako Komatsu (Japanese); Sarah Ann Williams (English)
A demon who serves Muzan and falsely believes that she is one of the Twelve Kizuki. She has the ability to sprout multiple arms and create special Temari, using them as projectile weapons in conjunction with Yahaba's ability. She is defeated when Tamayo uses her hypnosis to trick her into triggering Muzan's curse, causing her body to destroy itself.
Tongue Demon (舌鬼, Shita Oni)
Voiced by: Tarusuke Shingaki
A demon that lived in the Tsuzumi Mansion. He has four eyes and a long prehensile tongue that functions as a bladed weapon. He argued with Kyogai and the Horned Demon over the right to kill a boy Kyogai caught. He was killed by Zenitsu.
Horned Demon (角状鬼, Tsunojō Oni)
Voiced by: Yoshihisa Kawahara
A demon that lived in the Tsuzumi Mansion. He was obese and slow for a demon. He argued with the Tongue Demon and Kyogai over the right to kill a boy Kyogai caught, ultimately ripping off one of his tsuzumi drums. He was killed by Inosuke.
Slasher (切きり裂さき, Kirisaki)
Voiced by: Kentarō Itō
The nickname given to a sadistic and cruel demon that appeared during the investigation of the Mugen Train and was responsible for attacking humans until Kyojuro killed him. He is exclusive to the anime, only appearing in Episode 27.

== Kamado family ==
The Kamado family is a line of charcoal makers and the descendants of Sumiyoshi, a close friend of Yoriichi Tsugikuni and the progenitor of the Hinokami Kagura, which was made as a promise to preserve his Sun Breathing through his descendants. After Muzan murdered them in an attempt to sire a sunlight-immune demon, its sole survivors are Tanjiro and Nezuko.

Tanjuro Kamado (竈門 炭十郎, Kamado Tanjūrō)
Voiced by: Shinichiro Miki (Japanese); Kirk Thornton (English)
The husband of Kie and father of Tanjiro and Nezuko, who Tanjiro inherited his earrings and the Hinokami Kagura from. Despite his frail body and illness, Tanjuro was skilled at using the style, never tiring during his yearly night-long dance in frigid weather and being able to decapitate a large bear with ease.
Kie Kamado (竈門 葵枝, Kamado Kie)
Voiced by: Houko Kuwashima (Japanese); Dorothy Elias-Fahn (English)
Tanjuro's wife and mother of Tanjiro and Nezuko. After her husband's death, she was left to take care of them by herself, with Tanjiro helping her. She managed to support and keep her family happy until her death.
Takeo Kamado (竈門 竹雄, Kamado Takeo)
Voiced by: Yō Taichi (Japanese); Michelle Ruff (English)
The third child of the Kamado family and Tanjiro's first younger brother. Unlike his family, he is more reserved and introverted.
Hanako Kamado (竈門 花子, Kamado Hanako)
Voiced by: Konomi Kohara (Japanese); Ryan Bartley (English)
The fourth child of the Kamado family and Tanjiro's second younger sister. She adored him and wanted to follow him when he left to sell charcoal, but Kie forbid her from leaving. Tanjiro told her to wait for him until he returned, but was killed by the time he returned.
Shigeru Kamado (竈門 茂, Kamado Shigeru)
Voiced by: Kaede Hondo (Japanese); Jessica DiCicco (English)
The fifth child of the Kamado family. Like Hanako, he adored Tanjiro and wanted to follow him, but was killed by the time he returned.
Rokuta Kamado (竈門 六太, Kamado Rokuta)
Voiced by: Aoi Koga (Japanese); Philece Sampler (English)
The youngest child of the Kamado family, who was killed despite Nezuko trying to protect him. She is often reminded of him when she sees other humans.
Sumiyoshi (炭吉)
Voiced by: Hirofumi Nojima (Japanese); Howard Wang (English)
An ancestor of the Kamado family who was friends with Yoriichi Tsugikuni, the creator of Sun Breathing, and developed the Hinokami Kagura based on a demonstration Yoriichi made to him and his family. He also received from Yoriichi the Hanafuda earrings which Tanjiro wears.
Sumihiko Kamado (竈門 炭彦, Kamado Sumihiko)
A 15-year-old boy who is Tanjiro and Kanao's descendant in modern times and resembles Tanjiro.
Kanata Kamado (竈門 カナタ, Kamado Kanata)
A 16-year-old boy and one of Tanjiro and Kanao's descendants in modern times. He is Sumihiko's older brother and resembles Kanao.

== Rengoku family ==
Shinjuro Rengoku (煉獄 槇寿郎, Rengoku Shinjurō)
Voiced by: Rikiya Koyama (Japanese); Imari Williams (English)
The former Flame Hashira and father of Kyojuro and Senjuro. After his wife's death, he spiraled into depression and rejected his duties as Flame Hashira, becoming resentful of the Demon Slayer Corps. Since then, he spends his days drinking at home until he receives Kyojuro's final message, asking him to take care of himself. During the final battle against Muzan, he protects the Ubuyashiki family alongside Tengen.
Ruka Rengoku (煉獄 瑠火, Rengoku Ruka)
Voiced by: Megumi Toyoguchi (Japanese); Suzie Yeung (English)
Shinjuro's late wife and mother of Kyojuro and Senjuro, who instilled in Kyojuro his moral code to use his strength to protect the weak.
Senjuro Rengoku (煉獄 千寿郎, Rengoku Senjurō)
Voiced by: Junya Enoki (Japanese); Cedric Williams (English)
Kyojuro's younger brother, who befriends Tanjiro and begins researching what documents remain from his estate about the Hinokami Kagura and its connection with Sun Breathing. He later sends a letter to Tanjiro describing a thirteenth, lost technique from the Hinokami Kagura, hoping it will help him in his battle against Muzan.
Tojuro Rengoku (煉獄 桃寿郎, Rengoku Tōjurō)
The modern descendant of the Rengoku family, who is similar to Kyojuro in appearance and personality and is a close friend of Sumihiko.

== Supporting characters ==
Sakonji Urokodaki (鱗滝 左近次, Urokodaki Sakonji)
Voiced by: Hōchū Ōtsuka (Japanese); Brook Chalmers (English)
A former Water Hashira. After his successor Giyu introduces him to Tanjiro and Nezuko, he is initially apprehensive due to Tanjiro's kind nature, but agrees to train him. Over the course of training, he grows closer to both Tanjiro and Nezuko, and is overjoyed when Tanjiro returns from Final Selection, as he is the first to do so after a long string of deaths. He gave his word to the Hashira that if Nezuko were to eat a human, then he, Giyu, and Tanjiro would kill her and themselves in atonement.
Sabito (錆兎)
Voiced by: Yūki Kaji (Japanese); Max Mittelman (English)
One of Sakonji's disciples, who was noted for his skill and strength. He befriended Giyu, teaching him to value his life as a gift from his older sister, who saved him from a demon. During Final Selection, while trying to save entrants who were not as strong as him, he was killed by the Hand Demon as revenge for Sakonji's capture of him. His spirit later advises Tanjiro during his training.
Makomo (真菰)
Voiced by: Ai Kakuma (Japanese); Ryan Bartley (English)
One of Sakonji's disciples, who, like Sabito, was highly skilled, noted to have great speed and agility in battle. She was killed by the Hand Demon during Final Selection, and her spirit later advises Tanjiro during his training.
Kasugai Crows (鎹鴉, Kasugai Garasu)
Voiced by: Takumi Yamazaki (Tanjiro's), Rie Kugimiya (Muichiro's) Show Hayami (Kagaya's) (Japanese); Doug Erholtz (English)
Crows that can speak human language and accompany Demon Slayers, informing them of new missions.
Ukogi (うこぎ)
Voiced by: Manaka Iwami (Japanese); Abby Trott (English)
A sparrow who was the only one of his species to pass the exam to work as a Kasugai Crow. He was assigned to Zenitsu, who nicknames him Chuntaro (チュン太郎, Chuntarō), and usually reprimands him when he shows cowardice.
Tamayo (珠世)
Voiced by: Maaya Sakamoto (Japanese); Laura Post (English)
A demon who works as a doctor. Muzan transformed her into a demon, resulting in her killing and eating her family, and being under his control until he was almost killed by Yoriichi, who spared her. She altered herself to allow her to survive on small amounts of blood, not human flesh. She seeks to find a cure for demons, which requires the blood of higher demons for her to study on, and enlists Tanjiro to help her, who offers some of Nezuko's blood and attains blood samples from members of the Twelve Kizuki. She is the only demon besides Muzan who can create demons, but insists on only doing it for dying patients who have no other option and ensures they know the price of becoming a demon. After completing her research on a cure for Nezuko's transformation, Tamayo sacrifices herself to lay an ambush on Muzan with Kagaya's help, poisoning him and weakening him enough to be killed.
Yushiro (愈史郎, Yushirō)
Voiced by: Daiki Yamashita (Japanese); Kyle McCarley (English)
A demon created by Tamayo, who cares for and is deeply protective of her. Like Tamayo, he survives on small amounts of blood, even less than her. He is mentioned to have a "battle form" that he can transform into, and uses paper talismans to share his sight with others, conceal the presence of living things and objects, and reveal what is normally unseen. Following Tamayo's death, Yushiro assists the Demon Slayers in the final battle against Muzan by providing aid to the wounded, battling Nakime, and helping Tanjiro and his friends evade Muzan with his talismans. After Muzan's defeat, Yushiro continues living as a demon to modern times, where he becomes a world-renowned painter.
Jigoro Kuwajima (桑島 慈悟郎, Kuwajima Jigorō)
Voiced by: Shigeru Chiba (Japanese); John DeMita (English)
A former Thunder Hashira who served as the instructor for Zenitsu and Kaigaku. He committed seppuku in atonement for Kaigaku's betrayal, which becomes Zenitsu's motivation to find and kill him.
Kotoha Hashibira (嘴平 琴葉, Hashibira Kotoha)
Voiced by: Mamiko Noto (Japanese); Jennie Kwan (English)
Inosuke's late mother, who was killed by Doma just before dropping Inosuke from a cliff to save his life.
Makio (まきを), Suma (須磨) and Hinatsuru (雛鶴)
Voiced by: Shizuka Ishigami (Makio), Nao Tōyama (Suma), Atsumi Tanezaki (Hinatsuru) (Japanese); Erica Mendez (Makio), Emi Lo (Suma), Anairis Quiñones (Hinatsuru) (English)
Kuoichis and Tengen's wives, who assist him on his mission to Yoshiwara. When they go missing, Tengen enlists the help of Tanjiro and his friends to find them. Suma and Makio are freed by Inosuke, and Hinatsuru is found by Tengen after she tried to flee from Daki.
Yoriichi Tsugikuni (継国 縁壱, Tsugikuni Yoriichi)
Voiced by: Kazuhiko Inoue (Japanese); Mick Lauer (English)
Kokushibo's younger twin brother, who was born with a mark that gave him enhanced perception and physical abilities; he later became a Demon Slayer after a demon killed his pregnant wife. He is the creator of Sun Breathing, which branched into other styles. As a Demon Slayer, he cornered and nearly defeated Muzan, but failed to destroy him despite inflicting multiple wounds on him that never healed. He was banished from the Corps for his failure to kill Muzan and Michikatsu's betrayal. He later befriended Tanjiro's ancestors and taught them Sun Breathing, which they passed on to their lineage in the form of the Hinokami Kagura, along with the hanafuda earrings Tanjiro now wears. He died of old age during a fight with Kokushibo.

== Minor characters ==
Saburo (三郎, Saburō)
Voiced by: Masaki Terasoma (Japanese); Jake Eberle (English)
A villager who offers Tanjiro to stay at his home the night his family is killed out of fear for his safety. He is afraid of demons because his family was killed by them.
Toyo (豊)
Voiced by: Mitsuo Iwata (Japanese); Frank Todaro (English)
An udon street vendor from Asakusa who is passionate about udon and is angered when his customers discard their bowls without eating any. He becomes angry with Tanjiro when he flees to pursue Muzan, but is pleased after he returns and eats two bowls of udon to make up for it.
Teruko (照子)
Voiced by: Miho Okasaki (Japanese); Grace Lu (English)
A young girl, who, along with her brother Shoichi, asks Tanjiro and Zenitsu to help save her missing brother Kiyoshi from the Tsuzumi Mansion. She enters the mansion in Tanjiro's company, where they find Kiyoshi and Kyogai, upon which, Tanjiro orders them to leave as he prepares to face the demon.
Shoichi (正一, Shōichi)
Voiced by: Mitsuhiro Ichiki (Japanese); Michael Johnston (English)
A young boy, who, along with his sister Teruko, asks Tanjiro and Zenitsu to help save her brother Kiyoshi from the Tsuzumi Mansion. When he is separated from his siblings inside the mansion, he winds up in Zenitsu's company. When Zenitsu kills one of the demons pursuing them in his sleep, he believes Shoichi is the one who saved his life when they escape the mansion.
Kiyoshi (清)
Voiced by: Shun'ichi Toki (Japanese); Brandon Winckler (English)
Teruko and Shoichi's elder brother, who Kyogai kidnaps. He possesses a rare blood type known as 'marechi', making him a valued target to demons, who believe eating one marechi gives the same nutritional value as eating one hundred humans at once.
Hisa (ひさ)
Voiced by: Ikuko Tani (Japanese); Barbara Goodson (English)
An elderly woman who welcomes Demon Slayers to rest in her house, who Tanjiro and his group visit after fighting Kyogai.
Fuku (ふく) and Tomi (トミ)
Voiced by: Inori Minase (Japanese); Anjali Kunapaneni (English) (Fuku)
Voiced by: Kikuko Inoue (Japanese); Jill Remez (English) (Tomi)
A grandmother and granddaughter pair of bento sellers at a train station. They meet Kyojuro during his early investigation of the Mugen Train incident; he saves them from a demon that emerges from the train while it is being repaired. Years prior, Kyojuro's father, Shinjuro, saved Tomi and her daughter, Fuku's mother, from a demon, an incident which the former recalls after noticing the similarities between Kyojuro and Shinjuro's fighting styles. They only appear in the anime.
Keizo (慶蔵, Keizō)
Voiced by: Yuichi Nakamura (Japanese); Channing Tatum (English)
Keizo was the master of Hakuji, who would go on become the demon Akaza. They met when he confronted Hakuji after beating several men in a fit of rage. Keizo defeated and made him his new student, teaching him the Soryu style. After making Hakuji his heir and allowing him to marry Koyuki, he was killed when a kendo dojo that wanted his land poisoned his drinking well. In his battle against Tanjiro and Giyu, Akaza sees Keizo's visage in Tanjiro because of his ideals, and after reliving his past and destroying his body, he reunited with Keizo's spirit, who encourages him despite his actions as a demon.
Koyuki (恋雪)
Voiced by: Lynn (Japanese); Rebecca Wang (English)
Koyuki was Keizo's daughter, who became Hakuji's fianceé. Born with a frail body, she grew up sick for most of her life. As a result, her mother committed suicide, and her father had given up on the possibility that she would ever heal. She met Hakuji after the latter was defeated by Keizo in combat, serving as her new caretaker. After she recovers, the two became engaged, until she was died after drinking from the dojo's well, which was laced to kill Keizo. During his battle in the Infinity Castle, Koyuki's spirit urged Hakuji to stop, pushing away Muzan's influence to help reconcile the demon with his lost humanity.
