= Music of Demon Slayer: Kimetsu no Yaiba =

Anime series discography

This article lists the soundtrack albums attributed to the anime series Demon Slayer: Kimetsu no Yaiba, featuring music composed and recorded by the Japanese musical artists Yuki Kajiura and Go Shiina.

== Demon Slayer: Kimetsu no Yaiba Tanjiro Kamado, Unwavering Resolve Arc Original Soundtrack ==
Demon Slayer: Kimetsu no Yaiba Tanjiro Kamado, Unwavering Resolve Arc Original Soundtrack

Soundtrack album by Yuki Kajiura and Go Shiina
- Released: May 26, 2021
- Length: 84:34
- Label: Aniplex
- Producers: Yuki Kajiura; Go Shiina

Yuki Kajiura and Go Shiina chronology
Demon Slayer: Kimetsu no Yaiba Tanjiro Kamado, Unwavering Resolve Arc Original Soundtrack (2021)	Demon Slayer: Kimetsu no Yaiba Mugen Train Arc Original Soundtrack (2022)

Singles from Demon Slayer: Kimetsu no Yaiba Tanjiro Kamado, Unwavering Resolve Arc Original Soundtrack
- 1. "Gurenge" Released: July 3, 2019; 2. "Kamado Tanjiro no Uta" Released: August 30, 2019; 3. "from the edge" Released: September 2, 2019

TV Animation Demon Slayer: Kimetsu no Yaiba Tanjiro Kamado, Unwavering Resolve Arc Original Soundtrack (TVアニメ「鬼滅の刃」竈門炭治郎 立志編 オリジナルサウンドトラック, Terebi Anime「Kimetsu no Yaiba」Kamado Tanjirō Risshi-hen Orijinaru Saundotorakku) is the soundtrack album to the first season of the anime series. It was composed by Yuki Kajiura and Go Shiina, and released on May 26, 2021, by Aniplex. The two-disc album features the singles "Gurenge", "Kamado Tanjiro no Uta", and "from the edge".

=== Track listing ===
All music is composed by Yuki Kajiura and Go Shiina, except where noted.

Disc 1
No.	Title	Music	Length
1.	"Gurenge" (紅蓮華 - Gurenge; TV version)	LiSA (vocals and lyrics); Kayoko Kusano (composer)	1:32
2.	"Family" (家族 - Kazoku; OST version)		3:23
3.	"Brace Up and Run!"	Chiaki Ishikawa (vocals)	2:32
4.	"Survive and Get the Blade, Boy"	Chiaki Ishikawa (vocals)	3:59
5.	"Demon Slayer Corps" (鬼殺隊 - Kisatsutai; OST version)		3:24
6.	"Training" (訓練 - Kunren)		1:18
7.	"The Appearance of Sabito" (錆兎 出現 - Sabito Shutsugen)		1:58
8.	"Makomo" (真菰 - Makomo; OST version)		1:39
9.	"Purification" (浄 - Jou)		1:02
10.	"Water Breathing: Hand Demon" (水の呼吸～手鬼 - Mizu no Kokyu ~ Teoni)		2:31
11.	"Mystery: Tanjiro Kamado: With the Kasugai Crows" (不思議～竈門炭治郎～鎹鴉と共に - Fushigi ~ Kamado Tanjiro ~ Kasugai Garasu to Tomoni)		1:29
12.	"Demon" (鬼 - Oni)		2:51
13.	"Muzan Kibutsuji" (鬼舞辻無惨 - Kibutsuji Muzan; OST version)		2:13
14.	"Tamayo" (珠世 - Tamayo; OST version)		2:11
15.	"Battle Between Susamaru and Yahaba" (朱紗丸と矢琶羽との戦闘 - Susamaru to Yahaba tono Sentou)		2:59
16.	"Nezuko: Always Together" (禰豆子～ずっと一緒 - Nezuko ~ Zutto Issho)		1:17
17.	"Zenitsu Agatsuma" (我妻善逸 - Agatsuma Zenitsu)		1:52
18.	"Inosuke Hashibira" (嘴平伊之助 - Hashibira Inosuke)		3:05
19.	"Water Breathing" (水の呼吸 - Mizu no Kokyu)		3:07
Total length:			44:22

Disc 2
No.	Title	Music	Length
1.	"Natagumo Mountain" (那田蜘蛛山 - Natagumoyama; OST version)		0:53
2.	"Water Breathing: Blessed Rain After the Drought's Welcome" (水の呼吸～干天の慈雨へ - Mizu no Kokyu ~ Kanten no Jie e; OST version)		2:25
3.	"Thunderclap and Flash Six Fold: As the Demon Slayer Corps" (霹靂一閃 六連～鬼殺隊として - Hekireki Issen Rokuren ~ Kisatsutai to shite)		2:06
4.	"Activate Water Breathing" (水の呼吸発動 - Mizu no Kokyu Hatsudou; OST version)		2:44
5.	"The Bond of Brother and Sister" (兄妹の絆 - Kyoudai no Kizuna; OST version)		0:49
6.	"Confrontation with Rui" (累と対峙 - Rui to Taiji)		1:43
7.	"The Appearance of Shinobu Kocho" (胡蝶しのぶ 出現 - Kocho Shinobu Shutsugen; OST version)		0:36
8.	"Giyu Tomioka's Theme: Tanjiro's Battle: Demon Slayer Corps" (冨岡義勇のテーマ～炭治郎の戦い～鬼殺隊 - Tomioka Giyu no Theme ~ Tannjiro no Tatakai ~ Kisatsutai)		1:35
9.	"Constant Flux" (生生流転 - Seisei Ruten; OST version)		2:33
10.	"Kamado Tanjiro no Uta" (竈門炭治郎のうた - Kamado Tanjiro no Uta; OST version)	Nami Nakagawa (featured vocals)	5:30
11.	"Dead Calm" (凪 - Nagi; OST version)		1:19
12.	"The Insect Hashira's Theme" (蟲柱のテーマ - Mushi Bashira no Theme; OST version)		1:46
13.	"Family Memories" (家族の思い出 - Kazoku no Omoide; OST version)		0:49
14.	"Hashira: Confrontation" (柱～対峙 - Hashira ~ Taiji)		1:01
15.	"The Messenger of the Kasugai Crows" (鎹鴉の伝令 - Kasugai Garasu no Denrei; OST version)		1:34
16.	"Natagumo Mountain: Dawn" (那田蜘蛛山～夜明け - Natagumoyama ~ Yoake)		1:19
17.	"The Hashira's Theme" (柱のテーマ - Hashira no Theme; OST version)		2:14
18.	"Confrontation with Sanemi Shinazugawa" (不死川実弥との対峙 - Shinazugawa Sanemi tono Taiji)		1:47
19.	"Gratitude" (感謝 - Kansha)		0:53
20.	"Showdown with Kanao Tsuyuri" (粟花落カナヲと対決 - Tsuyuri Kanao to Taiketsu)		1:11
21.	"Lower Rank Demon" (下弦の鬼 - Kagen no Oni)		1:05
22.	"New Mission: Toward the Mugen Train" (新たなる任務～無限列車に向かって - Aratanaru Ninmu ~ Mugen Ressha ni Mukatte)		2:50
23.	"from the edge" (TV version)	FictionJunction feat. LiSA (vocals); Yuki Kajiura (lyrics and composer)	1:30
Total length:			40:12

== Demon Slayer: Kimetsu no Yaiba Mugen Train Arc Original Soundtrack ==
Demon Slayer: Kimetsu no Yaiba Mugen Train Arc Original Soundtrack

Soundtrack album by Yuki Kajiura and Go Shiina
- Released: December 14, 2022
- Length: 84:49
- Label: Aniplex
- Producers: Masanori Miyake; Yuma Takahashi

Yuki Kajiura and Go Shiina chronology
Demon Slayer: Kimetsu no Yaiba Tanjiro Kamado, Unwavering Resolve Arc Original Soundtrack (2021)	Demon Slayer: Kimetsu no Yaiba Mugen Train Arc Original Soundtrack (2022)	Demon Slayer: Kimetsu no Yaiba Entertainment District Arc Original Soundtrack (2024)

Singles from Demon Slayer: Kimetsu no Yaiba Mugen Train Arc Original Soundtrack
- 1. "Homura" Released: October 14, 2020; 2. "Akeboshi" Released: October 18, 2021; 3. "Shirogane" Released: November 17, 2021

Demon Slayer: Kimetsu no Yaiba Mugen Train Arc Original Soundtrack (鬼滅の刃 無限列車編 オリジナルサウンドトラック, Kimetsu no Yaiba Mugen Ressha-hen Orijinaru Saundotorakku) is the soundtrack album to the anime film Demon Slayer: Kimetsu no Yaiba – The Movie: Mugen Train and the second season's Mugen Train Arc of the anime series. It was composed by Yuki Kajiura and Go Shiina, and released on December 14, 2022, by Aniplex. The two-disc album features more background music tracks, and three singles performed by LiSA including "Homura", "Akeboshi", and "Shirogane".

=== Track listing ===
All music is composed by Yuki Kajiura and Go Shiina, except where noted.

Disc 1
No.	Title	Length
1.	"Mugen Train: Avant Title" (無限列車 - Mugen Ressha avant title)	3:03
2.	"Convergence with Rengoku" (煉獄と合流 - Rengoku to Gouryu)	0:49
3.	"Conversation with Rengoku" (煉獄との対話 - Rengoku tono Taiwa)	1:08
4.	"The Origin of Breathing" (呼吸の起源 - Kokyu no Kigen)	1:02
5.	"The Departing Train's Demon" (鬼の出る列車 - Oni no Deru Ressha)	1:37
6.	"Rengoku's Battle: Part 1" (煉獄の戦闘～其ノ壱 - Rengoku no Sentou ~ Sono Ichi)	1:24
7.	"Rengoku's Battle: Part 2" (煉獄の戦闘～其ノ弐 - Rengoku no Sentou ~ Sono Ni)	1:45
8.	"Big Brother Rengoku: Into the Dream" (煉獄の兄貴～夢の中へ - Rengoku no Aniki ~ Yume no Naka e)	0:43
9.	"Invitation to Dream" (夢への誘い - Yume eno Izanai)	2:17
10.	"Deep Sleep: Tanjiro's Dream" (深い眠り～炭治郎の夢 - Fukai Nemuri ~ Tanjiro no Yume)	3:00
11.	"Zenitsu's Dream" (善逸の夢 - Zenitsu no Yume)	1:04
12.	"Inosuke's Dream" (伊之助の夢 - Inosuke no Yume)	0:52
13.	"Rengoku's Dream" (煉獄の夢 - Rengoku no Yume)	0:53
14.	"Homura" (炎 - Homura; Piano version)	1:41
15.	"To the Subconscious Realm" (無意識領域へ - Muishiki Ryouiki e)	0:36
16.	"Subconscious Realm: Rengoku" (無意識領域 煉獄 - Muishiki Ryouiki ~ Rengoku)	1:29
17.	"Dream Awareness" (夢の自覚 - Yume no Jikaku)	0:35
18.	"Nezuko's Flame and Awakening" (禰豆子の炎と覚醒 - Nezuko no Hono to Kakusei)	1:24
19.	"Lingering in the Dream" (夢への未練 - Yume eno Miren)	2:25
20.	"Subconscious Realm: Tanjiro" (無意識領域 炭治郎 - Muishiki Ryouiki ~ Tanjiro)	0:29
21.	"Subconscious Realm: Inosuke" (無意識領域 伊之助 - Muishiki Ryouiki ~ Inosuke)	0:31
22.	"Subconscious Realm: Zenitsu" (無意識領域 善逸 - Muishiki Ryouiki ~ Zenitsu)	0:53
23.	"Awakening" (覚醒 - Kakusei)	0:48
24.	"Suicide in the Dream" (夢での自決 - Yume deno Jiketsu)	0:48
25.	"Dreams and Reality" (夢と現実 - Yume to Genjitsu)	0:15
26.	"The Glimmering Spirit's Guidance" (光る小人の案内 - Hikaru Kobito no Annai)	1:05
27.	"Versus Enmu: The Battle Begins" (対魘夢 戦闘開始 - Tai Enmu ~ Sentou Kaishi)	5:20
28.	"Insult and Anger" (侮辱と怒り - Bujoku to Ikari)	0:30
29.	"Fusion of Enmu and the Train" (魘夢と列車の融合 - Enmu to Ressha no Yugou)	1:58
30.	"Inosuke Hashibira: Explosive Awakening" (嘴平伊之助～爆裂覚醒 - Hashibira Inosuke ~ Bakuretsu Kakusei)	1:13
Total length:		41:37

Disc 2
No.	Title	Music	Length
1.	"The Train's Transformation" (列車の変貌 - Ressha no Henbou)		1:18
2.	"Tentacles: Thunderclap and Flash: Sixfold" (触手～霹靂一閃 六連 - Shokushu ~ Hekireki Issen ~ Rokuren)		1:21
3.	"Lone Struggle: Rengoku's Awakening" (孤軍奮闘～煉獄の目覚め - Kogun Funtou ~ Rengoku no Mezame)		1:06
4.	"Rengoku's Strategy" (煉獄の作戦 - Rengoku no Sakusen)		0:53
5.	"To the Neck's Location" (頸の場所へ - Kubi no Basho e)		1:58
6.	"Versus Enmu: Eyes of Forced Unconscious Sleep" (対魘夢 強制昏倒睡眠・眼 - Tai Enmu Kyousei Kontou Suimin Manako)		2:18
7.	"Synchronized Attack: Clear Blue Sky: The Train Derails" (連撃～碧羅の天～列車横転 - Rengeki ~ Hekira no Ten ~ Ressha Outen)		2:37
8.	"Enmu's Nightmare" (魘夢の悪夢 - Enmu no Akumu)		2:11
9.	"Akaza Appears" (猗窩座 出現 - Akaza Shutugen)		0:43
10.	"Akaza's Assertion" (猗窩座の主張 - Akaza no Shuchou)		1:38
11.	"Rengoku and Akaza's Fight" (煉獄と猗窩座の戦い - Rengoku to Akaza no Tataki)		3:19
12.	"Rengoku's Deadly Struggle" (煉獄の死闘 - Rengoku no Shitou)		2:38
13.	"Flame Hashira, Kyojuro Rengoku" (炎柱・煉獄杏寿郎 - Enbashira Rengoku Kyojuro)		1:37
14.	"Ruka's Words: Conclusion" (瑠火の言葉～決着 - Ruka no Kotoba- - Kecchaku)		3:27
15.	"Tanjiro's Cries" (炭治郎の叫び - Tanjiro no Sakebi)		1:31
16.	"Rengoku's Final Moments" (煉獄の最期 - Rengoku no Saigo)		3:28
17.	"News of Rengoku's Death" (煉獄の訃報 - Rengoku no Fuhou)		3:15
18.	"Homura" (炎 - Homura; Movie version)	LiSA (vocals and lyrics); Yuki Kajiura (composer)	4:48
19.	"Akeboshi" (明け星 - Akeboshi; TV version)	LiSA (vocals); Yuki Kajiura (lyrics and composer)	1:34
20.	"Shirogane" (白銀 - Shirogane; TV version)	LiSA (vocals); Yuki Kajiura (lyrics and composer)	1:32
Total length:			43:12

== Demon Slayer: Kimetsu no Yaiba Entertainment District Arc Original Soundtrack ==
Demon Slayer: Kimetsu no Yaiba Entertainment District Arc Original Soundtrack

Soundtrack album by Yuki Kajiura and Go Shiina
- Released: March 27, 2024
- Length: 81:36
- Label: Aniplex
- Producers: Masanori Miyake; Yuma Takahashi

Yuki Kajiura and Go Shiina chronology
Demon Slayer: Kimetsu no Yaiba Mugen Train Arc Original Soundtrack (2022)	Demon Slayer: Kimetsu no Yaiba Entertainment District Arc Original Soundtrack (2024)	Demon Slayer: Kimetsu no Yaiba Swordsmith Village Arc Original Soundtrack (2025)

Singles from Demon Slayer: Kimetsu no Yaiba Entertainment District Arc Original Soundtrack
- 1. "Zankyōsanka/Asa ga Kuru" Released: January 12, 2022

Demon Slayer: Kimetsu no Yaiba Entertainment District Arc Original Soundtrack (「鬼滅の刃」遊郭編 オリジナルサウンドトラック, Kimetsu no Yaiba Yūkaku-hen Orijinaru Saundotorakku) is the soundtrack album to the second season's Entertainment District Arc of the anime series. It was composed by Yuki Kajiura and Go Shiina, and released on March 27, 2024, by Aniplex. The two-disc album features more background music tracks, and singles "Zankyōsanka/Asa ga Kuru" performed by Aimer.

=== Track listing ===
All music is composed by Yuki Kajiura and Go Shiina, except where noted.

Disc 1
No.	Title	Music	Length
1.	"Zankyōsanka" (残響散歌 - Zankyōsanka; (TV version)	Aimer (vocals); aimerrhythm (lyrics); Masahiro Tobanai (composer)	1:30
2.	"Those Left Behind" (残されし者たち - Nokosa Reshi Mono Tachi)		2:32
3.	"Entertainment District Arc - Overture" (遊郭編開幕 - Yūkaku-hen Kaimaku)		2:24
4.	"Reprimanding Akaza" (猗窩座への叱責 - Akaza e no Shisseki)		1:08
5.	"Inheritance of the Tsuba ~ Shinjurō's Tears" (鍔の継承～槇寿郎の涙 - Tsuba no Keishō ~ Makijurō no Namida)		2:29
6.	"Confrontation with Uzui" (宇髄との対峙 - Uzui to no Taiji)		1:52
7.	"The Entertainment District Infiltration Mission Begins" (遊郭潜入任務開始 - Yūkaku Sen'nyū Ninmu Kaishi)		2:36
8.	"Arrival at the Entertainment District" (遊郭到着 - Yūkaku Tōchaku)		1:57
9.	"The Courtesan Procession" (花魁道中 - Oiran Dōchū)		0:46
10.	"Zenitsu's Shamisen" (善子の三味線 - Zenko no Shamisen)		1:39
11.	"Inosuke, Information Gathering" (伊之助、情報収集 - Inosuke, Jōhō Shūshū)		2:05
12.	"The Yoshiwara Entertainment District of the Past" (過去の吉原遊郭 - Kako no Yoshiwara Yūkaku)		1:10
13.	"Sensing a Presence" (気配の察知 - Kehai no Satchi)		1:21
14.	"Enter Warabihimi" (蕨姫登場 - Warabihime Tōjō)		0:50
15.	"The Scheme" (たくらみ - Takurami)		1:28
16.	"Misjudgement" (判断の誤り - Handan no Ayamari)		1:14
17.	"Prove Your Rank" (階級を示せ - Kaikyū o Shimese)		0:42
18.	"Sumiko's Revelation" (炭子の正体 - Sumiko no Shōtai)		0:22
19.	"Daki's Presence" (堕姫の気配 - Daki no Kehai)		1:00
20.	"All Set! - Muscle Mice" (準備万端～ムキムキねずみ - Junbimantan ~ Mukimuki Nezumi)		0:43
21.	"Encountering Daki" (堕姫との邂逅 - Daik tono Kaikou)		0:46
22.	"The Battle with Daki Begins" (堕姫戦開始 - Dakisen Kaishi)		3:10
23.	"Tanjiro's Resolve" (決意の炭治郎 - Ketsui No Tanjiro)		0:47
24.	"Sound Breathing, First Form: Roar" (音の呼吸 壱ノ型 轟 - Oto no Kokyu Ichi no Kata ~ Todoroki)		0:45
25.	"Set Your Heart Ablaze ~ Dance of the Fire God: Consecutive Strikes" (心を燃やせ～ヒノカミ神楽の連撃 - Kokoro wo Moyase Hinokami Kagura no Rengeki)		1:26
26.	"Inosuke Bursts In" (伊之助、突入 - Inosuke Totsunyu)		1:16
27.	"Uzui Arrives ~ From Here On, We're Going Flashy!" (宇髄参上～こっからはド派手に行くぜ - Uzui Sanjyou Kokkara ha Dohadeniikuze)		1:31
28.	"Morning Comes" (朝が来る - Asa ga kuru; TV version)	Aimer (vocals); Yuki Kajiura (lyrics and composer)	1:31
Total length:			41:00

Disc 2
No.	Title	Music	Length
1.	"Scorching Bone, Blazing Sun" (灼骨炎陽 - Shakkotuenyou)		2:43
2.	"Astonishing Regeneration Speed ~ Demonified Nezuko" (驚異の再生速度～鬼化禰豆子 - Kyoui no Saiseisokudo ~ Onika Nezuko)		2:14
3.	"Little Bunny of the Hill" (小山の子うさぎ - Koyama no Kousagi)		0:42
4.	"Nezuko Remembered" (思い出した禰豆子 - Omoidashita Nezuko)		1:04
5.	"Wailing Daki" (泣きじゃくる堕姫 - Nakijyakuru Daki)		0:47
6.	"Gyutaro Appears" (妓夫太郎の出現 - Gyutaro no Shutsugen)		1:53
7.	"The Battle with Gyutaro Begins" (妓夫太郎、戦闘開始 - Gyutaro Sentou Kaishi)		3:45
8.	"Hinatsuru's Kunai ~ A Desperate Counterattack" (雛鶴のくない～起死回生の一手 - Hinatsuru no Kunai ~ Kishikaisei no Itte)		1:38
9.	"Uzui Paying Respects" (宇髄の墓参り - Uzui no Hakamairi)		0:59
10.	"Daki Defeated" (堕姫撃破 - Daki Gekiha)		3:29
11.	"Demon Slayer Corps on the Brink of Death" (瀕死の鬼殺隊 - Hinshi no Kisatsutai)		0:42
12.	"One Step Away from Defeat ~ Thunderclap and Flash: Godspeed" (討伐まであと一歩～霹靂一閃 神速 - Toubatumade ato Ippo ~ Hekireki Issen Shinsoku)		2:04
13.	"Gyutaro's Fierce Attack ~ The Score's Completion" (妓夫太郎の猛攻～譜面の完成 - Gyutaro no Moukou ~ Fumen no Kansei)		2:15
14.	"Conclusion: Battle with Daki and Gyutaro" (決着 堕姫、妓夫太郎戦 - Kecchaku Daki Gyutaro Sen)		2:46
15.	"Entertainment District Collapse" (遊郭崩壊 - Yukauhoukai)		2:06
16.	"Battle's End ~ Nezuko's Flames" (戦いの終焉～禰豆子の炎 - Tatakai no Shuuen ~ Nezuko no Honoo)		1:49
17.	"Uzui's Detoxification" (宇髄の解毒 - Uzui no Gedoku)		0:48
18.	"No Matter How Many Times We're Reborn" (何度生まれ変わっても - Nando Umarekawattemo)		1:48
19.	"Grand Finale" (大団円 - Daidanen)		3:23
20.	"Zankyōsanka" (残響散歌 - Zankyōsanka; long intro version)	Aimer (vocals); aimerrhythm (lyrics); Masahiro Tobanai (composer)	3:41

== Demon Slayer: Kimetsu no Yaiba Swordsmith Village Arc Original Soundtrack ==
Demon Slayer: Kimetsu no Yaiba Swordsmith Village Arc Original Soundtrack

Soundtrack album by Yuki Kajiura and Go Shiina
- Released: February 26, 2025
- Length: 79:44
- Label: Aniplex
- Producers: Masanori Miyake; Yuma Takahashi

Yuki Kajiura and Go Shiina chronology
Demon Slayer: Kimetsu no Yaiba Entertainment District Arc Original Soundtrack (2024)	Demon Slayer: Kimetsu no Yaiba Swordsmith Village Arc Original Soundtrack (2025)	Demon Slayer: Kimetsu no Yaiba Hashira Training Arc Original Soundtrack (2026)

Singles from Demon Slayer: Kimetsu no Yaiba Swordsmith Village Arc Original Soundtrack
- 1. "Kizuna no Kiseki/Koi Kogare" Released: May 31, 2023; 2. "Kamado Nezuko no Uta" Released: June 20, 2023

Demon Slayer: Kimetsu no Yaiba Swordsmith Village Arc Original Soundtrack (「鬼滅の刃」刀鍛冶の里編 オリジナルサウンドトラック, Kimetsu no Yaiba Katanakaji no Sato-hen Orijinaru Saundotorakku) is the soundtrack album to the third season's Swordsmith Village Arc of the anime series. It was composed by Yuki Kajiura and Go Shiina, and released on February 26, 2025, by Aniplex. The two-disc album features more background music tracks, and singles "Kizuna no Kiseki", "Koi Kogare", and "Kamado Nezuko no Uta".

=== Track listing ===
All music is composed by Yuki Kajiura and Go Shiina, except where noted.

Disc 1
No.	Title	Music	Length
1.	"Kizuna no Kiseki" (絆ノ奇跡 - Kizuna no Kiseki; TV version)	Man with a Mission and Milet (vocals); Jean-Ken Johnny (lyrics and composer)	1:32
2.	"Akaza, Infinity Castle Tour" (猗窩座、無限城回遊 - Akaza Mugen-jō Kaiyu)		1:36
3.	"Upper Rank Gathering" (上弦集結 - Jogenshuketsu)		4:04
4.	"Inosuke Sticking to the Ceiling" (天井に張りつく伊之助 - Tenjo ni Haritsuku Inosuke)		1:45
5.	"Visiting the Village" (里の見学 - Sate no Kengaku)		1:05
6.	"Kanroji's Reason for Joining the Corps" (甘露寺の入隊理由 - Kanroji no Nyutairiyu)		0:36
7.	"Secret Weapon" (秘密の武器 - Himitsu no Buki)		1:41
8.	"The Swordsmith Village Arc Begins" (刀鍛冶の里編開幕 - Katanakaji no Sato Hen Kaimaku)		2:34
9.	"The Importance of Swordsmiths" (刀鍛冶の重要性 - Katanakaji no Juyosei)		1:01
10.	"Training with Yoriichi Type Zero" (縁壱零式との修業 - Yoriichizeroshiki tono Shugyo)		1:19
11.	"The Results of Training with Yoriichi Type Zero" (縁壱零式との修業の成果 - Yoriichizeroshiki tono Shugyo no Seika)		1:02
12.	"A Sword from Over 300 Years Ago" (三百年以上前の刀 - Sanbyakunen Ijo Mae no Katana)		0:41
13.	"Upper Rank Invasion" (上弦襲来 - Jogenshurai)		1:33
14.	"Hantengu's Attack" (半天狗襲撃 - Hantengu Shugeki)		1:49
15.	"Genya's Shooting" (玄弥の銃撃 - Genya no Jugeki)		2:02
16.	"The Master and Tokito" (お館様と時透 - Oyakata-sama to Tokito)		1:40
17.	"Kanroji Dashing Through the Forest" (森を駆ける甘露寺 - Mori wo Kakeru Kanroji)		0:29
18.	"Water Prison Pot ~ Hinokami Kagura: Sun Halo Dragon Head Dance" (水獄鉢～ヒノカミ神楽 日暈の龍 頭舞い - Suigokubachi ~ Hinokami Kagura ~ Nichiun no Ryu Kaburimai)		4:52
19.	"Pursuit of the Fifth Body ~ Unbreakable Neck" (五体目の追跡～斬れない頸 - Gotaime no Tsuiseki ~ Kirenai Kubi)		1:25
20.	"Genya's Remorse" (玄弥の後悔 - Genya no Kokai)		1:13
21.	"Genya's Resignation, Tanjiro's Encouragement" (諦めの玄弥、炭治郎の鼓舞 - Akirame no Genya, Tanjiro no Kobu)		3:08
22.	"Koi Kogare" (コイコガレ - Koi Kogare; TV version)	Man with a Mission and Milet (vocals); Yuki Kajiura (lyrics and composer)	1:32
Total length:			38:39

Disc 2
No.	Title	Music	Length
1.	"Zohakuten Appears" (憎珀天登場 - Zohakuten Tojo)		1:36
2.	"Haganezuka, Incredible Concentration" (鋼鐵塚、脅威の集中力 - Haganezuka, Kyoi no Shutyuryoku)		2:01
3.	"Tokito, In Fading Consciousness" (時透、薄れゆく意識の中で - Tokito, Usureyuku Ishiki no Naka de)		1:40
4.	"Yuichiro's Rage ~ "Mu" Stands for "Infinity"" (有一郎の怒り～無限の無 - Yuichiro no Ikari ~ Mugen no Mu)		1:25
5.	"Mist Breathing Fifth Form: Sea of Clouds and Haze" (霞の呼吸 伍ノ型 霞雲の海 - Kasumi no Kokyu Go no Kata Kaun no Umi)		2:04
6.	"Verbal Battle with Gyokko ~ Fierce Fight" (玉壺との舌戦～激闘 - Gyokko tono Zessen ~ Gekito)		2:37
7.	"Mist Breathing Seventh Form: Obscuring Clouds" (霞の呼吸 漆ノ型 朧 - Kasumi no Kokyu Siti no Kata Oboro)		0:45
8.	"The Family That Embraces Tokito ~ Fierce Battle with the Snake Dragon" (時透を包み込む家族～石竜子との激闘 - Tokito wo Tutumikomu Kazoku ~ Tokage tono Gekito)		3:06
9.	"Kanroji Swoops Down Upon a Moonlit Night" (月夜に舞い降りる甘露寺 - Tsukiyo ni Maioriru Kanroji)		0:35
10.	"Because I'm Angry!" (私怒ってるから！ - Watashi Okotterukara~)		0:28
11.	"Kanroji vs. Zohakuten" (甘露寺対憎珀天 - Kanroji tai Zohakuten)		1:38
12.	"A Place Where I Can Be Me" (私のままの私が居られる場所 - Watashi no mama no Watashi ga Irareru Basho)		0:47
13.	"I'm Going to Protect You All" (みんな私が守るからね - Minna Watashi ga Mamoru karane)		1:43
14.	"Dancing Flash" (円舞一閃 - Enbuissen)		1:21
15.	"Daybreak and First Light" (彼は誰時・朝ぼらけ - Kahataredoki Asaborake)		3:45
16.	"Kamado Nezuko no Uta" (竈門禰豆子のうた - Nezuko Kamado no Uta; Full version)	Nami Nakagawa (featured vocals)	11:15
17.	"Joyful Kibutsuji" (歓喜の鬼舞辻 - Kanki no Kibutsuji)		1:25
18.	"Thank Goodness ~ Tamayo's Letter" (よかったぁぁぁ～珠世の手紙 - Yokata ~ Yamayo no Tegami)		2:00
19.	"A Thankful Farewell" (感謝の見送り - Kansha no Miokuri)		0:54
Total length:			41:05

== Demon Slayer: Kimetsu no Yaiba Hashira Training Arc Original Soundtrack ==
Demon Slayer: Kimetsu no Yaiba Hashira Training Arc Original Soundtrack

Soundtrack album by Yuki Kajiura and Go Shiina
- Released: March 25, 2026
- Length: 84:16
- Label: Aniplex
- Producers: Masanori Miyake; Yuma Takahashi

Yuki Kajiura and Go Shiina chronology
Demon Slayer: Kimetsu no Yaiba Swordsmith Village Arc Original Soundtrack (2025)	Demon Slayer: Kimetsu no Yaiba Hashira Training Arc Original Soundtrack (2026)

Singles from Demon Slayer: Kimetsu no Yaiba Swordsmith Village Arc Original Soundtrack
- 1. "Mugen/Tokoshie" Released: June 5, 2024

Demon Slayer: Kimetsu no Yaiba Hashira Training Arc Original Soundtrack (「鬼滅の刃」柱稽古編オリジナルサウンドトラック, Kimetsu no Yaiba Hashira Geiko-hen Orijinaru Saundotorakku) is the soundtrack album to the fourth season's Hashira Training Arc of the anime series. It was composed by Yuki Kajiura and Go Shiina, and released on March 25, 2026, by Aniplex. The two-disc album features more background music tracks, and singles "Mugen" and "Tokoshie".

=== Track listing ===
All music is composed by Yuki Kajiura and Go Shiina, except where noted.

Disc 1
No.	Title	Music	Length
1.	"Mugen" (夢幻 - Mugen; TV version)	My First Story and Hyde (vocals); Yuki Kajiura (lyrics and composer)	1:33
2.	"The Wind Hashira and Serpent Hashira's mission" (風柱・蛇柱の任務 - Kazebashira Hebibashira no Ninmu)		6:29
3.	"Kanao's return" (カナヲの帰還 - Kanao no Kikan)		2:37
4.	"Tanjiro's Amazing Appetite" (炭治郎、驚異の食欲 - Tanjirou Kyoui no Shokuyoku)		0:26
5.	"Pillar Meeting with Amane" (あまねとの柱合会議 - Amane tono Chuugou Kaigi)		1:48
6.	"Those Who Have the Mark" (痣の発現者 - Aza no Hatsugensha)		0:48
7.	"The Conflict Between Tomioka and Shinazugawa" (冨岡と不死川の対立 - Tomioka to Shinazugawa no Tairitsu)		1:02
8.	"Explanation of Pillar Training" (柱稽古の解説 - Hashirageiko no Kaisetsu)		2:02
9.	"Amane's Tears" (あまねの涙 - Amane no Namida)		2:06
10.	"Request for Cooperation from Tamayo" (珠世への協力依頼 - Tamayo Heno Kyouryoku Irai)		0:44
11.	"Pillar Training Arc Begins" (柱稽古編開幕 - Hashirageikohen Kaimaku)		2:39
12.	"A Letter from the Master" (お館様からの手紙 - Oyakatasama Karano Tegami)		0:56
13.	"I'm Not a Hashira" (俺は柱じゃない - Ore ha Hashira Janai)		1:21
14.	"Giyu and Sabito" (義勇と錆兎 - Giyuu to Sabito)		1:25
15.	"Giyu's Pain" (義勇の痛み - Giyuu no Itami)		2:41
16.	"Tanjiro's Brilliant Idea" (炭治郎の名案 - Tanjirou no Meian)		0:25
17.	"Basic Physical Fitness Training Part 4" (基礎体力向上訓練其ノ肆 - Kiso Tairyoku Koujou Kunren Sonoyon)		0:27
18.	"Patrolling the Town" (街の巡回 - Machi no Junkai)		1:00
19.	"The Calm Before the Storm" (嵐の前の静けさ - Arashi no Mae no Shizukesa)		1:47
20.	"Special Training in the Darkness Part 2" (暗闇の特別訓練其ノ弐 - Kurayami no Tokubetsu Kunren Sononi)		1:48
21.	"The Hope the Demon Slayers Found: Tanjiro Moves On to the Next Training" (隊士たちが見出した希望～炭治郎次の訓練へ - Taishitachi ga Miidashita Kibou ~ Tanjirou tsugi no Kunren he)		2:10
22.	"High-Speed Movement Training" (高速移動の稽古 - Kousoku idou no Keiko)		0:36
23.	"Wind Hashira vs. Serpent Hashira" (風柱対蛇柱 - Kazebashira tai Hebibashira)		0:30
24.	"Mist Hashira vs. Wind Hashira and Serpent Hashira" (霞柱対風柱と蛇柱 - Kasumibashira tai Kazebashira to Hebibashira)		0:36
25.	"Tokito's True Intentions" (時透の真意 - Tokitou no Shini)		0:49
26.	"High-Speed Movement Training Ends" (高速移動の稽古終了 - Kousoku Idou no Keiko Shuuryou)		1:01
27.	"Paper Airplane Throwing Competition with Everyone" (みんなで紙飛行機飛ばし合い競争 - Minna de Kamihikouki Tobashiai Kyousou)		3:13
Total length:			43:03

Disc 2
No.	Title	Music	Length
1.	"Welcome to My Home Part 2" (おいでませ我が家へ其ノ弐 - Oidemase Wagaya he Sononi)		1:07
2.	"Kanroji's stretching begins" (甘露寺の柔軟開始 - Kanroji no Juunan Kaishi)		0:26
3.	"Instruction on Correcting Sword Technique" (太刀筋矯正訓練の指南 - Tachisuji Kyousei Kunren no Shinan)		0:24
4.	"Iguro's Training Part 3" (伊黒の稽古其ノ参 - Iguro no Keiko Sonosan)		1:16
5.	"Big Fight with Shinazugawa" (不死川との大喧嘩 - Shinazugawa tono Oogenka)		3:24
6.	"Welcome to My Training Ground" (ようこそ我が修業場へ - Youkoso waga Shugyouba he)		0:34
7.	"The Warmth of the Rock" (岩の温もり - Iwa no Mukumori)		0:20
8.	"Wake up, Inosuke!!: Nenbutsu, Nenbutsu" (起きろ伊之助!!~念仏、念仏 - Okiro Inosuke!! ~ Nenbutsu, nenbutsu)		0:59
9.	"Nakime and Kibutsuji" (鳴女と鬼舞辻󠄀 - Nakime to Kibutsuji)		0:50
10.	"Practice of Repetitive Actions" (反復動作の実践 - Hanpuku Dousa no Jissen)		1:22
11.	"Tanjiro and Inosuke Pushing Rocks" (炭治郎と伊之助の岩押し - Tanjirou to Inosuke no Iwa Oshi)		1:25
12.	"I Acknowledge You" (私は君を認める - Watashi ha Kimi wo Mitomeru)		0:29
13.	"Himejima's Imprisonment" (悲鳴嶼の投獄 - Himejima no Tougoku)		0:47
14.	"You Are a Special Child" (君は特別な子だ - Kimi ha Tokubetsu na Koda)		0:47
15.	"Muzan Kibutsuji's Invasion" (鬼舞辻󠄀無惨侵入 - Kibutsuji Muzan Shinnyuu)		1:45
16.	"Tokoshie" (永久 -トコシエ - Tokoshie; TV Long version)	My First Story and Hyde (vocals); Yuki Kajiura (lyrics and composer)	4:03
17.	"A Thousand Years of Karma" (千年の因縁 - Sennen no innen)		1:41
18.	"Children's Song ~Human Feelings Are Eternal" (わらべうた～人の想いこそが永遠 - Warabeuta ~ Hito no Omoi Koso ga Eien)		4:44
19.	"Ubuyashiki Mansion Explosion" (産屋敷邸爆発 - Ubuyashiki tei Bakuhatsu)		1:15
20.	"Ubuyashiki's Strategy" (産屋敷の策略 - Ubuyashiki no Sakuryaku)		5:22
21.	"Stone Breathing, Third Form: Stone Skin" (岩の呼吸 参ノ型 岩軀の膚 - Iwa no kokyuu San no kata: Ganku no Hadae)		2:27
22.	"Pillars Gather: Invitation to the Infinity Castle" (柱結集～無限城への誘い - Hashira Kessyuu ~ Mugenjou Heno Sasoi)		5:46
Total length:			41:13
