= Demon Slayer: Kimetsu no Yaiba – The Hinokami Chronicles =

2021 video game

- Developer: CyberConnect2
- Publishers: JP: Aniplex; WW: Sega
- Director: Hisashi Natsumura
- Producer: Taichiro Miyazaki
- Programmers: Yasuhiko Tsuneoka; Kosuke Usami
- Composers: Yuki Kajiura; Go Shiina
- Series: Demon Slayer: Kimetsu no Yaiba
- Engine: Unreal Engine 4
- Platforms: PlayStation 4; PlayStation 5; Windows; Xbox One; Xbox Series X/S; Nintendo Switch
- Release: PlayStation 4, PlayStation 5, Windows, Xbox One, Xbox Series X/S: JP: October 14, 2021; WW: October 15, 2021; Nintendo Switch: JP: June 9, 2022; WW: June 10, 2022
- Genres: Fighting, action-adventure
- Modes: Single-player, multiplayer

Demon Slayer: Kimetsu no Yaiba – The Hinokami Chronicles (Note: Known in Japan as Kimetsu no Yaiba Hinokami Keppūtan (鬼滅の刃 ヒノカミ血風譚)) is a fighting action-adventure game developed by CyberConnect2. Based on the 2019 anime adaptation of Koyoharu Gotouge's manga series, Demon Slayer: Kimetsu no Yaiba, the game was released by Aniplex in Japan, and globally by Sega, for PlayStation 4, PlayStation 5, Windows, Xbox One, and Xbox Series X/S in October 2021. It was released for Nintendo Switch in June 2022.

A sequel, Demon Slayer: Kimetsu no Yaiba – The Hinokami Chronicles 2, was released in August 2025.

== Gameplay and plot ==
Adapted from the events of the first season of the anime series, along with Demon Slayer: Kimetsu no Yaiba the Movie: Mugen Train, the game's single player story mode follows Tanjiro Kamado, the series' protagonist, as he joins the Demon Slayer Corps and faces off against various demons in order to turn his sister Nezuko, who has become a demon, back into a human. The story features some exploration elements, and is told through various cutscenes and boss battles with demons seen in the anime series. The Hinokami Chronicles also features a versus mode, where players form teams of two fighters from the roster and battle CPU opponents or other people. The game supports both local and online multiplayer.

=== Characters ===
The game launched with 18 characters, including six who appeared in the spin-off anime Junior High and High School!!! Kimetsu Academy Story. These spin-off characters feature different outfits and ultimate attacks, but otherwise generally play the same as their main-story counterparts. Six characters were later added via free updates, along with seven made available as downloadable content, for a total of 31.

- Academy Giyu Tomioka
- Academy Inosuke Hashibira
- Academy Nezuko Kamado
- Academy Shinobu Kocho
- Academy Tanjiro Kamado
- Academy Zenitsu Agatsuma
- Akaza / Upper Rank 3 (Note: Added via post-launch update)
- Daki / Upper Rank 6 (Note: Downloadable content)
- Enmu / Lower Rank 1
- Giyu Tomioka
- Gyutaro / Upper Rank 6
- Hinokami Tanjiro Kamado
- Inosuke Hashibira
- Inosuke Hashibira (Entertainment District Arc)
- Kyojuro Rengoku
- Makomo
- Murata
- Nezuko Kamado
- Nezuko Kamado (Awakened Form)
- Rui / Lower Rank 5
- Sabito
- Sakonji Urokodaki
- Shinobu Kocho
- Susamaru
- Tanjiro Kamado
- Tanjiro Kamado (Entertainment District Arc)
- Tengen Uzui
- Yahaba
- Yushiro and Tamayo
- Zenitsu Agatsuma
- Zenitsu Agatsuma (Entertainment District Arc)

== Development ==
The game was announced in March 2020. It was to be published by Aniplex for the PlayStation 4; the company previously produced the 2019 anime adaptation. Later that month, first footage was shown, along with the announcement that the game, titled Kimetsu no Yaiba Hinokami Keppūtan in Japan, would be developed by CyberConnect2, the company known for developing the Naruto: Ultimate Ninja series. Following months of development, the game was re-announced via the issue of Weekly Shōnen Jump to be a multiplatform arena fighting game for the PlayStation 4, PlayStation 5, Windows, Xbox One, and Xbox Series X/S. Ufotable, the animation studio behind the anime series, has produced several key illustrations for the game.

The Hinokami Chronicles received three free post-launch DLC, each with two new characters. The first, announced in October 2021, and released in November 2021, added Akaza and Rui, the first playable antagonists in the game. An Additional Character Pack, released in 2022, added seven characters from the Entertainment District Arc as paid DLC, although the arc itself was not adapted into the game's story mode. A Nintendo Switch version was released in Japan on June 9, 2022, and worldwide the following day.

== Reception ==
Reception

Aggregate scores
Aggregator	Score
Metacritic	PS4: 70/100; PS5: 69/100; XSXS: 82/100; NS: 74/100
OpenCritic	47% recommend

Review scores
Publication	Score
Destructoid	6.5/10
Famitsu	33/40
IGN	7/10
Jeuxvideo.com	PS5: 13/20; NS: 14/20
Nintendo Life	8/10
Nintendo World Report	8.5/10
Push Square	6/10
Shacknews	7/10

Demon Slayer: Kimetsu no Yaiba – The Hinokami Chronicles received "mixed or average" reviews for most platforms, according to review aggregator Metacritic; the Xbox Series X/S version received "generally favorable" reviews. The PlayStation 4 version of Demon Slayer: Kimetsu no Yaiba – The Hinokami Chronicles was the bestselling retail game during its first week of release in Japan, with 94,849 physical copies being sold. The PlayStation 5 also version sold 20,187 copies during the same week, making it the second bestselling retail game in the country. By December 2021, the game had sold over 1.32 million copies worldwide. By March 2023, it had sold over 3 million copies worldwide. By February 2024, it had sold over 3.5 million copies worldwide. Sega later reported the game sold 4 million.

Demon Slayer: Kimetsu no Yaiba – The Hinokami Chronicles was nominated for Best Fighting Game at The Game Awards 2021.
