= Demon Slayer: Kimetsu no Yaiba season 1 =

First season of Demon Slayer: Kimetsu no Yaiba

Demon Slayer: Kimetsu no Yaiba
- Season 1
- Cover art for the first home media volume of the season, featuring protagonist Tanjiro Kamado
- No. of episodes: 26

Release
- Original network: Tokyo MX, GTV, GYT, BS11
- Original release: April 6 – September 28, 2019

Season chronology
- Next → Season 2

The first season of the Demon Slayer: Kimetsu no Yaiba anime television series is based on the manga series Demon Slayer: Kimetsu no Yaiba by Koyoharu Gotouge. An anime series adaptation produced by Ufotable was announced in Weekly Shōnen Jump on June 4, 2016. The first season, also known as Tanjiro Kamado, Unwavering Resolve Arc, (Note: Risshi-hen (立志編)) adapts the first seven volumes (chapters 1–54) of the manga and aired from April 6 to September 28, 2019, on Tokyo MX, GTV, GYT, BS11, and other networks. Haruo Sotozaki directed the anime with scripts by the Ufotable staff. Yuki Kajiura and Go Shiina composed the music, and Akira Matsushima is the character designer. Hikaru Kondo is the producer.

Demon Slayer: Kimetsu no Yaiba is set in a world during Japan's Taishō era, where humanity secretly lives and fights against the threat of demons: transformed humans who possess supernatural abilities such as enhanced strength, rapid regeneration, and unique powers referred to as "Blood Demon Arts". The story follows a teenager, Tanjiro Kamado, who strives to become a "Demon Slayer" after his family was slaughtered and his younger sister, Nezuko, is turned into a demon.

The opening theme is "Gurenge" (紅蓮華; "Red Lotus") by LiSA, while the ending theme is "from the edge" by FictionJunction feat. LiSA. The ending theme for episode 19 is "Kamado Tanjiro no Uta" (竈門炭治郎のうた; "Tanjiro Kamado's Song") by Go Shiina featuring Nami Nakagawa.

Aniplex of America licensed the series and streamed it on Crunchyroll, Hulu, and Funimation. AnimeLab simulcasted the series in Australia and New Zealand. The first season ran for 26 episodes.

Prior to airing, the first five episodes screened theatrically in Japan for two weeks from March 29, 2019, under the title Demon Slayer: Kimetsu no Yaiba – Sibling's Bond (鬼滅の刃 兄妹の絆, Kimetsu no Yaiba: Kyōdai no Kizuna). Aniplex of America screened the compilation film at the Aratani Theatre in Los Angeles on March 31, 2019. Madman Entertainment through AnimeLab screened the film in select theaters in Australia on April 2, 2019.

In July 2019, it was announced that the English dub would premiere on Adult Swim's Toonami programming block. It ran from October 13, 2019, to May 3, 2020. (Note: Adult Swim premiered the series on Saturday at 1:30 a.m. (25:30) ET/PT, which is effectively Sunday.)

== Episodes ==
Story	Episode	Title	Directed by	Storyboarded by	Original release date (Note: Kimetsu no Yaiba premiered in Tokyo MX's Saturday 23:30 (11:30 p.m. JST) time slot.)	English air date
1	1	"Cruelty"; Transliteration: "Zankoku" (Japanese: 残酷)	Haruo Sotozaki	Haruo Sotozaki	April 6, 2019	October 13, 2019
Tanjiro Kamado lives a quiet, peaceful life with his family in the snowy mountains of Japan, providing for them by selling charcoal at the nearby town. One day, he returns home and finds his entire family slaughtered in a demon attack, with the exception of his younger sister, Nezuko, who has been transformed into a demon herself. A Demon Slayer, Giyu Tomioka, appears to kill Nezuko, but Tanjiro attempts to defend her. Surprised to see Nezuko resist her demonic urges and impressed by Tanjiro's potential, he decides to spare her life, telling him to go find a man named Sakonji Urokodaki on Mt. Sagiri. Tanjiro and Nezuko bury their family before departing.
2	2	"Trainer Sakonji Urokodaki"; Transliteration: "Sodate Urokodaki Sakonji" (Japanese: 育手・鱗滝左近次)	Haruo Sotozaki	Haruo Sotozaki	April 13, 2019	October 20, 2019
Tanjiro and Nezuko make their way toward Mt. Sagiri when they encounter a demon residing in a nearby temple. They manage to restrain it, but Tanjiro finds himself hesitant to kill it, leaving it to burn in the sunlight. At this time, he meets Sakonji, who chastises him for his poor resolve and warns him of the dire consequences should Nezuko ever kill a human. After letting Nezuko rest, Sakonji puts Tanjiro through a test to prove his worthiness by climbing up and descending the hazardous and trap-infested Mt. Sagiri. Tanjiro succeeds in the task, and, after recalling the letter from Giyu requesting him to train Tanjiro to become a Demon Slayer, Sakonji accepts him as his student.
3	3	"Sabito and Makomo"; Transliteration: "Sabito to Makomo" (Japanese: 錆兎と真菰)	Shin'ya Shimomura	Haruo Sotozaki	April 20, 2019	October 27, 2019
To become a Demon Slayer, Tanjiro must survive an event called Final Selection. He undergoes a year of harsh physical training, while learning about the "Total Concentration" and "Water Breathing" techniques. With everything to know laid out, Sakonji gives Tanjiro an ultimate task to allow him to partake in Final Selection: slice an immense boulder. Six months pass without any progress when Tanjiro is confronted by a fellow swordsman, Sabito, who criticizes him for his weaknesses. Another swordsman, Makomo, helps to train Tanjiro; she reveals they both are former students of Sakonji. Six months of further training concludes with a final spar, where Tanjiro successfully strikes Sabito. As the two commend him for his success and vanish in a haze, it is revealed his slash has sliced the boulder in half.
4	4	"Final Selection"; Transliteration: "Saishū Senbetsu" (Japanese: 最終選別)	Shin'ya Shimomura	Toshiyuki Shirai	April 27, 2019	November 3, 2019
Sakonji is shocked by Tanjiro's achievement as he believed it was impossible, telling him to come back alive from Final Selection. He arrives alongside a group of others who also aspire to be Demon Slayers, and they learn from the overseers that they must survive for seven days amongst demons trapped in the mountains. During his battles, he encounters the "Hand Demon", a giant grotesque demon who he learns specifically targets and kills the students of Sakonji, including Sabito and Makomo. Despite the demon nearly overwhelming Tanjiro, he manages to overcome his defenses and successfully slices his neck with his Water Breathing.
5	5	"My Own Steel"; Transliteration: "Onore no Hagane" (Japanese: 己の鋼)	Takashi Suhara	Takashi Suhara	May 4, 2019	November 10, 2019
As the demon burns to ash, Tanjiro senses a scent of sadness from his remains and prays he will be reborn in a better life. With his death, the souls of his victims are put to rest. Tanjiro survives the seven days and finds only three other survivors. After receiving his starting rank and choosing the ore to make his sword, Tanjiro returns to Mt. Sagiri, where he reunites with Sakonji and a reawakened Nezuko. A swordsmith named Haganezuka arrives afterwards to give Tanjiro his sword, surprising everyone that it turns black. His Kasugai Crow appears to provide him with the details for his first mission, to investigate a village where young girls have been disappearing.
6	6	"Swordsman Accompanying a Demon"; Transliteration: "Oni wo Tsureta Kenshi" (Japanese: 鬼を連れた剣士)	Jun'ichi Minamino	Jun'ichi Minamino	May 11, 2019	November 17, 2019
Tanjiro travels to the village to investigate the disappearances, where he meets Kazumi, whose fiancée Satoko is the latest victim. Tanjiro waits until night arrives; a demon attempts to take his next victim, but Tanjiro intervenes and rescues her. He discovers that the "Swamp Demon" not only possesses two other clones of himself but also can create puddles allowing them to appear from anywhere. The demon also reveals all of his victims have already been devoured, including Satoko. Tanjiro struggles to protect Kazumi and the girl while simultaneously attempting to kill the Swamp Demon, forcing Nezuko to intervene.
7	7	"Muzan Kibutsuji"; Transliteration: "Kibutsuji Muzan" (Japanese: 鬼舞辻 無慘)	Takahiro Majima & Masashi Takeuchi	Masashi Takeuchi	May 18, 2019	November 24, 2019
While Nezuko protects Kazumi and the girl, Tanjiro jumps into the swamp to defeat two of the clones. Nezuko battles the last clone until Tanjiro corners it. He asks the demon about Muzan Kibutsuji, the original demon and the one capable of transforming people, but he refuses to speak, terrified by Muzan's previous threats. After killing the demon, Tanjiro consoles Kazumi over his loss before journeying to his next mission in Asakusa. In the city, Tanjiro detects a scent that was present in his house the day his family was killed. He follows it to a man with his wife and daughter, who turns out to be Muzan in disguise. While being confronted, Muzan turns a passerby into a demon in the crowd to make his escape.
8	8	"The Smell of Enchanting Blood"; Transliteration: "Genwaku no Chi no Kaori" (Japanese: 幻惑の血の香り)	Hideki Hosokawa	Haruo Sotozaki	May 25, 2019 (Note: Episode 8 premiered prior to television airing at Madman Anime Festival Brisbane, Australia at 1:00 pm AEST (12:00 pm JST).)	December 8, 2019
Muzan flees as Tanjiro struggles with the demon, but not before hearing his vow to kill him. Remembering a feared enemy from his past that wore the same earrings he saw on Tanjiro, Muzan tasks two demons, Susamaru and Yahaba, with killing him. Tanjiro is rescued by two demons, Tamayo and Yushiro, who both wish to see Muzan defeated. The siblings are brought to Tamayo's residence by Yushiro, where Tamayo reveals the possibility of creating a cure for Nezuko, though it will require blood from demons close to Muzan for her to do research. As Tanjiro resolves to accomplish his new goal, the four are attacked by a horde of temaris controlled by Susamaru and Yahaba.
9	9	"Temari Demon and Arrow Demon"; Transliteration: "Temari Oni to Yajirushi Oni" (Japanese: 手毬鬼と矢印鬼)	Shin'ya Shimomura	Haruo Sotozaki	June 1, 2019	December 15, 2019
Susamaru uses her temaris to destroy the house, revealing that she and Yahaba are members of the Twelve Kizuki, powerful demons that serve directly under Muzan. Tanjiro struggles to attack the temaris, as they swerve in physically impossible directions and are difficult to slash. Yushiro helps him see the arrows that Yahaba is using to control their path. While Tanjiro faces Yahaba, Nezuko and Yushiro battle Susamaru. Initially, Yahaba overpowers Tanjiro by disrupting his attacks, and Nezuko's leg is blown off by Susamaru's temari. However, Tanjiro recalls his training about Water Breathing and utilizes a combination of forms to use Yahaba's arrows in his favor and behead him.
10	10	"Together Forever"; Transliteration: "Zutto Issho ni Iru" (Japanese: ずっと一緒にいる)	Yūki Itō	Yoshiaki Kawajiri	June 8, 2019	January 5, 2020
Yahaba repeatedly attacks Tanjiro before he eventually dies. After being healed by Tamayo, Nezuko increases in strength and fights Susamaru. Using her Blood Demon Art, Tamayo tricks Susamaru into saying Muzan's name, triggering a curse that kills her. She realizes both were not of the Twelve Kizuki after examining her eyeball, as it does not have a number engraved on it. Tanjiro laments over Muzan's cruelty, lying to demons to use their desperation. Despite Sakonji's hypnosis to make her believe all humans must be protected, Nezuko's recognition of the demons as human causes Tamayo to cry out of thankfulness. While travelling to his next mission, Tanjiro finds a Demon Slayer harassing a woman into marrying him.
11	11	"Tsuzumi Mansion"; Transliteration: "Tsuzumi no Yashiki" (Japanese: 鼓の屋敷)	Shūji Miyahara	Toshiyuki Shirai	June 15, 2019	January 12, 2020
Tanjiro stops the Demon Slayer, Zenitsu Agatsuma, from disturbing the woman; he later joins him on his mission at a woodland mansion. They find two children, Shoichi and Teruko, who tell them their brother has been abducted. Leaving Nezuko's box outside, Tanjiro and Zenitsu enter the mansion when the children join them. They are then separated by the moving rooms; Tanjiro and Teruko find the demon controlling the mansion, while Zenitsu and Shoichi find another Demon Slayer wearing a boar mask. Tanjiro attempts to plan his attack on the demon when the masked Demon Slayer appears.
12	12	"The Boar Bares its Fangs, Zenitsu Sleeps"; Transliteration: "Inoshishi wa Kiba wo Muki, Zenitsu wa Nemuru" (Japanese: 猪は牙を剥き、善逸は眠る)	Susumu Takeuchi	Masashi Takeuchi	June 22, 2019	January 19, 2020
The rogue Demon Slayer argues with Tanjiro over killing the demon when they are attacked by invisible slashes from the demon's drumming. Separated into rooms again, Tanjiro finds Teruko's brother Kiyoshi. When Zenitsu and Shoichi are cornered by a demon, he loses consciousness out of fear, and whilst asleep, he uses his Thunder Breathing to kill it. The masked Demon Slayer also finds a demon but easily dispatches it. The Drum Demon, Kyogai, reveals his wish to reclaim his place amongst the Twelve Kizuki, previously stripped of his rank by Muzan. After directing the siblings to safety, Tanjiro battles Kyogai and adapts to his drums' movements.
13	13	"Something More Important Than Life"; Transliteration: "Inochi Yori Daiji-na Mono" (Japanese: 命より大事なもの)	Yūsuke Shibata	Haruo Sotozaki	June 29, 2019	January 26, 2020
Angered by Tanjiro's persistence, Kyogai attacks erratically, recalling painful memories from his human life of being mocked for his drumming. Despite his injuries, Tanjiro maintains his Water Breathing and beheads Kyogai. He hears Tanjiro acknowledge his Blood Demon Art and cries as he fades to ash, his drum playing finally recognized. Tanjiro takes Kyogai's blood with a vial and gives it to Tamayo's cat. Taking the siblings outside, he finds Zenitsu, who was thrown outside the mansion earlier, being kicked by the rogue Demon Slayer for protecting Nezuko. He reveals he had known all along Tanjiro had been carrying a demon but chose to believe he had a good reason. Tanjiro defends him and attacks the rogue Demon Slayer.
14	14	"The House with the Wisteria Family Crest"; Transliteration: "Fuji no Hana no Kamon no Ie" (Japanese: 藤の花の家紋の家)	Haruo Sotozaki & Shūji Miyahara	Haruo Sotozaki	July 6, 2019	February 2, 2020
Despite the taboo of Demon Slayers to harm one another, Tanjiro fights back and eventually head-butts the rogue Demon Slayer to make him stop, causing his mask to fall. When his face is revealed, he introduces himself as Inosuke Hashibira. Tanjiro's Kasugai Crow directs the three to descend the mountain. Bidding the siblings farewell, they travel to a house, where an elderly woman helps them rest and recover. Inosuke explains he only entered Final Selection to test his abilities on demons. Zenitsu asks Tanjiro for his reason in carrying a demon, just as Nezuko appears. Angered at Tanjiro for having a girl with him all along, Zenitsu chases him without allowing him time to explain.
15	15	"Mount Natagumo"; Transliteration: "Natagumo-yama" (Japanese: 那多蜘蛛山)	Yūki Itō & Shinsuke Gomi	Yūki Itō	July 13, 2019	February 9, 2020
After recovering, the trio are informed of their next mission on Mt. Natagumo. Inosuke and Tanjiro enter the mountain while a fearful Zenitsu stays behind. They find its forest covered in spider webs and meet another Demon Slayer, Murata, who reveals the Demon Slayers sent to the mountain began to spontaneously kill each other. They are attacked by the Demon Slayers but realize they are being puppeteered by the webs. A child-like demon confronts them, demanding they leave or be killed by his "Mother". Needing a plan, Inosuke uses his Beast Breathing to pinpoint the location of a distant demon. Meanwhile, the Demon Slayer Corps send two Hashiras, Giyu and Shinobu Kocho, to intervene.
16	16	"Letting Someone Else Go First"; Transliteration: "Jibun Dewanai Dareka wo Mae e" (Japanese: 自分ではない誰かを前へ)	Ken Takahashi	Haruo Sotozaki	July 20, 2019	February 16, 2020
Murata holds off the controlled Demon Slayers while Tanjiro and Inosuke venture further and find the remaining puppets, some of whom are still alive. Mother, who controls them, is threatened by her son, Rui, into killing them quicker. Tanjiro and Inosuke managed to stop the webs but Mother kills her puppets. They then face her strongest puppet, a large headless demon, which they kill by coordinating their attacks together. Inosuke throws Tanjiro into the air where he spots Mother and descends to kill her. Realizing she would be freed from the abuse she has been suffering, she surrenders, and Tanjiro opts to give her a painless death. Thankful of his actions, she warns Tanjiro that a member of the Twelve Kizuki is on the mountain.
17	17	"You Must Master a Single Thing"; Transliteration: "Hitotsu no Koto Kiwamenuke" (Japanese: 一つのこと極め抜け)	Shūji Miyahara & Takuya Nonaka	Haruo Sotozaki	July 27, 2019	February 23, 2020
While searching for Nezuko, Zenitsu finds captured Demon Slayers transforming into spiders. "Son" of the Spider Family emerges, revealing he has been bitten. Believing he will die, he reminisces on his past and reflects on how he repeatedly refused to train despite wanting to make his master proud. Zenitsu loses consciousness and attacks Son, who continually interrupts his form, the first and only form of Thunder Breathing he can do. Despite being poisoned, he beheads Son with his own variation of Thunder Breathing before attempting to slow the poison. Tanjiro and Inosuke encounter "Daughter" when she calls to her "Father", who emerges from the forest.
18	18	"A Forged Bond"; Transliteration: "Nisemono no Kizuna" (Japanese: 偽物の絆)	Akihiko Uda	Yoshiaki Kawajiri	August 3, 2019	March 1, 2020
Giyu and Shinobu arrive at Mt. Natagumo and split up. Tanjiro's and Inosuke's blades are unable to cut Father's skin; he eventually flings Tanjiro away, leaving Inosuke to face him alone. Zenitsu, near death, is found by Shinobu. After landing in the forest, Tanjiro sees Rui torturing Daughter over "family matters". He calls their familial bond fake, enraging Rui. Tanjiro battles him but is overwhelmed by his powerful threads. Rui, angered by his refusal to surrender, threatens to kill him slowly. Inosuke is quickly overpowered by Father and his swords break when he attempts to cut Father's neck. Giyu intervenes and kills Father, saving him. Tanjiro tries a frontal attack against Rui, resulting in his sword being sliced in half.
19	19	"Hinokami" (Japanese: ヒノカミ)	Toshiyuki Shirai	Toshiyuki Shirai	August 10, 2019	March 8, 2020
Impressed by Giyu, Inosuke challenges him but is denied. Shinobu gives Zenitsu an antidote, while the others are tended by Kakushi, trained assistants to the Demon Slayers. Tanjiro is overpowered by Rui and Nezuko is forced to intervene. Seeing their bond, Rui declares her his new sister, before revealing his rank as Lower Five. He takes Nezuko and restrains her. Using Water Breathing's last form, Tanjiro cuts through Rui's threads, but he strengthens new ones with blood and traps Tanjiro in a Blood Demon Art. Near death, he remembers how his father would perform a night-long ritualistic dance with a special breathing style. Using his father's Hinokami Kagura, he destroys Rui's attack and overwhelms him, while Nezuko uses her own Blood Demon Art, igniting her blood to burn his threads, allowing Tanjiro to behead him.
20	20	"Pretend Family"; Transliteration: "Yose Atsume no Kazoku" (Japanese: 寄せ集めの家族)	Takashi Suhara	Takashi Suhara	August 17, 2019	March 15, 2020
Despite their efforts, Tanjiro discovers Rui had beheaded himself, avoiding death. He attempts to kill him once more but is intercepted by Giyu, who destroys his Blood Demon Art and beheads him. Daughter flees the forest and remembers when she was found by Rui; he had already recruited others into his family, assigning them different roles, but they were tormented by his twisted view of a family. She finds Murata and traps him in an acidic cocoon. Shinobu appears and restrains her, pretending to befriend her but only after punishing Daughter for her murders. Unable to behead demons, she wields a special sword laced with wisteria-based poison. She kills Daughter and frees Murata. Seeing Tanjiro hugging Nezuko, Rui remembers his futile attempt to feel a familial bond.
21	21	"Against Corps Rules"; Transliteration: "Tairitsu Ihan" (Japanese: 隊律違反)	Takuya Nonaka	Takuya Nonaka & Toshiyuki Shirai	August 24, 2019	March 22, 2020
Born with a frail body, Rui was confined indoors, till Muzan met and transformed him one night. His parents discovered he devoured someone and tried to kill him. He kills them both but realized they only acted out of penance, haunting him. He crawls to Tanjiro, who comforts him after sensing his grief. Rui is reunited with his parents in Hell, who forgive him. Giyu scolds Tanjiro for showing Rui pity but he defends demons as tragic creatures. Giyu remembers the siblings and defends them from Shinobu. Tanjiro flees with Nezuko but a girl intercepts them, knocking him unconscious but failing to kill Nezuko. A Kasugai Crow announces that the siblings are to be taken to the Demon Slayers' headquarters, while Inosuke and Zenitsu are found by the Kakushi. Tanjiro soon finds himself in front of the Hashira.
22	22	"Master of the Mansion"; Transliteration: "Oyakata-sama" (Japanese: お館様)	Yūki Itō	Takashi Suhara	August 31, 2019	March 29, 2020
The Hashira, the strongest of the Demon Slayer Corps, believe Tanjiro and Nezuko should be executed alongside Giyu, who acted against orders. Tanjiro explains himself but they discredit him as bias. The Wind Hashira, Sanemi Shinazugawa, stabs Nezuko through her box, leading Tanjiro to attack him. Entering the trial, their leader, Kagaya Ubuyashiki, reveals he has sanctioned the siblings. When the Hashira disagree, he reveals a letter from Sakonji, who believes Nezuko is capable of resisting humans, adding that he, Giyu, and Tanjiro will kill themselves should it happen. Kagaya also reveals that Tanjiro has met Muzan. The Hashira realize his importance, but Sanemi aims to prove Nezuko can't be trusted, and attempts to entice Nezuko with his blood.
23	23	"Hashira Meeting"; Transliteration: "Chūgō Kaigi" (Japanese: 柱合会議)	Ken Takahashi	Takashi Suhara	September 7, 2019	April 5, 2020
In front of all, Nezuko resists Sanemi's taunts. Kagaya, seeing this as proof, officially acknowledges both as Demon Slayers. The siblings are taken by the Kakushi to Shinobu's estate, the Butterfly Mansion, to recover. Tanjiro meets Shinobu's protegeé, Kanao Tsuyuri, who he recognizes as the girl from Final Selection. He reunites with Zenitsu, Inosuke, and Murata, who are all in recovery. During a meeting, the Hashira reflect on the worsening damage caused by demons and the less skilled new Demon Slayers. Kagaya realizes that Rui's drastic actions are a diversion to hide Muzan's location, as he did in Asakusa. Despite the shortcomings, Kagaya reaffirms his faith in the Hashira. He vows that they will kill Muzan without fail.
24	24	"Rehabilitation Training"; Transliteration: "Kinō Kaifuku Kunren" (Japanese: 機能回復訓練)	Shūji Miyahara & Akihiko Uda	Akihiko Uda & Haruo Sotozaki	September 14, 2019 (Note: Episode 24 premiered prior to television airing at Madman Anime Festival Melbourne, Australia at 1:30 pm AEST (12:30 pm JST).)	April 19, 2020
After recovering, Tanjiro, Zenitsu, and Inosuke partake in Rehabilitation Training, involving three unusual challenges. Zenitsu and Inosuke soon quit when they cannot progress. The girls of the Butterfly Mansion; Sumi, Kiyo, and Naho, inform Tanjiro of a different technique called Total Concentration Constant. He undergoes his own training to learn it. When he meets Shinobu, she commends him for his spirit, and later reveals her reason to hate demons, as her elder sister was killed by one. Hearing her trust in him, Tanjiro remembers the pain of his family's death and his promise to Nezuko.
25	25	"Tsuguko, Kanao Tsuyuri"; Transliteration: "Tsuguko Kanao Tsuyuri" (Japanese: 継ぐ子 栗花落カナヲ)	Shin'ya Shimomura	Shin'ya Shimomura	September 21, 2019	April 26, 2020
Zenitsu and Inosuke see Tanjiro's progression and join him in training. Shinobu encourages Kanao to join them; she flips a coin and remembers her past. Born to an abusive family, she broke psychologically for showing emotion. She was found by Shinobu and her sister Kanae and adopted as a sister. Despite her inability to make decisions, Kanae refused to give up and gives her a coin to help her decide. Kanao walks away from the trio training after making her choice. Tanjiro and Inosuke receive new swords from Haganezuka and Kozo Kanamori respectively, though both are angered at their work being mistreated. Tanjiro soon succeeds in beating Kanao. Afterwards, he asks Shinobu about his Hinokami Kagura, who directs him towards the Flame Hashira Kyojuro Rengoku. Alone with Nezuko, Tanjiro reaffirms his goal to aid Tamayo's research and return his sister's humanity; she unexpectedly encourages him, giving him hope.
26	26	"New Mission"; Transliteration: "Aratanaru Nimmu" (Japanese: 新たなる任務)	Haruo Sotozaki & Yūichi Terao	Haruo Sotozaki & Yūichi Terao	September 28, 2019	May 3, 2020
After Rui's death, Muzan summons the remaining five Lower Ranks to an interdimensional castle. Angered by their weakness, he kills them all but spares Lower One Enmu, strengthening him with his blood; Muzan also incentivizes killing Tanjiro. The trio are assigned to join Kyojuro on a train to investigate its disappearances. He farewells the mansion's inhabitants, including Kanao, who after explaining her process of flipping a coin to make personal choices, Tanjiro convinces to instead listen to the voice of her heart and decide herself, leaving Kanao smitten by his kindness. The three arrive at the train station and jump onto the train as it leaves, which has Kyojuro and Enmu on board.

== Home media release ==
The series was released in Japan by Aniplex on eleven Blu-ray and DVD volumes beginning on July 31, 2019, and concluded on June 24, 2020. Each volume features cover art illustrated by the series' character designer, Akira Matsushima, and the limited-edition included a bonus original drama or soundtrack CD. Aniplex of America released the first limited-edition Blu-ray volume in North America on June 30, 2020, and the second volume was released on November 24, 2020. The company, in partnership with Funimation, released the standard-edition Blu-ray volumes in September 2020 and January 2021.

=== Japanese ===
Aniplex (Japan – Region 2/A)
Vol.	Episodes	Cover art	Bonus disc	Release date	Ref.
1	1–2	Tanjiro Kamado	Drama CD and Soundtrack	July 31, 2019	
2	3–5	Giyū Tomioka	Soundtrack	August 28, 2019	
3	6–7	Nezuko Kamado	Drama CD	September 25, 2019	
4	8–10	Tanjiro Kamado and Muzan Kibutsuji	Soundtrack	October 30, 2019	
5	11–12	Zenitsu Agatsuma	Drama CD	November 27, 2019	
6	13–14	Inosuke Hashibira	Soundtrack	December 25, 2019	
7	15–17	Tanjiro Kamado, Zenitsu Agatsuma and Inosuke Hashibira	Drama CD	January 29, 2020	
8	18–19	Tanjiro Kamado	Soundtrack	February 26, 2020	
9	20–21	Nezuko Kamado	Soundtrack	March 25, 2020	
10	22–24	Shinobu Kochō	Drama CD	May 27, 2020	
11	25–26	Tanjiro Kamado and Nezuko Kamado	Soundtrack	June 24, 2020	

=== English ===
Aniplex of America (North America – Region 1/A)
Vol.	Episodes	Release date	Ref.
1	1–13	June 30, 2020	
2	14–26	November 14, 2020	

Funimation (North America – Region 1/A)
Vol.	Episodes	Release date	Ref.
1	1–13	September 29, 2020	
2	14–26	January 19, 2021	
