= Nezuko Kamado =

Demon Slayer: Kimetsu no Yaiba character

- Demon Slayer: Kimetsu no Yaiba character
- Nezuko Kamado, as illustrated by Koyoharu Gotouge
- First appearance: Demon Slayer: Kimetsu no Yaiba chapter 1: "Cruelty", June 3, 2016
- Last appearance: Demon Slayer: Kimetsu no Yaiba one-shot: "Tanjiro's Status Report", February 4, 2021
- Created by: Koyoharu Gotouge
- Portrayed by: Karen Takahashi
- Voiced by: Japanese; Akari Kitō; English; Abby Trott

In-universe information
- Species: Human; Demon (formerly)
- Occupation: Housewife
- Affiliation: Demon Slayer Corps
- Fighting style: Blood Demon Art (pyrokinesis)
- Family: Tanjiro Kamado (brother)
- Spouse: Zenitsu Agatsuma (future husband)

Nezuko Kamado (Japanese: 竈門 禰豆子, Hepburn: Kamado Nezuko) is a fictional character in Koyoharu Gotouge's manga series Demon Slayer: Kimetsu no Yaiba. Nezuko and her older brother Tanjiro Kamado are the sole survivors of Muzan Kibutsuji's murder of their family, with Nezuko being transformed into a demon, but unexpectedly refusing to consume and harm humans. After an encounter with Giyu Tomioka, a demon slayer, Tanjiro begins his quest to help his sister turn back into a human and avenge the death of his family.

Nezuko's character was created to make Tanjiro's character more complex, as he is solely motivated to turn Nezuko back into a human. Nezuko received praise for her characterization as a demon and physical abilities. She has also been a popular character within the Demon Slayer: Kimetsu no Yaiba fanbase, appearing in an issue of the Weekly Playboy magazine.

== Creation and development ==
Early sketches of Nezuko and Tanjiro

Nezuko's character was created by manga artist Koyoharu Gotouge to make the main character, Tanjiro Kamado, more unique. Due to Nezuko being a demon, Tanjiro cannot bring himself to hate the demons he faces and instead finds himself in a gray zone of black and white morality. He says that demons also had a soul once and are not truly evil. The author's editor and other assistants said that, thanks to this, the manga took a more innovative narrative that easily engaged the readers.

Anime producer Yuma Takahashi said that although Nezuko is silent ever since the first episode, the staff could express intricate changes in the character's facial expression and humanize her emotions. Through those advantages, they were able to give more depth to her. Takahashi claimed that he wanted viewers to look forward to the development of Nezuko and the wide range of emotions she could show. The anime uses an insert theme song titled "Kamado Tanjiro no Uta". It expresses the determination of Tanjiro, who stands up from despair and struggles to protect his younger sister.

Although Nezuko is a demon for the majority of the series, she is depicted as looking and behaving attractively and attempting to behave as a human. She is altruistic and kind, but her life changes when she becomes a demon. In Demon Slayer: Kimetsu no Yaiba, demons need to eat humans to survive, but Nezuko believes that she should spare human lives. She wears a bamboo muzzle and communicates nonverbally, acting like a younger child due to amnesia common to most demons. She can harm demons and spare humans by having her blood become fire when it leaves her body.

=== Voice actresses ===
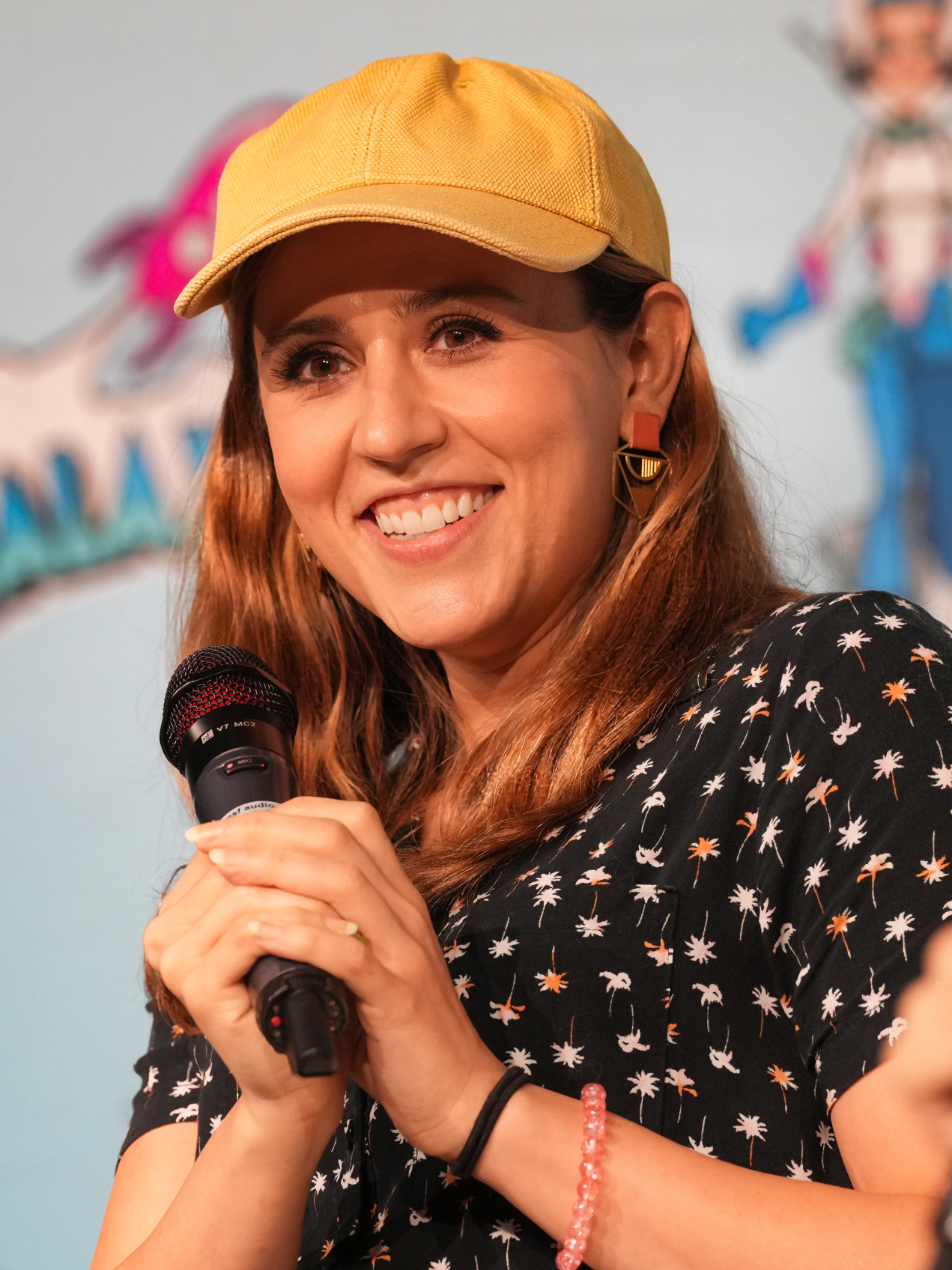
Abby Trott voices Nezuko in the English dub of Demon Slayer: Kimetsu no Yaiba anime adaptation.

Akari Kitō, the Japanese voice actress of Nezuko, said Tanjiro's voice actor, Natsuki Hanae, is similar to a big brother to her at the studio as he is supportive, and if there are parts that she has difficulty recording, Hanae would stay and wait until she finishes even though he has done his part. Hanae said he also thinks of Kitō as a younger sister. For the English dub, Abby Trott described Nezuko as "a sweet, caring sister to her many siblings," including when she becomes a demon, as she often aids her brother in battles. This kindness displayed by Nezuko was found relatable by Trott.

== Appearances ==
=== In Demon Slayer: Kimetsu no Yaiba ===
Nezuko is born to Tanjuro Kamado and Kie Kamado up on a mountain alongside her older brother, Tanjiro, and the rest of her siblings and as the eldest daughter of the Kamado family. Unlike Tanjiro, who was responsible for selling charcoal in town, Nezuko would usually help out around the family home.

Nezuko is turned into a demon by Muzan Kibutsuji during his murder of the Kamado family. She attempts to attack Tanjiro upon his return, but comes to her senses to defend him from Giyu Tomioka. Surprised by her behavior, Giyu sends her to the care of Sakonji Urokodaki, where she falls unconscious for two years while Tanjiro trains to become a Demon slayer.

After receiving assistance from Tamayo and helping her with her research, Nezuko assists Tanjiro in slaying demons during his nighttime missions, surprising and infuriating various demons due to her refusal to consume human flesh. She becomes traveling partners with Demon Slayers Zenitsu Agatsuma and Inosuke Hashibira. Her presence led to prosecution by Shinobu Kocho, but she is granted clemency on the condition she does not consume human flesh, being sent to the Butterfly Mansion for shelter.

Nezuko proves to be a great help to the Slayers, developing the Blood Demon Art Combustible Blood, which burns Demons but does not harm humans; she uses it on the ropes holding the Demon Slayers after they were put to sleep by Lower Rank Enmu on the Mugen Train, contributing to Enmu's defeat.

Nezuko awakens to her berserk-like Demon Transformation ability during the fight with Daki at the Entertainment District. Being unmuzzled and having spent the fight disconnected from her own humanity for a prolonged period of time, Nezuko stumbles upon and attempts to consume a human, but she is subdued by Tanjiro and is sidelined for the rest of the fight. She proves instrumental in saving several Demon Slayers from the brink of death by using her Exploding Blood ability to burn the lethal poison of Gyutaro out of the Slayers' blood. At Swordsmith Village, Nezuko befriends Mitsuri Kanroji and fights Hantengu with her brother. Before Hantengu's death, she is exposed to sunlight to Tanjiro's horror, but develops an immunity to sunlight which infuriates Muzan.

Nezuko returns to Sakonji's residence, where she is administered a drug produced by Tamayo and Shinobu to be turned into a human, falling unconscious in the process. After Tanjiro defeats Muzan on the surface after dawn, she rushes to his location, finally becoming a human and regaining her memories.

To Nezuko's horror, Tanjiro was turned into a demon by Muzan, leading to her subduing him the same way she was two years ago; ironically, Tanjiro also refuses to harm Nezuko while going feral, before the combined efforts of his allies turning him back into a human. After the Demon Slayers disband, Nezuko returns to her old life caring for Tanjiro and his friends at their residence, having received an absurdly large pension from the Ubuyashiki family. She also runs errands for her family, being the sole member who was not physically disabled after the fight against Muzan. She later marries Zenitsu, some time after he comically fails to propose marriage by yelling too loudly and rendering her temporarily deaf.

=== Other appearances ===
In a spin-off of Demon Slayer: Kimetsu no Yaiba, Junior High and High School!! Kimetsu Academy Story, Nezuko is transported to an alternative timeline and attends school as a student. Nezuko also appears in the video game Demon Slayer: Kimetsu no Yaiba – The Hinokami Chronicles. In the stage play Demon Slayer: The Stage, Karen Takahashi portrays Nezuko.

== Reception ==
=== Popularity ===
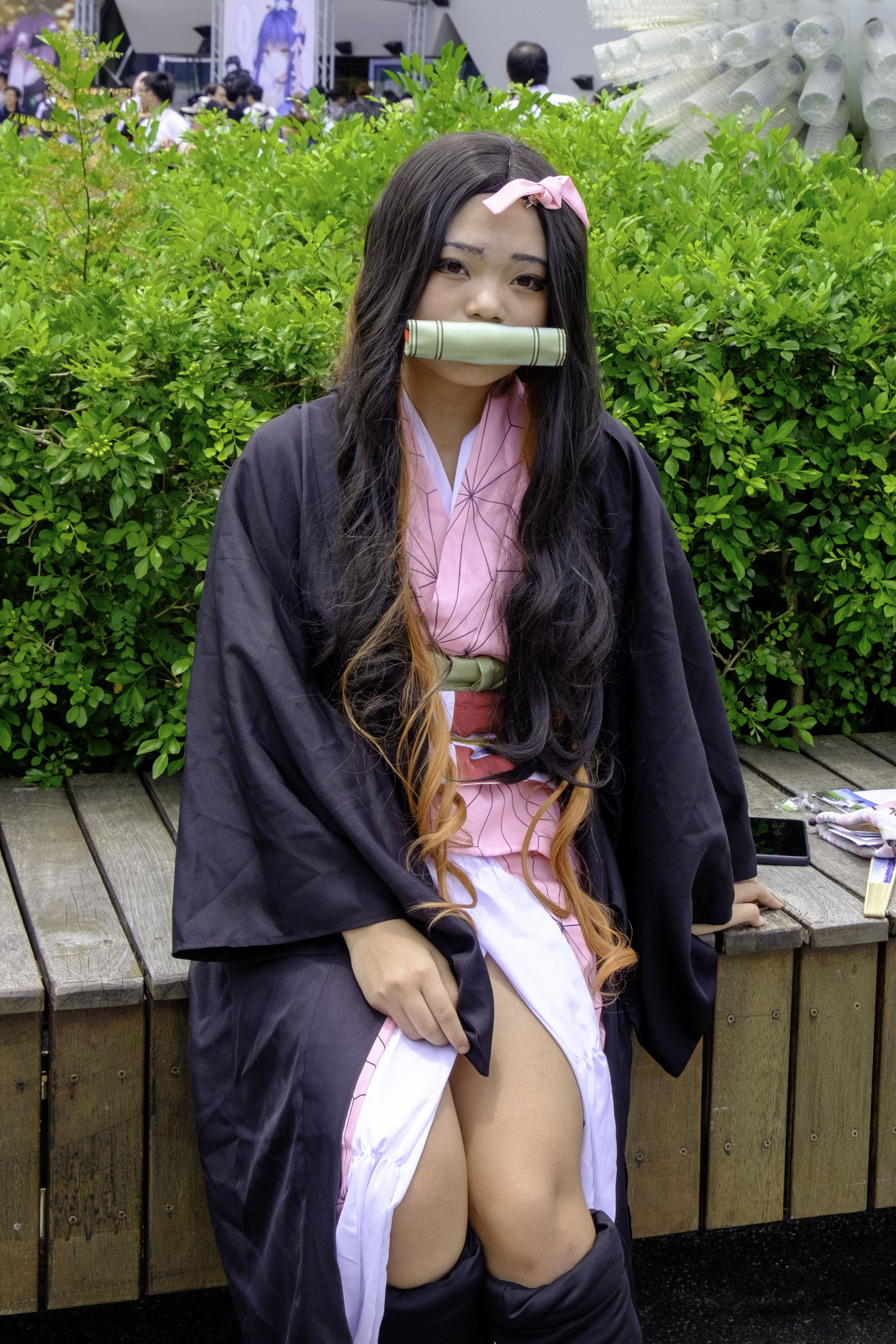
Nezuko Kamado has been a popular character among cosplayers.

Nezuko has been a popular character. She was ranked in third place in the first Demon Slayer: Kimetsu no Yaiba character popularity poll with 3,319 votes. She won the Newtype Anime Award for "Best Female Character" for her role in the series, along with Akari Kitō also being awarded "Best Voice Actress" for her performance as Nezuko. In February 2020 at the 4th Crunchyroll Anime Awards, Nezuko's fight with Tanjiro against Rui won the "Best Fight Scene" category while she was nominated for "Best Girl". At the 8th Crunchyroll Anime Awards in 2024, Abby Trott was nominated in the "Best Voice Artist Performance (English)" category for her performance as Nezuko, but lost to Ryan Colt Levy's Denji.

Nezuko was one of the five recipients for the "Best Girls of the Decade" in Funimation's Decade of Anime fan poll. IGN regarded Nezuko as one of the series' most popular characters and noted how her design elaborates the way she sees humans as good people as a result of hypnosis. Siliconera made a similar article discussing her characterization and how compelling she is during the anime's first season due to how, despite her tragic backstory, Nezuko becomes a more heroic figure when fighting other demons. In 2021, Nezuko appeared on the cover of the July issue of Weekly Playboy, featuring an interview with Kitō. In October 2021, Shueisha failed its appeal to trademark the clothing patterns for three of Demon Slayer: Kimetsu no Yaiba's main characters, including Nezuko.

As a result, the internet has exploded with various cosplayers dressing up as Nezuko on TikTok and Instagram. Many websites have also started creating content on how to do a Nezuko cosplay. Graphic designers and illustrators have taken to Pinterest with their own fan art and interpretations of Nezuko. One cosplayer in China was expelled from an anime event for wearing a kimono, even though she had intended to dress as Nezuko.

Much Demon Slayer: Kimetsu no Yaiba merchandise features Nezuko, including glasses frames, loungewear, canned coffee, model figures, and Tamagotchis. From October 6 to 9, 2022, Good Smile Company released Nendoroid Pins of Nezuko exclusive to the New York Comic Con.

=== Critical response ===
Response to Nezuko has generally been positive. Rebecca Silverman from Anime News Network noted that Nezuko retained her humanity despite becoming a demon due to how she protects her older brother, making Giyu allow the siblings to embark on a quest to find a cure to her state. James Beckett from the same site said that Nezuko's transformation into a demon was the pilot's strongest part, making the narrative surprisingly unconventional, based on Tanjiro's reaction to it and Giyu's actions. Steph Donaldson of Manga.Tokyo also praised the development of Nezuko's actions because she manages to awaken after two years as a caring demon to Tanjiro, making their embrace emotional. Comic Book Bin enjoyed Nezuko's portrayal because, although being a cursed character, she is still active and appealing to see, mostly due to how she develops supernatural strength to use in combat. In a general overview of the series's first episodes, UK Anime News found Nezuko as the most compelling character for the depth she possesses and, like Comic Book Bin, noted she is surprisingly helpful to Tanjiro when it comes to fighting. The 19th episode of the first season, "Hinokami", was cited by critics at IGN as one of television's best episodes in history, commenting on the build-up and exciting execution. Manga.Tokyo enjoyed the build-up of this scene as Nezuko managed to assist Tanjiro thanks to being motivated by her late mother, and the power she showed surprised the writer. Due to the emotional delivery of this scene, the writer looked forward to more interactions between the two siblings.

A writer for UK Anime News also enjoyed how the two siblings are compared to the villains in a meaningful way. A writer for Anime Inferno said, "Tanjiro and Nezuko make a great team and are two enjoyable protagonists, with the series at its best when the two siblings are working together." In Jungian Dimensions of the Mourning Process, Burial Rituals and Access to the Land of the Dead: Intimations of Immortality, the writer Hiroko Sakata addressed similarities between the Kamado siblings with the Forgotten God Hiruko, the Oni Katako, and the child K, citing the Kamados' stories as modernized versions of Japanese myths, comparing them with Yuta Okkotsu and Rika Orimoto from the manga Jujutsu Kaisen 0, as both aim to control the Oni element present in the narrative and become fighters in the process.

James Beckett of Anime News Network was surprised by Nezuko's heroic actions in the episode as well as the voice acting from Akari Kitō, despite not having multiple lines in the series, being able to develop her character in the process. The character's handling in the Entertainment District Arc was panned by James Beckett of Anime News Network, who thought there was objectification despite her character growth and portrayal. Laveena Joshi of FandomWire criticized Nezuko's portrayal in Demon Slayer by saying that her character development failed to impress readers and that she was "reduced to the status of a mascot".

=== Analysis ===
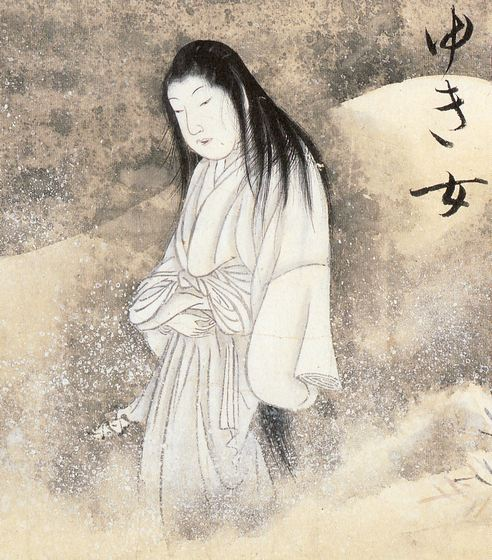
Nezuko Kamado has been compared to the Yuki-onna, a figure in Japanese fiction.

Ronald S. Green, the Chair of Philosophy and Religious Studies at Coastal Carolina University, stated that in Demon Slayer: Kimetsu no Yaiba – The Movie: Mugen Train, Nezuko is a reference to Yuki-onna, a figure that commonly appears in Japanese fiction. As Yuki-onna, a demon, would rescue the woodcutter in her narrative, Nezuko would rescue Tanjiro. According to Green, this shows their deep connection, Nezuko's humanity, and the internal conflict Nezuko must face between demonic nature and wanting to defend Tanjiro. Green also wrote that the bamboo muzzle could signify past cultural norms of silencing women. He compared her to characters from authors such as Fumiko Enchi and Yōko Ogawa. Megu Itoh of Rikkyo University and Fielding Montgomery and Taylor Hourigan of the University of Maryland wrote that in the film, an unconscious Tanjiro would undergo a dream sequence where all of the Kamado family members are still alive, but Nezuko would hit her forehead against him and bleed. The odor of her blood would cause him to become conscious again and reject these fantasies about their family. Itoh, Montgomery, and Hourigan said this prioritizes connectedness with the world instead of neoliberalist pleasure on a particular thought.
