= Demon Slayer: Kimetsu no Yaiba season 2 =

Second season of Demon Slayer: Kimetsu no Yaiba

Demon Slayer: Kimetsu no Yaiba
- Season 2
- Cover art for each of the first home media volumes of Mugen Train Arc (left) and Entertainment District Arc (right), respectively featuring Flame Hashira Kyojuro Rengoku and Sound Hashira Tengen Uzui
- No. of episodes: 18

Release
- Original network: Fuji Television
- Original release: October 10, 2021 – February 13, 2022

Season chronology
- ← Previous; Season 1 Next → Season 3

The second season of the Demon Slayer: Kimetsu no Yaiba anime television series is based on the manga series Demon Slayer: Kimetsu no Yaiba by Koyoharu Gotouge. The second season adapts from the 7th volume to the 11th volume (chapters 54–97) of the manga and ran for two continuous cours. The first part, titled Demon Slayer: Kimetsu no Yaiba – Mugen Train Arc, (Note: Mugen Ressha-hen (無限列車編)) is a seven-episode recompilation of the "Mugen Train" arc as featured in the 2020 anime film. It contains new music and an all new anime original episode which takes place immediately before the main story. The first part aired from October 10 to November 28, 2021. The second part, titled Demon Slayer: Kimetsu no Yaiba – Entertainment District Arc, (Note: Yūkaku-hen (遊郭編)) aired eleven episodes from December 5, 2021, to February 13, 2022. The season was directed by Haruo Sotozaki, with character designs by Akira Matsushima, and animation produced by Ufotable; staff and cast from the first season and Demon Slayer: Kimetsu no Yaiba – The Movie: Mugen Train also returned.

"Mugen Train" follows Tanjiro and his allies as they join Flame Hashira Kyojuro Rengoku on a mission inside a passenger train to face a hidden demon and rescue the passengers. "Entertainment District" takes place after the previous mission, where they assist Sound Hashira Tengen Uzui to investigate the disappearances of Tengen's wives while gathering information about a demon who terrorizes the red-light districts of Yoshiwara.

For the Mugen Train Arc, the opening theme is "Akeboshi" (明け星; lit. 'Morning Star') while the ending theme is "Shirogane" (白銀; lit. 'Silver'), both performed by LiSA. As is originally the case in the Mugen Train film, "Homura" (炎; Flame), the main theme song for the film, is used as the ending theme for episode 7. For the Entertainment District Arc, the opening theme is "Zankyōsanka" (残響散歌; lit. 'Song of Reverberation') while the ending theme is "Asa ga Kuru" (朝が来る; lit. 'Daybreak'), both performed by Aimer.

Aniplex of America licensed the season outside of Asia. Muse Communication licensed the second season in Asia-Pacific.

In October 2023, it was announced that the English dub of Mugen Train Arc would broadcast on Adult Swim's Toonami programming block which aired from November 12 to December 17 of the same year. A month later, it was confirmed that Entertainment District Arc would also air which broadcast from January 14 to March 24, 2024.

== Episodes ==
Story	Episode	Title	Directed by	Storyboarded by	Original release date	English air date	Viewership rating
Mugen Train Arc
27	1	"Flame Hashira Kyojuro Rengoku"; Transliteration: "En Bashira Rengoku Kyōjurō" (Japanese: 炎柱・煉󠄁獄杏寿郎)	Shin'ya Shimomura	Takashi Suhara	October 10, 2021	November 12, 2023	10.0%
Flame Hashira Kyojuro Rengoku is tasked with finding an elusive demon plaguing a town, believing it may also be connected to numerous disappearances on the Mugen Train. He meets a pair of bento vendors and advises them on the risk of demons, before he soon locates the Mugen Train. After learning it is slated to be put back into service, he encounters the demon responsible for the attacks throughout the area. To spite him for his humanity, the demon decides to hunt down the bento vendors. Kyojuro tracks it down and kills it, saving the vendors; his actions remind the elderly vendor of when she herself was saved by the former Flame Hashira years ago. After realizing the demon is too weak for such numerous victims, Kyojuro boards the train to begin his investigation.
28	2	"Deep Sleep"; Transliteration: "Fukai Nemuri" (Japanese: 深い眠り)	Toshiyuki Shirai	Takahiro Miura	October 17, 2021	November 12, 2023	8.0%
Tanjiro, Zenitsu, and Inosuke meet Kyojuro on the train. After an explanation of the situation by the Hashira, they discover two demons hidden on board and witness Kyojuro's impressive abilities first hand. Into the night, all four Demon Slayers fall asleep, with Tanjiro dreaming about being reunited with his lost family. In actuality, they have fallen into the Blood Demon Art of Lower Rank One Enmu; the demon had mixed his blood into the ink of their tickets, allowing his plan to go into motion without being noticed. As Tanjiro falls deeper into his slumber, Enmu finds joy that they may never awaken again.
29	3	"Should Have Been"; Transliteration: "Hontō nara" (Japanese: 本当なら)	Masashi Takeuchi	Takahiro Miura	October 24, 2021	November 19, 2023	7.0%
Whilst the Demon Slayers are asleep, Enmu instructs four recruited passengers to tie their wrists to theirs, fall asleep, and enter their dreams. Armed with an awl made of his bone, they must search for their spiritual core and destroy it to incapacitate them. Kyojuro's intruder finds his core, but his intensely strong spirit manages to stop her in the real world. Nezuko, who is unaffected by Enmu's Blood Demon Art, emerges from her box and tries to wake up Tanjiro. She alerts him that he is inside a dream, forcing Tanjiro to abandon his family to continue the mission. In an ultimate attempt to wake himself up, he slashes his own neck in order to regain consciousness.
30	4	"Insult"; Transliteration: "Bujoku" (Japanese: 侮辱)	Masashi Takeuchi	Takahiro Miura	November 7, 2021	November 26, 2023	6.4%
Tanjiro's intruder enters his subconsciousness, but finds himself unwilling to destroy his spiritual core. Tanjiro awakens to find his peers asleep. Nezuko burns the ropes on their wrists, which awakens the intruders. They attack Tanjiro, who knocks them out; he spares his intruder after learning how sick and desperate he was. When Zenitsu and Inosuke fail to awaken, Tanjiro climbs onto the roof to confront Enmu. Despite the demon repeatedly forcing him into unconsciousness, Tanjiro overcomes this by knowing to commit suicide to wake up, and eventually beheads him. However, Enmu does not die and reveals that he has fused with the entire train. Inosuke then awakens and assists Tanjiro in battling the demon.
31	5	"Move Forward!"; Transliteration: "Mae e!" (Japanese: 前へ！)	Toshiyuki Shirai	Takahiro Miura	November 14, 2021	December 3, 2023	5.7%
Inosuke and Tanjiro fight Enmu from inside the train but find their attacks futile. Nezuko joins the fight but is nearly overwhelmed until Zenitsu's intervention. Kyojuro damages Enmu enough to stall his assault and explains his plan to Tanjiro; he himself, Zenitsu, and Nezuko will protect the passengers while he and Inosuke will search for Enmu's neck. They locate it at the train's locomotive, but Enmu continues to generate flesh as protection. The driver, wanting to protect him, stabs Tanjiro in the stomach. However, he perseveres, and, coordinating with Inosuke, successfully exposes Enmu's neck. Using his Hinokami Kagura, Tanjiro beheads Enmu, causing the train to derail and crashes into the ground.
32	6	"Akaza" (Japanese: 猗窩座)	Hideki Hosokawa	Haruo Sotozaki	November 21, 2021	December 10, 2023	6.6%
After the train derails, Enmu disintegrates. Tanjiro struggles with his wound but manages to stabilize it under Kyojuro's guidance. They are then confronted by Upper Rank Three Akaza, who tries to persuade Kyojuro into turning into a demon, having sensed how powerful he was. Appealing to his integrity as the Flame Hashira, he vehemently refuses, causing Akaza to attack him. He orders Tanjiro and Inosuke to stay behind. Despite Kyojuro's tremendous strength and speed, Akaza overwhelms him with his shockwave-based Blood Demon Art and powerful regeneration, injuring him severely as Tanjiro and Inosuke do nothing but look from afar helplessly.
33	7	"Set Your Heart Ablaze"; Transliteration: "Kokoro o Moyase" (Japanese: 心を燃やせ)	Haruo Sotozaki	Haruo Sotozaki	November 28, 2021	December 17, 2023	6.5%
Making a last stand, Kyojuro unleashes one final attack on Akaza, but the demon mortally wounds him and flees upon the arrival of daybreak. A desperate Tanjiro hurls his sword at Akaza, who nonetheless escapes as he angrily denounces him as a coward for fleeing. As Kyojuro succumbs to his injuries, he confides in Tanjiro messages for both his brother and father for him to give them. He accepts Nezuko as a member of the Demon Slayer Corps and encourages Tanjiro to "set his heart ablaze". He sees a vision of his proud mother before dying peacefully. The Hashira receive the news of Kyojuro's death, while Corps leader Kagaya Ubuyashiki appreciates him for not letting anyone else die in his presence.
Entertainment District Arc
34	8 (1) (Note: Season no. (Story arc no.))	"Sound Hashira Tengen Uzui"; Transliteration: "On Bashira Uzui Tengen" (Japanese: 音柱・宇髄天元)	Shin'ya Shimomura & Kei Tsunematsu	Takashi Suhara	December 5, 2021 (Note: Episode 34 is a 46 minute special.)	January 14, 2024	9.2%
Akaza meets with Muzan Kibutsuji, who expresses disappointment in him for not being able to kill the other three Demon Slayers other than Kyojuro. Tanjiro goes to meet Kyojuro's brother Senjuro and his father Shinjuro. Shinjuro, the former Flame Hashira but now an alcoholic who detests the Demon Slayers and sees his sons as failures, dismisses Tanjiro violently. However, when he sees Tanjiro's earrings, he explains to him he is a bearer of the first breathing technique, called "Sun Breathing". Tanjiro accosts him for disrespecting Kyojuro, leading to a fight. Later, Senjuro thanks Tanjiro for passing him his brother's messages, and gifts Tanjiro the tsuba from Kyojuro's sword. Four months after Kyojuro's death, Tanjiro, Zenitsu, and Inosuke accompany Sound Hashira Tengen Uzui to their next mission – investigating the famed Yoshiwara red-light district.
35	9 (2)	"Infiltrating the Entertainment District"; Transliteration: "Yūkaku Sennyū" (Japanese: 遊郭潜入)	Takashi Suhara	Takashi Suhara	December 12, 2021	January 21, 2024	8.7%
In order to investigate the suspected demonic presence in Yoshiwara, Tengen had sent his three wives to infiltrate the three largest courtesan Houses in the district. However, they stopped contacting him, causing him to worry. Tengen disguises Tanjiro, Inosuke, and Zenitsu as girls and sells them to the three Houses in which his wives were deployed to find clues to their fate. Despite initial difficulty, all three are accepted to work at the Houses. As Tengen surveys the district from the rooftops, it is revealed that Makio, one of Tengen's wives, is held captive in a secluded room in Inosuke's House, being restrained by numerous obi and enduring interrogation from a mysterious female voice.
36	10 (3)	"What Are You?"; Transliteration: "Nanimono?" (Japanese: 何者？)	Akihiko Uda	Takashi Suhara	December 19, 2021	January 28, 2024	8.5%
Inosuke investigates Makio's room and discovers something moving through the ceiling and walls, though it evades him. Zenitsu defends a girl from being scolded by Warabihime, the House's oiran. He recognizes her as a demon but is attacked and knocked unconscious. Days before the mission had begun, the madam of the House confronts Warabihime, having determined her true identity, but Warabihime drops her onto the street to her death. She is then greeted by Muzan, who praises her and addresses the demon by her true name Daki: the Upper Rank Six. Later, Zenitsu wakes up and is tended to by the girls he had defended. After they leave, he is captured by Daki.
37	11 (4)	"Tonight"; Transliteration: "Kon'ya" (Japanese: 今夜)	Hideki Hosokawa	Takuya Nonaka & Haruo Sotozaki	December 26, 2021	February 4, 2024	7.4%
Realizing Zenitsu is missing, Tengen dismisses Tanjiro and Inosuke, not wanting them to risk their lives for the mission. The two refuse to abandon him and prepare themselves. Tengen interrogates the master of Zenitsu's House, who tells him about Warabihime. Tanjiro detects a demonic scent coming from his House and sees Daki absorbing the House's oiran into her obi. The two fight but she overwhelms Tanjiro with her numerous obi sashes; one of the straps on Nezuko's box breaks, forcing Tanjiro to leave her behind as he confronts Daki, readying himself to face the strongest demon he will have fought thus far.
38	12 (5)	"Things Are Gonna Get Real Flashy!!"; Transliteration: "Dohade ni Iku ze!!" (Japanese: ド派手に行くぜ‼)	Takuya Nonaka	Takuya Nonaka & Haruo Sotozaki	January 2, 2022	February 11, 2024	7.7%
Tengen finds Hinatsuru on the outskirts of the district, having poisoned herself to escape but remaining unable to contact him. Tanjiro tries to use Hinokami Kagura but realizes the fatigue on his body is preventing him from fighting effectively. Inosuke discovers a tunnel under his House, leading to a cavern that serves as a holding cell for Daki's victims. The obi inside it is able to function independently from Daki's body; Inosuke first attempts to slay it but decides to prioritize freeing the people trapped inside. He manages to free Tengen's wives Suma and Makio, as well as Zenitsu, all of whom assist him in his fight, before being joined by Tengen.
39	13 (6)	"Layered Memories"; Transliteration: "Kasanaru Kioku" (Japanese: 重なる記憶)	Jun'ichi Minamino	Takahiro Miura	January 9, 2022	February 18, 2024	7.5%
During their battle, Daki's attacks lead to numerous casualties. Tanjiro angrily retaliates, using Hinokami Kagura to enhance his speed and power. She sees memories of a similar figure to Tanjiro, which she surmises belong to Muzan's cells in her body. Tanjiro pushes Daki on the defensive and nearly beheads her when he suddenly collapses; he had been fighting without sustaining his breathing and a vision from his late sister only saves him from suffocation. Daki prepares to kill Tanjiro when Nezuko intervenes. Remembering Muzan's mention of a rogue demon, Daki attacks Nezuko, but is shocked to see her healing instantly. Nezuko then matures in appearance to face her.
40	14 (7)	"Transformation"; Transliteration: "Henbō" (Japanese: 変貌)	Seiji Harada	Takahiro Miura	January 16, 2022	February 25, 2024	8.3%
Nezuko's increasingly powerful regeneration and Blood Demon Art overwhelms Daki, but she accidentally injures a bystander and her demonic bloodlust overwhelms her senses; she almost attacks them before Tanjiro intervenes. Tengen arrives and beheads Daki, doubtful she is an Upper Rank. However, she does not die, and instead, her brother Gyutaro emerges from within her body. Gyutaro, the true Upper Six, heals Daki and battles Tengen with his sickles and Blood Demon Art. Tengen is injured and struggles to defend himself, realizing that Daki cannot die whilst Gyutaro is alive. Tanjiro calms Nezuko down, just as Zenitsu and Inosuke arrive.
41	15 (8)	"Gathering"; Transliteration: "Shūketsu" (Japanese: 集結)	Ken Takahashi	Ken Takahashi	January 23, 2022	March 3, 2024	7.5%
Taking Nezuko to safety, Tanjiro focuses on the battle despite his injuries. Tengen separates Daki from Gyutaro and is joined by the trio. Yoshiwara is evacuated by Suma and Makio, while Hinatsuru makes her way to Tengen. The Demon Slayers plan to behead the demons simultaneously but Daki engages Zenitsu and Inosuke, while Gyutaro fights Tengen and Tanjiro. Fighting as one, the demons gradually overwhelm their opponents, but Tanjiro, realizing his Water Breathing is more useful defensively, is able to fend off Gyutaro's attacks. Hinatsuru appears and fires wisteria-laced kunais at Gyutaro, paralyzing him and allowing Tengen and Tanjiro to reach his neck.
42	16 (9)	"Defeating an Upper Rank Demon"; Transliteration: "Jōgen no Oni o Taoshitara" (Japanese: 上弦の鬼を倒したら)	Jun'ichi Minamino	Haruo Sotozaki	January 30, 2022	March 10, 2024	8.2%
Gyutaro neutralizes the wisteria and fends off Tengen and Tanjiro, before grabbing Hinatsuru. Tanjiro combines his Hinokami Kagura and Water Breathing in a charge that stuns Gyutaro and saves her. Tengen joins him to slashing Gyutaro's neck, but he stops their blades and unleashes his Blood Demon Art, forcing Tengen to throw him and himself away. As Tengen fights Gyutaro, Tanjiro joins Zenitsu and Inosuke against Daki; he and Zenitsu open Inosuke's path, allowing him to behead her. He runs away with her head when Gyutaro stabs him from behind. Tanjiro looks for Tengen and sees him wounded and motionless. Devastated for not being able to help him, he freezes; Zenitsu pushes him off the roof away from Daki's obi.
43	17 (10)	"Never Give Up"; Transliteration: "Zettai Akiramenai" (Japanese: 絶対諦めない)	Toshiyuki Shirai	Toshiyuki Shirai	February 6, 2022	March 17, 2024	8.5%
Tanjiro survives his fall but is confronted by Gyutaro, mocking his inability to protect anyone. He offers to transform him but Tanjiro responds by head-butting him, secretly stabbing him with a laced kunai and attempting to behead him once more. Daki intervenes but is attacked by Zenitsu with his fastest form. Gyutaro removes the kunai and recovers. Before he can kill Tanjiro, Tengen, who halted the poison's effects, intervenes, battling Gyutaro despite his wounds. Tanjiro reaches Gyutaro's neck but is stabbed in the jaw. His scar transforms into a fiery mark, giving him the strength to slice through. Zenitsu loses momentum without cutting Daki's neck when Inosuke appears, having survived Gyutaro's attack. The demons are beheaded simultaneously, but in the aftermath, Gyutaro's body erupts in blood blades, destroying the city.
44	18 (11)	"No Matter How Many Lives"; Transliteration: "Nando Umarekawatte mo" (Japanese: 何度生まれ変わっても)	Hideki Hosokawa	Toshiyuki Shirai & Takashi Suhara	February 13, 2022 (Note: Episode 44 is a 32 minute special.)	March 24, 2024	9.1%
Nezuko burns the blood blades with her fire. Tanjiro reunites with Zenitsu, Inosuke, and Tengen, while Nezuko burns Gyutaro's poison from their bodies. She and Tanjiro set out to finish off the demons and find them insulting their relationship. When Daki fades away right in front of him, Gyutaro calls her by her true human name; Ume. As he fades into nothing, Gyutaro recalls their past. They were born in a red-light district into poverty and suffered from an abusive mother; despite his appearance burdening him, Ume, considered very attractive as a child, gave them a comfortable life. One day, she attacked a customer of hers and was burned in retaliation. Gyutaro found her and killed the people responsible. They were found by the Upper Rank Six of then and transformed. In the afterlife, the siblings reconcile and walk to Hell together. Serpent Hashira Obanai Iguro arrives, sarcastically praising Tengen for killing Upper Six. However, Tengen relinquishes his position and informs him of Tanjiro's potential. An increasingly ill Kagaya is overjoyed at the news, while Akaza is summoned to the interdimensional Infinity Castle, where he realizes that an Upper Rank has fallen.

== Home media release ==
=== Japanese ===
Aniplex (Japan – Region 2/A)
Volume		Season eps.	Arc eps.	Cover art	Bonus disc	Release date	Ref.
Mugen Train Arc	1	1	1	Kyojuro Rengoku	Soundtrack	January 26, 2022	
Mugen Train Arc	2	2–7	2–7	Tanjiro Kamado and Kyojuro Rengoku	—N/a	February 9, 2022	
Entertainment District Arc	1	8	1	Tengen Uzui	Soundtrack	February 23, 2022	
Entertainment District Arc	2	9–10	2–3	Tanjiro Kamado, Zenitsu Agatsuma and Inosuke Hashibira	Soundtrack	March 30, 2022	
Entertainment District Arc	3	11–12	4–5	Tanjiro Kamado	Soundtrack	April 27, 2022	
Entertainment District Arc	4	13–14	6–7	Nezuko Kamado	Soundtrack	May 25, 2022	
Entertainment District Arc	5	15–16	8–9	Daki and Gyutaro	Soundtrack	June 29, 2022	
Entertainment District Arc	6	17–18	10–11	Tanjiro Kamado and Tengen Uzui	Soundtrack	July 27, 2022	

=== English ===
Crunchyroll, LLC (North America – Region 1/A)
Title	Season eps.	Arc eps.	Standard edition release date	Limited edition release date	Ref.
Mugen Train Arc	1–7	1–7	September 27, 2022		
Entertainment District Arc	8–18	1–11	December 19, 2022		
