= Tanjiro Kamado =

Demon Slayer: Kimetsu no Yaiba character

- Demon Slayer: Kimetsu no Yaiba character
- An original manga illustration of Tanjiro by Koyoharu Gotouge
- First appearance: Demon Slayer: Kimetsu no Yaiba chapter 1: "Cruelty", June 3, 2016
- Last appearance: Demon Slayer: Kimetsu no Yaiba one-shot: "Tanjiro's Status Report", February 4, 2021
- Created by: Koyoharu Gotouge
- Portrayed by: Ryota Kobayashi; Shogo Sakamoto
- Voiced by: Japanese; Natsuki Hanae; English; Zach Aguilar; Allegra Clark (child)

In-universe information
- Species: Human; Demon (briefly)
- Occupation: Charcoal burner Demon Slayer (formerly)
- Affiliation: Demon Slayer Corps
- Fighting style: Water Breathing; Hinokami Kagura (Sun Breathing); Biokinesis (as a demon, temporarily)
- Weapon: Nichirin Sword
- Family: Nezuko Kamado (sister)
- Spouse: Kanao Tsuyuri (future wife)
- Relatives: Kanata Kamado (future great-great-grandson); Sumihiko Kamado (future great-great-grandson)

Tanjiro Kamado (Japanese: 竈門 炭治郎, Hepburn: Kamado Tanjirō) is a fictional character and the main protagonist of the manga series Demon Slayer: Kimetsu no Yaiba, created by Koyoharu Gotouge. Tanjiro goes on a quest to restore the humanity of his sister, Nezuko, after his family was killed and his sister was transformed into a demon by Muzan Kibutsuji following an attack that resulted in the death of his other relatives. After an encounter with Giyu Tomioka, a demon slayer, Tanjiro is recruited by Giyu to also become a demon slayer to help his sister turn human again and avenge his family. He uses Hinokami Kagura (Sun Breathing) with his sword. Tanjiro is a prominent member and character in the Demon Slayer Corps and the archenemy of Muzan and Akaza.

Besides Ufotable's Demon Slayer: Kimetsu no Yaiba anime adaptation, Tanjiro has also appeared in a light novel that acts as a prequel to the manga.

Gotouge created Tanjiro following a suggestion from their editor of having a bright main character who would stand out in his dark narrative. His design was partially influenced by Himura Kenshin from Nobuhiro Watsuki's manga Rurouni Kenshin. The character is primarily voiced by Natsuki Hanae in Japanese and Zach Aguilar in English.

Tanjiro has been well received by manga and anime critics due to his empathetic nature towards others and relationship with his sister. This has led to the character winning multiple awards with Hanae's performance as him also receiving one. Aguilar's performance was also well received.

== Creation and design ==
Early sketches of Nezuko and Tanjiro

Tanjiro Kamado originates from Koyoharu Gotouge's ideas involving a one-shot with Japanese motifs. Tatsuhiko Katayama, their editor at Shueisha, was worried about the one-shot crusade being too dark for the young demographic and asked Gotouge if they could write another type of the main character who would be "brighter". Gotouge has cited issues in the making of the character due to the contrast he has with the dark narrative. For the release of the manga's seventh chapter, Gotouge drew a cover of Tanjiro wielding his sword while smiling. However, due to the contrasting aesthetics the manga had, they discarded the drawing and instead drew a similar design with Tanjiro having a serious expression.

In the initial design, Tanjiro did not have a scar or wear earrings, but in the end, they felt these features accentuated the character. In the making of the cast, Tanjiro had four supporting characters who would balance each other due to their different skills. The editor commented about Tanjiro, "[He] is a type of male main character that you don't see much. He's so kind. He has Nezuko, so he's coming from this position where he can't just say all demons are absolute evil. He's in the gray zone." Tanjiro's design was also influenced by Gotouge's editor; he felt that there was no impact in his appearance and wanted something that would make him stand out, like the scar of Himura Kenshin from Nobuhiro Watsuki's manga Rurouni Kenshin. Katayama commented that the earrings were "a little feminine", but that they accentuated his character.

Yuma Takahashi, the producer behind the adaptation of the manga said he enjoyed Tanjiro's role in the manga, making him engaged in reading the series. For how Tanjiro's Water Breathing was portrayed, Ufotable received inspiration from Hokusai's ukiyo-e style. The first fight scene between Tanjiro and Giyu was also carefully animated to give viewers an appealing choreography. Tanjiro's water-based techniques were created using a mix between hand-drawn animation and CGI, while his battle against Rui was one of the most worked scenes in the making. Takahashi also said that Tanjiro is his most relatable character from the series due to how his constant hard work inspires him. The anime uses an insert theme song titled "Kamado Tanjiro no Uta," expressing his determination to stand up from despair and protect his younger sister.

Tanjiro's Rising Sun Flag-like earrings were altered in China to avoid offending the audience.

When the anime series premiered in China, Tanjiro's design was slightly altered. Due to his hanafuda earrings having Rising Sun-style elements, it was feared it would offend the Mainland leading to brief retouches to them.

=== Voice actors ===
Tanjiro has been voiced by Natsuki Hanae in Japanese. Hanae noted that multiple responses to his career involved him portraying sad characters. However, in Tanjiro's case, he said Tanjiro is on the easy side because he says what he thinks, and is not the type that thinks one way and other things. Nezuko's actress, Akari Kitō, said Hanae is like a big brother to her at the studio, supportive and if there are parts she has difficulty recording, Hanae would stay and wait till she finishes even though his part has finished. Hanae said he also thinks of Kitō as a younger sister. He also says it is easier for him to do his best when he is around people with whom he is friendly. Tanjiro's fighting style was liked by Hanae who reported he often made Tanjiro's shouts when playing video games. He appreciated the feedback he was given by the viewers of the anime.

English voice actor Zach Aguilar was overjoyed when being given the role of voicing Tanjiro in the dub due to him being a fan of the series, as well as noting he was supported by multiple fans. In another news, Aguilar ended liking the character as well as his fellow companions, wishing to find merchandising of Tanjiro. Allegra Clark voices Tanjiro as an infant. Clark admitted she became emotional during the recording of the series and liked the younger incarnation of the character.

== Appearances ==
=== In Demon Slayer: Kimetsu no Yaiba ===
The protagonist of Demon Slayer: Kimetsu no Yaiba, Tanjiro Kamado is the oldest son of already deceased charcoal-seller Tanjuro and Kie. In the first chapter of the manga, he finds his mother and his younger siblings murdered by a demon named Muzan Kibutsuji, with the only survivor being his sister Nezuko Kamado for having been turned into a demon. After seeing Tanjiro's skills in battle as well as Nezuko's unwillingness to devour her brother, Giyu Tomioka sends the siblings to Sakonji Urokodaki on Mt. Sagiri in order to become a demon slayer. Tanjiro vows to save his sister and defeat Muzan in the process.

Tanjiro trains under Sakonji for two years, learning the "Water Breathing" (水の呼吸法, Mizu no Kokyū-hō) sword-style and improving his ability. He is instructed by Sakonji to slice a large rock in order to be allowed to partake in the Final Selection, which he succeeds in doing so with the help of ghosts Sabito and Makomo. Tanjiro becomes a member of the Demon Slayer Corps after surviving the Final Selection, during which he slays a demon who was responsible for the deaths of Sabito and Makomo.

During his first days as a Demon Slayer, Tanjiro finds Muzan at Asakusa. Muzan manages to escape by turning a passerby into a demon as a distraction, but is infuriated upon seeing Tanjiro's hanafuda earrings and vows to kill him. The siblings later meet friendly demons named Tamayo and Yushiro, assisting with their research to find a way to restore Nezuko's humanity. As a result, Tanjiro starts collecting samples of blood from the demons he vanquishes through their cat Chachamaru.

Tanjiro becomes traveling partners with fellow Demon Slayers Zenitsu Agatsuma and Inosuke Hashibira. Later in his battle against the demon Rui, Tanjiro remembers the Kamado family dance, which his father had wanted to pass on the next generation; he imitates the dance to perform the Hinokami Kagura (ヒノカミ神楽; lit. 'Dance of the Sun God') technique, which unbeknownst to him is based on the original breath style, the Sun Breathing (日の呼吸, Hi no Kokyū), merging both to create a more sustainable fighting style. After Rui's defeat at the hands of Giyu, Tanjiro and Nezuko are prosecuted by Shinobu Kocho due to Nezuko's presence, but they are pardoned by their superior Kagaya Ubuyashiki. He is granted shelter at the Butterfly Mansion, where he recovers and trains with its inhabitants.

Tanjiro and his friends, alongside Kyojuro Rengoku, embark on the Mugen Train to defeat Enmu, with Kyojuro dying after a chance meeting with Akaza. This leads to Tanjiro meeting Kyojuro's family, where his father and predecessor provided vital information on its status after a violent confrontation. His sword's color is black, occasionally turning crimson red and becoming much stronger when combined with Nezuko's Blood Burst, a technique he later learns to perform without her help.

Tanjiro goes to the top secret Swordsmith Village to acquire a new katana, acquiring Yoriichi Tsugikuni's sword by sheer coincidence and defeating Hatengu in the area with the help of other Slayers. Due to Nezuko's sun immunity causing alert in the Demon Slayer Training, he partakes in the Hashira Training, developing his physical abilities to his full potential before the final battle with Muzan.

Upon arriving at Muzan's location, where he is incapacitated by Ubuyashiki's suicide bombing, Tanjiro is sent to the Infinity Castle with Giyu, where they fight Akaza in a long confrontation. He perfects his Hinokami Kagura technique by entering the Transparent World and Selfless State, beheading Akaza, only for him to regenerate and subsequently commit suicide.

Tanjiro reaches Muzan and fights him with the other Slayers; upon reaching the surface mere hours before dawn, he relives Yoriichi Tsugikuni's memories and perfects Sun Breathing technique, finally defeating Muzan after losing an eye and an arm in the fight and significant casualties. However, Muzan turns Tanjiro into his successor as the Demon King, causing him to go feral and lash out at his allies, but a human Nezuko and his friends manage to revert his transformation in time. He heals his lost arm and eye, which otherwise remain non-functional after turning back into a human and thus end up rendering him being physically disabled.

After the Demon Slayers' disbandment, Tanjiro returns to his life as a charcoal burner, with Nezuko, Zenitsu and Inosuke living with him, despite receiving an absurdly large pension from the Ubuyashiki family. He eventually marries fellow Demon Slayer Kanao Tsuyuri, with two great-great-grandsons, Kanata and Sumihiko Kamado, alive in the present day.

=== Other appearances ===
A light novel entitled Demon Slayer: Flower of Happiness chronicles the lives of Tanjiro and Zenitsu before the start of the main series. Merchandising based on Tanjiro has also been released. The character is also playable in the video game Demon Slayer: Kimetsu no Yaiba – The Hinokami Chronicles.

In the stage play Demon Slayer: The Stage, Ryota Kobayashi and Shogo Sakamoto portray Tanjiro.

== Reception ==
=== Popularity ===
Tanjiro's character has been very popular. He was ranked in first place in the first Demon Slayer: Kimetsu no Yaiba character popularity poll with 6,742 votes. Anime! Anime! did a poll in 2020 involving Tanjiro's character. Readers voted his first usage of the fire technique as the best action performed by the character. Meanwhile, his bond with Nezuko was also voted as having one of the best quotes in the manga. In February 2020 at the 4th Crunchyroll Anime Awards, Tanjiro won the "Best Boy" category while he was nominated for "Best Protagonist". His fight with Nezuko against Rui won "Best Fight Scene". This scene was heavily commented by the critics with IGN regarding it as one of the best television episode series of all times based on the visual and execution. Manga.Tokyo enjoyed the build up to this scene as Nezuko manages to assist Tanjiro. Due to the emotional delivery of this scene, the writer look forward to more interactions between the two siblings.

Tanjiro won the Newtype Anime Award for "Best Male Character" for his role in the series, along with Natsuki Hanae also being awarded "Best Voice Actor" for his performance as Tanjiro. He was one of the five recipients for the "Best Boys of the Decade" category in the Funimation's Decade of Anime fan poll. He also appeared in TV Time article featuring the best characters from 2019. In a Benesse survey, Tanjiro was voted as the most trusted character by Shinkenzemi Elementary School Course.

In November 2020, Hong Kong police posted an image of its anti-fraud mascot resembling Tanjiro. Hong Kong pro-democracy activist Agnes Chow expressed fears for its similarities with the character, stating that while it is not a copyright violation, he was disappointed by the lack of creative rights. A card illustrated by Gin Tama author Hideaki Sorachi, depicting Tanjiro and the Hashira, was given to the theatergoers in the film's first week of screenings of Gintama The Final Film. In October 2021, Shueisha failed its appeal to trademark the clothing patterns for the following Demon Slayer: Kimetsu no Yaiba including Tanjiro among others.

=== Critical reception ===
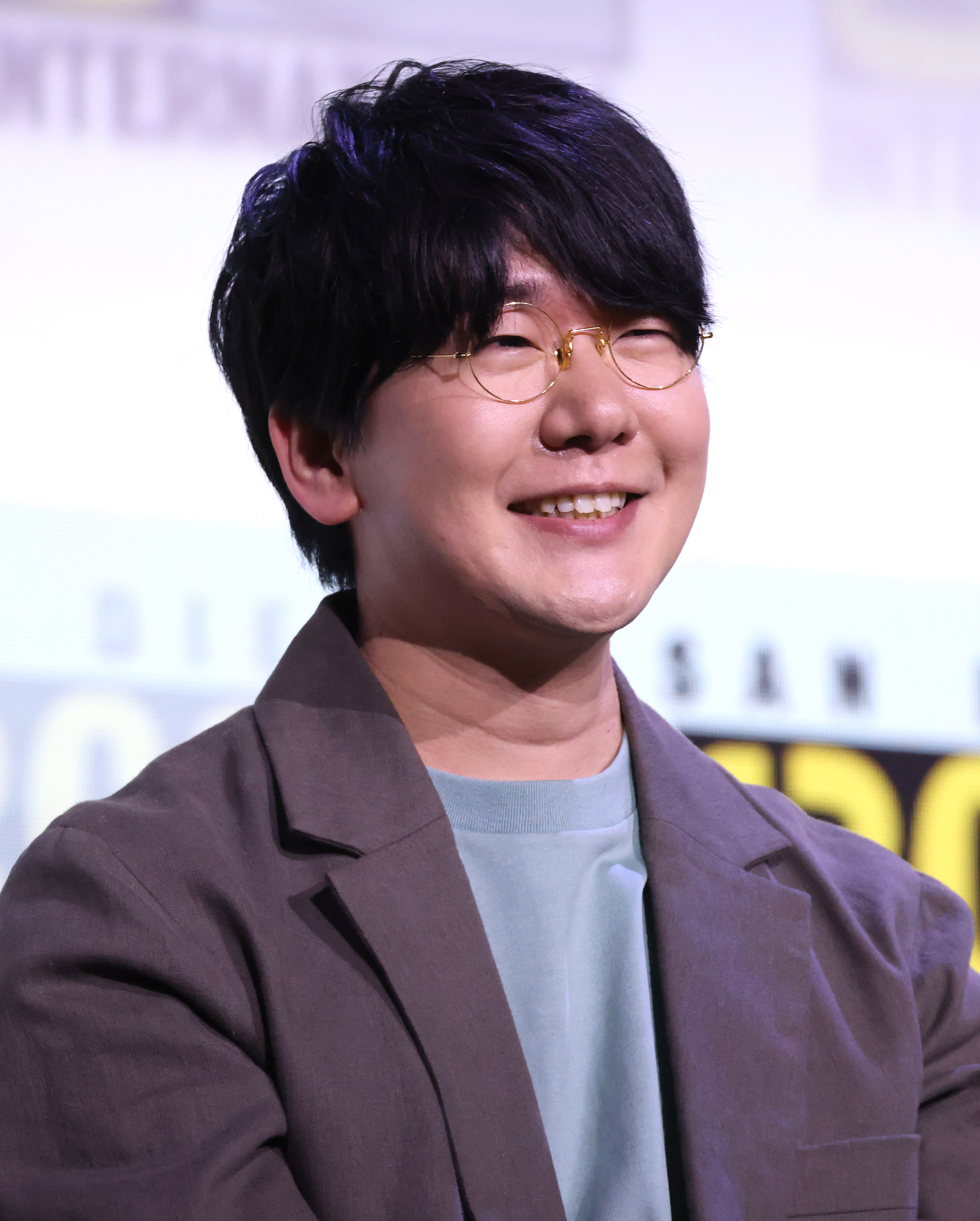
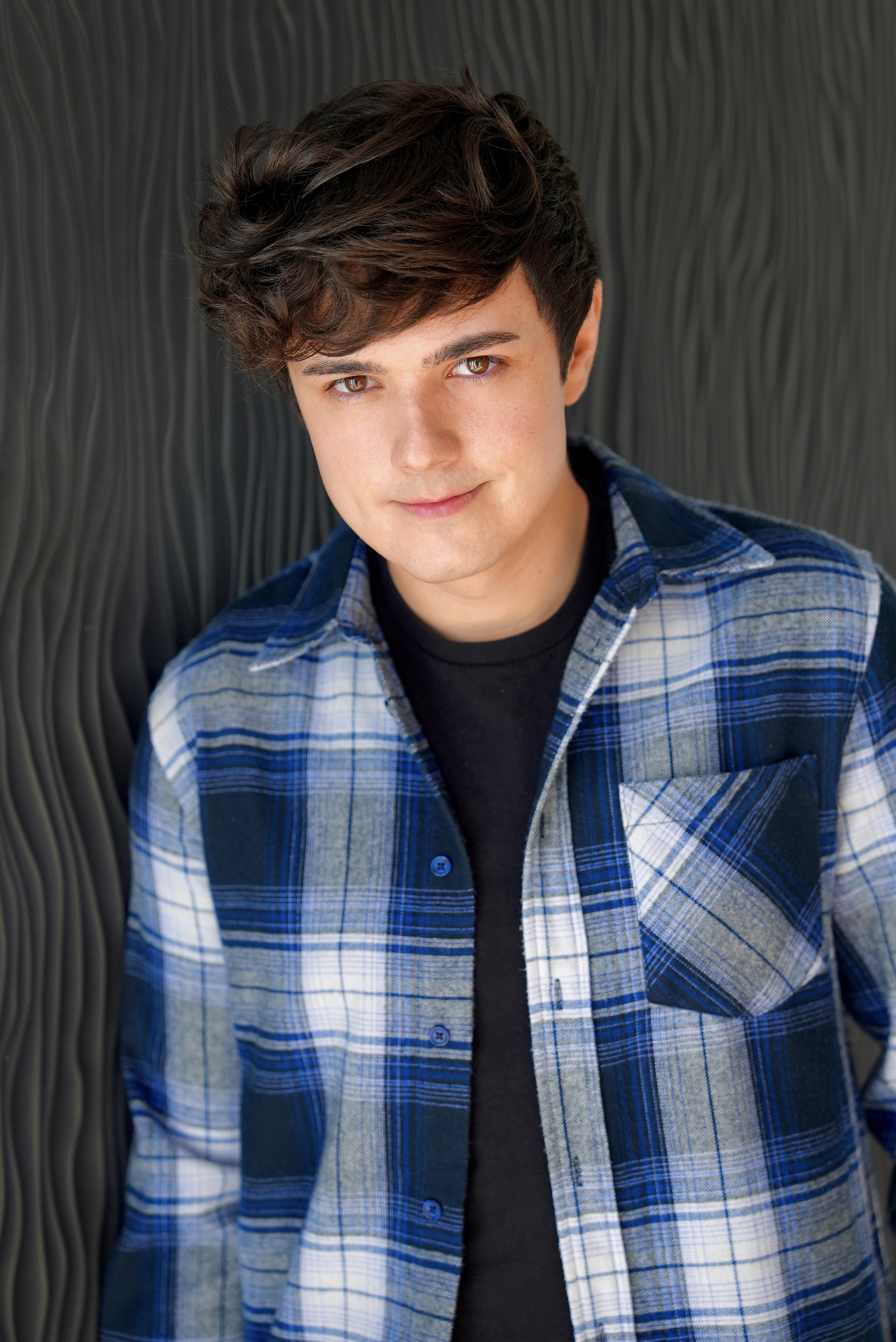
Natsuki Hanae (left) voices Tanjiro in Japanese and Zach Aguilar voices him in the English dub of the series.

Critical reception to Tanjiro's character has been positive ever since his introduction. Otaku USA found Tanjiro an anti-stereotypical take from the shōnen main characters due to his sole motivation of saving Nezuko, calling him a "fascinating breath of fresh air", while highlighting his friendly personality in a dark story. Anime News Network also liked Tanjiro's design due to how it translates the narrative of his family being poor, while also liking the way the characters lives with them and later only Nezuko. Comic Book Bin felt Tanjiro's journey was inspirational due to the pain he goes to save Nezuko, making him likable. Anime Inferno said "Tanjiro and Nezuko make a great team and are two enjoyable protagonists, with the series at its best when the two siblings are working together." While noting that the character becomes a warrior in the second manga volume, the writer believed he might experience major pain through his quest. Nevertheless, regardless of how many battles he takes, Comic Book Bin enjoyed how Tanjiro retained his caring personality. Anime News Network said that while he keeps being well meaning in following arcs, he still shows a more aggressive side when fighting demons, making him multi-faceted. IGN noted that Tanjiro stands out due to his caring traits, comparing him to Allen Walker from Katsura Hoshino's D.Gray-man series who also exhibits these traits when being faced with the dilemma of hurting an enemy. Tanjiro's relationship with Nezuko was acclaimed by IGN as "one of the most endearing parts of Demon Slayer: Kimetsu no Yaiba, if not arguably its beating heart and soul". The Fandom Post also liked Tanjiro's care for others even if the other characters he meets are antagonists, with most of them being demons. As a result, Fandom Post believed the writing in the manga made him endearing. Similarly, Manga.Tokyo questioned how would Tanjiro change in his quest due to his need of becoming stronger and whether or not he might reach the happy ending he wants. In Jungian Dimensions of the Mourning Process, Burial Rituals and Access to the Land of the Dead: Intimations of Immortality, the writer Hiroko Sakata addressed similarities the Kamado siblings with the Forgotten God Hiruko, the Oni Katako and the child K, citing the Kamado' stories as modernized version of Japanese myths, comparing them with Yuta Okkotsu and Rika Orimoto from the manga Jujutsu Kaisen 0 as both aim to control the Oni element present in the narrative and become fighters in the process.

In regards to Ufotable's handling of the series, Manga.Tokyo liked his visual appearance, finding it outstanding within the shonen genre, but felt that his struggle with Giyu was harsh, making the main character more likable. Natsuki Hanae's performance as Tanjiro's Japanese voice actor was praised by the reviewer. Nevertheless, the handling of Tanjiro's horror in regards to Nezuko's condition was the subject of praise. The Fandom Post enjoyed Tanjiro's debut in the series due to how Ufotable handled the character's shock upon the tragedy of his family and how he battles Giyu in order to protect his sister. As a result, he sees Tanjiro as a character with potential to be appealing. The same website also enjoyed how skilled Tanjiro became in the manga's tenth volume, making it one of the best reasons to keep following the printed media. The English actor, Zach Aguilar, was also praised for his performance as Tanjiro.

Gadget Tsūshin listed both the breathing techniques suffix and "Ah! The era, the era changed again!" in their 2019 anime buzzwords list. Manga.Tokyo felt Tanjiro's characterization to be unique within the series the writer has seen, citing the scenes where the character cheers himself up and tries to work for his responsibilities. Tanjiro's skills in regards to his breathing was noted to be one of the most surprising events in the anime series by Latin America's IGN. In late 2019, IGN wondered about the possibilities of Tanjiro dying in the manga at the hands of Muzan due to the multiple wounds he suffered in his match against the demon.
