= Zankyōsanka/Asa ga Kuru =

Single by Aimer

from the album Open α Door
- Language: Japanese
- Released: December 6, 2021
- Genre: J-pop; anison
- Length: 18:58
- Label: Sacra Music
- Songwriters: aimerrhythm; Masahiro Tobinai
- Producers: Masahiro Hiuchi; Kenji Tamai; Yuki Kajiura

Aimer singles chronology
"One and Last" (2021)	"Zankyōsanka/Asa ga Kuru" (2021)	"Wavy Flow" (2022)

Music video
- Asa ga Kuru on YouTube

Music video
- Zankyōsanka on YouTube

"Zankyōsanka/Asa ga Kuru" (残響散歌/朝が来る) is the twentieth single by Japanese singer Aimer, released "Zankyōsanka" on December 6, 2021, later released "Asa ga Kuru" on January 12, 2022 both under Sacra Music. The song serves as the opening and ending songs of Demon Slayer: Kimetsu no Yaiba – Entertainment District Arc. She also performed "Zankyōsanka" on The First Take and the 73rd NHK Kōhaku Uta Gassen.

== Track listing ==
=== CD ===
No.	Title	Lyrics	Music	Arrangement	Length
1.	"Zankyōsanka"	aimerrhythm	Masahiro Tobinai	Masahiro Tobina; Kenji Tamai	3:04
2.	"Asa ga Kuru"	Yuki Kajiura	Kajiura	Kajiura	4:54
3.	"Zankyōsanka (instrumental)"				3:04
4.	"Asa ga Kuru (instrumental)"				4:54
5.	"Zankyōsanka (TV ver.)"				1:31
6.	"Asa ga Kuru (TV ver.)"				1:31

== Charts ==
Chart (2022)	Peak position
Billboard Global 200	37
Japanese Oricon Singles Chart	1
Billboard Japan Hot 100	1
