= Akeboshi (song) =

Single by Lisa

from the album Lander
- Language: Japanese
- A-side: "Shirogane"
- Released: October 18, 2021
- Genre: Rock
- Length: 4:29
- Label: Sacra Music
- Songwriter: Yuki Kajiura

Lisa singles chronology
"Yuke" (2021)	"Akeboshi" (2021)	"Shirogane" (2021)

Audio sample
- file; help

Music video
- "Akeboshi" on YouTube

"Akeboshi" (Japanese: 明け星; lit. 'Morning Star') is a song recorded by Japanese singer Lisa, released on October 18, 2021. The song was featured as the opening theme song for the anime Demon Slayer: Kimetsu no Yaiba – Mugen Train Arc. It charted at No. 1 on the Oricon Daily Digital Singles Chart with 36,062 downloads in its first day release. The song also peaked at number one on Japan Hot 100 and number 107 on Billboard Global 200.

== Background and release ==
On September 25, 2021, Lisa's official website announced that she would be performing the opening and ending themes for the anime Demon Slayer: Kimetsu no Yaiba – Mugen Train Arc premiering on October 10, 2021, with "Akeboshi" as the opening theme and "Shirogane" as the ending theme. Both songs were released as a double A-side single on November 17, 2021. Prior to the single's release, "Akeboshi" is available for download from October 18, 2021.

== Composition ==
"Akeboshi" is composed in the key of C-sharp major and is set in time signature of common time with a tempo of 95 BPM, runs for four minutes and 29 seconds. Written and composed by Yuki Kajiura, the song starts with strings in the intro, giving off an atmosphere of fantasy, melancholy, and mystery; then a guitar riffs reverberates through the middle of the song. The melody is reminiscent of Aimer's song "I Beg You" which also composed by Kajiura. Lisa describes "Akeboshi" as a song of entrusted thoughts, hopes and curses.

== Music video ==
The music video for "Akeboshi" was released on November 7, 2021, and directed by Masakazu Fukatsu. Based on the world view of the song, it expresses "a hope in the midst of chaos". It shows Lisa performing the song in a railroad tunnel illuminated by lanterns and on a lawn surrounded by flames at night, mixing with images of liquids called "Alive Painting" created by painter Akiko Nakayama. As of May 2022, "Akeboshi" has over 20 million views on YouTube.

== Personnel ==
- Lisa – vocals
- Yuki Kajiura – lyrics, composer, arranger, keyboards, programming
- Tomoharu Takahashi – bass guitar
- Koichi Korenaga – guitar
- Kyoichi Sato – drums
- Hitoshi Konno – strings
- Takashi Koiwa – record, mixing
- Nobuyuki Murakami – record
- Mio Hirai – assistant engineer

== Charts ==
=== Weekly charts ===
Chart performance for "Akeboshi"
Chart (2021)	Peak position
Global 200 (Billboard)	107
Japan Hot 100 (Billboard)	1
Japan Hot Animation (Billboard Japan)	1
Japan (Oricon) Akeboshi / Shirogane	4
Japan Combined Singles (Oricon) Akeboshi / Shirogane	2
US World Digital Song Sales (Billboard)	19

=== Year-end charts ===
Chart performance for "Akeboshi"
Chart (2021)	Peak position
Japan (Oricon) Akeboshi / Shirogane	74
Japan Hot Animation (Billboard Japan)	16
Chart (2022)	Position
Japan Hot Animation (Billboard Japan)	20
Japan Download Songs (Billboard Japan)	23

== Sales and certifications ==
Certifications for "Akeboshi"
Region	Certification	Certified units/sales
Japan (RIAJ) Physical	Gold	100,000^{^}
Japan (RIAJ) Digital	Platinum	250,000^{*}
Streaming
Japan (RIAJ)	Gold	50,000,000^{†}
^{*} Sales figures based on certification alone.^{^} Shipments figures based on certification alone.^{†} Streaming-only figures based on certification alone.

== Awards and nominations ==
Awards and nominations for "Akeboshi"
Award Ceremony	Year	Category	Result	Ref.
Reiwa Anisong Awards	2021	Artist Song Award	Nominated	
63rd Japan Record Awards	2021	Song of the Year	Won	
