= Kamado Tanjiro no Uta =

Single by Go Shiina featuring Nami Nakagawa

from the album Demon Slayer: Kimetsu no Yaiba Tanjiro Kamado, Unwavering Resolve Arc Original Soundtrack
- Language: Japanese
- Released: August 30, 2019
- Genre: J-pop
- Length: 5:32
- Label: Aniplex
- Composer: Go Shiina
- Lyricist: Ufotable

"Kamado Tanjiro no Uta" (竈門炭治郎のうた; lit. "Tanjiro Kamado's song") is a song by Japanese composer Go Shiina featuring Nami Nakagawa, released on August 30, 2019. It was used as an insert song of the TV anime series Demon Slayer: Kimetsu no Yaiba by Ufotable.

== Composition and lyrics ==
The composer Go Shiina, who is also involved in the production of anime gekitomo music, composed the song. Nami Nakagawa, who is in charge of vocals, participates as a chorus in various scenes in the animation, including the voice that flows in the subtitle of "Kimetsu no Yaiba".

The lyrics were written by Ufotable. This song sounds a bit like a lullaby and expresses the determination of the main character, Tanjiro Kamado, who stands up from despair and struggles to protect his younger sister Nezuko. Manga.Tokyo praised the song, commenting "it was a good way to finish the narrative about the Kamado siblings." The song was used in the climax scene and ending of episode 19 "Hinokami".

Episode 19 of Demon Slayer, titled “Hinokami,” became a turning point in the series due to its stunning animation and emotional climax between Tanjiro, Nezuko, and Rui. The insert song “Kamado Tanjiro no Uta” played during this scene gained huge attention online. After the episode aired, many fans requested a full version of the song. In response, the production released the single, which achieved unusually high digital download performance for an insert track.

== Live performances ==
"Kamado Tanjiro no Uta" was performed for the first time on TBS TV "CDTV Live! Live! Christmas 4 Hours Special" which was broadcast live on December 21, 2020. On December 30 of the same year, it was performed live at the same station's "62nd Shining! Japan Record Awards" and as a special project because Demon Slayer: Kimetsu no Yaiba won a special prize.

== Charts ==
Chart performance for "Kamado Tanjiro no Uta"
Chart (2020)	Peak positions
Japan Hot 100 (Billboard)	26
Japan Hot Animation (Billboard Japan)	4
Japan Digital Singles (Oricon)	3

== Certifications ==
Region	Certification	Certified units/sales
Japan (RIAJ) Digital	Platinum	250,000^{*}
^{*} Sales figures based on certification alone.
