= Demon hunter =

Character in fiction who hunts and destroys demons

A demon hunter or demon slayer is a demonology-related historic occupation or folkloric character which specializes in killing demons.

The character may be found in myths, Abrahamic religions, African magic, Christian media, Classic Chinese Novels, Hinduism.

== Examples ==
In Hinduism, Indra, is described as a demon hunter.

== See also ==
- Category:Fictional demon hunters
- Dragonslayer
- Exorcism
- Spiritual warfare
- Vampire hunter
