= Anime Grand Prix =

Annual award granted by magazine Animage

- Awarded for: Best in anime of the previous year
- Country: Japan
- Presented by: Tokuma Shoten
- First award: 1979; 47 years ago
- Website: animageplus.jp

The Anime Grand Prix (アニメグランプリ) is an annual Japanese anime award given to recognize the best in anime of the previous year, decided by the votes of readers of entertainment magazine Animage, published by Tokuma Shoten since July 1978. The Anime Grand Prix started in 1979, and the first prize was announced in the January 1980 issue, generally announced at the next year's June issue every year.

== Best Title ==
=== 20th Century ===
No.	Year	Winner (1st place)	Studio	Type	Runners Up (2nd–8th places)		Studio	Type
1	1979	Mobile Suit Gundam	Sunrise	TV	2nd	Galaxy Express 999: The Movie	Toei Animation	FF
1	1979	Mobile Suit Gundam	Sunrise	TV	3rd	Space Pirate Captain Harlock	Toei Animation	TV
1	1979	Mobile Suit Gundam	Sunrise	TV	4th	Cyborg 009	Sunrise	TV
1	1979	Mobile Suit Gundam	Sunrise	TV	5th	Galaxy Express 999	Toei Animation	TV
1	1979	Mobile Suit Gundam	Sunrise	TV	6th	Song of Baseball Enthusiasts	Nippon Animation	TV
1	1979	Mobile Suit Gundam	Sunrise	TV	7th	Treasure Island	TMS Entertainment	TV
1	1979	Mobile Suit Gundam	Sunrise	TV	8th	Arrivederci Yamato	Academy Productions	FF
2	1980 1st half	Mobile Suit Gundam	Sunrise	TV	2nd	Toward the Terra	Toei Animation	FF
2	1980 1st half	Mobile Suit Gundam	Sunrise	TV	3rd	Cyborg 009	Sunrise	TV
2	1980 1st half	Mobile Suit Gundam	Sunrise	TV	4th	Marco Polo's Adventures	Madhouse	TV
2	1980 1st half	Mobile Suit Gundam	Sunrise	TV	5th	Lupin III: The Castle of Cagliostro	TMS Entertainment	FF
2	1980 1st half	Mobile Suit Gundam	Sunrise	TV	6th	Space Runaway Ideon	Sunrise	TV
2	1980 1st half	Mobile Suit Gundam	Sunrise	TV	7th	Space Pirate Captain Harlock	Toei Animation	TV
2	1980 1st half	Mobile Suit Gundam	Sunrise	TV	8th	Space Battleship Yamato II	Academy Productions	TV
3	1980 2nd half	Space Runaway Ideon	Sunrise	TV	2nd	Cyborg 009: Legend of the Super Galaxy	Toei Animation	FF
3	1980 2nd half	Space Runaway Ideon	Sunrise	TV	3rd	Be Forever Yamato	Academy Productions	FF
3	1980 2nd half	Space Runaway Ideon	Sunrise	TV	4th	Lupin III Part 2	TMS Entertainment	TV
3	1980 2nd half	Space Runaway Ideon	Sunrise	TV	5th	Tomorrow's Joe 2	TMS Entertainment	TV
3	1980 2nd half	Space Runaway Ideon	Sunrise	TV	6th	Do Your Best Genki	Toei Animation	TV
3	1980 2nd half	Space Runaway Ideon	Sunrise	TV	7th	The Wonderful Adventures of Nils	Studio Pierrot	TV
3	1980 2nd half	Space Runaway Ideon	Sunrise	TV	8th	The Adventures of Tom Sawyer	Nippon Animation	TV
4	1981	Adieu Galaxy Express 999	Toei Animation	FF	2nd	Warring Demon God GoShogun	Ashi Productions	TV
4	1981	Adieu Galaxy Express 999	Toei Animation	FF	3rd	Mobile Suit Gundam II: Soldiers of Sorrow	Sunrise	FF
4	1981	Adieu Galaxy Express 999	Toei Animation	FF	4th	Six God Combination Godmars	TMS Entertainment	TV
4	1981	Adieu Galaxy Express 999	Toei Animation	FF	5th	Space Runaway Ideon	Sunrise	TV
4	1981	Adieu Galaxy Express 999	Toei Animation	FF	6th	Urusei Yatsura	Studio Pierrot	TV
4	1981	Adieu Galaxy Express 999	Toei Animation	FF	7th	Space Warrior Baldios: The Movie	Ashi Productions & Kokusai Eigasha	FF
4	1981	Adieu Galaxy Express 999	Toei Animation	FF	8th	The Sea Prince and the Fire Child	Sanrio Films	FF
5	1982	Six God Combination Godmars	TMS Entertainment	TV	2nd	Combat Mecha Xabungle	Sunrise	TV
5	1982	Six God Combination Godmars	TMS Entertainment	TV	3rd	Mobile Suit Gundam III: Encounters in Space	Sunrise	FF
5	1982	Six God Combination Godmars	TMS Entertainment	TV	4th	Urusei Yatsura	Studio Pierrot	TV
5	1982	Six God Combination Godmars	TMS Entertainment	TV	5th	Godmars: The Movie	TMS Entertainment	FF
5	1982	Six God Combination Godmars	TMS Entertainment	TV	6th	Super Dimension Fortress Macross	Artland & Tatsunoko	TV
5	1982	Six God Combination Godmars	TMS Entertainment	TV	7th	Ideon: Be Invoked	Sunrise	FF
5	1982	Six God Combination Godmars	TMS Entertainment	TV	8th	Magical Princess Minky Momo	Ashi Productions	TV
6	1983	Crusher Joe	Sunrise	FF	2nd	Super Dimension Fortress Macross	Artland & Tatsunoko	TV
6	1983	Crusher Joe	Sunrise	FF	3rd	Future Policeman Urashiman	Tatsunoko	TV
6	1983	Crusher Joe	Sunrise	FF	4th	Aura Battler Dunbine	Sunrise	TV
6	1983	Crusher Joe	Sunrise	FF	5th	Urusei Yatsura: Only You	Studio Pierrot	FF
6	1983	Crusher Joe	Sunrise	FF	6th	Urusei Yatsura	Studio Pierrot	TV
6	1983	Crusher Joe	Sunrise	FF	7th	Armored Trooper Votoms	Sunrise	TV
6	1983	Crusher Joe	Sunrise	FF	8th	Harmagedon	Madhouse	FF
7	1984	Nausicaä of the Valley of the Wind	Topcraft	FF	2nd	Macross: Do You Remember Love?	Artland & Tatsunoko	FF
7	1984	Nausicaä of the Valley of the Wind	Topcraft	FF	3rd	Urusei Yatsura 2: Beautiful Dreamer	Studio Pierrot	FF
7	1984	Nausicaä of the Valley of the Wind	Topcraft	FF	4th	Galactic Drifter Vifam	Sunrise	TV
7	1984	Nausicaä of the Valley of the Wind	Topcraft	FF	5th	Heavy Metal L-Gaim	Sunrise	TV
7	1984	Nausicaä of the Valley of the Wind	Topcraft	FF	6th	Giant Gorg	Sunrise	TV
7	1984	Nausicaä of the Valley of the Wind	Topcraft	FF	7th	Magic Angel Creamy Mami	Studio Pierrot	TV
7	1984	Nausicaä of the Valley of the Wind	Topcraft	FF	8th	Little Memole	Toei Animation	TV
8	1985	Dirty Pair	Sunrise	TV	2nd	Zeta Gundam	Sunrise	TV
8	1985	Dirty Pair	Sunrise	TV	3rd	Urusei Yatsura 3: Remember My Love	Studio Deen	FF
8	1985	Dirty Pair	Sunrise	TV	4th	Touch	Group TAC	TV
8	1985	Dirty Pair	Sunrise	TV	5th	Super Beast Machine God Dancouga	Ashi Productions	TV
8	1985	Dirty Pair	Sunrise	TV	6th	Urusei Yatsura	Studio Deen	TV
8	1985	Dirty Pair	Sunrise	TV	7th	Creamy Mami: Once More Forever	Studio Pierrot	DVF
8	1985	Dirty Pair	Sunrise	TV	8th	Blue Comet SPT Layzner	Sunrise	TV
9	1986	Castle in the Sky	Studio Ghibli	FF	2nd	Gundam ZZ	Sunrise	TV
9	1986	Castle in the Sky	Studio Ghibli	FF	3rd	Zeta Gundam	Sunrise	TV
9	1986	Castle in the Sky	Studio Ghibli	FF	4th	Arion	Sunrise	FF
9	1986	Castle in the Sky	Studio Ghibli	FF	5th	Blue Comet SPT Layzner	Sunrise	TV
9	1986	Castle in the Sky	Studio Ghibli	FF	6th	Maison Ikkoku	Studio Deen	TV
9	1986	Castle in the Sky	Studio Ghibli	FF	7th	Spaceship Sagittarius	Nippon Animation	TV
9	1986	Castle in the Sky	Studio Ghibli	FF	8th	Urusei Yatsura 4: Lum the Forever	Studio Deen	FF
10	1987	Saint Seiya	Toei Animation	TV	2nd	Red Photon Zillion	Tatsunoko	TV
10	1987	Saint Seiya	Toei Animation	TV	3rd	Maison Ikkoku	Studio Deen	TV
10	1987	Saint Seiya	Toei Animation	TV	4th	The Wings of Honnêamise	Gainax	FF
10	1987	Saint Seiya	Toei Animation	TV	5th	Spaceship Sagittarius	Nippon Animation	TV
10	1987	Saint Seiya	Toei Animation	TV	6th	Gundam ZZ	Sunrise	TV
10	1987	Saint Seiya	Toei Animation	TV	7th	Tales of Little Women	Nippon Animation	TV
10	1987	Saint Seiya	Toei Animation	TV	8th	Kimagure Orange Road	Studio Pierrot	TV
11	1988	My Neighbor Totoro	Studio Ghibli	FF	2nd	Saint Seiya	Toei Animation	TV
11	1988	My Neighbor Totoro	Studio Ghibli	FF	3rd	Sonic Soldier Borgman	Ashi Productions	TV
11	1988	My Neighbor Totoro	Studio Ghibli	FF	4th	Ronin Warriors	Sunrise	TV
11	1988	My Neighbor Totoro	Studio Ghibli	FF	5th	Akira	TMS Entertainment	FF
11	1988	My Neighbor Totoro	Studio Ghibli	FF	6th	Gundam: Char's Counterattack	Sunrise	FF
11	1988	My Neighbor Totoro	Studio Ghibli	FF	7th	The Three Musketeers	Studio Gallop	TV
11	1988	My Neighbor Totoro	Studio Ghibli	FF	8th	Urusei Yatsura 5: The Final Chapter	Magic Bus	FF
12	1989	Kiki's Delivery Service	Studio Ghibli	FF	2nd	Legend of Heavenly Sphere Shurato	Tatsunoko	TV
12	1989	Kiki's Delivery Service	Studio Ghibli	FF	3rd	Patlabor	I.G. Tatsunoko	FF
12	1989	Kiki's Delivery Service	Studio Ghibli	FF	4th	Dragon Ball Z	Toei Animation	TV
12	1989	Kiki's Delivery Service	Studio Ghibli	FF	5th	Madö King Granzört	Sunrise	TV
12	1989	Kiki's Delivery Service	Studio Ghibli	FF	6th	Ronin Warriors	Sunrise	TV
12	1989	Kiki's Delivery Service	Studio Ghibli	FF	7th	Ranma ½	Studio Deen	TV
12	1989	Kiki's Delivery Service	Studio Ghibli	FF	8th	Gunbuster	Gainax	OVA
13	1990	Nadia and the Secret of Blue Water	Gainax & Group TAC	TV	2nd	Mashin Hero Wataru 2	Sunrise	TV
13	1990	Nadia and the Secret of Blue Water	Gainax & Group TAC	TV	3rd	Dragon Ball Z	Toei Animation	TV
13	1990	Nadia and the Secret of Blue Water	Gainax & Group TAC	TV	4th	Patlabor: The Mobile Police	Sunrise	TV
13	1990	Nadia and the Secret of Blue Water	Gainax & Group TAC	TV	5th	Ranma ½	Studio Deen	TV
13	1990	Nadia and the Secret of Blue Water	Gainax & Group TAC	TV	6th	NG Knight Ramune & 40	Ashi Productions	TV
13	1990	Nadia and the Secret of Blue Water	Gainax & Group TAC	TV	7th	Like the Clouds, Like the Wind	Studio Pierrot	TF
13	1990	Nadia and the Secret of Blue Water	Gainax & Group TAC	TV	8th	Chibi Maruko-chan	Nippon Animation	TV
14	1991	Future GPX Cyber Formula	Sunrise	TV	2nd	Nadia and the Secret of Blue Water	Gainax & Group TAC	TV
14	1991	Future GPX Cyber Formula	Sunrise	TV	3rd	Dragon Ball Z	Toei Animation	TV
14	1991	Future GPX Cyber Formula	Sunrise	TV	4th	Ranma ½	Studio Deen	TV
14	1991	Future GPX Cyber Formula	Sunrise	TV	5th	Only Yesterday	Studio Ghibli	FF
14	1991	Future GPX Cyber Formula	Sunrise	TV	6th	Mashin Hero Wataru 2	Sunrise	TV
14	1991	Future GPX Cyber Formula	Sunrise	TV	7th	Matchless Raijin-Oh	Sunrise	TV
14	1991	Future GPX Cyber Formula	Sunrise	TV	8th	Gundam F91	Sunrise	FF
15	1992	Sailor Moon	Toei Animation	TV	2nd	YuYu Hakusho	Studio Pierrot	TV
15	1992	Sailor Moon	Toei Animation	TV	3rd	Porco Rosso	Studio Ghibli	FF
15	1992	Sailor Moon	Toei Animation	TV	4th	Minky Momo: Hold on to Your Dreams	Ashi Productions	TV
15	1992	Sailor Moon	Toei Animation	TV	5th	Mama Is Just a Fourth Grade Pupil	Sunrise	TV
15	1992	Sailor Moon	Toei Animation	TV	6th	Dragon Ball Z	Toei Animation	TV
15	1992	Sailor Moon	Toei Animation	TV	7th	Ranma ½	Studio Deen	TV
15	1992	Sailor Moon	Toei Animation	TV	8th	The Brave of Legend Da-Garn	Sunrise	TV
16	1993	YuYu Hakusho	Studio Pierrot	TV	2nd	Sailor Moon R	Toei Animation	TV
16	1993	YuYu Hakusho	Studio Pierrot	TV	3rd	Oh My Goddess!	AIC	OVA
16	1993	YuYu Hakusho	Studio Pierrot	TV	4th	The Irresponsible Captain Tylor	Tatsunoko	TV
16	1993	YuYu Hakusho	Studio Pierrot	TV	5th	Sailor Moon	Toei Animation	TV
16	1993	YuYu Hakusho	Studio Pierrot	TV	6th	Victory Gundam	Sunrise	TV
16	1993	YuYu Hakusho	Studio Pierrot	TV	7th	Yadamon	Group TAC	TV
16	1993	YuYu Hakusho	Studio Pierrot	TV	8th	Southern Boy Papuwa	Nippon Animation	TV
17	1994	YuYu Hakusho	Studio Pierrot	TV	2nd	Sailor Moon S	Toei Animation	TV
17	1994	YuYu Hakusho	Studio Pierrot	TV	3rd	Akazukin Chacha	Studio Gallop	TV
17	1994	YuYu Hakusho	Studio Pierrot	TV	4th	Oh My Goddess!	AIC	OVA
17	1994	YuYu Hakusho	Studio Pierrot	TV	5th	Macross 7	Ashi Productions	TV
17	1994	YuYu Hakusho	Studio Pierrot	TV	6th	Magic Knight Rayearth	TMS Entertainment	TV
17	1994	YuYu Hakusho	Studio Pierrot	TV	7th	Blue Seed	Ashi Productions & Production I.G	TV
17	1994	YuYu Hakusho	Studio Pierrot	TV	8th	G Gundam	Sunrise	TV
18	1995	Neon Genesis Evangelion	Gainax & Tatsunoko	TV	2nd	Gundam Wing	Sunrise	TV
18	1995	Neon Genesis Evangelion	Gainax & Tatsunoko	TV	3rd	Magic Knight Rayearth 2	TMS Entertainment	TV
18	1995	Neon Genesis Evangelion	Gainax & Tatsunoko	TV	4th	Macross 7	Ashi Productions	TV
18	1995	Neon Genesis Evangelion	Gainax & Tatsunoko	TV	5th	YuYu Hakusho	Studio Pierrot	TV
18	1995	Neon Genesis Evangelion	Gainax & Tatsunoko	TV	6th	Romeo and the Black Brothers	Nippon Animation	TV
18	1995	Neon Genesis Evangelion	Gainax & Tatsunoko	TV	7th	Whisper of the Heart	Studio Ghibli	FF
18	1995	Neon Genesis Evangelion	Gainax & Tatsunoko	TV	8th	Slayers	E&G Films	TV
19	1996	Neon Genesis Evangelion	Gainax & Tatsunoko	TV	2nd	Slayers Next	E&G Films	TV
19	1996	Neon Genesis Evangelion	Gainax & Tatsunoko	TV	3rd	Martian Successor Nadesico	Xebec	TV
19	1996	Neon Genesis Evangelion	Gainax & Tatsunoko	TV	4th	Gundam Wing	Sunrise	TV
19	1996	Neon Genesis Evangelion	Gainax & Tatsunoko	TV	5th	Sailor Stars	Toei Animation	TV
19	1996	Neon Genesis Evangelion	Gainax & Tatsunoko	TV	6th	The Vision of Escaflowne	Sunrise	TV
19	1996	Neon Genesis Evangelion	Gainax & Tatsunoko	TV	7th	Gundam X	Sunrise	TV
19	1996	Neon Genesis Evangelion	Gainax & Tatsunoko	TV	8th	Saber Marionette J	Studio Junio	TV
20	1997	The End of Evangelion	Gainax & Production I.G	FF	2nd	Slayers Try	E&G Films	TV
20	1997	The End of Evangelion	Gainax & Production I.G	FF	3rd	Martian Successor Nadesico	Xebec	TV
20	1997	The End of Evangelion	Gainax & Production I.G	FF	4th	Revolutionary Girl Utena	J.C.Staff	TV
20	1997	The End of Evangelion	Gainax & Production I.G	FF	5th	Princess Mononoke	Studio Ghibli	FF
20	1997	The End of Evangelion	Gainax & Production I.G	FF	6th	Battle Athletes Victory	AIC	TV
20	1997	The End of Evangelion	Gainax & Production I.G	FF	7th	The Racing Brothers Let's & Go!! WGP	Xebec	TV
20	1997	The End of Evangelion	Gainax & Production I.G	FF	8th	The King of Braves GaoGaiGar	Sunrise	TV
21	1998	Nadesico: Prince of Darkness	Xebec	FF	2nd	Cowboy Bebop	Sunrise	TV
21	1998	Nadesico: Prince of Darkness	Xebec	FF	3rd	Lost Universe	E&G Films	TV
21	1998	Nadesico: Prince of Darkness	Xebec	FF	4th	Kare Kano	Gainax & J.C.Staff	TV
21	1998	Nadesico: Prince of Darkness	Xebec	FF	5th	Cardcaptor Sakura	Madhouse	TV
21	1998	Nadesico: Prince of Darkness	Xebec	FF	6th	Cyber Team in Akihabara	Ashi Productions	TV
21	1998	Nadesico: Prince of Darkness	Xebec	FF	7th	Trigun	Madhouse	TV
21	1998	Nadesico: Prince of Darkness	Xebec	FF	8th	Sorcerous Stabber Orphen	J.C.Staff	TV
22	1999	Cardcaptor Sakura	Madhouse	TV	2nd	Cowboy Bebop	Sunrise	TV
22	1999	Cardcaptor Sakura	Madhouse	TV	3rd	Infinite Ryvius	Sunrise	TV
22	1999	Cardcaptor Sakura	Madhouse	TV	4th	Cardcaptor Sakura: The Movie	Madhouse	FF
22	1999	Cardcaptor Sakura	Madhouse	TV	5th	Soul Hunter	Studio Deen	TV
22	1999	Cardcaptor Sakura	Madhouse	TV	6th	Ɐ Gundam	Sunrise	TV
22	1999	Cardcaptor Sakura	Madhouse	TV	7th	To Heart	OLM	TV
22	1999	Cardcaptor Sakura	Madhouse	TV	8th	Mamotte Shugogetten!	Toei Animation	TV
23	2000	Gensomaden Saiyuki	Studio Pierrot	TV	2nd	Cardcaptor Sakura	Madhouse	TV
23	2000	Gensomaden Saiyuki	Studio Pierrot	TV	3rd	Cardcaptor Sakura 2: The Sealed Card	Madhouse	FF
23	2000	Gensomaden Saiyuki	Studio Pierrot	TV	4th	Hunter × Hunter	Nippon Animation	TV
23	2000	Gensomaden Saiyuki	Studio Pierrot	TV	5th	Infinite Ryvius	Sunrise	TV
23	2000	Gensomaden Saiyuki	Studio Pierrot	TV	6th	Love Hina	Xebec	TV
23	2000	Gensomaden Saiyuki	Studio Pierrot	TV	7th	Ah! My Goddess Movie	AIC	FF
23	2000	Gensomaden Saiyuki	Studio Pierrot	TV	8th	One Piece	Toei Animation	TV

=== 21st Century ===
No.	Year	Winner (1st place)	Studio	Type	Runners Up (2nd–8th places)		Studio	Type
24	2001	Fruits Basket	Studio Deen	TV	2nd	Inu Yasha	Sunrise	TV
24	2001	Fruits Basket	Studio Deen	TV	3rd	Scryed	Sunrise	TV
24	2001	Fruits Basket	Studio Deen	TV	4th	Gensomaden Saiyuki	Studio Pierrot	TV
24	2001	Fruits Basket	Studio Deen	TV	5th	Sister Princess	Zexcs	TV
24	2001	Fruits Basket	Studio Deen	TV	6th	Shaman King	Xebec	TV
24	2001	Fruits Basket	Studio Deen	TV	7th	Spirited Away	Studio Ghibli	FF
24	2001	Fruits Basket	Studio Deen	TV	8th	Cowboy Bebop: Knockin' on Heaven's Door	Bones	FF
25	2002	Gundam SEED	Sunrise	TV	2nd	Azumanga Daioh	J.C.Staff	TV
25	2002	Gundam SEED	Sunrise	TV	3rd	Inuyasha	Sunrise	TV
25	2002	Gundam SEED	Sunrise	TV	4th	The Prince of Tennis	Trans Arts	TV
25	2002	Gundam SEED	Sunrise	TV	5th	Spiral: The Bonds of Reasoning	J.C.Staff	TV
25	2002	Gundam SEED	Sunrise	TV	6th	Shaman King	Xebec	TV
25	2002	Gundam SEED	Sunrise	TV	7th	One Piece	Toei Animation	TV
25	2002	Gundam SEED	Sunrise	TV	8th	GetBackers	Studio Deen	TV
26	2003	Fullmetal Alchemist	Bones	TV	2nd	Gundam SEED	Sunrise	TV
26	2003	Fullmetal Alchemist	Bones	TV	3rd	GetBackers	Studio Deen	TV
26	2003	Fullmetal Alchemist	Bones	TV	4th	Saiyuki Reload	Studio Pierrot	TV
26	2003	Fullmetal Alchemist	Bones	TV	5th	Stellvia	Xebec	TV
26	2003	Fullmetal Alchemist	Bones	TV	6th	Inuyasha	Sunrise	TV
26	2003	Fullmetal Alchemist	Bones	TV	7th	Da Capo	Zexcs	TV
26	2003	Fullmetal Alchemist	Bones	TV	8th	The Prince of Tennis	Trans Arts	TV
27	2004	Gundam SEED Destiny	Sunrise	TV	2nd	Fullmetal Alchemist	Bones	TV
27	2004	Gundam SEED Destiny	Sunrise	TV	3rd	Fafner in the Azure: Dead Aggressor	Xebec	TV
27	2004	Gundam SEED Destiny	Sunrise	TV	4th	Gundam SEED: Special Edition	Sunrise	TFS
27	2004	Gundam SEED Destiny	Sunrise	TV	5th	The Prince of Tennis	Trans Arts	TV
27	2004	Gundam SEED Destiny	Sunrise	TV	6th	Gankutsuou: The Count of Monte Cristo	Gonzo	TV
27	2004	Gundam SEED Destiny	Sunrise	TV	7th	Kyo Kara Maoh!	Studio Deen	TV
27	2004	Gundam SEED Destiny	Sunrise	TV	8th	My-Hime	Sunrise	TV
28	2005	Gundam SEED Destiny	Sunrise	TV	2nd	Kyo Kara Maoh!	Studio Deen	TV
28	2005	Gundam SEED Destiny	Sunrise	TV	3rd	Fullmetal Alchemist: Conqueror of Shamballa	Bones	FF
28	2005	Gundam SEED Destiny	Sunrise	TV	4th	Bleach	Studio Pierrot	TV
28	2005	Gundam SEED Destiny	Sunrise	TV	5th	Fafner in the Azure: Dead Aggressor	Xebec	TV
28	2005	Gundam SEED Destiny	Sunrise	TV	6th	Rozen Maiden: Träumend	Nomad	TV
28	2005	Gundam SEED Destiny	Sunrise	TV	7th	Eureka Seven	Bones	TV
28	2005	Gundam SEED Destiny	Sunrise	TV	8th	Tsubasa: Reservoir Chronicle	Bee Train	TV
29	2006	Code Geass	Sunrise	TV	2nd	Gundam SEED Destiny: Special Edition	Sunrise	TFS
29	2006	Code Geass	Sunrise	TV	3rd	The Melancholy of Haruhi Suzumiya	Kyoto Animation	TV
29	2006	Code Geass	Sunrise	TV	4th	Ouran High School Host Club	Bones	TV
29	2006	Code Geass	Sunrise	TV	5th	Gintama	Sunrise	TV
29	2006	Code Geass	Sunrise	TV	6th	Blood+	Production I.G	TV
29	2006	Code Geass	Sunrise	TV	7th	Bleach	Studio Pierrot	TV
29	2006	Code Geass	Sunrise	TV	8th	Rozen Maiden: Träumend	Nomad	TV
30	2007	Code Geass	Sunrise	TV	2nd	Gundam 00	Sunrise	TV
30	2007	Code Geass	Sunrise	TV	3rd	Lucky Star	Kyoto Animation	TV
30	2007	Code Geass	Sunrise	TV	4th	Gintama	Sunrise	TV
30	2007	Code Geass	Sunrise	TV	5th	Big Windup!	A-1 Pictures	TV
30	2007	Code Geass	Sunrise	TV	6th	Gundam SEED Destiny: Special Edition	Sunrise	TFS
30	2007	Code Geass	Sunrise	TV	7th	Reborn!	Artland	TV
30	2007	Code Geass	Sunrise	TV	8th	Evangelion: 1.0 You Are (Not) Alone	Khara	FF
31	2008	Code Geass R2	Sunrise	TV	2nd	Gundam 00	Sunrise	TV
31	2008	Code Geass R2	Sunrise	TV	3rd	Black Butler	A-1 Pictures	TV
31	2008	Code Geass R2	Sunrise	TV	4th	Macross Frontier	Satelight	TV
31	2008	Code Geass R2	Sunrise	TV	5th	Gintama	Sunrise	TV
31	2008	Code Geass R2	Sunrise	TV	6th	Reborn!	Artland	TV
31	2008	Code Geass R2	Sunrise	TV	7th	Natsume's Book of Friends	Brain's Base	TV
31	2008	Code Geass R2	Sunrise	TV	8th	D.Gray-Man	TMS Entertainment	TV
32	2009	K-On!	Kyoto Animation	TV	2nd	Gintama	Sunrise	TV
32	2009	K-On!	Kyoto Animation	TV	3rd	Gundam 00	Sunrise	TV
32	2009	K-On!	Kyoto Animation	TV	4th	Fullmetal Alchemist: Brotherhood	Bones	TV
32	2009	K-On!	Kyoto Animation	TV	5th	Sengoku Basara: Samurai Kings	Production I.G	TV
32	2009	K-On!	Kyoto Animation	TV	6th	Evangelion: 2.0 You Can (Not) Advance	Khara	FF
32	2009	K-On!	Kyoto Animation	TV	7th	Monogatari	Shaft	TV
32	2009	K-On!	Kyoto Animation	TV	8th	Macross Frontier: The False Songstress	Satelight	FF
33	2010	Inazuma Eleven	OLM	TV	2nd	Durarara!!	Brain's Base	TV
33	2010	Inazuma Eleven	OLM	TV	3rd	K-On!!	Kyoto Animation	TV
33	2010	Inazuma Eleven	OLM	TV	4th	Sengoku Basara: Samurai Kings	Production I.G	TV
33	2010	Inazuma Eleven	OLM	TV	5th	Angel Beats!	P.A. Works	TV
33	2010	Inazuma Eleven	OLM	TV	6th	Gintama	Sunrise	TV
33	2010	Inazuma Eleven	OLM	TV	7th	Hakuoki: Record of the Jade Blood	Studio Deen	TV
33	2010	Inazuma Eleven	OLM	TV	8th	Black Butler 2	A-1 Pictures	TV
34	2011	Inazuma Eleven GO	OLM	TV	2nd	Inazuma Eleven	OLM	TV
34	2011	Inazuma Eleven GO	OLM	TV	3rd	Uta no Prince-sama: Maji Love 1000%	A-1 Pictures	TV
34	2011	Inazuma Eleven GO	OLM	TV	4th	Blue Exorcist	A-1 Pictures	TV
34	2011	Inazuma Eleven GO	OLM	TV	5th	Tiger & Bunny	Sunrise	TV
34	2011	Inazuma Eleven GO	OLM	TV	6th	Gintama'	Sunrise	TV
34	2011	Inazuma Eleven GO	OLM	TV	7th	Puella Magi Madoka Magica	Shaft	TV
34	2011	Inazuma Eleven GO	OLM	TV	8th	Anohana	A-1 Pictures	TV
35	2012	Inazuma Eleven GO 2: Chrono Stone	OLM	TV	2nd	Kuroko's Basketball	Production I.G	TV
35	2012	Inazuma Eleven GO 2: Chrono Stone	OLM	TV	3rd	Inazuma Eleven GO	OLM	TV
35	2012	Inazuma Eleven GO 2: Chrono Stone	OLM	TV	4th	Magi: The Labyrinth of Magic	A-1 Pictures	TV
35	2012	Inazuma Eleven GO 2: Chrono Stone	OLM	TV	5th	K	GoHands	TV
35	2012	Inazuma Eleven GO 2: Chrono Stone	OLM	TV	6th	K-On the Movie!	Kyoto Animation	TV
35	2012	Inazuma Eleven GO 2: Chrono Stone	OLM	TV	7th	Gintama'	Sunrise	TV
35	2012	Inazuma Eleven GO 2: Chrono Stone	OLM	TV	8th	Sword Art Online	A-1 Pictures	TV
36	2013	Attack on Titan	Wit Studio	TV	2nd	Inazuma Eleven GO 3: Galaxy	OLM	TV
36	2013	Attack on Titan	Wit Studio	TV	3rd	Inazuma Eleven GO 2: Chrono Stone	OLM	TV
36	2013	Attack on Titan	Wit Studio	TV	4th	Free! Iwatobi Swim Club	Kyoto Animation	TV
36	2013	Attack on Titan	Wit Studio	TV	5th	Kuroko's Basketball	Production I.G	TV
36	2013	Attack on Titan	Wit Studio	TV	6th	Uta no Prince-sama: Maji Love 2000%	A-1 Pictures	TV
36	2013	Attack on Titan	Wit Studio	TV	7th	LBX Wars	OLM	TV
36	2013	Attack on Titan	Wit Studio	TV	8th	Puella Magi Madoka Magica: Rebellion	Shaft	FF
37	2014	Free! Eternal Summer	Kyoto Animation	TV	2nd	Uta no Prince-sama: Maji Love 2000%	A-1 Pictures	TV
37	2014	Free! Eternal Summer	Kyoto Animation	TV	3rd	Kuroko's Basketball	Production I.G	TV
37	2014	Free! Eternal Summer	Kyoto Animation	TV	4th	The Seven Deadly Sins	A-1 Pictures	TV
37	2014	Free! Eternal Summer	Kyoto Animation	TV	5th	Haikyu!!	Production I.G	TV
37	2014	Free! Eternal Summer	Kyoto Animation	TV	6th	Yowamushi Pedal	TMS Entertainment	TV
37	2014	Free! Eternal Summer	Kyoto Animation	TV	7th	Yona of the Dawn	Studio Pierrot	TV
37	2014	Free! Eternal Summer	Kyoto Animation	TV	8th	Gintama: Be Forever Yorozuya	Sunrise	FF
38	2015	Mr. Osomatsu	Studio Pierrot	TV	2nd	Gintama°	Bandai Namco Pictures	TV
38	2015	Mr. Osomatsu	Studio Pierrot	TV	3rd	Haikyu!!	Production I.G	TV
38	2015	Mr. Osomatsu	Studio Pierrot	TV	4th	Gundam: Iron-Blooded Orphans	Sunrise	TV
38	2015	Mr. Osomatsu	Studio Pierrot	TV	5th	King of Prism by Pretty Rhythm	Tatsunoko	FF
38	2015	Mr. Osomatsu	Studio Pierrot	TV	6th	Prism Paradise	Tatsunoko	TV
38	2015	Mr. Osomatsu	Studio Pierrot	TV	7th	Go! Princess Pretty Cure	Toei Animation	TV
38	2015	Mr. Osomatsu	Studio Pierrot	TV	8th	Uta no Prince-sama: Maji Love Revolution	A-1 Pictures	TV
39	2016	Gundam: Iron-Blooded Orphans	Sunrise	TV	2nd	Yuri on Ice	MAPPA	TV
39	2016	Gundam: Iron-Blooded Orphans	Sunrise	TV	3rd	Gintama°	Bandai Namco Pictures	TV
39	2016	Gundam: Iron-Blooded Orphans	Sunrise	TV	4th	Bungo Stray Dogs	Bones	TV
39	2016	Gundam: Iron-Blooded Orphans	Sunrise	TV	5th	Prism Paradise	Tatsunoko	TV
39	2016	Gundam: Iron-Blooded Orphans	Sunrise	TV	6th	Kuroko's Basketball: The Last Game	Production I.G	FF
39	2016	Gundam: Iron-Blooded Orphans	Sunrise	TV	7th	Witchy Pretty Cure	Toei Animation	TV
39	2016	Gundam: Iron-Blooded Orphans	Sunrise	TV	8th	Uta no Prince-sama: Maji Love Legend Star	A-1 Pictures	TV
40	2017	Idolish 7	Troyca	TV	2nd	Mr. Osomatsu	Studio Pierrot	TV
40	2017	Idolish 7	Troyca	TV	3rd	Case Closed: The Crimson Love Letter	TMS Entertainment	FF
40	2017	Idolish 7	Troyca	TV	4th	Gintama.	Bandai Namco Pictures	TV
40	2017	Idolish 7	Troyca	TV	5th	Pop Team Epic	Kamikaze Douga	TV
40	2017	Idolish 7	Troyca	TV	6th	Idol Time PriPara	Tatsunoko	TV
40	2017	Idolish 7	Troyca	TV	7th	Cardcaptor Sakura: Clear Card	Madhouse	TV
40	2017	Idolish 7	Troyca	TV	8th	Katsugeki: Touken Ranbu	Ufotable	TV
41	2018	Case Closed: Zero the Enforcer	TMS Entertainment	FF	2nd	Idolish 7 Vibrato	Troyca	ONA
41	2018	Case Closed: Zero the Enforcer	TMS Entertainment	FF	3rd	Banana Fish	MAPPA	TV
41	2018	Case Closed: Zero the Enforcer	TMS Entertainment	FF	4th	The Promised Neverland	CloverWorks	TV
41	2018	Case Closed: Zero the Enforcer	TMS Entertainment	FF	5th	Inazuma Eleven: Ares	OLM	TV
41	2018	Case Closed: Zero the Enforcer	TMS Entertainment	FF	6th	JoJo's Bizarre Adventure: Golden Wind	David Production	TV
41	2018	Case Closed: Zero the Enforcer	TMS Entertainment	FF	7th	Mr. Osomatsu: The Movie	Studio Pierrot	TV
41	2018	Case Closed: Zero the Enforcer	TMS Entertainment	FF	8th	Mob Psycho 100	Bones	TV
42	2019	Demon Slayer: Kimetsu no Yaiba	Ufotable	TV	2nd	Case Closed: The Fist of Blue Sapphire	TMS Entertainment	FF
42	2019	Demon Slayer: Kimetsu no Yaiba	Ufotable	TV	3rd	Star Twinkle Pretty Cure	Toei Animation	TV
42	2019	Demon Slayer: Kimetsu no Yaiba	Ufotable	TV	4th	Violet Evergarden: Eternity and the Auto Memory Doll	Kyoto Animation	FF
42	2019	Demon Slayer: Kimetsu no Yaiba	Ufotable	TV	5th	Ensemble Stars!	David Production	TV
42	2019	Demon Slayer: Kimetsu no Yaiba	Ufotable	TV	6th	GeGeGe no Kitaro	Toei Animation	TV
42	2019	Demon Slayer: Kimetsu no Yaiba	Ufotable	TV	7th	If My Favorite Pop Idol Made It to the Budokan, I Would Die	Eight Bit	TV
42	2019	Demon Slayer: Kimetsu no Yaiba	Ufotable	TV	8th	My Hero Academia	Bones	TV
43	2020	Healin' Good Pretty Cure	Toei Animation	TV	2nd	Demon Slayer: Kimetsu no Yaiba – Mugen Train	Ufotable	FF
43	2020	Healin' Good Pretty Cure	Toei Animation	TV	3rd	Jujutsu Kaisen	MAPPA	TV
43	2020	Healin' Good Pretty Cure	Toei Animation	TV	4th	Hypnosis Mic: Rhyme Anima	A-1 Pictures	TV
43	2020	Healin' Good Pretty Cure	Toei Animation	TV	5th	The Millionaire Detective's Balance: Unlimited	CloverWorks	TV
43	2020	Healin' Good Pretty Cure	Toei Animation	TV	6th	Gintama: The Very Final	Bandai Namco Pictures	FF
43	2020	Healin' Good Pretty Cure	Toei Animation	TV	7th	Case Closed	TMS Entertainment	TV
43	2020	Healin' Good Pretty Cure	Toei Animation	TV	8th	SK8 the Infinity	Bones	TV
44	2021	Jujutsu Kaisen 0	MAPPA	FF	2nd	Demon Slayer: Kimetsu no Yaiba	Ufotable	TV
44	2021	Jujutsu Kaisen 0	MAPPA	FF	3rd	Tropical Rouge Pretty Cure	Toei Animation	TV
44	2021	Jujutsu Kaisen 0	MAPPA	FF	4th	Case Closed: The Scarlet Bullet	TMS Entertainment	FF
44	2021	Jujutsu Kaisen 0	MAPPA	FF	5th	Yashahime	Sunrise	TV
44	2021	Jujutsu Kaisen 0	MAPPA	FF	6th	The Vampire Dies in No Time	Madhouse	TV
44	2021	Jujutsu Kaisen 0	MAPPA	FF	7th	Pokémon	OLM	TV
44	2021	Jujutsu Kaisen 0	MAPPA	FF	8th	Waccha PriMagi!	Tatsunoko	TV
45	2022	Demon Slayer: Kimetsu no Yaiba	Ufotable	TV	2nd	The Vampire Dies in No Time	Madhouse	TV
45	2022	Demon Slayer: Kimetsu no Yaiba	Ufotable	TV	3rd	Spy × Family	Wit Studio & CloverWorks	TV
45	2022	Demon Slayer: Kimetsu no Yaiba	Ufotable	TV	4th	Delicious Party Pretty Cure	Toei Animation	TV
45	2022	Demon Slayer: Kimetsu no Yaiba	Ufotable	TV	5th	Gundam: The Witch from Mercury	Sunrise	TV
45	2022	Demon Slayer: Kimetsu no Yaiba	Ufotable	TV	6th	Blue Lock	Eight Bit	TV
45	2022	Demon Slayer: Kimetsu no Yaiba	Ufotable	TV	7th	Pokémon	OLM	TV
45	2022	Demon Slayer: Kimetsu no Yaiba	Ufotable	TV	8th	Idolish 7 Third Beat!	Troyca	TV
46	2023	Birth of Kitaro: The Mystery of GeGeGe	Toei Animation	FF	2nd	Brave Bang Bravern!	Cygames Pictures	TV
46	2023	Birth of Kitaro: The Mystery of GeGeGe	Toei Animation	FF	3rd	Soaring Sky Pretty Cure	Toei Animation	TV
46	2023	Birth of Kitaro: The Mystery of GeGeGe	Toei Animation	FF	4th	Frieren: Beyond Journey's End	Madhouse	TV
46	2023	Birth of Kitaro: The Mystery of GeGeGe	Toei Animation	FF	5th	The Apothecary Diaries	Toho Animation Studio & OLM	TV
46	2023	Birth of Kitaro: The Mystery of GeGeGe	Toei Animation	FF	6th	Jujutsu Kaisen	MAPPA	TV
46	2023	Birth of Kitaro: The Mystery of GeGeGe	Toei Animation	FF	7th	Gundam SEED Freedom	Sunrise	FF
46	2023	Birth of Kitaro: The Mystery of GeGeGe	Toei Animation	FF	8th	Demon Slayer: Kimetsu no Yaiba	Ufotable	TV
47	2024	The Apothecary Diaries	Toho Animation Studio & OLM	TV	2nd	Nintama Rantaro: Invincible Master of the Dokutake Ninja Squad	Ajiado	FF
47	2024	The Apothecary Diaries	Toho Animation Studio & OLM	TV	3rd	Orb: On the Movements of the Earth	Madhouse	TV
47	2024	The Apothecary Diaries	Toho Animation Studio & OLM	TV	4th	Birth of Kitaro: The Mystery of GeGeGe (Note: True Birth Edition.)	Toei Animation	FF
47	2024	The Apothecary Diaries	Toho Animation Studio & OLM	TV	5th	Demon Slayer: Kimetsu no Yaiba	Ufotable	TV
47	2024	The Apothecary Diaries	Toho Animation Studio & OLM	TV	6th	Case Closed: The Million-Dollar Signpost	TMS Entertainment	FF
47	2024	The Apothecary Diaries	Toho Animation Studio & OLM	TV	7th	BanG Dream! Ave Mujica	Sanzigen	TV
47	2024	The Apothecary Diaries	Toho Animation Studio & OLM	TV	8th	Oshi no Ko	Doga Kobo	TV
48	2025	Jujutsu Kaisen	MAPPA	TV	2nd	You and Idol Pretty Cure	Toei Animation	TV
48	2025	Jujutsu Kaisen	MAPPA	TV	3rd	Demon Slayer: Kimetsu no Yaiba – Infinity Castle	Ufotable	FF
48	2025	Jujutsu Kaisen	MAPPA	TV	4th	Mobile Suit Gundam GQuuuuuuX	Studio Khara and Sunrise	TV
48	2025	Jujutsu Kaisen	MAPPA	TV	5th	Frieren: Beyond Journey's End	Madhouse	TV
48	2025	Jujutsu Kaisen	MAPPA	TV	6th	Himitsu no AiPri	OLM and DongWoo A&E	TV
48	2025	Jujutsu Kaisen	MAPPA	TV	7th	Star Detective Precure!	Toei Animation	TV
48	2025	Jujutsu Kaisen	MAPPA	TV	8th	Case Closed: One-Eyed Flashback	TMS Entertainment	FF

== Best Character ==
=== 1979–1982 ===
No.	Year	Character		
No.	Year	1st	2nd	3rd
1	1979	Captain Harlock from Space Pirate Captain Harlock (VA: Makio Inoue)	Amuro Ray from Mobile Suit Gundam (VA: Tōru Furuya)	Char Aznable (Note: Both Char Aznable and Quattro Bajeena are alias of Casval Rem Deikun.) from Mobile Suit Gundam (VA: Shūichi Ikeda)
2	1980 (1st half)	Char Aznable from Mobile Suit Gundam (VA: Shūichi Ikeda)	Amuro Ray from Mobile Suit Gundam (VA: Tōru Furuya)	Captain Harlock from Space Pirate Captain Harlock (VA: Makio Inoue)
3	1980 (2nd half)	Joe Shimamura from Cyborg 009 (VA: Kazuhiko Inoue)	Susumu Kodai from Be Forever Yamato (VA: Kei Tomiyama)	Arsène Lupin III from Lupin III Part 2 (VA: Yasuo Yamada)
4	1981	Takeru Myoujin from Six God Combination Godmars (VA: Yū Mizushima)	Lum from Urusei Yatsura (VA: Fumi Hirano)	Leonardo Medici Bundle from Warring Demon God GoShogun (VA: Kaneto Shiozawa)
5	1982	Takeru Myoujin from Six God Combination Godmars (VA: Yū Mizushima)	Marg from Six God Combination Godmars (VA: Yūji Mitsuya)	Lynn Minmay from Super Dimension Fortress Macross (VA: Mari Iijima)

=== 1983–2021 ===
==== Male character ====
No.	Year	Character		
No.	Year	1st	2nd	3rd
6	1983	Chirico Cuvie from Armored Trooper Votoms (VA: Hozumi Gōda)	Joe from Crusher Joe (VA: Hiroshi Takemura)	Ryu Urashima from Future Policeman Urashiman (VA: Michitaka Kobayashi)
7	1984	Daba Myroad from Heavy Metal L-Gaim (VA: Hirokazu Hiramatsu)	Ataru Moroboshi from Urusei Yatsura (VA: Toshio Furukawa)	Sherlock Hound from Sherlock Hound (VA: Taichirō Hirokawa)
8	1985	Tatsuya Uesugi from Touch (VA: Yūji Mitsuya)	Quattro Bajeena from Zeta Gundam (VA: Shūichi Ikeda)	Shinobu Fujiwara from Super Beast Machine God Dancouga (VA: Kazuki Yao)
9	1986	Kamille Bidan from Zeta Gundam (VA: Nobuo Tobita)	Pazu from Castle in the Sky (VA: Mayumi Tanaka)	Judau Ashta from Gundam ZZ (VA: Kazuki Yao)
10	1987	J.J. from Red Photon Zillion (VA: Toshihiko Seki)	Ryo Saeba from City Hunter (VA: Akira Kamiya)	Dragon Shiryu from Saint Seiya (VA: Hirotaka Suzuoki)
11	1988	Ryo Saeba from City Hunter 2 (VA: Akira Kamiya)	Son Goku from Dragon Ball (VA: Masako Nozawa)	Ryo Hibiki from Sonic Soldier Borgman (VA: Yasunori Matsumoto)
12	1989	Ryo Saeba from City Hunter 2 (VA: Akira Kamiya)	Ranma Saotome from Ranma ½ (VA: Kappei Yamaguchi and Megumi Hayashibara)	Ravi from Madö King Granzört (VA: Shinobu Adachi)
13	1990	Ryo Saeba from City Hunter 3 (VA: Akira Kamiya)	Ranma Saotome from Ranma ½ (VA: Kappei Yamaguchi and Megumi Hayashibara)	Son Goku from Dragon Ball Z (VA: Masako Nozawa)
14	1991	Hayato Kazami from Future GPX Cyber Formula (VA: Jun'ichi Kanemaru)	Bleed Kaga from Future GPX Cyber Formula (VA: Toshihiko Seki)	Ranma Saotome from Ranma ½ (VA: Kappei Yamaguchi and Megumi Hayashibara)
15	1992	Hiei from YuYu Hakusho (VA: Nobuyuki Hiyama)	Ranma Saotome from Ranma ½ (VA: Kappei Yamaguchi and Megumi Hayashibara)	Kurama from Yu Yu Hakusho (VA: Megumi Ogata)
16	1993	Kurama from YuYu Hakusho (VA: Megumi Ogata)	Hiei from Yu Yu Hakusho (VA: Nobuyuki Hiyama)	Justy Ueki Tylor from The Irresponsible Captain Tylor (VA: Kōji Tsujitani)
17	1994	Kurama from YuYu Hakusho (VA: Megumi Ogata)	Basara Nekki from Macross 7 (VA: Nobutoshi Canna and Yoshiki Fukuyama (Note: Singing voice))	Hiei from Yu Yu Hakusho (VA: Nobuyuki Hiyama)
18	1995	Duo Maxwell from Gundam Wing (VA: Toshihiko Seki)	Shinji Ikari from Neon Genesis Evangelion (VA: Megumi Ogata)	Heero Yuy from Gundam Wing (VA: Hikaru Midorikawa)
19	1996	Shinji Ikari from Neon Genesis Evangelion (VA: Megumi Ogata)	Kaworu Nagisa from Neon Genesis Evangelion (VA: Akira Ishida)	Duo Maxwell from Gundam Wing (VA: Toshihiko Seki)
20	1997	Shinji Ikari from The End of Evangelion (VA: Megumi Ogata)	Xellos from Slayers Try (VA: Akira Ishida)	Ashitaka from Princess Mononoke (VA: Yōji Matsuda)
21	1998	Spike Spiegel from Cowboy Bebop (VA: Kōichi Yamadera)	Orphen from Sorcerous Stabber Orphen (VA: Showtaro Morikubo)	Akito Tenkawa from Martian Successor Nadesico (VA: Yūji Ueda)
22	1999	Spike Spiegel from Cowboy Bebop (VA: Kōichi Yamadera)	Orphen from Sorcerous Stabber Orphen (VA: Showtaro Morikubo)	Syaoran Li from Cardcaptor Sakura (VA: Motoko Kumai)
23	2000	Genjo Sanzo from Gensomaden Saiyuki (VA: Toshihiko Seki)	Syaoran Li from Cardcaptor Sakura 2: The Sealed Card (VA: Motoko Kumai)	Kurapika from Hunter x Hunter (VA: Yuki Kaida)
24	2001	Inuyasha from Inu Yasha (VA: Kappei Yamaguchi)	Kazuma from Scryed (VA: Sōichirō Hoshi)	Genjo Sanzo from Gensomaden Saiyuki (VA: Toshihiko Seki)
25	2002	Kira Yamato from Gundam SEED (VA: Sōichirō Hoshi)	Athrun Zala from Gundam SEED (VA: Akira Ishida)	Inu Yasha from Inu Yasha (VA: Kappei Yamaguchi)
26	2003	Edward Elric from Fullmetal Alchemist (VA: Romi Park)	Kira Yamato from Gundam SEED (VA: Sōichirō Hoshi)	Roy Mustang from Fullmetal Alchemist (VA: Tōru Ōkawa)
27	2004	Athrun Zala from Gundam SEED: Special Edition (VA: Akira Ishida)	Kira Yamato; Gundam SEED: Special Edition (VA: Sōichirō Hoshi)	Edward Elric from Fullmetal Alchemist (VA: Romi Park)
28	2005	Kira Yamato from Gundam SEED Destiny (VA: Sōichirō Hoshi)	Athrun Zala from Gundam SEED Destiny (VA: Akira Ishida)	Yuri Shibuya from Kyo Kara Maoh! (VA: Takahiro Sakurai)
29	2006	Lelouch Vi Britannia from Code Geass (VA: Jun Fukuyama)	Kira Yamato from Gundam SEED Destiny: Special Edition (VA: Sōichirō Hoshi)	Athrun Zala from Gundam SEED Destiny: Special Edition (VA: Akira Ishida)
30	2007	Lelouch Vi Britannia from Code Geass (VA: Jun Fukuyama)	Setsuna F. Seiei from Gundam 00 (VA: Mamoru Miyano)	Kira Yamato from Gundam SEED Destiny: Special Edition (VA: Sōichirō Hoshi)
31	2008	Lelouch Vi Britannia from Code Geass R2 (VA: Jun Fukuyama)	Sebastian Michaelis from Black Butler (VA: Toshiyuki Morikawa)	Lockon Stratos from Gundam 00 (VA: Shin'ichirō Miki)
32	2009	Gintoki Sakata from Gintama (VA: Tomokazu Sugita)	Edward Elric from Fullmetal Alchemist: Brotherhood (VA: Romi Park)	Kyon from The Melancholy of Haruhi Suzumiya (VA: Tomokazu Sugita)
33	2010	Ichirota Kazemaru from Inazuma Eleven (VA: Yuka Nishigaki)	Izaya Orihara from Durarara!! (VA: Hiroshi Kamiya)	Shirō Fubuki from Inazuma Eleven (VA: Mamoru Miyano)
34	2011	Ranmaru Kirino from Inazuma Eleven GO (VA: Yū Kobayashi)	Kariya Masaki from Inazuma Eleven GO (VA: Yūki Tai)	Ichirota Kazemaru from Inazuma Eleven (VA: Yuka Nishigaki)
35	2012	Ranmaru Kirino from Inazuma Eleven GO 2: Chrono Stone (VA: Yū Kobayashi)	Tetsuya Kuroko from Kuroko's Basketball (VA: Kenshō Ono)	Kyosuke Tsurugi from Inazuma Eleven GO 2: Chrono Stone (VA: Takashi Ōhara)
36	2013	Levi Ackerman from Attack on Titan (VA: Hiroshi Kamiya)	Ranmaru Kirino from Inazuma Eleven GO 2: Chrono Stone (VA: Yū Kobayashi)	Makoto Tachibana from Free! Iwatobi Swin Club (VA: Tatsuhisa Suzuki)
37	2014	Makoto Tachibana from Free! Eternal Summer (VA: Tatsuhisa Suzuki)	Kazunari Takao from Kuroko's Basketball (VA: Tatsuhisa Suzuki)	Ban from The Seven Deadly Sins (VA: Tatsuhisa Suzuki)
38	2015	Karamatsu Matsuno from Mr. Osomatsu (VA: Yuichi Nakamura)	Ichimatsu Matsuno from Mr. Osomatsu (VA: Jun Fukuyama)	Gintoki Sakata from Gintama° (VA: Tomokazu Sugita)
39	2016	Victor Nikiforov from Yuri on Ice (VA: Junichi Suwabe)	Mikazuki Augus from Gundam: Iron-Blooded Orphans (VA: Kengo Kawanishi)	Gintoki Sakata from Gintama° (VA: Tomokazu Sugita)
40	2017	Ten Kujou from Idolish 7 (VA: Sōma Saitō)	Riku Nanase from Idolish 7 (VA: Kenshō Ono)	Sogo Osaka from Idolish 7 (VA: Atsushi Abe)
41	2018	Toru Amuro from Case Closed: Zero the Enforcer (VA: Tōru Furuya)	Ash Lynx from Banana Fish (VA: Yuma Uchida)	Ten Kujou from Idolish 7 (VA: Sōma Saitō)
42	2019	Tanjiro Kamado from Demon Slayer: Kimetsu no Yaiba (VA: Natsuki Hanae)	Giyu Tomioka from Demon Slayer: Kimetsu no Yaiba (VA: Takahiro Sakurai)	Conan Edogawa from Case Closed (VA: Minami Takayama)
43	2020	Kyojuro Rengoku from Demon Slayer: Kimetsu no Yaiba – Mugen Train (VA: Satoshi Hino)	Satoru Gojo from Jujutsu Kaisen (VA: Yūichi Nakamura)	Daisuke Kambe from The Millionaire Detective's Balance: Unlimited (VA: Yūsuke Ōnuki)
44	2021	Tengen Uzui from Demon Slayer: Kimetsu no Yaiba (VA: Katsuyuki Konishi)	Yuta Okkotsu from Jujutsu Kaisen 0 (VA: Megumi Ogata)	Satoru Gojo from Jujutsu Kaisen (VA: Yūichi Nakamura)

==== Female character ====
No.	Year	Character		
No.	Year	1st	2nd	3rd
6	1983	Misa Hayase from Super Dimension Fortress Macross (VA: Mika Doi)	Lum from Urusei Yatsura (VA: Fumi Hirano)	Minky Momo from Magical Princess Minky Momo (VA: Mami Koyama)
7	1984	Nausicaä from Nausicaä of the Valley of the Wind (VA: Sumi Shimamoto)	Gaw Ha Leccee from Heavy Metal L-Gaim (VA: Maria Kawamura)	Lum from Urusei Yatsura (VA: Fumi Hirano)
8	1985	Four Murasame from Zeta Gundam (VA: Saeko Shimazu)	Yuri from Dirty Pair (VA: Saeko Shimazu)	Lum from Urusei Yatsura (VA: Fumi Hirano)
9	1986	Elpeo Ple from Gundam ZZ (VA: Chieko Honda)	Sheeta from Castle in the Sky (VA: Keiko Yokozawa)	Kyoko Otonashi from Maison Ikkoku (VA: Sumi Shimamoto)
10	1987	Madoka Ayukawa from Kimagure Orange Road (VA: Hiromi Tsuru)	Kyoko Otonashi from Maison Ikkoku (VA: Sumi Shimamoto)	Apple from Red Photon Zillion (VA: Yūko Mizutani)
11	1988	Anise Farm from Sonic Soldier Borgman (VA: Yoshino Takamori)	Kyoko Otonashi from Maison Ikkoku (VA: Sumi Shimamoto)	Aramis from The Three Musketeers (VA: Eiko Yamada)
12	1989	Kiki from Kiki's Delivery Service (VA: Minami Takayama)	Noa Izumi from Patlabor (VA: Miina Tominaga)	Renge from Legend of Heavenly Sphere Shurato (VA: Megumi Hayashibara)
13	1990	Nadia from Nadia and the Secret of Blue Water (VA: Yoshino Takamori)	Himiko Shinobibe from Mashin Hero Wataru 2 (VA: Megumi Hayashibara)	Noa Izumi from Patlabor: The Mobile Police (VA: Miina Tominaga)
14	1991	Nadia from Nadia and the Secret of Blue Water (VA: Yoshino Takamori)	Asuka Sugo from Future GPX Cyber Formula (VA: Kotono Mitsuishi)	Miki Jonouchi from Future GPX Cyber Formula (VA: Shinobu Adachi)
15	1992	Ami Mizuno from Sailor Moon (VA: Aya Hisakawa)	Usagi Tsukino from Sailor Moon (VA: Kotono Mitsuishi)	Minky Momo from Minky Momo: Hold on to Your Dreams (VA: Megumi Hayashibara)
16	1993	Belldandy from Oh My Goddess! (VA: Kikuko Inoue)	Ami Mizuno from Sailor Moon R (VA: Aya Hisakawa)	Yadamon from Yadamon (VA: Mika Kanai)
17	1994	Haruka Tenoh from Sailor Moon S (VA: Megumi Ogata)	Belldandy from Oh My Goddess! (VA: Kikuko Inoue)	Mylene Flare Jenius from Macross 7 (VA: Tomo Sakurai and Chie Kajiura)
18	1995	Rei Ayanami from Neon Genesis Evangelion (VA: Megumi Hayashibara)	Hikaru Shidou from Magic Knight Rayearth 2 (VA: Hekiru Shiina)	Asuka Langley Soryu from Neon Genesis Evangelion (VA: Yūko Miyamura)
19	1996	Rei Ayanami from Neon Genesis Evangelion (VA: Megumi Hayashibara)	Lina Inverse from Slayers Next (VA: Megumi Hayashibara)	Ruri Hoshino from Martian Successor Nadesico (VA: Omi Minami)
20	1997	Lina Inverse from Slayers Try (VA: Megumi Hayashibara)	Ruri Hoshino from Martian Successor Nadesico (VA: Omi Minami)	Utena Tenjou from Revolutionary Girl Utena (VA: Tomoko Kawakami)
21	1998	Ruri Hoshino from Nadesico: Prince of Darkness (VA: Omi Minami)	Sakura Kinomoto from Cardcaptor Sakura (VA: Sakura Tange)	Canal Volfield from Lost Universe (VA: Megumi Hayashibara)
22	1999	Sakura Kinomoto from Cardcaptor Sakura (VA: Sakura Tange)	Shao Lin from Denshin Mamotte Shugogetten! (VA: Mariko Kōda)	Akari Kamigishi from To Heart (VA: Ayako Kawasumi)
23	2000	Sakura Kinomoto from Cardcaptor Sakura 2: The Sealed Card (VA: Sakura Tange)	Belldandy from Ah! My Goddess Movie (VA: Kikuko Inoue)	Naru Narusegawa from Love Hina (VA: Yui Horie)
24	2001	Tohru Honda from Fruits Basket (VA: Yui Horie)	Kagome Higurashi from Inuyasha (VA: Satsuki Yukino)	Anna Kyoyama from Shaman King (VA: Megumi Hayashibara)
25	2002	Lacus Clyne from Gundam SEED (VA: Rie Tanaka)	Cagalli Yula Athha from Gundam SEED (VA: Naomi Shindō)	Tohru Honda from Fruits Basket (VA: Yui Horie)
26	2003	Riza Hawkeye from Fullmetal Alchemist (VA: Michiko Neya)	Lacus Clyne from Gundam SEED (VA: Rie Tanaka)	Winry Rockbell from Fullmetal Alchemist (VA: Megumi Toyoguchi)
27	2004	Lacus Clyne from Gundam SEED: Special Edition (VA: Rie Tanaka)	Cagalli Yula Athha from Gundam SEED: Special Edition (VA: Naomi Shindō)	Riza Hawkeye from Fullmetal Alchemist (VA: Michiko Neya)
28	2005	Lacus Clyne from Gundam SEED Destiny (VA: Rie Tanaka)	Cagalli Yula Athha from Gundam SEED Destiny (VA: Naomi Shindō)	Stella Loussier from Gundam SEED Destiny (VA: Hōko Kuwashima)
29	2006	Lacus Clyne from Gundam SEED Destiny: Special Edition (VA: Rie Tanaka)	Haruhi Suzumiya from The Melancholy of Haruhi Suzumiya (VA: Aya Hirano)	C.C. from Code Geass (VA: Yukana)
30	2007	C.C. from Code Geass (VA: Yukana)	Konata Izumi from Lucky Star (VA: Aya Hirano)	Lacus Clyne from Gundam SEED Destiny: Special Edition (VA: Rie Tanaka)
31	2008	C.C. from Code Geass R2; Yukana	Sheryl Nome from Macross Frontier (VA: Aya Endō and May'n)	Ranka Lee from Macross Frontier (VA: Megumi Nakajima)
32	2009	Yui Hirasawa from K-On! (VA: Aki Toyosaki)	Mio Akiyama from K-On! (VA: Yōko Hikasa)	Sheryl Nome from Macross Frontier: The False Songstress (VA: Aya Endō and May'n)
33	2010	Yui Hirasawa from K-On!! (VA: Aki Toyosaki)	Haruna Otonashi from Inazuma Eleven (VA: Hinako Sasaki)	Azusa Nakano; K-On!! (VA: Ayana Taketatsu)
34	2011	Haruna Otonashi from Inazuma Eleven (VA: Hinako Sasaki)	Midori Seto from Inazuma Eleven GO (VA: Mina Kasai)	Aoi Sorano; Inazuma Eleven GO (VA: Sayaka Kitahara)
35	2012	Kinako Nanobana from Inazuma Eleven GO 2: Chrono Stone (VA: Aoi Yūki)	Morgiana from Magi: The Labyrinth of Magic (VA: Haruka Tomatsu)	Beta from Inazuma Eleven GO 2: Chrono Stone (VA: Mariya Ise)
36	2013	Kinako Nanobana from Inazuma Eleven GO 2: Chrono Stone (VA: Aoi Yūki)	Mikasa Ackerman from Attack on Titan (VA: Kiko Mizuhara)	Morgiana from Magi: The Kingdom of Magic (VA: Haruka Tomatsu)
37	2014	Diane from The Seven Deadly Sins (VA: Aoi Yūki)	Haruka Nanami from Uta no Prince-sama: Maji Love 2000% (VA: Miyuki Sawashiro)	Yona from Yona of the Dawn (VA: Chiwa Saitō)
38	2015	Kagura from Gintama° (VA: Rie Kugimiya)	Totoko from Mr. Osomatsu (VA: Aya Endō)	Hibike Shikyoin from Prism Paradise (VA: Mitsuki Saiga)
39	2016	Kagura from Gintama° (VA: Rie Kugimiya)	Kudelia Aina Bernstein from Gundam: Iron-Blooded Orphans (VA: Yuka Terasaki)	Hibike Shikyoin from Prism Paradise (VA: Mitsuki Saiga)
40	2017	Sakura Kinomoto from Cardcaptor Sakura: Clear Card (VA: Sakura Tange)	Tsumugi Takanashi from Idolish 7 (VA: Satomi Satō)	Kagura from Gintama. (VA: Rie Kugimiya)
41	2018	Emma from The Promised Neverland (VA: Sumire Morohoshi)	Neko Musume from GeGeGe no Kitaro (VA: Umeka Shōji)	Sakura Kinomoto from Cardcaptor Sakura: Clear Card (VA: Sakura Tange)
42	2019	Eripiyo from If My Favorite Pop Idol Made It to the Budokan, I Would Die (VA: Fairouz Ai)	Nezuko Kamado from Demon Slayer: Kimetsu no Yaiba (VA: Akari Kitō)	Shinobu Kocho from Demon Slayer: Kimetsu no Yaiba (VA: Saori Hayami)
43	2020	Nodoka Hanadera from Healin' Good Pretty Cure (VA: Aoi Yūki)	Manatsu Natsuumi from Tropical Rouge Pretty Cure (VA: Fairouz Ai)	Towa Higurashi from Yashahime (VA: Sara Matsumoto)
44	2021	Nezuko Kamado from Demon Slayer: Kimetsu no Yaiba (VA: Akari Kitō)	Daki from Demon Slayer: Kimetsu no Yaiba (VA: Miyuki Sawashiro)	Manatsu Natsuumi from Tropical Rouge Pretty Cure (VA: Fairouz Ai)

=== 2022–present ===
No.	Year	Character		
No.	Year	1st	2nd	3rd
45	2022	Anya Forger from Spy × Family (VA: Atsumi Tanezaki)	Draluc from The Vampire Dies in No Time (VA: Jun Fukuyama)	Ronaldo from The Vampire Dies in No Time (VA: Makoto Furukawa)
46	2023	Mizuki from Birth of Kitaro: The Mystery of GeGeGe (VA: Hidenobu Kiuchi)	Gegero from Birth of Kitaro: The Mystery of GeGeGe (VA: Toshihiko Seki and Masako Nozawa)	Isami Ao from Brave Bang Bravern! (VA: Ryōta Suzuki)
47	2024	Maomao from The Apothecary Diaries (VA: Aoi Yūki)	Mizuki from Birth of Kitaro: The Mystery of GeGeGe (VA: Hidenobu Kiuchi)	Gegero from Birth of Kitaro: The Mystery of GeGeGe (VA: Toshihiko Seki and Masako Nozawa)
48	2025	Cure Idol (Uta Sakura) from You and Idol Pretty Cure (VA: Misato Matsuoka)	Megumi Fushiguro from Jujutsu Kaisen (VA: Yuma Uchida)	Cure Wink (Nana Aokaze) from You and Idol Pretty Cure (VA: Minami Takahashi)

== Best Voice Acting ==
Megumi Hayashibara won 12 times and Akira Kamiya won 11 times. In 1994, Megumi Ogata won the voice actress, the Male character (Kurama) and the Female character (Haruka Tenoh).

=== 1979–1990 ===
==== Men's voice acting ====
No.	Year	Voice actor		
No.	Year	1st	2nd	3rd
1	1979	Akira Kamiya	Kei Tomiyama	Makio Inoue
2	1980 (1st half)	Akira Kamiya	Tōru Furuya	Kei Tomiyama
3	1980 (2nd half)	Akira Kamiya	Kei Tomiyama	Kazuhiko Inoue
4	1981	Akira Kamiya	Toshio Furukawa	Tōru Furuya
5	1982	Toshio Furukawa	Akira Kamiya	Yūji Mitsuya
6	1983	Akira Kamiya	Yūji Mitsuya	Toshio Furukawa
7	1984	Akira Kamiya	Toshio Furukawa	Yū Mizushima
8	1985	Akira Kamiya	Kazuhiko Inoue	Yuji Mistuya
9	1986	Kazuki Yao	Akira Kamiya	Kazuhiko Inoue
10	1987	Akira Kamiya	Tōru Furuya	Kazuhiko Inoue
11	1988	Akira Kamiya	Tōru Furuya	Kazuhiko Inoue
12	1989	Akira Kamiya	Toshio Furukawa	Kazuhiko Inoue
13	1990	Akira Kamiya	Kappei Yamaguchi	Toshio Furukawa

==== Women's voice acting ====
No.	Year	Voice actress		
No.	Year	1st	2nd	3rd
1	1979	Noriko Ohara	Yōko Asagami	Kazuko Sugiyama
2	1980 (1st half)	Noriko Ohara	Yōko Asagami	Mami Koyama
3	1980 (2nd half)	Noriko Ohara	Keiko Han	Yōko Asagami
4	1981	Mami Koyama	Keiko Han	Noriko Ohara
5	1982	Mami Koyama	Keiko Han	Fumi Hirano
6	1983	Mami Koyama	Mika Doi	Mayumi Tanaka
7	1984	Sumi Shimamoto	Mami Koyama	Mayumi Tanaka
8	1985	Saeko Shimazu	Sumi Shimamoto	Mami Koyama
9	1986	Mayumi Tanaka	Sumi Shimamoto	Saeko Shimazu
10	1987	Sumi Shimamoto	Eiko Yamada	Hiromi Tsuru
11	1988	Sumi Shimamoto	Mayumi Tanaka	Eiko Yamada
12	1989	Megumi Hayashibara	Sumi Shimamoto	Minami Takayama
13	1990	Megumi Hayashibara	Noriko Hidaka	Sumi Shimamoto

=== 1991–present ===
After its 14th edition, the Anime Grand Prix no longer separated women and men into distinct voice acting categories.

No.	Year	Voice actor		
No.	Year	1st	2nd	3rd
14	1991	Megumi Hayashibara	Noriko Hidaka	Toshihiko Seki
15	1992	Megumi Hayashibara	Kotono Mitsuishi	Aya Hisakawa
16	1993	Megumi Hayashibara	Kotono Mitsuishi	Megumi Ogata
17	1994	Megumi Ogata	Megumi Hayashibara	Mariko Kōda
18	1995	Megumi Hayashibara	Megumi Ogata	Toshihiko Seki
19	1996	Megumi Hayashibara	Megumi Ogata	Yūko Miyamura
20	1997	Megumi Hayashibara	Megumi Ogata	Yūko Miyamura
21	1998	Megumi Hayashibara	Omi Minami	Sakura Tange
22	1999	Megumi Hayashibara	Sakura Tange	Omi Minami
23	2000	Megumi Hayashibara	Sakura Tange	Toshihiko Seki
24	2001	Megumi Hayashibara	Yui Horie	Kappei Yamaguchi
25	2002	Sōichirō Hoshi	Megumi Hayashibara	Akira Ishida
26	2003	Romi Park	Akira Ishida	Sōichirō Hoshi
27	2004	Akira Ishida	Sōichirō Hoshi	Romi Park
28	2005	Sōichirō Hoshi	Akira Ishida	Romi Park
29	2006	Sōichirō Hoshi	Akira Ishida	Jun Fukuyama
30	2007	Jun Fukuyama	Aya Hirano	Akira Ishida
31	2008	Jun Fukuyama	Hiroshi Kamiya	Daisuke Ono
32	2009	Aki Toyosaki	Hiroshi Kamiya	Nana Mizuki
33	2010	Daisuke Ono	Mamoru Miyano	Hiroshi Kamiya
34	2011	Mamoru Miyano	Yūki Kaiji	Yū Kobayashi
35	2012	Yūki Kaji	Yū Kobayashi	Mamoru Miyano
36	2013	Yūki Kaji	Hiroshi Kamiya	Yū Kobayashi
37	2014	Tatsuhisa Suzuki	Jun'ichi Suwabe	Mamoru Miyano
38	2015	Jun Fukuyama	Hiroshi Kamiya	Yūichi Nakamura
39	2016	Hiroshi Kamiya	Mamoru Miyano	Yoshimasa Hosoya
40	2017	Sōma Saitō	Yūki Kaji	Kenshō Ono
41	2018	Sōma Saitō	Yūsuke Shirai	Shintarō Asanuma
42	2019	Natsuki Hanae	Sōma Saitō	Fairouz Ai
43	2020	Aoi Yūki	Fairouz Ai	Natsuki Hanae
44	2021	Takuya Eguchi	Fairouz Ai	Saori Hayami
45	2022	Makoto Furukawa	Atsumi Tanezaki	Ayumu Murase
46	2023	Atsumi Tanezaki	Hidenobu Kiuchi	Minori Suzuki
47	2024	Aoi Yūki	Kana Hanazawa	Hidenobu Kiuchi
48	2025	Saori Hayami	Yuma Uchida	Reina Ueda

== Best Song ==
=== 20th Century ===
No.	Year	Song		
No.	Year	1st	2nd	3rd
1	1979	"Kita no Okami, Minami no Tora" by Mitsuko Horie from Song of Baseball Enthusiasts (OP)	"Taga Tame ni" by Ken Narita from Cyborg 009 (OP)	"Tobe Gundam" by Kō Ikeda from Mobile Suit Gundam (OP)
2	1980 1st half	"Fukkatsu no Ideon" by Isao Taira from Space Runaway Ideon (OP)	"Tobe Gundam" by Kō Ikeda from Mobile Suit Gundam (OP)	"Ai no Planet" by Da-Capo from Toward the Terra (ED)
3	1980 2nd half	"Cosmos ni Kimi to" by Keiko Toda from Space Runaway Ideon (ED)	"Fukkatsu no Ideon" by Isao Taira from Space Runaway Ideon (OP)	"1,000,000 Kōnen no Ai" by Yoshito Machida from Cyborg 009: Legend of the Super Galaxy (ED)
4	1981	"Lum's Love Song" by Yūko Matsutani from Urusei Yatsura (OP)	"Ai no Kinjitō" by Ippo Hiura from Six God Combination Godmars (ED)	"Sayonara" by Mary MacGregor from Adieu Galaxy Express 999 (ED)
5	1982	"Macross" by Makoto Fujiwara from Super Dimension Fortress Macross (OP)	"17-sai no Densetsu" by Yūji Mitsuya from Six God Combination Godmars (ED)	"Ai no Kinjitō" by Ippo Hiura from Six God Combination Godmars (ED)
6	1983	"Hello Vifam" by TAO from Galactic Drifter Vifam (OP)	"Cat's Eye" by Anri from Cat's Eye (OP)	"Get It!" by MIQ from Xabungle Graffiti (ED)
7	1984	"Ai Oboete Imasu ka?" by Mari Iijima from Macross: Do You Remember Love? (BGM)	"Kaze no No Reply" by Mami Ayukawa from Heavy Metal L-Gaim (OP)	"Galient World" by Eurox from Panzer World Galient (OP)
8	1985	"Ru-Ru-Ru-Russian Roulette" by Meiko Nakahara from Dirty Pair (OP)	"Melos no Yōni Lonely Way" by Airmail from Nagasaki from Blue Comet SPT Layzner (OP)	"Mizu no Hoshi e Ai wo Komete" by Hiroko Moriguchi from Zeta Gundam (OP)
9	1986	"Kanashimi yo Konnichi wa" by Yuki Saito from Maison Ikkoku (OP)	"Kimi wo Nosete" by Azumi Inoue from Castle in the Sky (ED)	"Silent Voice" by Jun Hiroe from Gundam ZZ (OP)
10	1987	"Get Wild" by TM Network from City Hunter (ED)	"Hidamari" by Kōzō Murashita from Maison Ikkoku (OP)	"Pegasus Fantasy" by Make-Up from Saint Seiya (OP)
11	1988	"Beyond the Time" by TM Network from Gundam: Char's Counterattack (ED)	"Tonari no Totoro" by Azumi Inoue from My Neighbor Totoro (ED)	"Step" by Achi-Achi from Mashin Hero Wataru (OP)
12	1989	"Yasashisa ni Tsutsumareta Nara" by Yumi Matsutoya from Kiki's Delivery Service (ED)	"Running To Horizon" by Tetsuya Komuro from City Hunter 3 (OP)	"Miracle Girl" by Mariko Nagai from Yawara! (OP)
13	1990	"Blue Water" by Miho Morikawa from Nadia and the Secret of Blue Water (OP)	"Fight!" by Yumiko Takahashi from Mashin Hero Wataru 2 (OP)	"Yume wo Shinjite" by Hideaki Tokunaga from Dragon Quest: Legend of the Hero Abel (OP)
14	1991	"Winners" by G-Grip from Future GPX Cyber Formula (ED)	"I'll Come" by G-Grip from Future GPX Cyber Formula (OP)	"Blue Water" by Miho Morikawa from Nadia and the Secret of Blue Water (OP)
15	1992	"Moonlight Densetsu" by Dali from Sailor Moon (OP)	"Hohoemi no Bakudan" by Matsuko Mawatari from Yu Yu Hakusho (OP)	"Kaze no Mirai e" by Yuka Satō from The Brave of Legend Da-Garn (OP)
16	1993	"Moonlight Densetsu" by Dali from Sailor Moon R (OP)	"Sayonara Bye-Bye" by Matsuko Mawatari from Yu Yu Hakusho (ED)	"Anata Dake Mitsumeteru" by Maki Ōguro from Slam Dunk (ED)
17	1994	"Yuzurenai Negai" by Naomi Tamura from Magic Knight Rayearth (OP)	"Daydream Generation" by Matsuko Mawatari from Yu Yu Hakusho (ED)	"7th Moon" by Fire Bomber from Macross 7 (OP)
18	1995	"A Cruel Angel's Thesis" by Yoko Takahashi from Neon Genesis Evangelion (OP)	"Just Communication" by Two-Mix from Gundam Wing (OP)	"Hikari to Kage wo Dakishimeta Mama" by Naomi Tamura from Magic Knight Rayearth 2 (OP)
19	1996	"A Cruel Angel's Thesis" by Yoko Takahashi from Neon Genesis Evangelion (OP)	"Give A Reason" by Megumi Hayashibara from Slayers Next (OP)	"Successful Mission" by Megumi Hayashibara from Saber Marionette J (OP)
20	1997	"Rondo-Revolution" by Masami Okui from Revolutionary Girl Utena (OP)	"Komm, Süßer Tod" by Arianne from The End of Evangelion (BGM)	"Yūsha-ō Tanjō" by Masaaki Endō from The King of Braves GaoGaiGar (OP)
21	1998	"Dearest" by Yumi Matsuzawa from Nadesico: Prince of Darkness (ED)	"Infinity" by Megumi Hayashibara from Lost Universe (OP)	"Tank!" by Seatbelts from Cowboy Bebop (OP)
22	1999	"Platinum" by Maaya Sakamoto from Cardcaptor Sakura (OP)	"Will" by Chihiro Yonekura from Soul Hunter (OP)	"Dis" by Mika Arisaka from Infinite Ryvius (OP)
23	2000	"Platinum" by Maaya Sakamoto from Cardcaptor Sakura (OP)	"Still Time" by Hidenori Tokuyama from Gensomaden Saiyuki (OP)	"Sakura Saku" by Megumi Hayashibara from Love Hina (OP)

=== 21st Century ===
No.	Year	Song		
No.	Year	1st	2nd	3rd
24	2001	"For Fruits Basket" by Ritsuko Okazaki from Fruits Basket (OP)	"Over Soul" by Megumi Hayashibara from Shaman King (OP)	"Love Destiny" by Yui Horie from Sister Princess (OP)
25	2002	"Anna ni Issho Datta no Ni" by See-Saw from Gundam SEED (ED)	"Invoke" by TM Revolution from Gundam SEED (OP)	"Shizukana Yoru ni" by Rie Tanaka from Gundam SEED (BGM)
26	2003	"Melissa" by Porno Graffitti from Fullmetal Alchemist (OP)	"Kesenai Tsumi" by Nana Kitade from Fullmetal Alchemist (ED)	"Akatsuki no Kuruma" by Fiction Junction from Gundam SEED (BGM)
27	2004	"Ignited" by TM Revolution from Gundam SEED Destiny (OP)	"Reason" by Nami Tamaki from Gundam SEED Destiny (ED)	"Shangri-La" by Angela from Fafner in the Azure: Dead Aggressor (OP)
28	2005	"Kimi wa Boku ni Niteiru" by See-Saw from Gundam SEED Destiny (ED)	"Vestige" by TM Revolution from Gundam SEED Destiny (BGM)	"Hateshinaku Tōi Sora ni" by The Stand Up from Kyo Kara Maoh! (OP)
29	2006	"Colors" by Flow from Code Geass (OP)	"Hare Hare Yukai" by Aya Hirano feat. Minori Chihara and Yūko Gotō from The Melancholy of Haruhi Suzumiya (ED)	"Yūkyō Seishunka" by Ali Project from Code Geass (ED)
30	2007	"Motteke!! Sailor Fuku" by Aya Hirano feat. Emiri Katō, Kaori Fukuhara and Aya Endō from Lucky Star (OP)	"Daybreak's Bell" by L'Arc-en-Ciel from Gundam 00 (OP)	"Colors" by Flow from Code Geass (OP)
31	2008	"Monochrome no Kiss" by Sid from Black Butler (OP)	"Hakanaku mo Towa no Kanashi" by Uverworld from Gundam 00 (OP)	"Lion" by May'n feat. Megumi Nakajima from Macross Frontier (OP)
32	2009	"Don't Say Lazy" by Ho-Kago Tea Time (Note: A fictional band performed by Yōko Hikasa and Aki Toyosaki with Satomi Satō, Minako Kotobuki and Ayana Taketatsu.) from K-On! (ED)	"Kagayake! Girls" by Ho-Kago Tea Time from K-On! (ED)	"Only My Railgun" by Fripside from A Certain Scientific Railgun (OP)
33	2010	"Bokura no Goal" by T-Pistonz + KMC from Inazuma Eleven (OP)	"Sword Summit" by TM Network from Sengoku Basara: Samurai Kings (OP)	"Maji Bomber!!" by Berryz Kobo from Inazuma Eleven (ED)
34	2011	"Mata ne... no Kisetsu" by Inazuma Eleven All-Stars (Note: Consisting of Junko Takeuchi, Yuka Nishigaki, Hiroyuki Yoshino, Hirofumi Nojima, and Mamoru Miyano and later by Yuka Terasaki, Takashi Ōhara, Yū Kobayashi, Mitsuki Saiga, Haruka Tomatsu, Tatsuhisa Suzuki, Tai Yūki, Aoi Yūki, Mina Kasai and Chiaki Yurin. Each member of the group also voices a character from Inazuma Eleven series.) from Inazuma Eleven (ED)	"Maji Love 1000%" by Starish (Note: A fictional boy band performed by Takuma Terashima, Mamoru Miyano, Junichi Suwabe, Kenichi Suzumura, Kishō Taniyama, Hiro Shimono and Kōsuke Toriumi.) from Uta no Prince-sama: Maji Love 1000% (ED)	"Naseba Naru no sa Nanairo Tamago" by T-Pistonz + KMC from Inazuma Eleven GO (OP)
35	2012	"Te wo Tsunagō" by Inazuma Eleven All-Stars feat. Sayaka Kitahara from Inazuma Eleven GO 2: Chrono Stone (ED)	"V.I.P." by Sid from Magi: The Labyrinth of Magic (OP)	"Can Do" by Granrodeo from Kuroko's Basketball (OP)
36	2013	"Guren no Yumiya" by Linked Horizon from Attack on Titan (OP)	"Bokutachi no Shiro" by Inazuma Eleven All-Stars from Inazuma Eleven GO 2: Chrono Stone (ED)	"The Other Self" by Granrodeo from Kuroko's Basketball (OP)
37	2014	"Dried Up Youthful Fame" by Oldcodex from Free! Eternal Summer (OP)	"Future Fish" by Style Five (Note: Consisting of Nobunaga Shimazaki, Tatsuhisa Suzuki, Tsubasa Yonaga, Daisuke Hirakawa and Mamoru Miyano who also voice the main characters from Free! series.) from Free! Eternal Summer (ED)	"Imagination" by Spyair from Haikyu!! (OP)
38	2015	"Hanamaru Pippi wa Yoiko Dake" by AŌP from Mr. Osomatsu (OP)	"Zenryoku Batankyū" by AŌP from Mr. Osomatsu (OP)	"Six Same Faces" by Ken'ichi Suzumura feat. The Matsuno Brothers (Note: Consisting of Takahiro Sakurai, Yūichi Nakamura, Hiroshi Kamiya, Jun Fukuyama, Daisuke Ono, and Miyu Irino who also voice the main characters from Mr. Osomatsu.) from Mr. Osomatsu (ED)
39	2016	"History Maker" by Dean Fujioka from Yuri on Ice (OP)	"Freesia" by Uru from Gundam: Iron-Blooded Orphans (ED)	"Yōkoso Japari Park e" by Dōbutsu Biscuits (Note: Consisting of Saki Ono, Yuka Ozaki and Kana Motomiya who also voice main characters from Kemono Friends series.) feat. PPP (Note: Consisting of Aina Aiba, Mikoi Sasaki, Ikuko Chikuta, Ruka Nemoto and Kyōka Tamura who also voice characters from Kemono Friends series.) from Kemono Friends (OP)
40	2017	"Wish Voyage" by Idolish 7 (Note: A fictional boy band performed by Kenshō Ono, Toshiki Masuda, Yūsuke Shirai, Tsubasa Yonaga, Kenn, Atsushi Abe and Takuya Eguchi.) from Idolish 7 (OP)	"Heavenly Visitor" by Trigger (Note: A fictional boy band performed by Wataru Hatano, Sōma Saitō and Takuya Satō.) from Idolish 7 (ED)	"Togetsukyō (Kimi Omou)" by Mai Kuraki from Case Closed: The Crimson Love Letter (ED)
41	2018	"Zero" by Masaharu Fukuyama from Case Closed: Zero the Enforcer (ED)	"Prayer X" by King Gnu from Banana Fish (ED)	"I Beg You" by Aimer from Fate/Stay Night: Heaven's Feel 2 – Lost Butterfly (ED)
42	2019	"Gurenge" by LiSA from Demon Slayer: Kimetsu no Yaiba (OP)	"Onegai Muscle" by Fairouz Ai feat. Kaito Ishikawa from How Heavy Are the Dumbbells You Lift? (OP)	"Momoiro Kataomoi" by Fairouz Ai from If My Favorite Pop Idol Made It to the Budokan, I Would Die (ED)
43	2020	"Homura" by LiSA from Demon Slayer: Kimetsu no Yaiba – Mugen Train (ED)	"Kaikai Kitan" by Eve from Jujutsu Kaisen (OP)	"Healin' Good Touch!!" by Rie Kitagawa from Healin' Good Pretty Cure (OP)
44	2021	"Zankyōsanka" by Aimer from Demon Slayer: Kimetsu no Yaiba (OP)	"Cry Baby" by Official Hige Dandism from Tokyo Revengers (OP)	"Akeboshi" by Lisa from Demon Slayer: Kimetsu no Yaiba (OP)
45	2022	"Mixed Nuts" by Official Hige Dandism from Spy × Family (OP)	"Shukufuku" by Yoasobi from Gundam: The Witch from Mercury (OP)	"Asa ga Kuru" by Aimer from Demon Slayer: Kimetsu no Yaiba (ED)
46	2023	"Ba-Bang to Suisan! Bang Bravern" by Kenichi Suzumura from Brave Bang Bravern! (OP)	"Idol" by Yoasobi from Oshi no Ko (OP)	"Where Our Blue Is" by Tatsuya Kitani from Jujutsu Kaisen (OP)
47	2024	"Kaijū" by Sakanaction from Orb: On the Movements of the Earth (OP)	"Otonoke" by Creepy Nuts from Dandadan (OP)	"Arigatō Kokoro Kara" by Naniwa Danshi from Nintama Rantaro: Invincible Master of the Dokutake Ninja Squad (ED)
48	2025	"Aizo" by King Gnu from Jujutsu Kaisen (OP)	"Iris Out" by Kenshi Yonezu from Chainsaw Man: Reze Arc (OP)	"Zankoku na Yoru ni Kagayake" by LiSA from Demon Slayer: Kimetsu no Yaiba – Infinity Castle (ED)

== Most awarded studios ==
The list below cites the most awarded studios based on the productions of these studios that won the award for Best Anime of the Year.

Studio	Position		
Studio	1st	2nd	3rd
Sunrise	13	13	9
Toei Animation	5	7	5
OLM	4	2	2
Studio Pierrot	4	2	1
Gainax	4	1	0
Studio Ghibli / Topcraft	4	0	1
Tatsunoko	2	4	2
Ufotable	2	2	1
MAPPA	2	1	2
TMS Entertainment	2	1	2
Kyoto Animation	2	0	3
Madhouse	1	2	1
Production I.G / I.G. Tatsunoko	1	1	3
Studio Deen	1	1	3
Bones	1	1	1
Troyca	1	1	0
Group TAC	1	1	0
Xebec	1	0	3
Wit Studio	1	0	1
Toho Animation Studio	1	0	0
E&G Films	0	2	1
Artland	0	2	0
A-1 Pictures	0	1	2
Ashi Productions	0	1	1
Bandai Namco Pictures	0	1	1
Brain's Base	0	1	0
J.C.Staff	0	1	0
Cygames Pictures	0	1	0
Academy Productions	0	0	1
AIC	0	0	1
Studio Gallop	0	0	1
CloverWorks	0	0	1

== Defunct Awards ==
=== Best Episode (1979–2013) ===
No.	Year	Episode		
No.	Year	1st	2nd	3rd
1	1979	Episodes 13–14 (Note: Double episode.); Song of Baseball Enthusiasts	Episode 42; Space Pirate Captain Harlock	Episode 24; Mobile Suit Gundam
2	1980 (1st half)	Episode 43; Mobile Suit Gundam	Episode 41; Mobile Suit Gundam	Episode 43; Marco Polo's Adventures
3	1980 (2nd half)	Episode 155; Lupin III Part 2	Episode 145; Lupin III Part 2	Episode 32; Space Runaway Ideon
4	1981	Episode 26; Warring Demon God GoShogun	Episode 47; Tomorrow's Joe 2	Episode 39; Space Runaway Ideon
5	1982	Episode 44; Urusei Yatsura	Episode 19; Six God Combination Godmars	Episode 64; Six God Combination Godmars
6	1983	Episode 27; Super Dimension Fortress Macross	Episodes 47–48; Magical Princess Minky Momo	Episode 75; Urusei Yatsura
7	1984	Episode 46; Galactic Drifter Vifam	Episode 52; Magic Angel Creamy Mami	Episode 26; Giant Gorg
8	1985	Episode 36; Zeta Gundam	Episode 157; Urusei Yatsura	Episode 27; Touch
9	1986	Episode 36; Gundam ZZ	Episode 50; Zeta Gundam	Episode 194; Urusei Yatsura
10	1987	Episode 47; Gundam ZZ	Episode 31; Red Photon Zillion	Episode 77; Spaceship Sagittarius
11	1988	Episode 96; Maison Ikkoku	Episode 35; Sonic Soldier Borgman	Episode 45; The Three Musketeers
12	1989	Episode 28; Dragon Ball Z	Episodes 49–50; City Hunter 2	Episode 39; Ronin Warriors
13	1990	Episode 22; Nadia and the Secret of Blue Water	Episode 32; Mashin Hero Wataru 2	Episode 21; Nadia and the Secret of Blue Water
14	1991	Episode 39; Nadia and the Secret of Blue Water	Episode 37; Future GPX Cyber Formula	Episode 36; Future GPX Cyber Formula
15	1992	Episode 31; Sailor Moon	Episode 51; Mama Is Just a Fourth Grade Pupil	Episode 24; Sailor Moon
16	1993	Episode 45; Sailor Moon	Episode 46; Sailor Moon	Episode 170; Yadamon
17	1994	Episode 21; Sailor Moon S	Episode 51; Victory Gundam	Episode 89; Yu Yu Hakusho
18	1995	Episode 29; Magic Knight Rayearth 2	Episode 9 Neon Genesis Evangelion	Episode 29; Romeo and the Black Brothers
19	1996	Episode 24; Neon Genesis Evangelion	Episode 26; Neon Genesis Evangelion	Episode 26; Slayers Next
20	1997	Episode 26; Slayers Try	Episode 26; Martian Successor Nadesico	Episode 34; Sailor Stars
21	1998	Episode 26; Lost Universe	Episode 5 Cowboy Bebop	Episode 26; Cyber Team in Akihabara
22	1999	Episode 46; Cardcaptor Sakura	Episode 25; Saber Marionette J to X	Episode 26; Cowboy Bebop
23	2000	Episode 70; Cardcaptor Sakura	Episode 50 Ɐ Gundam	Episode 45; Hunter x Hunter
24	2001	Episode 50; Gensomaden Saiyuki	Episode 48; Inu Yasha	Episode 22; Fruits Basket
25	2002	Episode 1 Gundam SEED	Episode 5 Gundam SEED	Episode 8 Gundam SEED
26	2003	Episode 7 Fullmetal Alchemist	Episode 50; Gundam SEED	Episode 3 Fullmetal Alchemist
27	2004	Episode 50; Fullmetal Alchemist	Episode 1 Gundam SEED Destiny	Episode 6 Gundam SEED Destiny
28	2005	Episode 50; Gundam SEED Destiny	Episode 39; Gundam SEED Destiny	Episode 40; Kyo Kara Maoh
29	2006	Episode 51; Gundam SEED Destiny	Episode 1 Code Geass	Episode 26 (Note: Originally broadcast as episode 12); The Melancholy of Haruhi Suzumiya
30	2007	Episode 25; Code Geass	Episode 1 Gundam 00	Episode 23; Code Geass
31	2008	Episode 25; Code Geass R2	Episode 23; Gundam 00	Episode 25; Macross Frontier
32	2009	Episode 12; K-On!	Episode 50; Gundam 00	Episode 24; Black Butler
33	2010	Episode 24; K-On!!	Episode 65; Inazuma Eleven	Episode 7 Durarara!!
34	2011	Episode 127; Inazuma Eleven	Episode 13; Uta no Prince-sama: Maji Love 1000%	Episode 126; Inazuma Eleven
35	2012	Episode 25; Kuroko's Basketball	Episode 21; Inazuma Eleven GO 2: Chrono Stone	Episode 44; Inazuma Eleven GO
36	2013	Episode 12; Free! Iwatobi Swim Club	Episode 50; Inazuma Eleven GO 2: Chrono Stone	Episode 51; Inazuma Eleven GO 2: Chrono Stone

=== Best Director (1979–1989) ===
No.	Year	Director		
No.	Year	1st	2nd	3rd
1	1979	Rintaro	Yoshiyuki Tomino	Tadao Nagahama
2	1980 (1st half)	Rintaro	Yoshiyuki Tomino	Hayao Miyazaki
3	1980 (2nd half)	Yoshiyuki Tomino	Rintaro	Hayao Miyazaki
4	1981	Yoshiyuki Tomino	Rintaro	Hayao Miyazaki
5	1982	Yoshiyuki Tomino	Mamoru Oshii	Tetsuo Imazawa
6	1983	Yoshikazu Yasuhiko	Noboru Ishiguro	Mamoru Oshii
7	1984	Hayao Miyazaki	Noboru Ishiguro	Mamoru Oshii
8	1985	Yoshiyuki Tomino	Ryōsuke Takahashi	Gisaburo Sugii
9	1986	Hayao Miyazaki	Yoshikazu Yasuhiko	Yoshiyuki Tomino
10	1987	Mizuho Nishikubo	Yoshiyuki Tomino	Hiroyuki Yamaga
11	1988	Hayao Miyazaki	Katsuhiro Otomo	Isao Takahata
12	1989	Hayao Miyazaki	Mamoru Oshii	Hideaki Anno

=== Best Screenwriter (1979–1989) ===
No.	Year	Screenwriter		
No.	Year	1st	2nd	3rd
1	1979	Masaki Tsuji	Keisuke Fujikawa	Fumio Ishimori
2	1980 (1st half)	Masaki Tsuji	Hiroyuki Hoshiyama	Keisuke Fujikawa
3	1980 (2nd half)	Masaki Tsuji	Hiroyuki Hoshiyama	Hiroyasu Yamaura
4	1981	Masaki Tsuji	Hiroyuki Hoshiyama	Yū Yamamoto
5	1982	Masaki Tsuji	Keisuke Fujikawa	Takeshi Shudō
6	1983	Sukehiro Tomita	Kazunori Itō	Jun'ichi Iioka
7	1984	Hayao Miyazaki	Masaki Tsuji	Sukehiro Tomita
8	1985	Tsunehisa Itō	Keisuke Fujikawa	Hiroyuki Hoshiyama
9	1986	Hayao Miyazaki	Tsunehisa Itō	Hiroyuki Hoshiyama
10	1987	Tsunehisa Itō	Akira Miyazaki	Kenji Terada
11	1988	Hayao Miyazaki	Hideki Sonoda	Yasushi Hirano
12	1989	Hayao Miyazaki	Takao Koyama	Kazunori Itō

=== Best Character Designer (1979–1982) ===
No.	Year	Character designer		
No.	Year	1st	2nd	3rd
1	1979	Yoshikazu Yasuhiko	Shingo Araki	Akio Sugino
2	1980 (1st half)	Yoshikazu Yasuhiko	Shingo Araki	Akio Sugino
3	1980 (2nd half)	Yoshikazu Yasuhiko	Akio Sugino	Tomonori Kogawa
4	1981	Yoshikazu Yasuhiko	Kazuo Komatsubara	Hideyuki Motohashi
5	1982	Yoshikazu Yasuhiko	Hideyuki Motohashi	Haruhiko Mikimoto

=== Best Art Director (1979–1982) ===
No.	Year	Art director		
No.	Year	1st	2nd	3rd
1	1979	Takamura Mukuo	Geki Katsumata	Shichirō Kobayashi
2	1980 (1st half)	Takamura Mukuo	Mitsuki Nakamura	Shichirō Kobayashi
3	1980 (2nd half)	Takamura Mukuo	Mitsuki Nakamura	Geki Katsumata
4	1981	Takamura Mukuo	Mitsuki Nakamura	Tsutomu Ishigaki
5	1982	Takamura Mukuo	Mitsuki Nakamura	Tsutomu Ishigaki

== See also ==
- List of animation awards
