= City Hunter (1987 TV series) =

Japanese anime television series

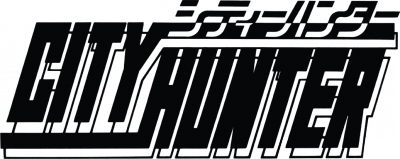

シティーハンター (Shitī Hanta)
- Anime television series
- Directed by: Kenji Kodama
- Music by: Ryoichi Kunoshi (1–26); Tatsumi Yano (6–51)
- Studio: Sunrise (Note: Credited as Nippon Sunrise until episode 8.)
- Licensed by: NA: ADV Films (former); Discotek Media
- Original network: NNS (YTV, NTV)
- English network: NA: Anime Network; SEA: Animax Asia; US: KTEH/KCAH
- Original run: April 6, 1987 – March 28, 1988
- Episodes: 51
- Anime television series

City Hunter 2
- Directed by: Kenji Kodama
- Music by: Tatsumi Yano
- Studio: Sunrise
- Licensed by: NA: ADV Films (former); Discotek Media
- Original network: NNS (YTV, NTV)
- English network: SEA: Animax
- Original run: April 8, 1988 – July 14, 1989
- Episodes: 63
- Anime film

City Hunter: .357 Magnum
- Directed by: Kenji Kodama
- Written by: Akinori Endo
- Music by: Tatsumi Yano
- Studio: Sunrise
- Licensed by: NA: ADV Films (former); Discotek Media
- Released: June 17, 1989
- Runtime: 87 minutes
- Anime television series

City Hunter 3
- Directed by: Kenji Kodama
- Written by: Yasushi Hirano
- Music by: Tatsumi Yano
- Studio: Sunrise
- Licensed by: NA: ADV Films (former); Discotek Media
- Original network: NNS (YTV, NTV)
- English network: SEA: Animax
- Original run: October 15, 1989 – January 21, 1990
- Episodes: 13
- Anime film

City Hunter: Bay City Wars
- Directed by: Kenji Kodama
- Written by: Yasushi Hirano
- Music by: Tatsumi Yano
- Studio: Sunrise
- Licensed by: NA: ADV Films (former); Discotek Media
- Released: August 25, 1990
- Runtime: 45 minutes
- Anime film

City Hunter: Million Dollar Conspiracy
- Directed by: Kenji Kodama
- Written by: Shoji Tonoike
- Music by: Tatsumi Yano
- Studio: Sunrise
- Licensed by: NA: ADV Films (former); Discotek Media
- Released: August 25, 1990
- Runtime: 43 minutes
- Anime television series

City Hunter '91
- Directed by: Kiyoshi Egami
- Music by: Tatsumi Yano
- Studio: Sunrise
- Licensed by: NA: ADV Films (former); Discotek Media
- Original network: NNS (YTV, NTV)
- English network: SEA: Animax
- Original run: April 28, 1991 – October 10, 1991
- Episodes: 13
- Anime television film

City Hunter: The Secret Service
- Directed by: Kenji Kodama
- Written by: Akinori Endo; Kenji Kodama
- Music by: Tatsumi Yano
- Studio: Sunrise
- Licensed by: NA: ADV Films (former); Discotek Media
- Original network: NNS (YTV, NTV)
- English network: NA: Anime Network
- Released: January 5, 1996
- Runtime: 90 minutes
- Anime television film

City Hunter: Goodbye My Sweetheart
- Directed by: Kazuo Yamazaki
- Written by: Tatsumi Yano
- Music by: Masara Nishida
- Studio: Sunrise
- Licensed by: NA: ADV Films (former); Discotek Media
- Original network: NNS (YTV, NTV)
- Released: April 25, 1997
- Runtime: 88 minutes
- Anime television film

City Hunter: Death of the Vicious Criminal Ryo Saeba
- Directed by: Masaharu Okuwaki
- Written by: Nobuaki Kishima
- Music by: Tatsumi Yano
- Studio: Sunrise
- Licensed by: NA: Discotek Media
- Original network: NNS (YTV, NTV)
- Released: April 23, 1999
- Runtime: 91 minutes
- Video game
- Developer: Sunsoft
- Publisher: Sunsoft
- Platform: PC Engine
- Released: JP: March 2, 1990
- icon

City Hunter (シティーハンター, Shitī Hanta) is a Japanese anime television series based on the manga series City Hunter by Tsukasa Hojo. Produced by Sunrise, the series aired on Yomiuri TV, Nippon Television and their affiliates from April 6, 1987, to March 28, 1988. It was later followed up by a sequel, City Hunter 2 (シティーハンター 2, Shitī Hanta 2) airing from April 1988 to July 1989 for 61 episodes. Another sequel, City Hunter 3 (シティーハンター 3, Shitī Hanta 3) aired from October 1989 to January 1990 while the final television entry, City Hunter '91 (シティーハンター '91, Shitī Hanta '91) aired from April to October 1991. It has spanned three films, two sequel television specials and a video game by Sunsoft in 1990 for the PC Engine.

== Cast ==
Character	Voice actor
Ryo Saeba	Akira Kamiya
Kaori Makimura	Kazue Ikura
Umibozu	Tesshō Genda
Saeko Nogami	Yōko Asagami
Miki	Mami Koyama
Hideyuki Makimura	Hideyuki Tanaka
Reika Nogami	Yoshino Takamori
Kasumi Asou	Miina Tominaga

== Production and release ==
Produced by Sunrise, the series was adapted into four animated series which were all aired on YTV, NTV and their affiliates. The first one, City Hunter was directed by Kenji Kodama was broadcast for 51 episodes between April 6, 1987, and March 28, 1988, and released on ten VHS cassettes between December 1987 and July 1988. The second one, City Hunter 2 was also directed by Kodama and was broadcast for 63 episodes between April 8, 1988, and July 14, 1989, and released on ten VHS cassettes between August 1988 and March 1990. City Hunter 3 was broadcast for 13 episodes from October 15, 1989, to January 21, 1990, and released on six VHS cassettes between November 1990 and April 1991 and City Hunter '91, featuring a new creative team led by director Kiyoshi Egami was broadcast between April 28 and October 10, 1991, and released on six VHS cassettes between February and July 1992.

The series was later reissued as 20 video compilations.

A 32-disc DVD boxset, City Hunter Complete, was published by Aniplex and released in Japan on August 31, 2005. The set contained all four series, the TV specials and animated movies as well as an art book and figures of Ryo and Kaori. 26 of the discs comprising the four series were then released individually between December 19, 2007, and August 27, 2008. 30,000 box sets were sold, grossing ¥3 billion ($38 million), in Japan.

For the 30th anniversary of the original manga, buyers of all 12 volumes of City Hunter XYZ edition were entitled receive a "motion graphic anime" DVD. The DVDe adapted a special Angel Heart chapter entitled "Ryo's Proposal" and was voiced by the original City Hunter cast.

The series was licensed by ADV Films for release in North America; they announced their acquisition in May 1998 at Project A-Kon 9. The first City Hunter series was released on the ADV Fansubs label in March 2000. The aim of this label was to provide cheaper subtitled-only VHS releases at a faster pace than usual. The series was scheduled for 13 tapes, consisting of four episodes each. The tapes could be ordered individually or as a subscription service.

ADV later released the series on DVD. The first series was released as two boxsets of five discs on July 29, 2003. City Hunter 2 was released as another two boxsets of five discs on October 28, and November 18, 2003. City Hunter 3 was released as a single boxset on December 2, 2003, and City Hunter '91 was released on December 16, 2003.

On April 20, 2019, Discotek Media announced that they had licensed the entire City Hunter animated franchise, including the 2019 movie, Shinjuku Private Eyes. The first 26 episodes of the first series were released on Blu-ray on February 25, 2020, followed by set 2 on April 28, 2021, City Hunter 2 in two sets on July 27 and September 28th respectively and the entirety of City Hunter 3 and City Hunter '91 was released on March 29 and April 26, 2022, respectively.

=== Theatrical movies ===
Three theatrical movies were released in 1989 and 1990. The first being City Hunter: .357 Magnum (シティーハンター 愛と宿命のマグナム, Shitī Hantā Ai to Shukumei no Magunamu) which was directed by Kodama from a screenplay by Akinori Endo and was released by JVC on June 17, 1989. City Hunter: Bay City Wars (シティーハンター ベイシティウォーズ, Shitī Hantā Bei Shitiu~ōzu) and City Hunter: Million Dollar Conspiracy (シティーハンター 百万ドルの陰謀, Shitī Hantā Hyaku Man-doru no Inbō) were both released as a double feature by Shochiku Fuji on August 25, 1990, both films were directed by Kodama with Bay City Wars being written for the screen by Yasushi Hirano and the other one being written by Shoji Tonoike.

ADV released .357 Magnum on VHS on August 10, 1999, and on DVD on April 8, 2003. They released Bay City Wars and Million Dollar Conspiracy on VHS on October 12, 1999, and January 25, 2000, respectively, and later released a DVD containing them as well as a bonus television episode, "The Lady Vanishes", on June 3, 2003. During their panel at Otakon 2022, Discotek Media announced that they licensed all of the theatrical and television film releases, and released them in a Blu-ray collection on January 31, 2023.

=== Television movies ===
Three television movies were produced: The Secret Service was broadcast on January 5, 1996, which was followed by Goodbye My Sweetheart on April 25, 1997, and Death of Vicious Criminal Ryo Saeba on April 23, 1999.

ADV released Goodbye My Sweetheart as City Hunter: The Motion Picture in North America on VHS on November 18, 1998, as their first release from the franchise, later releasing it on DVD on July 23, 2002.

== Music ==
For the original 1987 series, the first opening theme is titled "City Hunter 〜 Ai yo Kienai de 〜" performed by Kahoru Kohiruimaki while the second half features "Go Go Heaven" (ゴーゴーヘブン) performed by Yoshiyuki Ohsawa while the ending theme is titled "Get Wild" performed by TM Network. For City Hunter 2, the first opening theme is titled "Angel Night 〜 Tenshi no iru Basho 〜" performed by Psy-S while the second half features "Sara" performed by FENCE OF DEFENSE. The ending theme for the first half is titled "Super Girl" performed by Yasuyuki Okamura, while the second half features "Still Love Her (Ushinawareta Fuukei)" by TM Network. For City Hunter 3, the opening theme is titled "Running to Horizon" performed by Tetsuya Komuro while the ending theme is titled "Atsuku Naretara" performed by Kiyomi Suzuki. For City Hunter '91, the opening theme is titled "Down Town Game" performed by Gwinko while the ending theme is titled "Smile & Smile" performed by Aura.

== Video game ==
A video game based on the series, developed and published by Sunsoft was released on the PC Engine on March 2, 1990. A Revival Version was announced on September 24, 2025, and was released worldwide on PlayStation 5, Nintendo Switch, Nintendo Switch 2 and Windows via Steam on February 26, 2026.

== Reception ==
In a 2005 poll held by TV Asahi, City Hunter was voted 66th out of the 100 most popular animated TV series, as voted by TV viewers. A TV Asahi web-poll voted City Hunter 65th.

The characters Ryo and Kaori proved popular with fans. In the reader voted Animage Anime Grand Prix Saeba Ryo was voted second in the "Best Male Character" section in 1988. In 1989, 1990 and 1991 he was voted first. In 1992, he was voted sixth. Kaori Makamura was voted fifteenth in the "Best Female Character" category in 1988 before climbing to eighth in 1989. She then placed fifth in 1990 before falling to sixth and eleventh in 1991 and 1992, respectively.

The Motion Picture has been praised for the quality of its English dub but criticised for changing the character names.

The anime series was also popular in France, where it was dubbed as Nicky Larson and 140 episodes aired in the early 1990s.
