= List of The Irresponsible Captain Tylor characters =

The main crew of the Soyokaze. Left to right: Ensigns Emi and Yumi Hanner, Lt. (junior grade) Kojiro Sakai; Lt. K. Kim; Lt. Makoto Yamamoto; Lt. Commander Justy Ueki Tylor; Lt. Commander Yuriko Star; Lt. H. Katori; Master Sgt. M. Cryburn; First Lt. K. B. Andresen; Petty Officer Harumi; and Naval Surgeon H. Kitaguchi.

This list contains the primary and notable secondary characters in The Irresponsible Captain Tylor, a Japanese anime series created in 1992.

== Characters ==
=== United Planets Space Force ===
- Justy Ueki Tylor: The main character of The Irresponsible Captain Tylor represents the "ultimate slacker", who joins the military for what he hopes will be an easy life. Originally assigned to the Pension department of the United Planets Space Force, he unwittingly foiled a terrorist plot to kidnap and kill a retired admiral when he tried to deliver a late check by hand. For saving the war hero's life, Tylor was promoted to Lieutenant Commander and placed in command of the destroyer Soyokaze (a dumping ground for trouble makers and the unwanted). Tylor has, as his superiors have put it, 'The Devil's own luck' and usually can get out of any situation relatively unscathed, avoiding multiple assassination attempts and defeating enemy groups of vastly superior numbers. He does not really care for the rules, using his authority as captain to change whatever regulations seem too uptight for him. He is also easily led by his crew, who are able to convince him to allow them to wear comfortable clothes on watch, hold a swimsuit competition, and let the surgeon drink while on duty. The UPSF and the Ralgon Empire are constantly debating whether Tylor possesses the most brilliant military mind or whether he is just a lucky moron. Tylor's name is a reference both to Hitoshi Ueki and to the role Ueki played in Toho's 1960s Irresponsible Man series, Hitoshi Taira (Taira and Tylor are homophones in Japanese), and his first and middle name are a pun on the Japanese pronunciation of "Just Awake" which is mimicked by his normal half-awake look.
- Lt. Makoto Yamamoto: A very strait-laced, by-the-book military man. Yamamoto is the first officer on the Soyokaze and tried mightily to interject an air of professionalism to the outfit. Constantly enraged by Tylor's lack of discipline and his loose command of the troops, Yamamoto spends much of his free time in the medic's office taking tranquilizers and making use of the neuro-cleanser. Yamamoto sees Tylor for what he is, a bumbling fool, but is torn between the unwritten soldier's code of supporting and obeying your superior officer, and telling the UPSF brass what is REALLY going on. He is always on the lookout for a chance to get some form of command, hoping to get a ship of his own one day. By the end of the series, Yamamoto begins to warm up to and respect Tylor.
- Lt. Commander Yuriko Star: In the tradition of Tenchi Muyo!, she is one of the many beautiful women who happen to surround Tylor, and represents the "girl next door". Yuriko joined the UPSF to give her life structure, and applied for the Soyokaze, a ship known as a dump for disruptive elements, in order to reform its crew into proper soldiers. She attempts to obey the rules in almost every situation, and refuses to mix work and private life, to some degree even going as far as not having a life outside the uniform herself. She, unlike Yamamoto, has no problem telling Tylor that he has done something wrong, and spends as much effort trying to reform him as she spends on the rest of the crew together. During the OVA, we see a relationship develop between Tylor and herself, Yuriko even going as far as asking Tylor to meet up with her on Christmas Eve.
- Lt. Kyunghwa Kim: Helm and Communications Officer to the Soyokaze. Looking for purpose in life, Lt. Kim joined the UPSF because she believed that putting her life in danger would put her future into focus. Like the rest of the crew, she sees Tylor as an irresponsible leader with only luck saving him. However she does use this to her advantage by wearing non-regulatory clothing on board the ship as Tylor does not object to it. Kim is up to date with the latest fashion and, while on leave, does do some modelling in her spare time.
- Lt. Harold Katori: Pilot and Navigator to the Soyokaze. Katori is a well-mannered helmsman who is confident in his navigational skills. He sometimes refers to the way of the Buddha when making a point but it is still a surprise when it is revealed that he is actually bald and wears a blonde wig.
- Nurse Petty Officer Harumi: Assigned to the Soyokaze as the doctor's assistant, the beautiful Harumi has every man on board lining up at the infirmary for minor things like cut fingers or stomach aches. Harumi is very professional with all of them, but seems to take a large interest in the captain. It turns out that she is a Raalgon spy, first sent to learn about, then to track, and eventually to kill Tylor. He manages to talk her out of her assassination plans (further impressing the Raalgon military) and feeds her just enough information to make it look like her spying is working, but not enough to endanger the Soyokaze and her crew. Her role in the light novel is much smaller than in the animated television series. In episode 14, she openly confesses that she is in fact not "human", but an android, which was already shortly mentioned in episode 12 and the preview to episode 14.
- The Marines: Soldiers led by First Lt. Andressen and Master Sergeant Cryborne, the Marines are a rough and crude bunch who are always spoiling for a fight. They usually keep to themselves in their section of the ship and run that part pretty much as they see fit, bristling whenever Yamamoto or Yuriko venture down and demand a cleanup. The Marines use yellow powered exoskeletons (pink for Cryborne) which are so small that the marines have to crouch inside to pilot them.
- Lt. (junior grade) Kojiro Sakai: The star pilot of the Soyokaze. Kojiro is famous on board for his misogyny, not allowing any women near his plane or himself, but this is more gynophobia, being aggressive to any women trying to get physically close to him. Despite this, Kojiro later volunteers to teach the twins how to be fighter pilots when he sees their natural abilities in the cockpit. Kojiro is also very hot-headed, getting into fights with the Marines at the slightest provocation.
- Ensigns Emi and Yumi Hanner: Daughters of Admiral Hanner, one of the UPSF's most decorated war heroes, the twins first came into contact with Tylor when he came to deliver their father's pension check and saved them from being killed by the terrorist's bomb. They immediately signed up with the UPSF and used their father's influence to get themselves assigned to the Soyokaze to be with Tylor. Once aboard, they trained to be pilots under Kojiro, who recognized that they had natural talent that exceeded what a standardized pilot's test could measure. These twins are never seen apart, and in fact each have one half of their hairstyle. They are strong supporters of Tylor, even wanting to become his lovers.
- The Brass: Admirals Mifune and Fuji are Tylor's superior officers in the UPSF. They know that Tylor is not qualified to be a captain, or even to work in the Pension department, but his successes keep forcing them to commend and promote him. Mifune and Fuji tried to kill Tylor on a couple of occasions, but later shunted he and his crew out to the Demotion Sector, far from the fighting and, more importantly, far away from UPSF headquarters. Ironically, it is Mifune, the admiral who dislikes him most, whom comes to appreciate him for his unconventional (and thus non-stagnant) approach to warfare. This becomes most evident in the later productions in the Tylor universe, where a grudging Mifune frequently turns to Tylor as a troubleshooter for sticky situations.

=== The Holy Raalgon Empire ===
The Raalgon Empire is based on elf-like people commonly wearing eastern clothes such as turbans, often with horns on their head attire. Their technology seems techno-organic.

- Queen Azalyn Goza: She is an attractive alien ruler who adores Tylor, despite the fact that her advisors are plotting against him. As the 16-year-old empress of the Holy Raalgon Empire, Azalyn is a child forced into the unenviable situation of having to assume power of the empire once her parents are murdered. Prompted by her advisors, she gives the command to attack the UPSF (assuming that they were behind the assassination plot). Having not had a chance to be a child, Azalyn must now be strong for the entire empire, and it's a task that she is afraid of taking, but even more afraid of failing.
- Wang: Chief advisor to the Empress, Wang yearns for greater power. He is a master at twisting the opinions of the court, forcing Azalyn to take his suggestions, in effect letting Wang control things as he sees fit. Even this is not enough and Wang makes a couple of attempts on Azalyn's life in hopes that the reins of power will fall to him.
- Captain Dom: Dom is the commander of one of the Raalgon fleets. He speaks candidly with the Empress, in stark contrast to the bowing and scraping and lying of the rest of her court. Dom gains Azalyn's trust and becomes one of her more valued advisors. Dom is also very interested in Tylor, feeling that Tylor would be not only a worthy adversary, but also a challenge for anyone to decipher and defeat. It is Dom who assigned Harumi to spy on the Soyokaze's enigmatic captain, but even with the constant data coming in from his valued spy, Dom is still unsure whether Tylor really knows what he is doing or if he is just a fool. During the OVA his personality goes further, hitting on Yuriko when she and the Soyokaze crew were captured, as well as whipping Tylor after believing him to repeatedly make emotional and sexual assaults on Azalyn.
- Shia Has: a Raalgon commander, and often partnered with Dom. Wears a bikini, a cape, and a horned helmet. She is unswervingly loyal to the Raalgon Empire. Like Dom, she is sent to deal with the Soyokaze, but after being tricked by Tylor, she becomes far more critical of him than others. Oddly, she never shows any relationship with Dom other than strong comradeship. During the OVA, she tries to use her sexual wiles on the captured Kojiro only for him to faint from a nosebleed.
