= List of Lost Universe episodes =

The following is a list of Lost Universe episodes. The anime first premiered in 1998 and was later released on DVD by ADV Films from 2000 to 2001 and then re-released by Nozomi Entertainment in 2007 and 2014.

== Episode list ==
No.	Title	Original release date	English airdate
1	"A Blade of Light Shines (光刃(ひかりのやいば)輝く, Hikari no yaiba kagayaku)"	April 3, 1998	July 7, 2003
Kain and Canal infiltrate an artificial satellite from a crime organization where they are auctioning stolen items on the black market. Meanwhile, a teenage girl tries to investigate the situation and gets caught. Kain ends up freeing the girl, known as Millie. Canal turns out to be the manifestation of the ship's computer of Kain's ship, the Sword Breaker. Kain battles a mecha aboard the satellite.
2	"The Goddess Flies (女神翔ぶ, Megami tobu)"	April 10, 1998	July 14, 2003
Millie wants to join up with Kain on their adventures, but Kain refuses. Rail contacts Kain and asks him to go after an out of control cruiser ship. Millie ponders whether Sword Breaker is one of the legendary Lost Ships.
3	"The Kitchen Dances (厨房踊る, Chūbō odoru)"	April 17, 1998	July 21, 2003
Kain meets up with Rail about his next assignment, the transport of a crime witness to a trial location. Kain refuses the assignment, but his new partner, Millie has signed the deal, so they are stuck with it. They make it to the planet without incident, but when Millie escorts the witness, they are attacked by pirates.
4	"Feasting On Coconut Crab (ヤシガニ屠る, Yashigani hofuru)"	April 24, 1998	July 28, 2003
Millie strives to be the Best in the Universe, and when the gang reaches the resort planet of Sunzania, she volunteers to participate in a beauty contest. But the resort doesn't make for a safe place, as Kain and Millie get attacked by a robot, and then a group of bad guys attack and separate the two. A mysterious woman named Kali representing the Nightmare group confronts Kain using a whip.
5	"Flames Roar (光炎轟く, Kōen todoroku)"	May 1, 1998	August 4, 2003
Kain gets an assignment to guard a military weapons factory. Canal is more than happy to take this opportunity to upgrade her weapons including getting that beam-missile. While on duty, a man named Roy Glen has been in cahoots with the Nightmare organization. The job turns out to be a trap as Roy orders a group of men to attack Kain, and some ships move in to attack Sword Breaker.
6	"Fallen Angels Run (駄天使疾る, Datenshi hashiru)"	May 8, 1998	August 11, 2003
Kain and the gang visit a ship that consists of nursing students who are all women! This means Kain, much like Gourry and Zelgadis in the Slayers tradition, gets to dress up as a girl. They learn that there are two competing factions on board, and a major exam is coming up.
7	"Knight Checks (棋士まみえる, Kishi mamieru)"	May 15, 1998	August 18, 2003
Kain and Millie end up arguing with Canal over their next assignment which is to find someone who has gone missing. They split up to do the search, but a group known as Nightmare makes its presence known and attacks each of the teams.
8	"Nina Corners (ニーナ窮す, Nīna kyūsu)"	May 22, 1998	August 25, 2003
Kain's group are on assignment to escort Minister Magma via a public ship, but they are hijacked by some people in chicken costumes. The bumbling Nina steps in and helps out.
9	"Toilet Fears (厠消ゆ, Kawaya shōyu)"	May 29, 1998	September 1, 2003
Kain and the gang get a distress call from a ship graveyard. They find a crystal and bring it on board, but it distorts space and now they can't even find the bathroom.
10	"Vagrancy Decides (流浪決する, Rurō kessuru)"	June 5, 1998	September 8, 2003
Kain takes on a job of guarding some energy resources for an immigration ship, and gets recruited by some little kids to coach their basketball team.
11	"Friendship Scatters (朋友散る, Hōyū chiru)"	June 12, 1998	September 15, 2003
Kain takes on a job of escorting La Gould's boats, but one of his old friends, Jess, also gets a similar assignment. They place a wager on the success of their assignment, but unknown to both of them, there are some larger scale plans involving La Gould.
12	"Rain Of Tears Ends (涙雨果てる, Namidaame hateru)"	June 19, 1998	September 22, 2003
Following the events with Jesse in the previous episode, Kain and the gang interrogate Merina, who reveals La Gould's hideout. But La Gould has a ship named Death Cloud on his side.
13	"Reminiscence Whirlpools (追憶巡る, Tsuioku meguru)"	June 26, 1998	September 29, 2003
Kain and the gang arrive at green planet E-17, where he meets up with his grandmother Alice. Actually Alice had died. While he remembers Alice, Kain encounters a mysterious person who really gives him a scare.
14	"Fear Whispers (恐怖ささやく, Kyōfu sasayaku)"	July 3, 1998	October 6, 2003
Kain meets an old friend named Atlas who wants to go one more mission together with Kain to a processing plant on a planet full of dangerous chemicals.
15	"Nightmare Appears (悪夢現る, Akumu arawaru)"	July 10, 1998	October 13, 2003
Kain and the gang visit a planet that houses a material transporter which is run by Roy Glen.
16	"Millie Desires (ミリィ欲する, Mirī yoku suru)"	July 17, 1998	October 20, 2003
Millie and Canal fight again as the Sword Breaker stops to gather supplies. Millie leaves and tries to fend for herself, while Kain and Canal try to move onto some more serious adventuring.
17	"Universal Guardian Explodes (警部ブッ飛ぶ, Keibu buttobu)"	July 24, 1998	October 27, 2003
The Interstellar Police suspect Rail is selling secrets, and try to track him down. One of the Lost Ships, Rag D'Mezekis, makes the news. Kain wants to investigate but as he arrives at the scene, he is surprised by Kali again. Rail also makes a move to acquire Rag D'Mezekis, with his motivations to be a secret.
18	"The Scoundrel Is Swept Away (無頼流れる, Burai nagareru)"	July 31, 1998	November 3, 2003
Kain and the two girls enter a spaceport, disguising the name of ship as "Space One." Roy Glen is punished for his failures. Gore Nova confronts the Swordbreaker.
19	"Darkness Lures (闇誘う, Yami sasou)"	August 7, 1998	November 10, 2003
Gore Nova easily deflects the Swordbreaker's attack.
20	"Nightmare Prevails (想い届かず, Omoi todokazu)"	August 14, 1998	November 17, 2003
Stargazer orders his battleships into an all-out attack. Nezard damages the Swordbreaker, but is told to leave by Rail and Rag D'Mezigis. However, Rail has lost his energy and Rag D'Mezigis leaves the battlefield.
21	"Field Of Ice Burns (氷原燃える, Hyōgen moeru)"	August 21, 1998	November 24, 2003
Kain chooses an ice planet to repair Swordbreaker 100%. The Swordbreaker confronts Nezard.
22	"Destiny Spins (宿命紡ぐ, Shukumei tsumugu)"	August 28, 1998	December 1, 2003
Kain loses control of his psychic energy. Rail confronts Rag D'Mezigis with the secrets of the Lost Ships.
23	"Ashura Comes (阿修羅来たる, Ashura kitaru)"	September 4, 1998	December 8, 2003
The Sword Breaker approaches Nightmare's headquarters, but it will not be an easy invasion as somehow the neighboring planets and satellites are positioned to block Sword Breaker and one of the planets even explodes! Kali threatens to destroy some more planets unless Kain and Sword Breaker step out for a showdown. Kain accepts but then Kali makes the ultimate sacrifice and has the Rag D'Mezegis ship consume her soul.
24	"The Maiden Returns (乙女還る, Otome kaeru)"	September 11, 1998	December 15, 2003
Now that Kali has fused into Rag D'Mezegis, she is more fearsome than ever with her ship sized energy whip. Nina and Millie try to help out, but Kain wants to fuse with Sword Breaker and duke it out with Kali.
25	"Angelic Demon Strikes (聖魔相撃つ, Seima ai utsu)"	September 18, 1998	December 22, 2003
Sword Breaker blasts through a barrage of enemy ships. Canal is dressed as a cheerleader as she leads Millie and Nina. No matter how many units they destroy, more enemy units keep appearing. The group heads toward Tor Beta. But now the Gore Nova ship merges with Dark Star and becomes an awesome fighting power. Kain heads toward Dark Star in a shuttle in order to shut down its power so Sword Breaker can fire a psy-beam from within and destroy Dark Star. Canal reveals Millie's true identity as Millenium Feria Stargazer, the daughter of the leader of Nightmare. Millie gets transported to the battlefield where Kain and Stargazer are fighting.
26	"And Then a Blade of Light Shines (そして…光刃輝く, Soshite... kōjin kagayaku)"	September 25, 1998	December 29, 2003
Kain boards Stargazer's ship to rescue Millie, but when he's there, he has to face Millie who struggles with her family's legacy. While Canal puts everything she has to destroy the boss ship, Kain and Stargazer battle it out in the big finale.
