= List of Macross Frontier episodes =

This is a list of episodes and episode summaries for the Macross Frontier anime series.

== Episodes ==
No.	Title	Original release date
1	"Close Encounter"; Transliteration: "Kurōsu Enkauntā" (Japanese: クロース·エンカウンター)	December 23, 2007 (Deculture edition); April 3, 2008 (broadcast); July 25, 2008 (Yack Deculture edition - Blu-ray and DVD)
The famous galactic idol singer, Sheryl Nome, arrives on Macross Frontier Colonial Fleet for the last leg of her 18-month-long concert tour. During Sheryl's first performance aboard the Frontier, an unidentified and powerful alien threat starts to attack. Alto Saotome and Ranka Lee, two high school students who were present at the scene, end up being caught into the battle between this new alien threat and the SMS, a private military contractor employed by the Colonial Fleet.
2	"Hard Chase"; Transliteration: "Hādo Cheisu" (Japanese: ハード·チェイス)	April 10, 2008
To protect his and Ranka's life, Alto takes control of one of the SMS Skull Platoon's VF-25 Messiah fighters after the original pilot is killed in action. Alto rescues Ranka and flies for their dear lives while the rest of the SMS Skull Platoon comes to the rescue. After the battle, Ozma Lee, the leader of Skull Platoon and Ranka's legal guardian, takes Alto to SMS headquarters and asks to know how his teammate died.
3	"On Your Marks"; Transliteration: "On Yua Mākusu" (Japanese: オン·ユア·マークス)	April 17, 2008
After Ozma angrily expels Alto from SMS headquarters, the latter unexpectedly meets Ranka and Sheryl again at an observation park. However, the Vajra also shows up in the skies above the three, so they immediately head to the park's emergency shelter and get trapped inside. Ozma is wounded in the ensuring battle and Alto visits him at the hospital afterward. There, Ozma tells Alto the story behind Ranka and the Vajra and Alto makes the fateful decision to join SMS as a pilot.
4	"Miss Macross"; Transliteration: "Misu Makurosu" (Japanese: ミス·マクロス)	April 24, 2008
Alto, who was accepted into the SMS, is put through the paces by his comrades. Meanwhile, Ranka has passed the initial rounds of the Miss Macross Frontier contest auditions and sings a song for the very final screening stage.
5	"Star Date"; Transliteration: "Sutā Deito" (Japanese: スター·デイト)	May 1, 2008
Sheryl seeks out Alto again in her quest to find the earring she lost in episode 1, which is a keepsake from her mother. She orders Alto to guide her around the Macross Frontier fleet, and the two end up on a date of sorts. Elsewhere, Ozma and Ranka argue about her decision of becoming a singer. Ranka runs away from home and Alto's classmate/superior officer Michel Blanc finds her on the street. Somehow, Alto, Sheryl, and Ranka all end up in the Zentradi Mall, where their paths cross once again and Ranka's future is changed forever.
6	"Bye-Bye, Sheryl"; Transliteration: "Bai Bai Sheriru" (Japanese: バイバイ·シェリル)	May 8, 2008
Ranka is scouted by the president of an entertainment production company. While Sheryl is rehearsing for her farewell concert on the final day of her tour, news arrives that the Macross Galaxy fleet is being attacked by a large horde of Vajra. As a result, President Howard Glass decides to inform his citizens of the new enemies' existence. SMS activates its emergency order, and its carrier, Macross Quarter, sortied forth to rescue the Galaxy Fleet with Alto and the Skull Platoon aboard.
7	"First Attack"; Transliteration: "Fāsuto Atakku" (Japanese: ファースト·アタック)	May 15, 2008
After the Macross Galaxy fleet is hit by a large-scale Vajra attack, SMS Macross Quarter and the Skull Platoon engaged in fierce combat against the Vajra to rescue two surviving battleships that folded in. At the same time, Sheryl gives her farewell concert on Macross Frontier with Ranka in the audience. During heavy fighting, Luca is captured by a Vajra battle cruiser, and Alto charges into the enemy ship to rescue him. Inside the Vajra vessel, Alto encounters a mysterious purple VF.
8	"High School Queen"; Transliteration: "Hai Sukūru Kuīn" (Japanese: ハイスクール·クイーン)	May 22, 2008
Ranka transfers to Mihoshi Academy so as to be able to pursue a career in entertainment, and a wild commotion is created when Sheryl pays a visit there and loses her panties to a strange green creature. After she retrieves her underwear Ranka adopts the creature in secret and names it Ai-kun.
9	"Friendly Fire"; Transliteration: "Furendorī Faia" (Japanese: フレンドリー·ファイア)	May 29, 2008
Grace O'Connor talks to Michel about his disgraced deceased elder sister. Michel is troubled by it and during a battle with the Vajra, he almost hits Alto by mistake, which causes heated tensions between the two.
10	"Legend of Zero"; Transliteration: "Rejendo obu Zero" (Japanese: レジェンド·オブ·ゼロ)	June 5, 2008
Ranka is hired to act for a supporting role in the movie, Bird Human, which re-tells the legend between the pilot Shin Kudo, the Mayan priestess Sara Nome and her sister Mao, and the Birdman, a mysterious alien artifact (See Macross Zero OAV series). Meanwhile, Sheryl and Alto are also on site because Sheryl is providing some of the songs for the movie. At the end of the movie production, the relationships between Alto, Ranka, and Sheryl get a lot more complicated.
11	"Missing Birthday"; Transliteration: "Misshingu Bāsudē" (Japanese: ミッシング·バースデー)	June 19, 2008
Ranka takes some time out of her busy work schedule to prepare a special gift for Alto's approaching birthday. Meanwhile, Sheryl and Alto's adopted brother also have their own ideas about Alto's birthday. As a result, Alto has a tough decision to make.
12	"Fastest Delivery"; Transliteration: "Fasutesuto Deribarī" (Japanese: ファステスト·デリバリー)	June 26, 2008
Sheryl volunteers to give a relief concert for the N.U.N.S. 33rd Naval/Marine Zentradi Fleet at planet Galia 4 (惑星ガリア4), but because of a sudden illness she faints right after arrival. This starts a mutiny from a Zentradi Marines faction, who promptly take Sheryl's entire entourage (including Alto) hostage. In an attempt to defuse the situation, Michel flies to Galia 4 carrying a very special cargo - Ranka Lee.
13	"Memory of the Global"; Transliteration: "Memorī obu Gurōbaru" (Japanese: メモリー·オブ·グローバル)	July 3, 2008
During a flight across the skies of Galia 4 Alto and Ranka make an emergency landing due to equipment malfunction and discovered the wreckage of a first-generation Macross class ship called "Global" that belonged to the 117th Large Scale Research Fleet. Ranka begins to get flashbacks from her past which is linked to the Global. Soon thereafter, Ranka is kidnapped by unknown forces and Alto sets out to rescue her. Meanwhile, O'Connor has her own plans as Sheryl and Michel set out to look for Alto and Ranka.
14	"Mother's Lullaby"; Transliteration: "Mazāzu Rarabai" (Japanese: マザーズ·ララバイ)	July 10, 2008
The incident on Galia 4 results in a confrontation between the Frontier fleet and the Vajra. Alto returns to SMS Macross Quarter to arm up and then sets out to rescue Ranka, who is on the Vajra mothership. While trapped inside Ranka receives a vision of her late mother singing "Aimo", the song from her childhood. Meanwhile, Alto charges into the mothership while Ranka's song distracts the Vajra from attacking. But just before Alto succeeds in rescuing Ranka, the mysterious VF pilot Brera Sterne swoops in and snatches Ranka away. Brera then announces Ranka's rescue and reveals that he is a Major from the Macross Galaxy fleet's special forces.
15	"Lost Peace"; Transliteration: "Rosuto Pīsu" (Japanese: ロスト·ピース)	July 17, 2008
While recovering from her illness in a hospital Sheryl is a little insecure about Ranka's rising popularity, but O'Connor tells her that all her assignments are canceled until she recovers her health. Before Sheryl can get another word in, O'Connor leaves. Just then, Alto visits Sheryl's room with Ranka in tow. The three of them end up on the interior balcony of the hospital, where Sheryl and Ranka start one-upping each other about their relationship with Alto.
16	"Ranka Attack"; Transliteration: "Ranka Atakku" (Japanese: ランカ·アタック)	July 24, 2008
The Frontier Government replaces Elmo with O'Connor as Ranka's manager. Sheryl sees O'Connor and Ranka in a newscast and sneaks out of the hospital to find Alto. Sheryl ends up on the Quarter's bridge as SMS and NUNS conduct a military operation against the Vajra to test the effects of Ranka's singing on the mysterious aliens.
17	"Goodbye, Sister"; Transliteration: "Gubbai Shisutā" (Japanese: グッバイ·シスター)	July 31, 2008
Ozma promises Ranka that he will attend her first live concert on Macross Frontier, but he is ordered to defend the fleet from another Vajra attack before that. During the battle, Brera reveals that the Vajra are constantly evolving and that the information related to the damage that one unit receives is instantly shared and stored by the whole race and used as feedback during the creation of new units. This makes the use of the same type of attack on them useless over time. Ranka's singing appears to be the only way to stop the Vajra from attacking.
18	"Fold Fame"; Transliteration: "Fōrudo Fēmu" (Japanese: フォールド･フェーム)	August 7, 2008
Due to repeated Vajra attacks, the Frontier Colonial Fleet's government approves a proposal to initiate a long-distance fold jump to escape from the Vajra assaults. As a result, all resources are being rationed. During this time, Sheryl tries to confront O'Connor about recent events but learns some very unpleasant revelations from her former manager. Distraught, Sheryl ends up walking alone in the rain searching for Alto when she collapses on the sidewalk due to her illness. Suddenly, help arrives from an unexpected source: Alto's adoptive older brother. Meanwhile, the Vajra launches a surprise attack before the Colonial Fleet is ready to initiate fold jump. In the ensuing battle, the fleet's military is completely out-classed due to the ineffectiveness of its weapons against the Vajra. In this desperate hour, Ranka appears on the battlefield to turn the tide of war with her song.
19	"Triangler"; Transliteration: "Toraiangurā" (Japanese: トライアングラー)	August 14, 2008
As the Colonial Fleet celebrates the success of its long distance fold jump, Ranka's pet Ai-kun suddenly disappears. Ranka and Brera look for Ai-kun together, ditching the victory parade where Ranka is the guest of honor. Along the way, Brera asks Ranka who does she sing for. Ranka, who's beginning to feel doubt about her singing, starts to consider her true feelings. Meanwhile, Alto sneaks into the Satome Estate to visit Sheryl, who tells Alto that she will no longer sing. Alto leaves in frustration to go to Ranka's concert at Mihoshi Academy, where he and Michel are participating as stunt pilots. As the concert goes into full swing and Alto realizes that Ranka is singing for him, Sheryl quietly watches from a distant hill and decides she is going to walk away, but is stopped by Michel's Zentrandi sweetheart and SMS pilot Clan Clang. Ozma and former sweeheart Lt. Catherine "Cathy" Glass complete their secret investigation of Chief of Staff/series sub-antagonist Leon Mishima and confront him in his office. Nanase asks Luca to help her find Ranka's pet Ai-kun and draws a picture of it for him, who becomes shocked because he recognizes Ai-kun as a Vajra spawn he saw on Mishima's computer earlier.
20	"Diamond Crevasse"; Transliteration: "Daiamondo Kurebasu" (Japanese: ダイアモンド·クレバス)	August 21, 2008
After Ranka's concert at Mihoshi Academy ended, Ranka runs to the school rooftop looking for Alto, planning to confess her feelings to him. However, to Ranka's surprise and dismay, she found Sheryl in Alto's arms when she finally get there. As Ranka runs away in tears, the Vajra appear inside the main island, turning the entire city into a war zone. During the attack Mishima starts a coup and his men assassinate Frontier President Howard Glass, while Michel dies while protecting Clan from the Vajra.
21	"Blue Ether"; Transliteration: "Ao no Ēteru" (Japanese: 蒼のエーテル)	August 28, 2008
In the ongoing war against the Vajra, people lose their loved ones and their hatred grows. The effects of Mishima's conspiracy grow larger and alter the lives of everyone inside Frontier. Refusing to be a singing tool for Mishima and wanting to discover the truth about her past memories of the 117 Research Fleet, Ranka tells Alto that she loved him as she leaves the colony with Brera and her Vajra pet, "Ai-Kun" on a mission to seek out the Vajra. Note: it is the only episode title not written entirely in katakana.
22	"Northern Cross"; Transliteration: "Nōzan Kurosu" (Japanese: ノーザン·クロス)	September 4, 2008
The Frontier populance's hatred of the Vajra is growing by leaps and bounds, and even Alto and Luca cannot control their own hate. Meanwhile, Sheryl decides to sing again with a brand new perspective, and Luca discovers that Sheryl's singing can now generate faint fold waves like Ranka's because of her V-Type virus infection. However, this is only possible because Sheryl's infection has reached a terminal stage where it can no longer be cured. Alto learns of Sheryl's illness and promised Sheryl that he will stay by her side until the very last moment. Bobby finds Ozma and Cathy and they finally reunite with the rest of the SMS forces. Ozma and Cathy then expose Mishima as the mastermind behind the president's assassination to Captain Wilder and the Macross Quarter bridge crew. As a result, the Macross Quarter and majority of its crew deserts the fleet to search for Ranka. However, Alto, Luca, Clan and Nene Rora remain in Frontier and become part of the NUNS forces. Meanwhile, Ranka, "Ai-kun" and Brera find a protoculture planet near the center of the galaxy, where the Vajra apparently come from.
23	"True Beginning"; Transliteration: "Turū Bigin" (Japanese: トゥルー·ビギン)	September 11, 2008
Due to insufficient resources in the Frontier Fleet, food is being rationed. As even oxygen is being lowered inside the colony. Alto, as he had promised, is taking care of Sheryl. They shared a peaceful dinner together that Alto prepared. Later, Alto receives a detailed briefing from SMS owner Richard Bilrer and Mishima about the nature of the Vajra, the power behind Ranka's song and the threats they pose to Frontier's survival. Meanwhile, Brera and Ranka arrive at the Vajra home system. Despite her efforts to show that she is peaceful, the Vajras led by Ai-Kun capture Ranka while she realizes that Brera is in fact her real brother. While fighting his way towards Ranka, Brera encounters O'Connor and she tells him also that Ranka is his biological sister, but then takes total control over him using an obedience override in his cybernetic implants. The fold waves from Ranka's song are detected by both Macross Quarter and the Frontier Fleet. Having pinpointed the location of the Vajra home system thanks to Ranka's song, both the Macross Quarter and the Frontier fleet travel toward it. Mishima becomes the 5th president of the Macross Frontier Fleet and convinces the population that the only way the fleet can survive now is by annihilating the Vajra and claiming the homeworld of the enemies as their own.
24	"Last Frontier"; Transliteration: "Rasuto Furontia" (Japanese: ラスト·フロンティア)	September 18, 2008
The members of S.M.S Macross Quarter investigate the truth behind the destruction of the 117th Large Scale Research fleet in a Vajra attack and Ozma finds the shadow of O'Connor's ambition present in the incident where Ranka lost her family. A photo also confirms that Sheryl is Mao Nome's biological grand-daughter. Meanwhile, the NUNS military forces of Frontier prepare for a final decisive battle to protect the fleet from the Vajra. Alto visits Sheryl before the battle and promised that he will come back to her alive, but Sheryl interrupts him with a kiss. She then begs Alto to save Ranka and gives him her last fold quartz earring. The Macross Frontier fleet finally arrives at the Vajra home system and starts its final attack by successfully destroying a large portion of the enemy using "Dimension Eater" weapons. However, O'Connor connects to the Vajra fold network and manipulates Ranka into leading all the Vajra against the Frontier fleet with her singing, which also enhances their effectiveness in battle. Alto's VF-171EX is destroyed by Brera's VF-27 while Sheryl watches helplessly from the stage at the Battle Frontier bridge.
25	"The Sound Of You"; Transliteration: "Anata no Oto" (Japanese: アナタノオト)	September 25, 2008
While the Frontier fleet continues its fight against the Vajra the Macross Quarter arrives and saves Battle Frontier from an enemy attack. Captain Wilder reveals evidence that proves how leaders of Macross Galaxy fleet were behind Vajra attacks on Macross Frontier fleet and that Mishima was conspiring with them. Alto manages to contact the fleet to reveal that while fighting Brera, he managed to see the true enemy inside the giant hologram of Ranka. Having escaped death by ejecting from his VF-171EX, Alto tells the Macross Quarter crew to fire at said hologram. After the Quarter shoots it, it reveals the military flagship of the Macross Galaxy fleet, Battle Galaxy, proving that it was the true faction behind the Vajra attacks. The combined Galaxy/Vajra forces start attacking again and Island One, the main residential area of the Frontier fleet receives a fierce counterattack, becoming endangered. During the battle, Alto learns of Ranka's true situation and spurs Sheryl to help him wake her from her trance. O'Connor becomes fully connected to the Vajra Queen and starts attacking the Frontier forces with it. Frontier forces begin to falter under the sheer firepower of the Vajra and their coordination with O'Connor's control over the Queen's body and her drones. However, Ranka now freed of O'Connor's influence begins to sing and disrupts O'Connor's control of the Vajra through her songs. Ranka is rescued by Alto from Battle Galaxy where she was being held captive. Ranka then moves the V-type infection from Sheryl's brain into her abdomen, saving her life. Ranka and Sheryl start singing together and take the Vajra out of O'Connor's control. She makes an all-out attempt to destroy Island one, but the attack is blocked by all the Vajra who have been freed from her influence, many of them sacrificing themselves in the process. Brera and Alto fight together, eventually defeating O'Connor by severing the Vajra Queen's head and Alto using Michael's sniper rifle on her. The Vajra Queen once freed from O'Connor's control begins to sing the Aimo song that Ranka claims is a Vajra love song as all Vajra depart from the regions they were attacking. In the end the Macross Frontier fleet lands on the Vajra planet, where all the characters reunite. Note: it is the only episode title entirely in Japanese, albeit it is written in katakana.
