= List of Senegalese women writers =

This is a list of women writers who were born in Senegal or whose writings are closely associated with that country.

== B ==
- Mariama Bâ (1929–1981), French-language non-fiction writer, novelist, feminist
- Sokhna Benga (born 1967), French-language novelist, poet
- Jacqueline Fatima Bocoum (active since 2000s), French-language novelist, journalist
- Ken Bugul (born 1947), French-language novelist

== C ==
- Aïssatou Cissé (born c.1970), novelist, political advisor

== D ==
- Nafissatou Niang Diallo (1941–1982), French-language novelist, autobiographer
- Nafissatou Dia Diouf (born 1973), French-language short-story writer, novelist, children's writer
- Aïssatou Diamanka-Besland (born 1972), French-language essayist, novelist, journalist
- Mame Younousse Dieng (1939–2016), Wolof-language novelist, poet
- Fatou Diome (born 1968), French-language novelist, short story writer

== F ==
- Khadi Fall (born 1948), novelist, former government minister
- Kiné Kirama Fall (born 1934), French-language poet

== H ==
- Khady Hane (born 1962), French-language novelist, playwright

== K ==
- Aminata Maïga Ka (1950–2005), novelist

== M ==
- Annette Mbaye d'Erneville (born 1926), French-language poet, children's writer
- Ndèye Coumba Mbengue Diakhaté (1924–2001), French-language poet, educator
- Penda Mbow (born 1955), historian, non-fiction writer
- Diana Mordasini (active since 1990s), journalist, novelist

== N ==
- Mariama Ndoye (born 1953), French-language novelist, short story writer

== S ==
- Fama Diagne Sène (born 1969), French-language novelist, poet
- Fatou Niang Siga (1932–2022), French-language essayist
- Aminata Sow Fall (born 1941), French-language novelist, consider the first published novelist from French Black Africa
- Fatou Ndiaye Sow (1956–2004), poet, children's writer
- Khady Sylla (1963–2013), novelist, short story writer, filmmaker

== T ==
- Rama Thiaw (born 1978), screenwriter
- Myriam Warner-Vieyra (1939–2017), Guadeloupean-born Senegalese novelist, poet

== Y ==
- Rama Yade (born 1976), politician, non-fiction writer
