= Women in Senegal =

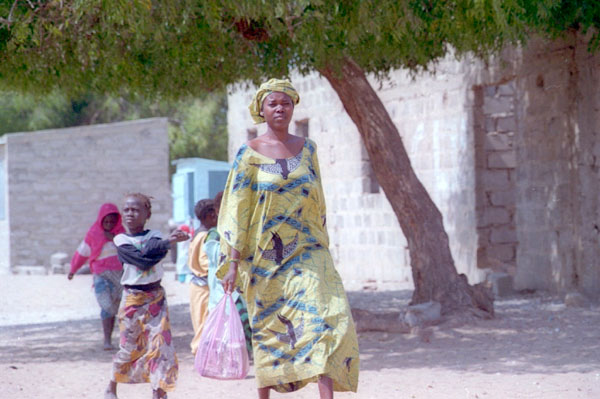
- Senegalese women

General statistics
- Maternal mortality (per 100,000): 370 (2010)
- Women in parliament: 41.6% (2012)
- Women over 25 with secondary education: 4.6% (2010)
- Women in labour force: 66.1% (2011)

Gender Inequality Index
- Value: 0.530 (2021)
- Rank: 131st out of 191

Global Gender Gap Index
- Value: 0.670 (2022)
- Rank: 112th out of 146

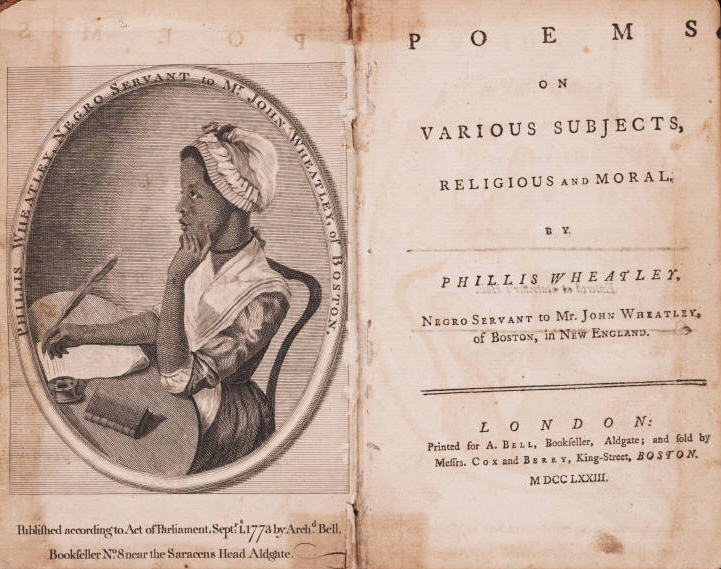
Poet Phyllis Wheatley, born in Senegal and sold as a slave in Boston in 1761.

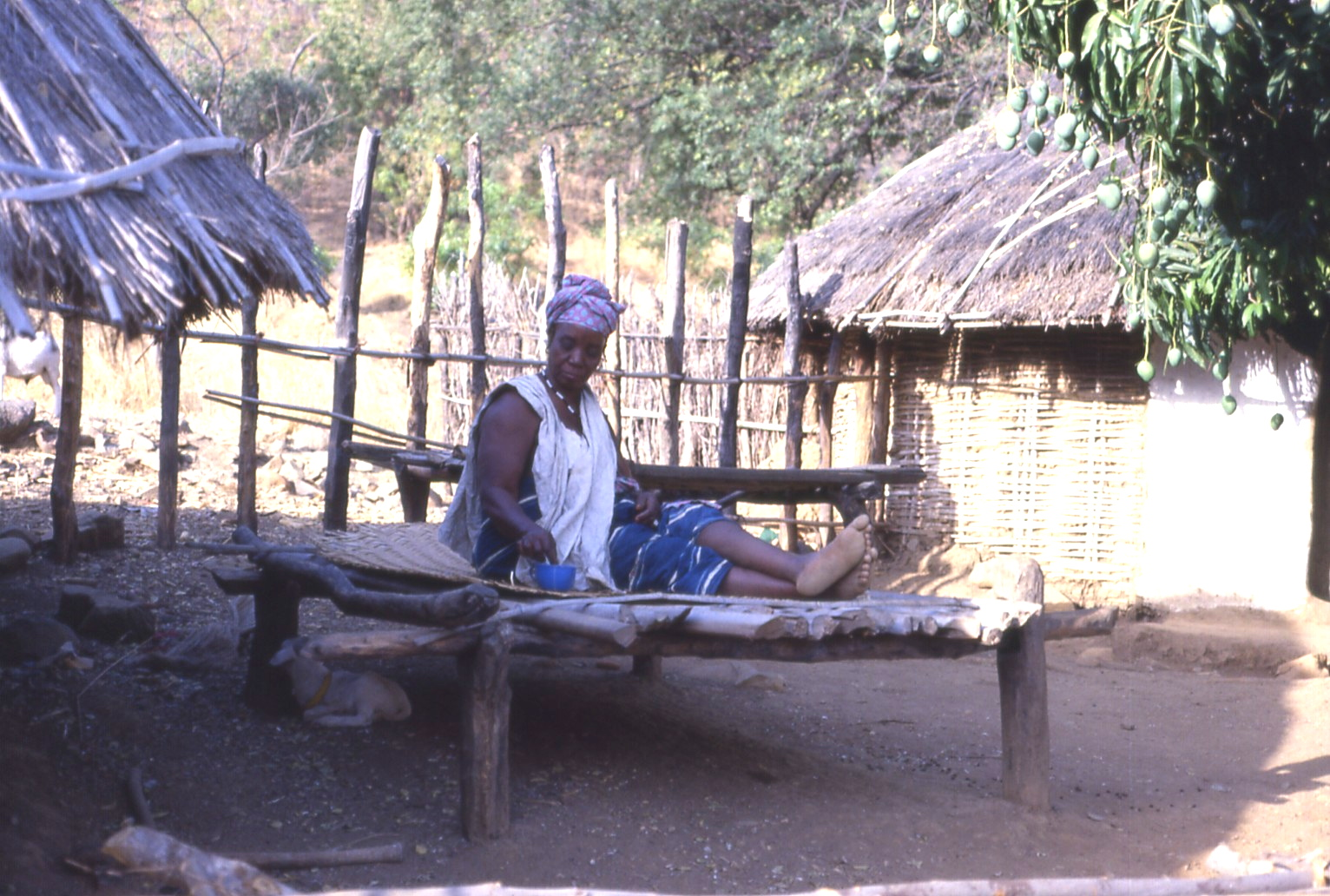
A Matriarch in Ibel, Senegal.

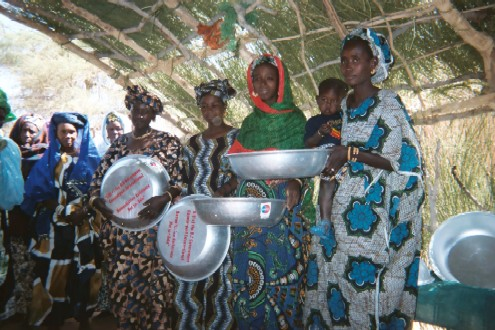
Senegalese cuisine.

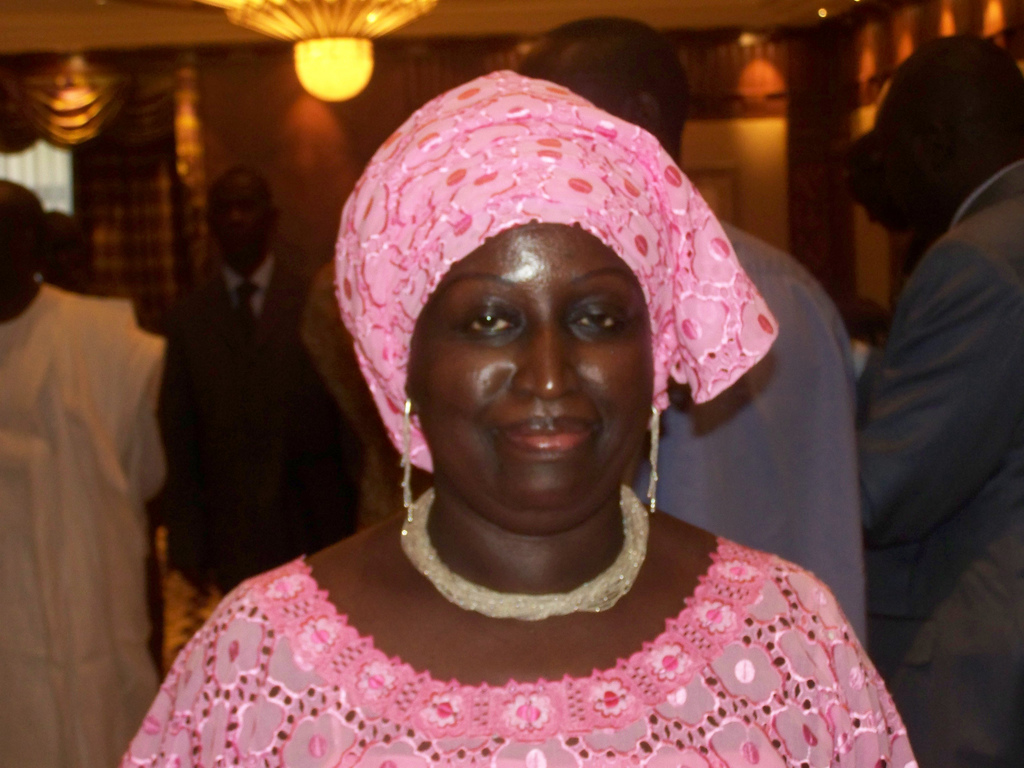
Penda Mbow, historian and activist.

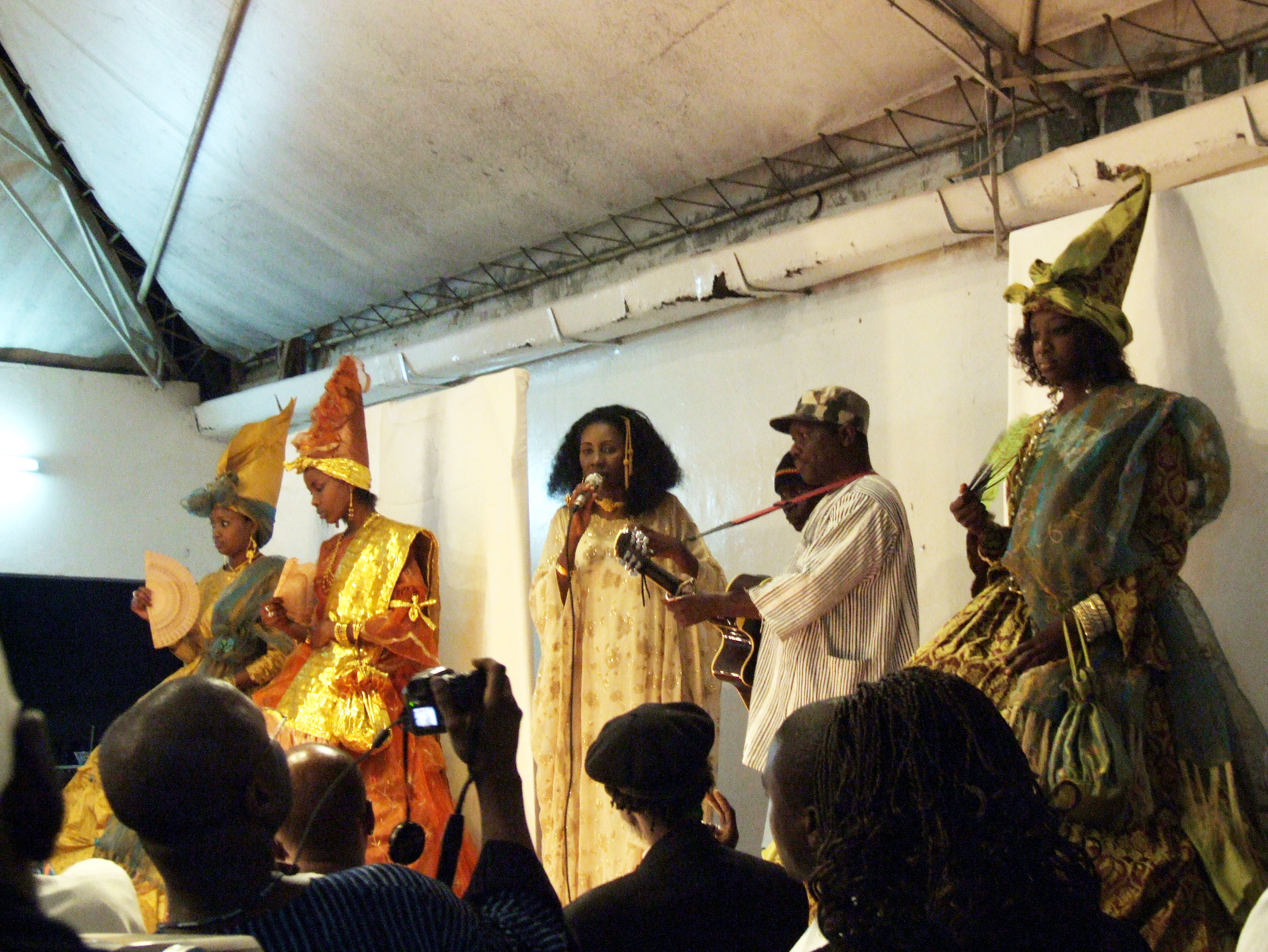
Stylist Oumou Sy in Dakar in 2007.

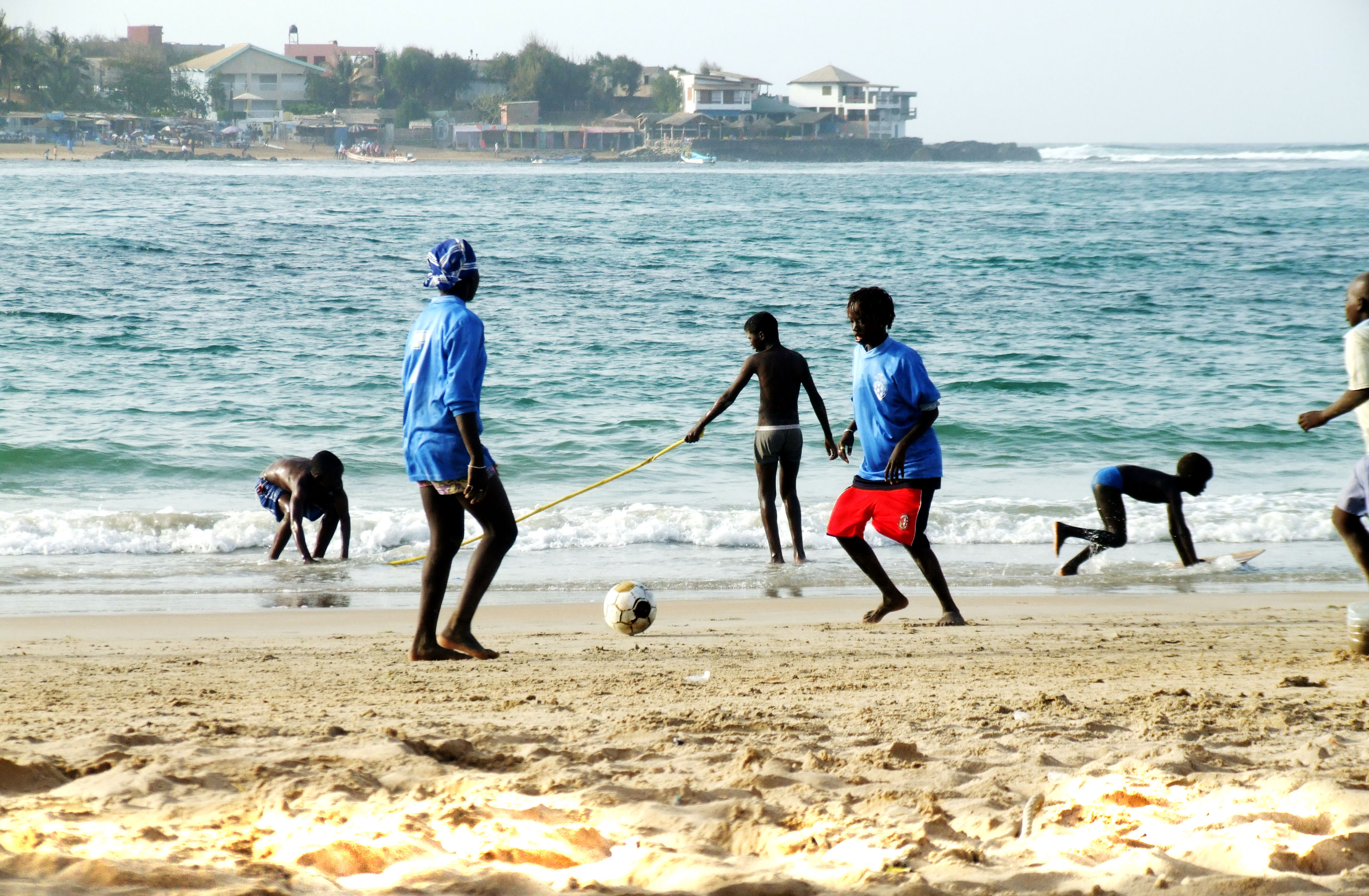
Football players on the beach at Ngor

Women in Senegal have a traditional social status as shaped by local custom and religion. According to 2005 survey, the female genital mutilation prevalence rate stands at twenty-eight percent (28%) of all women in Senegal aged between 15 and 49.

== History ==
The traditional division of labour in Senegal saw women responsible for household tasks such as cooking, cleaning, and childcare. They were also responsible for a large share of agricultural work, including weeding and harvesting, for such common crops as rice. Women of the nobility used to be influential in political scenes. This is partly because matrilineage was the means for a prince to become king (particularly in the Wolof kingdoms). Such lingeer as Yacine Boubou, Ndate Yalla and her sister Njembeut Mbodji are hailed as inspirations for contemporary Senegalese women.

In recent decades, economic change and urbanization has led to many young men migrating to the cities, such as Dakar. Rural women have become increasingly involved in managing village forestry resources and operating millet and rice mills. The government's rural development agency aims to organize village women and involve them more actively in the development process. Women play a prominent role in village health committees and prenatal and postnatal programs. In urban areas, despite women's second-class status within Islam, cultural change has led to women entering the labour market as office and retail clerks, domestic workers and unskilled workers in textile mills and tuna-canning factories.

Non-government organizations are also active in promoting women's economic opportunities. Micro-financing loans for women's businesses have improved the economic situation of many.

Senegal ratified the Convention on the Elimination of All Forms of Discrimination Against Women, adopted by the United Nations General Assembly, as well as the additional protocol. Senegal is also a signatory of the African Charter of Human and People's Rights, which was adopted during the 2003 African Union Summit. As of 2011, Senegalese feminists were critical of the government's lack of action in enforcing the protocols, conventions and other texts that legally protect women's rights. Similar criticisms were made in the 2020s by analysts and feminists who stated that everyday practices and customs in Senegal typically maintain a patriarchal character. Similarly, Afrobarometer found that Senegalese women often remain in a disadvantaged position.

== Women's rights ==
Women in Senegal face a number of disparities in their social status. Women have high rates of illiteracy. They make up less than 10% of the formal labour force. Female genital mutilation is a persistent practise in some rural areas, despite being outlawed by the constitution of 2001. Women's legal rights are similar via polygyny marriages, and Islamic law involving property ownership.

=== Female genital mutilation ===
Female genital mutilation is present in Senegal. According to 2005 survey, the FGM prevalence rate is 28% of all women aged between 15 and 49. There are significant differences in regional prevalence. FGM is most widespread in the Southern Senegal (94% in Kolda Region) and in Northeastern Senegal (93% in Matam Region).

FGM rates are lower in other regions: Tambacounda (86%), Ziguinchor (69%), and less than 5% in Diourbel and Louga Regions. Senegal is 94% Muslim (FGM is not an Islamic practice) The FGM prevalence rate varies by religion: 29% of Muslim women have undergone FGM, 16% of Animists, and 11% of Christian women.

== Notable people ==
=== Activists ===
- Binta Sarr

=== Religious figures ===
- Mame Diarra Bousso

=== Female politicians ===
- Ndoumbe Ndiaye – Thioumbe Samb – Mame Yacine Diagne – Aline Sitoé Diatta – Arame Diene – Caroline Faye – Anne Marie Sohai – Lena Diagne – Awa Dia Thiam – Mame Madior Boye – Marie-Angélique Savané – Awa Marie Coll Seck – Aminata Tall – Ndaté Yalla – Aminata Mbengue Ndiaye – Penda Mbow – Safiatou Thiam – Aïda Mbodj – Ndeye Fatou Ba – Lena Diagne – Gnagna Thouré – Arame Ndoye – Boye Baby

=== Scientists ===
- Awa Marie Coll Seck – Rose Dieng-Kuntz – Penda Mbow – Safiatou Thiam

=== Female writers ===
- Mariama Bâ – Mariama Barry – Ndèye Coumba Mbengue Diakhaté – Sokhna Benga – Jacqueline Fatima Bocoum – Ken Bugul – Aïssatou Cissé – Fama Diagne Sène – Nafissatou Niang Diallo – Aïssatou Diamanka-Besland – Mame Younousse Dieng – Fatou Diome – Khadi Fall – Khadi Hane – Aminata Maïga Ka – Ndèye Fatou Kane – Annette Mbaye d'Erneville – Aminata Sow Fall – Fatou Ndiaye Sow – Mariama Ndoye – Mame Seck Mbacké – Khady Sylla – Abibatou Traoré- Rahmatou Seck Samb – Nafissatou Dia Diouf - Mame Diarra Beye

=== Filmmakers ===
- Laurence Attali – Angèle Diabang Brener – Safi Faye – Dyana Gaye – Khady Sylla – Aïcha Thiam – Sokhna Amar

=== Stylists ===
- Oumou Sy – Koukou Kane – Collé Ardo Sow – Adama Paris – Diouma Dieng Diakhaté – Joelle Le Bussy – Nafissatou Diop

=== Choreographers ===
- Germaine Acogny

=== Singers ===
- Fambaye Issa Diop – Adja Mbana Diop – Adja Khar Mbaye – Coumba Gawlo Seck – Diarra – Viviane Ndour -Diabou Samb -Kine Lam – Daro Mbaye – Ndeye Mbaye

=== Athletes ===
- Senegal women's national basketball team
- Kene Ndoye – Amy Mbacké Thiam

=== Others ===
- Oulimata Sarr

== See also ==
- Levirate marriage
- Health in Senegal
- Education in Senegal
- Women in Africa

== Bibliography ==
- (in German) Bettina Marcinowski, Die Frau in Afrika : Unters. zum schwarzafrikan. frankophonen Roman Kameruns u. Senegals, Francfort et Berne, Lang, 1982, 246 p. (version abrégée d'une thèse de l'Université de Fribourg, 1981 ISBN 3-8204-7237-1
- Isabelle Guérin, « Women and Money: Lessons from Senegal », Development and Change, 2006, 37 (3), p. 549–570.
- Lisa McNee, Selfish Gifts: Senegalese Women's Autobiographical Discourses, State University of New York, 2000, 197 p. ISBN 0-7914-4587-9
- Kathleen Sheldon, Historical Dictionary of Women in Sub-Saharan Africa, The Scarecrow Press, Inc., 2005, 448 p.
- (in French) Philippe Antoine et Jeanne Nanitelamio, Peut-on échapper à la polygamie à Dakar ?, Paris, CEPED, 1995, 31 p. ISBN 2-87762-077-8
- (in French) Femmes en politique : l'expérience dans cinq pays : Sénégal, Bénin, Burkina Faso, Cameroun, Mali, Dakar, Éditions Démocraties africaines, 1999 ou 2000, 151 p.
- (in French) Philippe Antoine et Jeanne Nanitelamio, Peut-on échapper à la polygamie à Dakar ?, Paris, CEPED, 1995, 31 p. ISBN 2-87762-077-8
- (in French) Hélène Bouchard et Chantal Rondeau, Commerçantes et épouses à Dakar et Bamako. La réussite par le commerce, Paris, L'Harmattan, 2007, 436 p. ISBN 978-2-296-03733-5
- (in French) May Clarkson, La femme Bedik. Mariage et procréation, approche ethno-démographique à un problème de micro-évolution, Université de Montréal, 1977 (M.Sc.)
- (in French) Katy Cissé Wone, « Le passé politique des femmes : une trajectoire ambiguë », Démocraties africaines, n° 5, 1996/03, p. 47-51
- (in French) Marina Co Trung Yung, Des enquêtes sur la participation des femmes sénégalaises à la vie politique de 1945 à 1960, Paris, Université de Paris I, 1980 (Diplôme d'Etudes Approfondies)
- (in French) Sidy Diallo, Contribution à l'étude du phénomène de la migration au Sénégal : les jeunes filles sereer et diola à Dakar, Dakar, Université de Dakar, 1981, 104 p. (Mémoire de Maîtrise)
- (in French) Nafissatou Diop, La fécondité des adolescentes au Sénégal, Université de Montréal, 1993 (thèse)
- (in French) Adama Diouf, L’éducation des filles dans les quatre communes fin du XIXe-1920. Le cas de Rufisque, Université de Dakar, 1998, 103 p. (Mémoire de Maîtrise)
- (in French) Hadiza Djibo, La participation des femmes africaines à la vie politique : les exemples du Sénégal et du Niger, Paris, L'Harmattan, 2002, 426 p. ISBN 2-7475-0330-5
- (in French) Colette Le Cour Grandmaison, Rôles traditionnels féminins et urbanisation. Lébou et wolof de Dakar, Paris, EPHE, 1970, 4+310+23 p. (Thèse de 3e cycle, publiée en 1972 sous le titre "Femmes dakaroises : rôles traditionnels féminins et urbanisation", Abidjan, Annales de l'Université d'Abidjan, 249 p.)
- (in French) Awa Kane Ly, La femme haal-pulaar au Fuuta Tooro, Dakar, Université de Dakar, 1980, 158 p. (Mémoire de Maîtrise)
- (in French) Khalifa Mbengue, Stratégies de communication en planification familiale : Campagne d'information Sénégal (1988–1989), Université de Montréal, 1993 (MSc.)
- (in French) Gora Mboup, Étude des déterminants socio-économiques et culturels de la fécondité au Sénégal à partir de l'enquête sénégalaise sur la fécondité (ESF, 1978) et l'enquête démographique et de santé (EDS, 1986), Université de Montréal, 1993 (thèse)
- (in French) Maty Ndiaye et Marina Co Trung Yung, La condition des femmes colonisées du Sénégal et du Soudan français, Paris, Université de Paris VIII, 1979, 413 p. (Mémoire de Maîtrise)
- (in French) Oumy K. Ndiaye, Femmes sérères et projets de développement : exemple de la diffusion des foyers améliorés dans le Département de Fatick, Sénégal, Université Laval, 1988 (M.A.)
- (in French) Abdou Karim Ndoye, Facteurs socio-économiques et réussite scolaire des filles en fin d'enseignement élémentaire : cas de deux régions du Sénégal, Dakar?, Rapport d'étude UEPA, 2002, 136 p. ISBN 2-910115-27-5
- (in French) Mame Fama Niang, Situation de la femme musulmane au Sénégal, Dakar, Université de Dakar, 1979, 95 p. (Mémoire de Maîtrise)
- (in French) Dauphine Ravololomanikara, Le rôle et la place de la femme dans quelques romans sénégalais, University of British Columbia, 1974 (M.A.)
- (in French) Ahmed Rufa'i, L'image de la femme africaine dans l'œuvre d'Ousmane Sembène, Université de Sherbrooke, 1983 (M.A.)
- (in French) Marie-Angélique Savané, Les projets pour les femmes en milieu rural au Sénégal, Genève, Bureau International du Travail, 1983, 139 p. ISBN 92-2-203394-9
- (in French) F. Sow, Le pouvoir économique des femmes dans le département de Podor, Saint-Louis, SAED, 1990
- (in French) F. Sow, (sous la direction de), Les femmes sénégalaises à l'horizon 2015, Dakar, Ministère de la Femme, de l'Enfant et de la Famille, République du Sénégal, 1993
- (in French) Papa Sow, « Les récolteuses de sel du lac Rose (Sénégal) : Histoire d'une innovation sociale féminine », Géographie et cultures, 2002, n° 41, p. 93-113

=== Filmography ===
- (in French) Traumatisme de la femme face à la polygamie (Ousmane Sembène, 1969)
- (in French) Moolaadé (Ousmane Sembène, 2004)
- (in French) Mon beau sourire (Angèle Diabang Brener, 2005)
- (in French) Sénégalaises et islam (Angèle Diabang Brener, (2007)
