= Sadio Mané =

Senegalese footballer (born 1992)

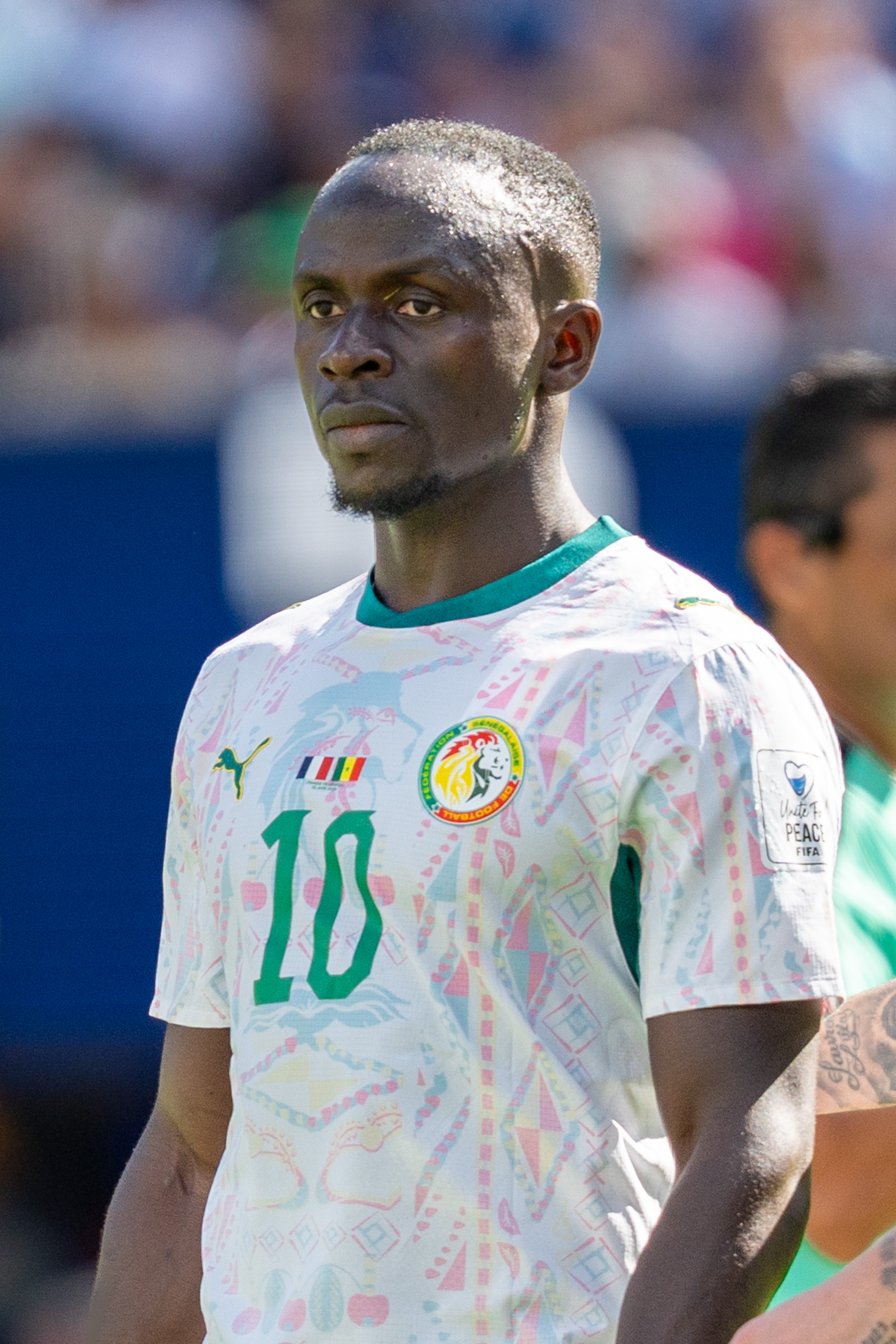
- Mané with Senegal in 2026

Personal information
- Full name: Sadio Mané
- Date of birth: 10 April 1992 (age 34)
- Place of birth: Bambali, Senegal
- Height: 1.75 m (5 ft 9 in)
- Position: Left winger

Team information
- Current team: Al-Nassr
- Number: 10

Youth career
- 2009–2011: Génération Foot

Senior career*
Years	Team	Apps	(Gls)
2011–2012	Metz B	12	(2)
2011–2012	Metz	22	(2)
2012–2014	Red Bull Salzburg	63	(31)
2014–2016	Southampton	67	(21)
2016–2022	Liverpool	196	(90)
2022–2023	Bayern Munich	25	(7)
2023–	Al-Nassr	100	(40)

International career^{‡}
2012	Senegal Olympic	4	(0)
2012–	Senegal	134	(56)
Medal record
Men's football
Representing Senegal
Africa Cup of Nations
Winner	2021 Cameroon
Runner-up	2019 Egypt
Runner-up	2025 Morocco
- * Club domestic league appearances and goals as of 21:00, 29 October 2026 (UTC) ‡ National team caps and goals as of 22:10, 1 July 2026 (UTC)

Sadio Mané (born 10 April 1992) is a Senegalese professional footballer who plays as a left winger for Saudi Pro League club Al-Nassr and the Senegal national team. He is widely regarded as one of the best wingers of his generation and one of the greatest African players of all time. (Note: Attributed to multiple sources:)

Mané began his professional career with Ligue 2 club Metz at the age of 19, but he departed after a solitary season to join Austrian club Red Bull Salzburg in 2012 for a fee of €4 million, winning a league and cup domestic double in the 2013–14 season. Later that summer, Mané transferred to English club Southampton for a club record fee of £11.8 million. There, he set a new Premier League record for the fastest hat-trick, scored in 176 seconds in a 6–1 win over Aston Villa in 2015.

Mané signed for fellow Premier League club Liverpool in 2016, for a reported fee of £34 million, making him the most expensive African player in history at that time. Having formed a formidable attacking trio with Mohamed Salah and Roberto Firmino after the departure of prolific midfielder Philippe Coutinho, he helped the side reach back-to-back UEFA Champions League finals in 2018 and 2019, winning the latter. He also finished as the league's joint-top goalscorer in the 2018–19 season, winning the Premier League Golden Boot. Mané then helped end Liverpool's 30-year league title drought by winning the 2019–20 Premier League. In October 2021, he scored his 100th Premier League goal, becoming the third African to reach the landmark. Mané finished fourth and second in the 2019 and 2022 editions of the Ballon d'Or, respectively; and in The Best FIFA Men's Player he ranked fifth in 2019 and fourth in 2020.

At international level, Mané has registered 56 goals in 134 caps for Senegal since his debut in 2012, and currently ranks as his nation's all-time top goalscorer, and second in all-time appearances. He represented Senegal at the 2012 Olympics, as well as the 2015, 2017, 2019, 2021, 2023 and 2025 editions of the Africa Cup of Nations. In the 2019 tournament, Mané helped Senegal to a runners-up finish, and a year later, was named African Footballer of the Year. In the 2021 final, Mané scored the winning kick in the penalty shoot-out to give Senegal their first Africa Cup of Nations title, and was also named the Player of the Tournament. In 2022, he was crowned African Player of the Year for the second time. Mané would lead Senegal to a third AFCON final in 2025, once again being named the tournament's best player. Mané also represented his nation at the FIFA World Cup in 2018, the nation's second-ever appearance in the competition, and 2026, but missed the 2022 tournament due to injury.

== Early life ==
"When I was young my dad was always saying how proud he was of me.. he was a man with a big heart. When he died, it had a big impact on me and the rest of my family. I said to myself: Now I have to do my best to help my mother. That's a hard thing to deal with when you are so young."

— Mané on the impact his father's death had on him.

Mané was born to Guinean parents in Bambali, Sédhiou, Senegal. He grew up in a religious household. He wished for a career in football, but his father (who was an imam) forbade him from playing the sport as a child. His father wanted him to prioritize his religious studies, however, his father died when he was seven years old. At the age of 15, he ran away from his home village with the help of a childhood friend, Luc Djiboune, and went to Dakar to pursue his ambition of becoming a footballer; from that time he was supported by his family to fulfill his potential.

== Club career ==
=== Early career ===
In 2009, when playing in M'Bour, he was spotted by scouts and later referred to Génération Foot, a club that he helped attain promotion to the second division in the 2010–11 season.

=== Metz ===
In 2011, Mané joined Metz which had a partnership with Génération Foot. He made his professional debut on 14 January 2012, coming on as a substitute for Kévin Diaz in the 75th minute of a 0–1 home defeat against Bastia in Ligue 2. He made 19 appearances in his first league season, 12 as a starter, and scored a solitary goal in a 2–5 loss to Guingamp at the Stade Saint-Symphorien on 4 May. Metz was relegated to the Championnat National at the end of the season.

=== Red Bull Salzburg ===
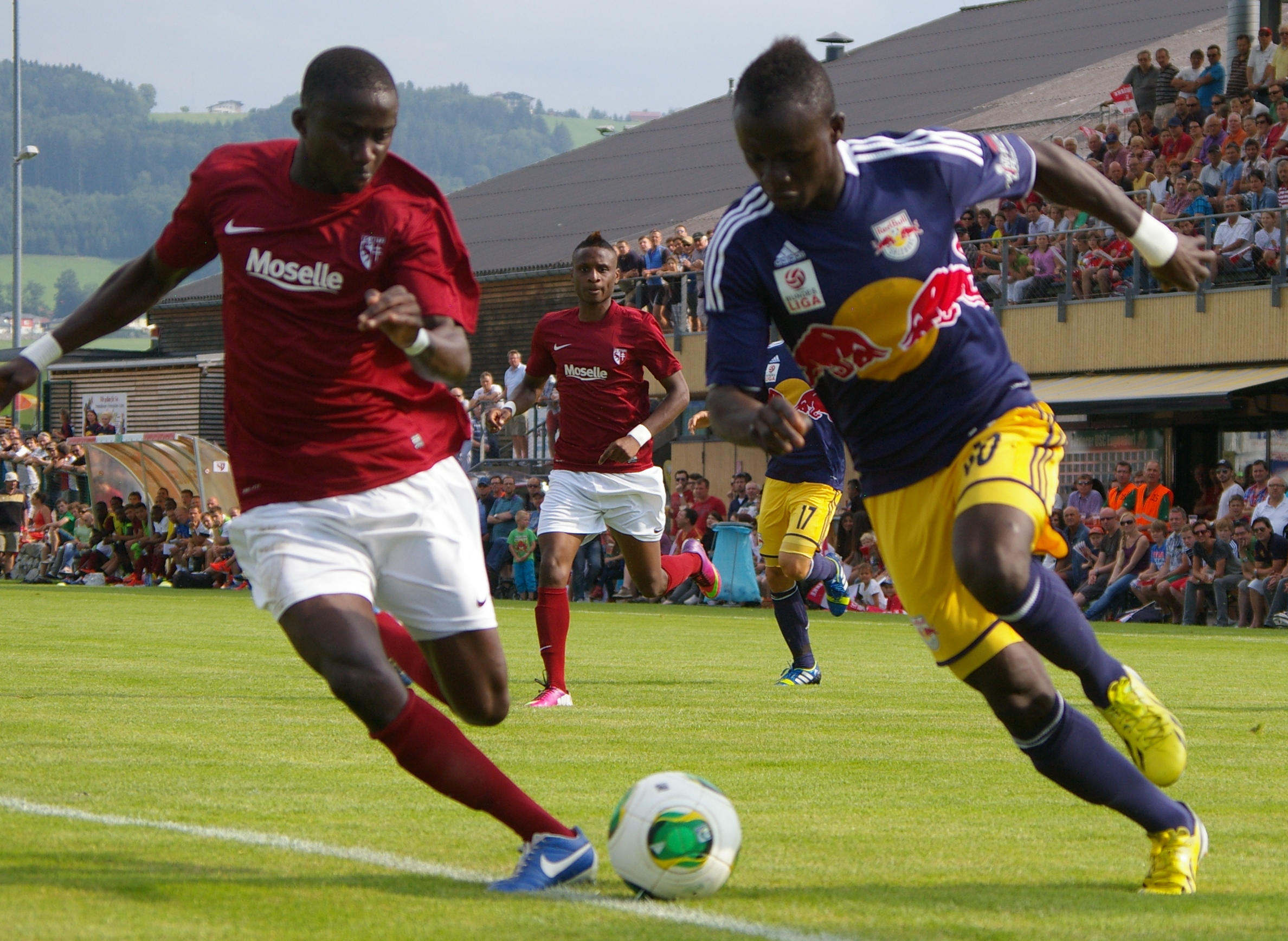
Mané (right) playing for Red Bull Salzburg in 2013

Metz set an asking price of €2 million for Mané, and he attracted attention, including from Austrian Bundesliga side Red Bull Salzburg sporting director Ralf Rangnick. Having received several offers throughout the summer, Metz upped their asking price to €4 million, and he moved to Salzburg on 31 August 2012, the third-biggest transfer fee that Metz had ever received.

He scored his first hat-trick for the club on 31 October, in a 3–1 away win at SC Kalsdorf in the third round of the Austrian Cup.

On 27 October 2013, he netted his first hat-trick in the Austrian Bundesliga, during a 3–0 win away to Grödig. He scored another treble on 7 May 2014 as Salzburg won 7–0 at Horn in the cup semi-finals; the season ended with the team winning a domestic double. At the end of August 2014 Mané forced a transfer out of the club, by not coming to the training and to the most important game for Salzburg at that time to qualify for the Champions League.

=== Southampton ===
==== 2014–15 season ====
On 1 September 2014, Mané transferred to Premier League side Southampton for £11.8 million, signing a four-year contract. He made his debut 22 days later in a 2–1 League Cup victory over Arsenal, winning the penalty for Southampton's first goal. He made his first league appearance for the club in another 2–1 victory over Queens Park Rangers on 27 September, starting and assisting Ryan Bertrand for the first goal of the game. He scored his first goal for the club in an 8–0 victory over Sunderland on 18 October, although this was subsequently credited as an own goal by Patrick van Aanholt. He did, however, score his first goal in his next game, a 1–0 win over Stoke City a week later.

In December and January he scored in three successive matches, against Crystal Palace, Chelsea and Arsenal. Mané scored two late winning goals in 1–0 league victories at Queens Park Rangers on 7 February 2015 and at home to Crystal Palace on 3 March respectively. However, Mané had been dropped from Southampton's starting line-up for their 0–2 home defeat to Liverpool on 22 February as a punishment for being late to the stadium.

On 16 May, during Southampton's final home match of the season, Mané scored three times in 2 minutes 56 seconds in a 6–1 win over Aston Villa to set a new Premier League record for the fastest hat-trick. The record had been held since 1994 by Robbie Fowler, who scored three against Arsenal in 4 minutes and 33 seconds. Mané finished the season with 10 goals from 32 appearances in all competitions.

==== 2015–16 season ====
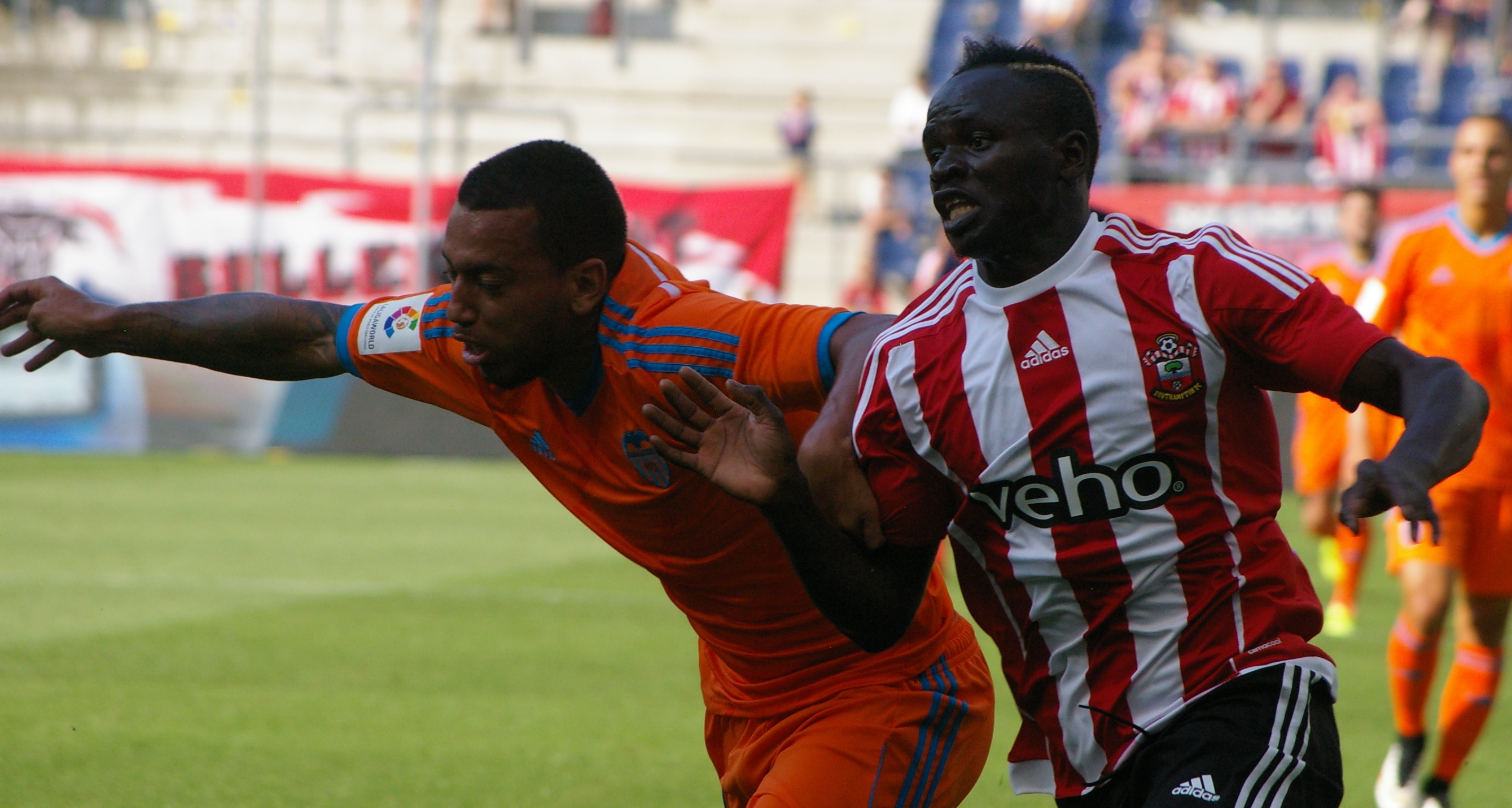
Mané (right) playing for Southampton in 2015

Mané began the 2015–16 season by registering two assists in the UEFA Europa League third qualifying round first leg match with Vitesse Arnhem at home and scoring in the return leg, as Southampton eased through to the next round 5–0 on aggregate. On 2 December, he took 39 seconds to open the scoring against Liverpool in the quarter-finals of the League Cup, but the Saints eventually lost 6–1 at home.

On 2 January 2016, he was again dropped from the starting line-up by manager Ronald Koeman for a match at Norwich City when he turned up late for a pre-match meeting. He received a straight red card on 12 March at the end of a 2–1 win at Stoke City for a collision into Erik Pieters, although this was quickly overturned on appeal.

Having failed to score in the league for over four months, Mané scored twice in a 3–2 victory over Liverpool on 20 March 2016, followed by five goals in the next five matches, including a hat-trick in a 4–2 victory against Manchester City on 1 May. He finished the season as Southampton's top scorer, with 15 goals in all competitions, including 11 in the Premier League, making him the club's joint top scorer alongside Graziano Pellè.

=== Liverpool ===
==== 2016–17 season ====
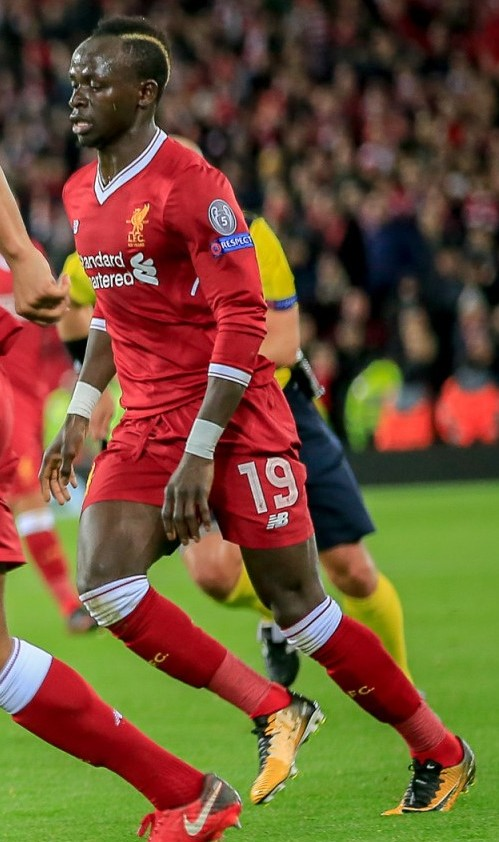
Mané playing for Liverpool in 2017

On 28 June 2016, Mané joined Liverpool for a transfer fee of £34 million (which could rise to £36 million) on a five-year contract. The transfer fee made him the most expensive African player in history at the time. On 14 August, he made his Premier League debut for the Reds, scoring the fourth goal in a 4–3 away win against Arsenal. Having missed Liverpool's defeat at Burnley through a slight shoulder injury, Mané returned to the starting line-up against Burton Albion in the League Cup where he had two assists in a 5–0 win.

On 19 December, Mané scored the only goal of the 227th Merseyside derby in added time against Everton at Goodison Park. On 11 February 2017, Mané scored two goals within two minutes against Tottenham Hotspur at Anfield, for Liverpool's first league win in 2017. On 20 April 2017, Mané was named in the PFA Team of the Year after scoring 13 league goals in his first season with Liverpool. Despite missing the latter part of the campaign through injury, Mané was awarded the Liverpool Player of the Season award on 9 May 2017.

==== 2017–18 season ====
In the first match of the new season, on 12 August 2017, away to Watford, Mané scored Liverpool's first goal of the season in a 3–3 draw. He was named Premier League Player of the Month after scoring a goal in each of the Reds' three matches in August. On 9 September 2017, he was given a straight red card in the first half of a 5–0 loss to Manchester City for a high boot against goalkeeper Ederson, resulting in a three-match ban. Mané, Mohamed Salah, Roberto Firmino and Philippe Coutinho made up a prolific attacking quartet dubbed the "Fab Four" and "Fab Three" after the mid-season exit of the latter.

On 14 February 2018, Mané scored his first hat-trick for Liverpool in a 5–0 away win against Porto in the round of 16 first leg of the 2017–18 UEFA Champions League. In doing so, he became only the second player to score an away hat-trick for the club in Europe. Later, with a goal in the 3–0 win over AFC Bournemouth on 14 April, he overtook Demba Ba's record of 43 to become the highest scoring Senegalese in Premier League history.

On 26 May, during the 2018 UEFA Champions League final against Real Madrid, Mané scored Liverpool's equalising goal in a 3–1 defeat. In doing so, he became the first Senegalese player to score in the final of the competition. His goal was also his 10th for the campaign which saw Liverpool become the first team in history to have three players score 10+ goals in a single Champions League season, with Mané achieving the milestone alongside fellow forwards Salah and Firmino.

==== 2018–19 season ====
On 22 November 2018, Mané signed a new long-term deal with Liverpool. On 10 March 2019, Mané scored twice in a 4–2 win over Burnley, the second of which was his 50th competitive goal for Liverpool. His goals also saw him become only the fifth Liverpool player to score in six consecutive home Premier League appearances after Michael Owen, Fernando Torres, Luis Suárez and Salah. Three days later, he scored twice more in a 3–1 win over Bayern Munich to help Liverpool progress to the quarter-finals of the Champions League. In doing so, he became the club's record goalscorer away from home in the competition with seven goals to his name. During Liverpool's next match, he broke another of Ba's records to become the Senegalese player with the most goals scored in a single Premier League season, after scoring his 17th goal for the campaign in a 2–1 win over Fulham. On 20 April, he was one of six players nominated for the PFA Players' Player of the Year award alongside teammate Virgil van Dijk. He was also named in the PFA Team of the Year alongside Liverpool teammates, Trent Alexander-Arnold, Andrew Robertson and Van Dijk.

"What makes him special is that he never stops believing… in the meeting before the game he was really convinced that we could do it. Even though we were missing two of the best players in the world [Salah and Roberto Firmino]. He pushed the boys hard to give everything possible and tried to take the pressure off us."

— Mané on the impact his manager Jürgen Klopp had on him and the whole Liverpool squad to inspire them to a famous Champions League comeback against Barcelona in the semi-finals.

On the final day of the domestic campaign, Mané scored twice in a 2–0 win over Wolverhampton Wanderers. His brace took him to 22 goals for the campaign which saw him share the Premier League Golden Boot award with Salah and Arsenal's Pierre-Emerick Aubameyang. On 1 June, Mané helped win an early penalty for Liverpool in the 2019 UEFA Champions League final against Tottenham, only 24 seconds after the kick-off, after his cross was judged to have hit Moussa Sissoko's arm inside the penalty area; Salah subsequently converted from the spot to open the scoring, and Liverpool ultimately won the match 2–0 to claim the title.

==== 2019–20 season ====
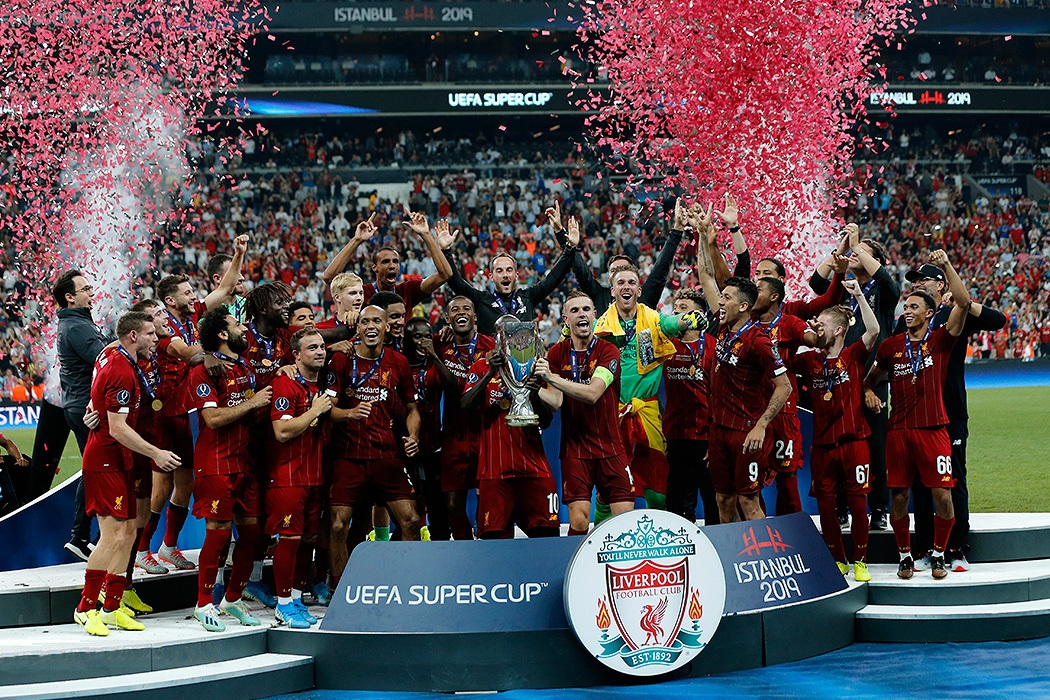
Mané lifting the UEFA Super Cup after scoring twice against Chelsea in the final.

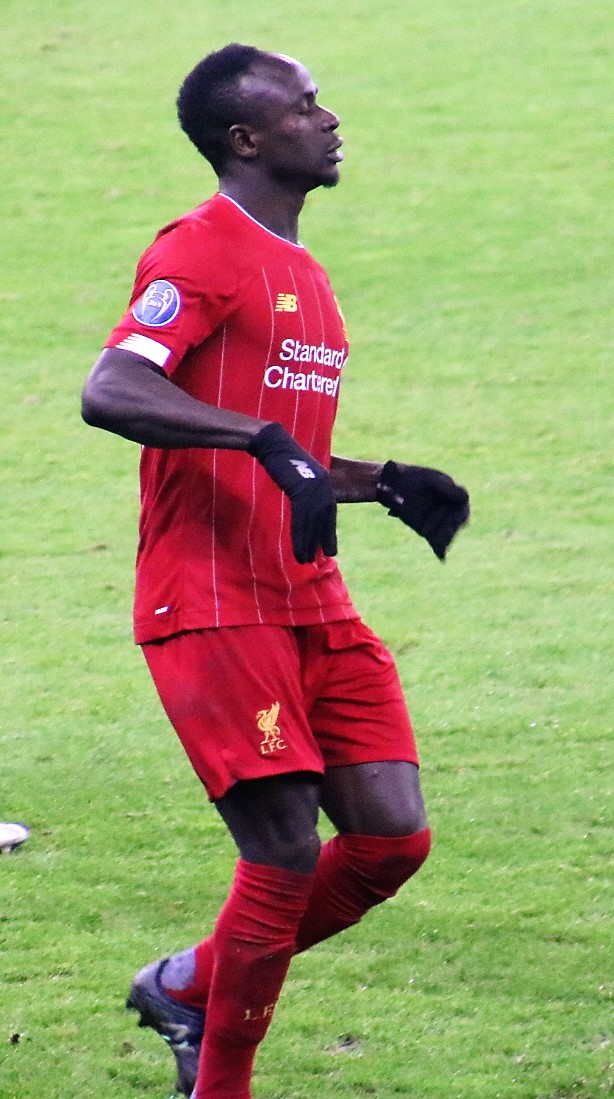
Mané playing for Liverpool in the UEFA Champions League, during December 2019

On 14 August 2019, Mané scored twice in the 2019 UEFA Super Cup final against Chelsea in a match that Liverpool won 5–4 on penalties after the game had finished 2–2 after 120 minutes. Mané was named man of the match. Exactly one month later, he scored twice in a 3–1 win over Newcastle United and extended his record run of matches without defeat for Liverpool at Anfield to 50 matches, a league record by any player at a particular stadium. On his 100th Premier League appearance for Liverpool on 5 October, Mané scored his 50th league goal for the club in a 2–1 win over Leicester City.

On 21 October, Mané was named in the 30-man shortlist for the 2019 Ballon d'Or. On 2 December he finished in fourth place for the award, behind Lionel Messi, Liverpool teammate Virgil van Dijk and Cristiano Ronaldo. Two days later, he scored once and assisted two more goals as Liverpool beat Everton 5–2 in the Merseyside derby to extend their unbeaten run in league football to 32 matches, which was a new club record. Later that month, Liverpool won the 2019 FIFA Club World Cup, with Mané setting up the winning goal scored by Firmino in the final against Flamengo.

On 7 January 2020, Mané was named the CAF African Footballer of the Year. He is only the second Senegalese (after El Hadji Diouf) to have won this award.

On 24 February, Mané scored the winner in a 3–2 home win against West Ham United in the Premier League as Liverpool made it 21 consecutive home wins, a league record shared with Bill Shankly's Liverpool team from 1972, and also made it a joint Premier League record 18 wins in a row. On 7 March, Mané scored the winning goal in a 2–1 win against Bournemouth at Anfield as Liverpool set a new English top-flight record of 22 consecutive home wins. Liverpool went on to win the Premier League title at the end of the season.

==== 2020–21 season ====
On 20 September 2020, Mané opened his scoring account in the 2020–21 Premier League with both Liverpool goals in a 2–0 win away to Chelsea. On 2 October 2020, Mané tested positive for COVID-19. Given his and Liverpool's stuttering form, Mané stated that 2020–21 had been the worst season of his career. On 23 May 2021, the final day of the League season, Mané scored a brace in a 2–0 win over Crystal Palace securing third-place for Liverpool and qualification for the next Champions League season.

==== 2021–22 season ====
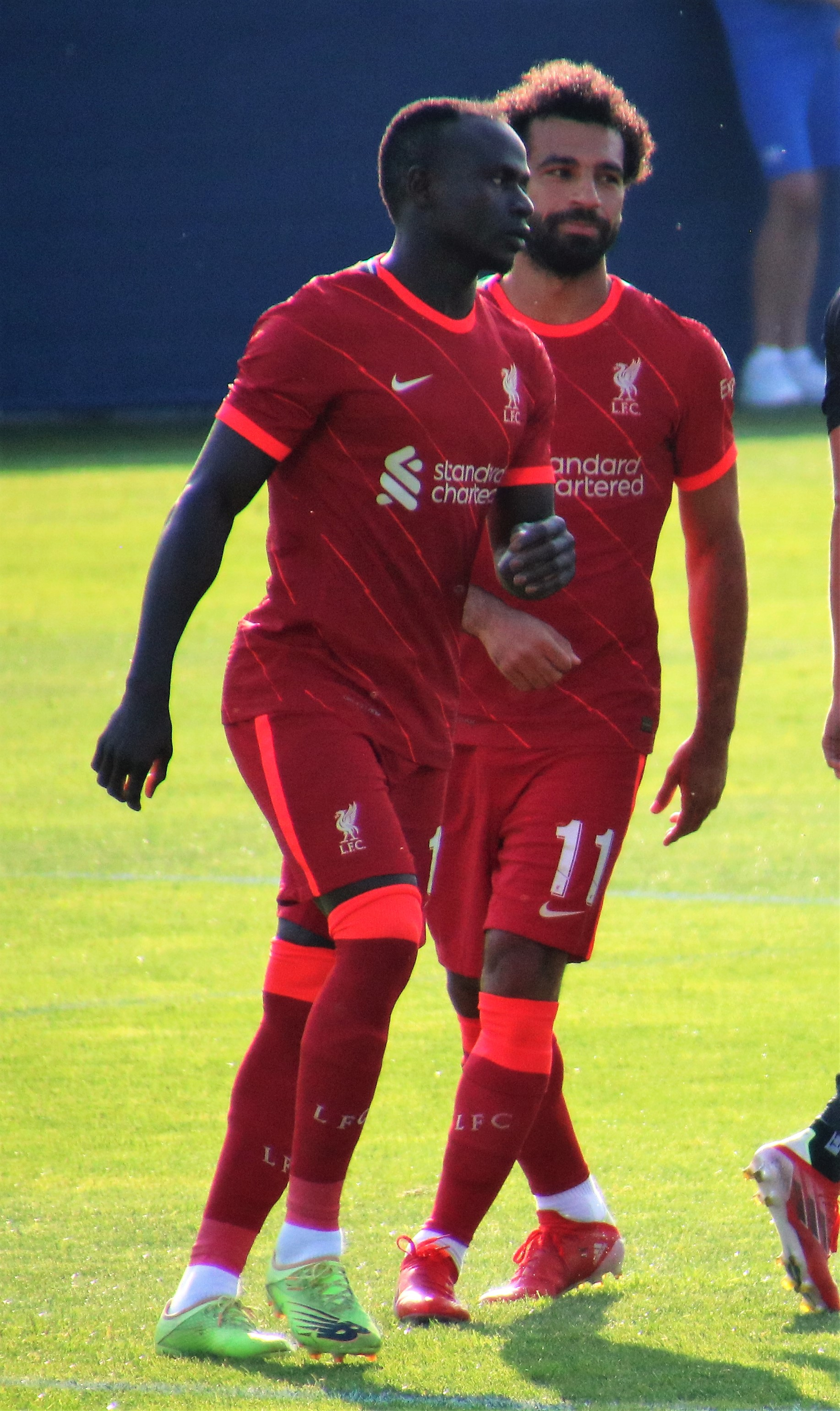
Mané and Salah during a pre-season game in 2021

On 18 September 2021, Mané scored his 100th Liverpool goal in a 3–0 home win against Crystal Palace in the Premier League. The goal against Crystal Palace also saw Mané set a new Premier League record by becoming the first player to score in nine consecutive league games against the same opponent. On 16 October, Mané scored his 100th Premier League goal—becoming the third African to reach the landmark after Didier Drogba and Salah—with Liverpool's opening goal in the 5–0 win away to Watford. On 10 April 2022, his 30th birthday, Mané scored Liverpool's equalising goal in a 2–2 away draw against Manchester City. Mané then followed this with two goals against the same opposition on 16 April at Wembley Stadium in a FA Cup semi-final, in a 3–2 win to help Liverpool reach their first FA Cup final since 2012, which they eventually won. On 3 May, he scored the winning goal in a 3–2 away victory over Villarreal in the Champions League semi-final, to secure his team's place in the final, which Liverpool eventually lost 1–0 to Real Madrid. Liverpool narrowly missed out on the chance to achieve a historic quadruple, coming second in the Premier League and the 2021–22 UEFA Champions League but winning both the EFL Cup and the FA Cup.

=== Bayern Munich ===
On 22 June 2022, Mané joined Bundesliga club Bayern Munich on a contract with the German side until 30 June 2025. The fee was reported to be €32 million (£27.4m) potentially rising to €41 million (£35m) based on appearances plus individual and team achievements. On 30 July 2022, Mané made his official debut, starting in the 2022 DFL-Supercup and scored his debut goal to help Bayern to 5–3 victory over RB Leipzig at the Red Bull Arena. He followed this up a week later with his first Bundesliga goal in a 6–1 victory over Eintracht Frankfurt.

On 8 November, Mané suffered an injury and had to go off after 20 minutes of Bayern's 6–1 victory against Werder Bremen. This injury prevented him from competing in the 2022 FIFA World Cup and he had to undergo surgery in his right fibula. He stayed out for three months and made his return on 26 February 2023 as a substitute, coming on in the 65th minute for Kingsley Coman in Bayern's 3–0 win against Union Berlin.

On 13 April, Mané was suspended and fined by Bayern, following reports he punched teammate Leroy Sané in the dressing room after a 3–0 Champions League quarter-final loss to Manchester City. On 28 May, Bayern Munich won the Bundesliga following the concession of two points by league leaders Borussia Dortmund.

=== Al-Nassr ===
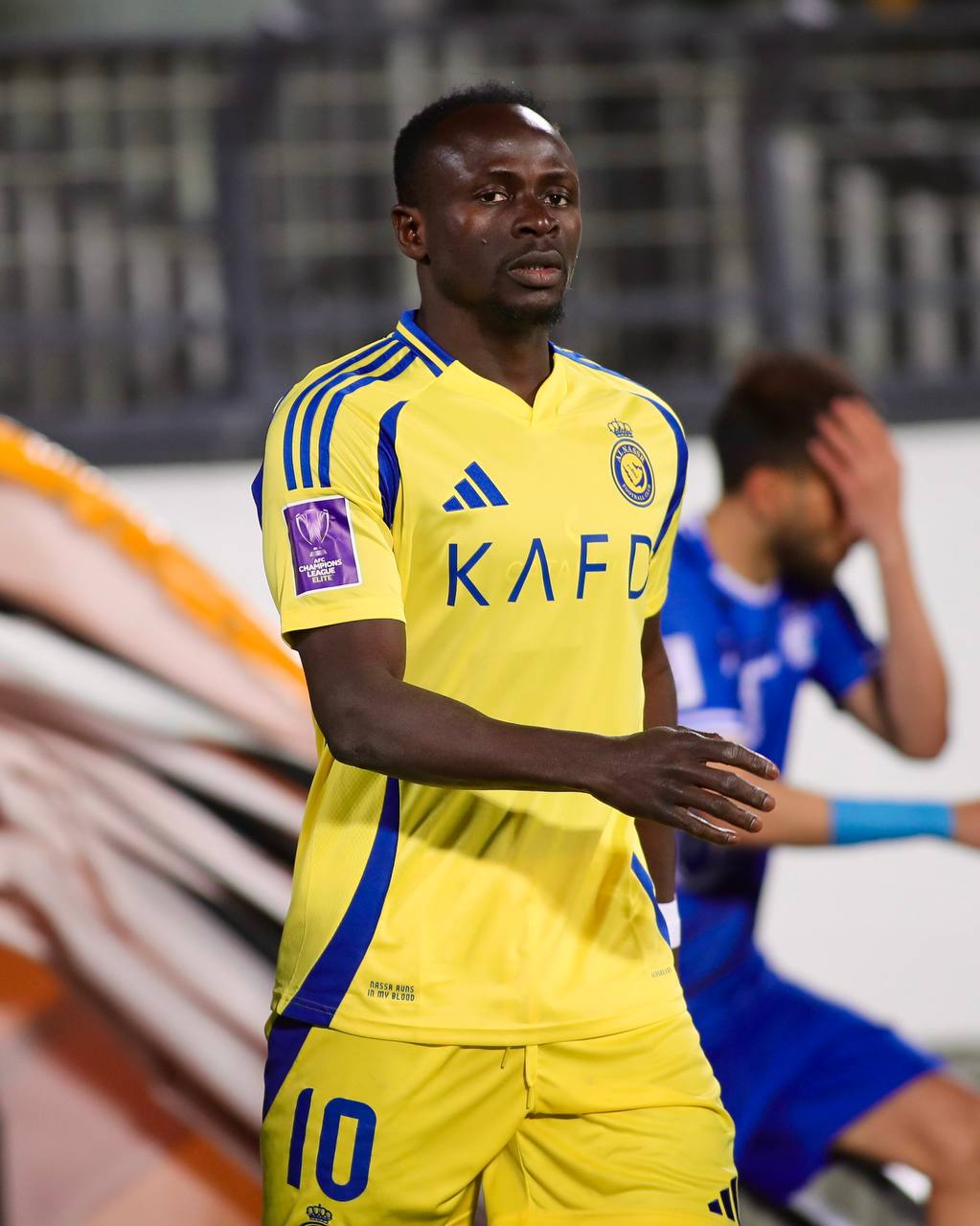
Mané with Al Nassr in 2025

On 1 August 2023, Saudi Pro League club Al Nassr announced the signing of Mané. Mané later revealed that former Liverpool teammates Fabinho and Roberto Firmino had previously contacted him in order to recommend to him that he might join their clubs, Al-Ittihad and Al-Ahli in Saudi Arabia respectively. Mané also stated that his former captain Jordan Henderson had sent him a good luck message upon his departure to Saudi Arabia. Two days later, he made his debut replacing Abdulaziz Al-Aliwa at halftime in their 1–1 draw with Zamalek in the 2023 Arab Club Champions Cup. The competition was won by his club after a 2–1 victory after extra time over Al Hilal in the final on 12 August. He scored his first goal for the club on 14 August in a 2–1 loss against Al-Ettifaq in the league.

He scored 10 goals and provided 6 assists as his club secured the 2025–26 Saudi Pro League title.

== International career ==
=== 2012–2017 ===
Mané was part of the Senegal team at the 2012 Olympic tournament, and started every match as they advanced through Group A as runners-up to Great Britain before losing 4–2 after extra time in the quarter-finals to eventual champions Mexico.

Mané was ruled out of the Senegalese squad for the 2015 Africa Cup of Nations after suffering a calf injury in Southampton's 2–0 win against Arsenal on 1 January 2015. He later returned to the squad, and started in their final two group matches against South Africa and Algeria in a group stage exit.

=== 2017–2019 ===
Mané represented Senegal at the 2017 Africa Cup of Nations in Gabon and scored a goal in each of the nation's opening two games, 2–0 wins against Tunisia and Zimbabwe. After a goalless draw in the quarter-final clash against Cameroon, he missed the penalty in the shoot-out that saw Senegal eliminated from the tournament.

In May 2018, Mané was named in Senegal's 23-man squad for the 2018 FIFA World Cup in Russia. He scored the opening goal in a 2–2 draw against Japan in the group stage. Mané started all three of Senegal's group matches as they were eliminated after the first stage, finishing below Japan on fair play points.

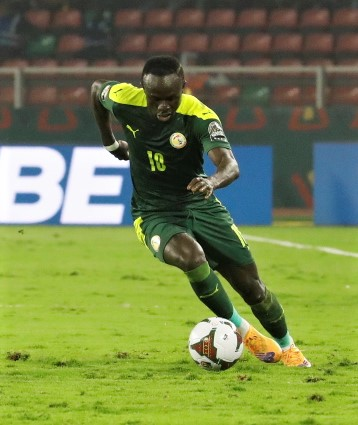
Mané in action for Senegal at the 2021 Africa Cup of Nations

Mané was once again called up to Senegal's final squad for the 2019 Africa Cup of Nations. He scored two goals and missed a penalty in a 3–0 win against Kenya, as Senegal finished second in the group stage and qualified for the knockout stage. Mané scored the only goal of the match and missed another penalty in Senegal's 1–0 win over Uganda in the round of 16. He played in Senegal's next three matches as they advanced to the final, losing 1–0 to Algeria in a rematch of Senegal's opening game of the tournament. Despite finishing the competition as runner-up, Mané was named in the Team of the Tournament.

=== 2021–2026 ===
At the 2021 Africa Cup of Nations, Mané starred for Senegal as they won the competition for the first time. In the final against Egypt – a match which saw him go up against his Liverpool teammate Mohamed Salah – Mané saw his penalty saved in the seventh minute, but went on to score the winning kick in the penalty shoot-out. As well as scoring the decisive kick to win the trophy, Mané scored three goals and had two assists prior to the final, and was named the Player of the Tournament. In the third round of the 2022 World Cup qualifications, he also scored the winning kick in the penalty shoot-out against Egypt after a 1–1 draw on aggregate, in order to qualify his country to the 2022 FIFA World Cup.

On 4 June 2022, Mané scored a hat-trick in a 3–1 win against Benin during 2023 Africa Cup of Nations qualification, surpassing Henri Camara to become Senegal's all-time top scorer with 31 goals.

On 11 November 2022, Mané was included in Senegal's 26-man squad for the 2022 FIFA World Cup in Qatar, despite an injury he picked up during Bayern Munich's 6–1 win over Werder Bremen a few days prior. However, on 17 November, Mané was ruled out of the tournament and withdrew from the squad.

Mané made his 100th appearance for Senegal on 18 November 2023, scoring twice in a 2026 FIFA World Cup qualifier against South Sudan.

In December 2023, Mané was named in Senegal's squad for the postponed 2023 Africa Cup of Nations held in the Ivory Coast. He ended the group stage with one goal against Cameroon and assists against the Gambia and Guinea. He then played the full 120 minutes against the Ivory Coast in the round of 16, assisting Habib Diallo for Senegal's goal. After the match finished in a 1–1 draw after extra time, Senegal were knocked out by the hosts and eventual winners in the penalty shoot-out.

On 14 October 2025, Mané netted twice in a 4–0 win against Mauritania, leading Senegal to qualify for the 2026 FIFA World Cup. Later that year, he was called up for the 2025 Africa Cup of Nations.

On 14 January 2026, Mané's goal sealed a 1–0 semi-final win against Egypt in the Africa Cup of Nations. On 18 January, Senegal eventually managed to defeat host nation Morocco 1–0 after extra time in the final, with Mané lifting the trophy as captain of his nation and earning the tournament's best player award for a second time. However, Morocco were awarded the title nearly two months later, after Senegal was deemed to have forfeited the match by choosing to leave the pitch in protest of a penalty awarded to the hosts prior to extra time.

On 21 May 2026, Mané was selected by Senegal coach Pape Thiaw in the 26-man squad for the 2026 World Cup. In Senegal's second group match on 22 June, he set up Ismaïla Sarr's first goal in an eventual 3–2 defeat to Norway. Senegal were eliminated in the round of 32 following a 3–2 defeat to Belgium on 1 July.

Despite several reports claiming that Mané had announced his international retirement following the conclusion of the tournament, new Senegal head coach Patrick Vieira confirmed in September 2026 that Mané would only be absent from his first squad due to a physical issue, and that he should be returning to the national team for the next window. However, Mané would then miss the November 2026 international window due to the expected birth of his child, with Vieira confirming he had been granted a leave of absence from the team.

== Player profile ==
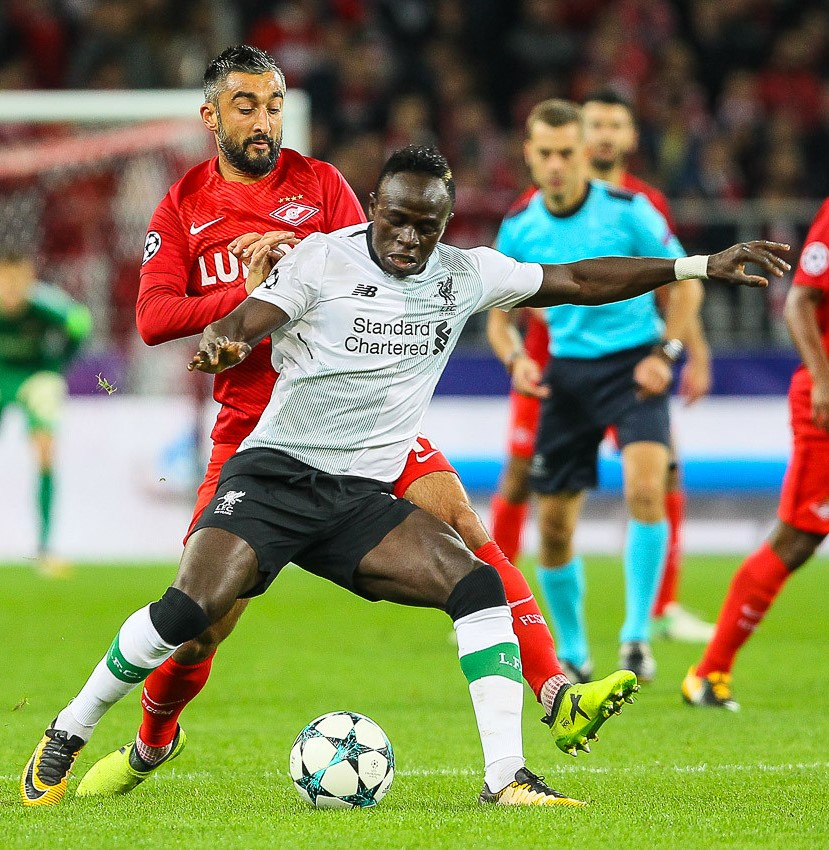
Mané in action for Liverpool during the 2017–18 Champions League campaign.

Mané was described as a complete player who plays with "high levels of intensity and concentration" by former Liverpool teammate Fabinho. Former Liverpool defender Jamie Carragher called Mané a "world-class winger", comparing him to the likes of former Liverpool player John Barnes. He was also compared to Cristiano Ronaldo by former Ajax defender Danny Blind, who praised him for his ability to score with either foot and headers, along with making "astonishing" sprints.

A versatile forward, Mané is a prolific goalscorer, whose main traits are his finishing, speed, technique, and trickery in possession, as well as his decision-making, tactical awareness, creativity, agility, balance, control, touch on the ball, and dribbling skills. He has also drawn praise in the media for his intelligent play, passing, and his ability to get into good positions, from which he can score goals or create chances for teammates. Known for his quiet and timid personality, his ability to cope with pressure has also been highlighted as one of his main strengths. Beyond his offensive, technical, and creative qualities, his high defensive work-rate has also been noted by pundits, as well as his ability in the air, despite his modest stature of 1.75 m (5 ft 9 in). Mané usually plays as a winger on the left flank, a position which allows him to cut into the centre and shoot on goal with his stronger, right foot. During the 2021–22 season, with the signing of Luis Díaz, Mané began playing more as a central striker and flourished in that role. In 2022, Mané was cited by Kyle Walker as one of the toughest opponents he has ever faced in his career.

== Community and philanthropy ==
In 2019, Mané donated £250,000 ($319,103; €284,813) to build a school in his home town of Bambali, Senegal. In March 2020, Mané donated £41,000 ($52,564; €46,083) to the national committee fighting COVID-19 in Senegal. In 2021, he donated £500,000 ($684,932; €561,987) towards the construction of a hospital in Bambali. In addition, he has also financed the building of a petrol station and a post office for his local community, supplying the school with free laptops and internet from the 4G internet service he financed in the village. In total, he has spent more than £700,000 ($958,904; €786,782) on these upgrades. In addition, he commissioned a €70-a-month stipend to each family in his 2,000-person hometown. This is roughly equivalent to a month's wage for a Senegalese citizen on a minimum wage.

Mané is also an ambassador for Right To Play, an international non-profit organization with a mission to empower vulnerable children. He has collaborated with the non-profit to provide equality and empowerment to young girls and women in Senegal, raising "awareness of the importance for both girls and boys to be able to access sport and education opportunities".

== Personal life ==
Whilst at Liverpool, Mané resided in Allerton, Liverpool, and has been burgled twice, once in November 2017 and again in February 2019. He is a practising Muslim and occasionally is seen making du'a before the start of each match.

He was appointed a Grand Officer of the National Order of the Lion by President of Senegal Macky Sall following the nation's victory at the 2021 Africa Cup of Nations.

He married Aisha Tamba, who is 13 years younger than him, on 7 January 2024 through an Islamic rite. At the time of their marriage, he was 31 and she was 18 years old. They had reportedly met more than two years before.

== Career statistics ==
=== Club ===
As of match played 29 October 2026

Appearances and goals by club, season and competition
Club	Season	League			National cup (Note: Includes Coupe de France, Austrian Cup, FA Cup, DFB-Pokal, King's Cup)		League cup (Note: Includes Coupe de la Ligue, EFL Cup)		Continental		Other		Total	
Club	Season	Division	Apps	Goals	Apps	Goals	Apps	Goals	Apps	Goals	Apps	Goals	Apps	Goals
Metz B	2011–12	CFA	12	2	0	0	0	0	—		—		12	2
Metz	2011–12	Ligue 2	19	1	0	0	0	0	—		—		19	1
Metz	2012–13	Championnat National	3	1	0	0	1	0	—		—		4	1
Metz	Total		22	2	0	0	1	0	—		—		23	2
Red Bull Salzburg	2012–13	Austrian Bundesliga	26	16	3	3	—		—		—		29	19
Red Bull Salzburg	2013–14	Austrian Bundesliga	33	13	4	5	—		13 (Note: Two appearances in UEFA Champions League, eleven appearances and five goals in UEFA Europa League)	5	—		50	23
Red Bull Salzburg	2014–15	Austrian Bundesliga	4	2	1	1	—		3 (Note: Appearances in UEFA Champions League)	0	—		8	3
Red Bull Salzburg	Total		63	31	8	9	—		16	5	—		87	45
Southampton	2014–15	Premier League	30	10	0	0	2	0	—		—		32	10
Southampton	2015–16	Premier League	37	11	1	0	2	3	3 (Note: Appearances in UEFA Europa League)	1	—		43	15
Southampton	Total		67	21	1	0	4	3	3	1	—		75	25
Liverpool	2016–17	Premier League	27	13	0	0	2	0	—		—		29	13
Liverpool	2017–18	Premier League	29	10	2	0	0	0	13	10	—		44	20
Liverpool	2018–19	Premier League	36	22	0	0	1	0	13	4	—		50	26
Liverpool	2019–20	Premier League	35	18	1	0	0	0	8	2	3 (Note: One appearance and two goals in UEFA Super Cup, two appearances in FIFA Club World Cup)	2	47	22
Liverpool	2020–21	Premier League	35	11	2	2	0	0	10	3	1 (Note: Appearance in FA Community Shield)	0	48	16
Liverpool	2021–22	Premier League	34	16	3	2	1	0	13	5	—		51	23
Liverpool	Total		196	90	8	4	4	0	57	24	4	2	269	120
Bayern Munich	2022–23	Bundesliga	25	7	3	1	—		9	3	1 (Note: Appearance in DFL-Supercup)	1	38	12
Al Nassr	2023–24	Saudi Pro League	32	13	5	4	—		8 (Note: Appearances in AFC Champions League)	1	5 (Note: Four appearances in Arab Club Champions Cup, one appearance and one goal in Saudi Super Cup)	1	50	19
Al Nassr	2024–25	Saudi Pro League	32	14	2	1	—		11	3	2 (Note: Appearance(s) in Saudi Super Cup)	0	47	18
Al Nassr	2025–26	Saudi Pro League	25	10	2	0	—		8 (Note: Appearances in AFC Champions League Two)	3	1	1	36	14
Al Nassr	2026–27	Saudi Pro League	11	3	1	0	—		2	0	0	0	14	3
Al Nassr	Total		100	40	10	5	—		29	7	8	2	147	54
Career total			485	193	30	19	9	3	114	40	13	5	651	260

=== International ===
As of match played 1 July 2026

Appearances and goals by national team and year
National team	Year	Apps	Goals
Senegal	2012	6	2
Senegal	2013	8	1
Senegal	2014	9	3
Senegal	2015	9	3
Senegal	2016	7	1
Senegal	2017	10	4
Senegal	2018	9	1
Senegal	2019	11	4
Senegal	2020	2	2
Senegal	2021	9	5
Senegal	2022	13	8
Senegal	2023	8	6
Senegal	2024	12	6
Senegal	2025	11	7
Senegal	2026	10	3
Total		134	56

== Honours ==
Red Bull Salzburg

- Austrian Bundesliga: 2013–14
- Austrian Cup: 2013–14

Liverpool

- Premier League: 2019–20
- FA Cup: 2021–22
- EFL Cup: 2021–22
- UEFA Champions League: 2018–19; runner-up: 2017–18, 2021–22
- UEFA Super Cup: 2019
- FIFA Club World Cup: 2019

Bayern Munich

- Bundesliga: 2022–23
- DFL-Supercup: 2022

Al-Nassr

- Saudi Pro League: 2025–26
- Arab Club Champions Cup: 2023
- King's Cup runner-up: 2023–24
- AFC Champions League Two runner-up: 2025–26

Senegal

- Africa Cup of Nations: 2021; runner-up: 2019, 2025

Individual

- Sócrates Award: 2022
- CAF Team of the Year: 2015, 2016, 2018, 2019, 2023
- PFA Team of the Year: 2016–17 Premier League, 2018–19 Premier League, 2019–20 Premier League, 2021–22 Premier League
- PFA Fans' Player of the Month: August & September 2016, August 2018, March 2019
- Premier League Player of the Month: August 2017, March 2019, November 2019
- Liverpool Fans' Player of the Season Award: 2016–17
- Liverpool Players' Player of the Season Award: 2016–17
- Premier League Golden Boot: 2018–19 (shared)
- King's Cup top scorer: 2023–24 (joint)
- UEFA Champions League Squad of the Season: 2018–19
- UEFA Team of the Year: 2019
- Africa Cup of Nations Player of the Tournament: 2021, 2025
- Africa Cup of Nations Team of the Tournament: 2019, 2021, 2025
- African Footballer of the Year: 2019, 2022
- Onze d'Or: 2018–19
- IFFHS Men's World Team: 2019
- ESM Team of the Year: 2018–19
- PFA Fans' Player of the Year: 2019–20 Premier League
- IFFHS CAF Men Team of The Year: 2020, 2021, 2022
- IFFHS CAF Men's Team of the Decade 2011–2020
- IFFHS Best CAF Men's Player of the Year: 2020, 2022

Orders

- Grand Officer of the National Order of the Lion: 2022

== See also ==
- List of Liverpool F.C. records and statistics
- Premier League records and statistics
- List of men's footballers with 100 or more international caps
- List of men's footballers with 50 or more international goals
