= Aida Mbodj =

Senegalese politician

Aïda Mbodj
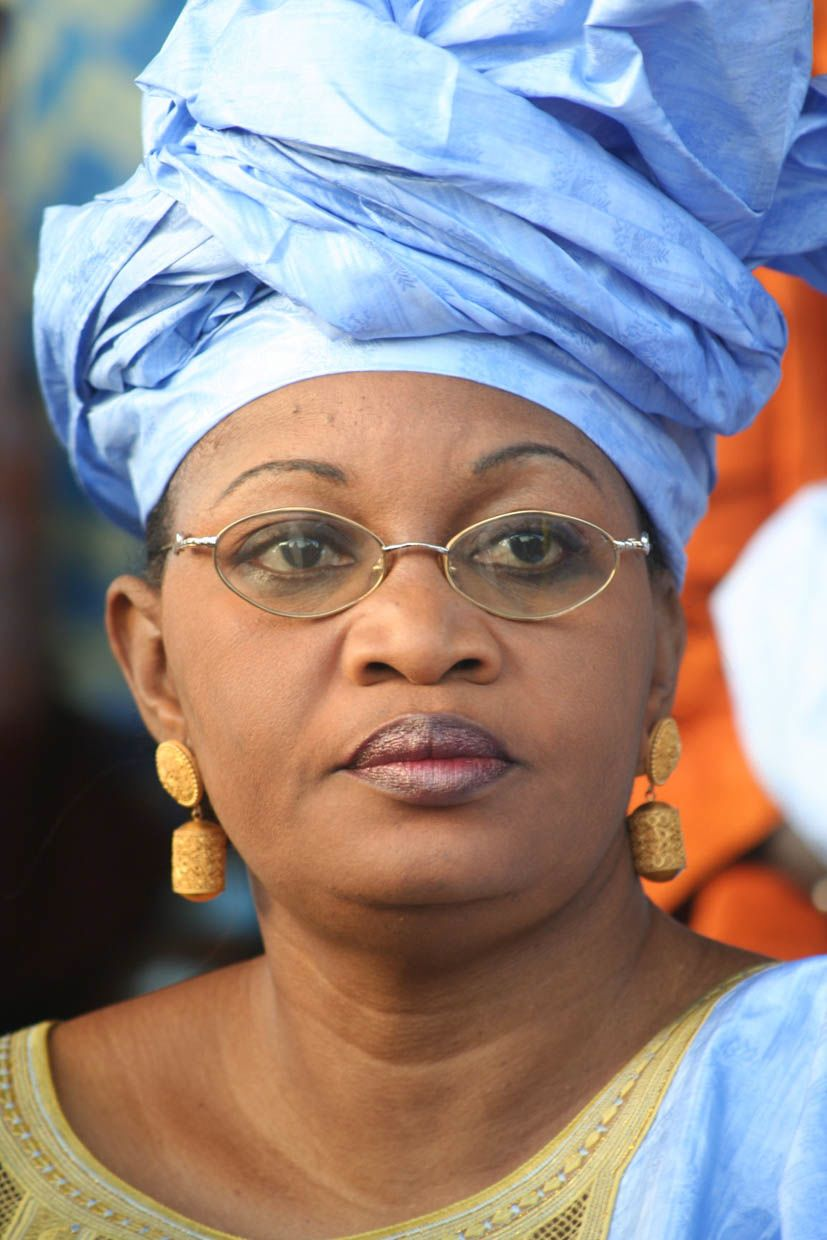
- Aïda Mbodj in 2006

Minister of State, the Family and Women's Organizations, Vice-President of the National Assembly of Senegal
- Incumbent
- Assumed office May 2011
- Succeeded by: Awa Ndiaye
- Incumbent
- Assumed office April 21, 2004 to June 19, 2007

Personal details
- Born: April 1955 (age 71) Bambey, Senegal
- Party: Parti Démocratique Sénégalais
- Occupation: Deputy

Aïda Mbodj is a Senegalese politician, a Deputy and a Cabinet Minister, as well as Vice-President of the National Assembly of Senegal.

== Biography ==
During the first government of Macky Sall (from April 21, 2014 to November 23, 2016), she was Minister of Women, the Family and Social Development. She also held a cabinet post during the second government of Macky Sall (from November 23, 2016 to June 19, 2017), this time with a larger cabinet portfolio, as Minister of Women, the Family, Social Development and Women's Entrepreneurship.

To the disappointment of her supporters, she was not kept on in the government of Cheikh Hadjibou Soumaré who named Awa Ndiaye to the post in June 2007.

Mbodj made her political comeback in 2011, recently being named to the cabinet of current President Abdoulaye Wade's government as Minister of State, the Family and Women's Organizations. She was a supporter of efforts by Abdoulaye Wade to amend the Constitution to enable to continue in office for another term. Large protests organized by both supporters and opponents of Wade took place during the Summer of 2011.

== See also ==
=== Articles ===
- Senegal
- Women in Senegal
