= Festival des cinémas d'Afrique du pays d'Apt =

Annual film festival

- Location: Apt, Vaucluse, France
- Founded: 2003
- Founded by: Fanny Toulemonde (Projections), Cinéma César, Le Goût de lire en pays d’Apt, Dominique Wallon and the Comité de jumelage Apt-Bakel, Senegal
- Festival date: November annually
- Language: French; English
- Website: https://www.africapt-festival.fr/

The Festival des cinémas d'Afrique du pays d'Apt (FCAPA) is an annual international film festival on African cinema organised since 2003 in Apt, Vaucluse, France.

Programs of recent festival editions screen films in the categories of fiction feature films, long documentaries, shorts, and a press conference feature film. The festival has also presented film retrospectives of many African filmmakers, including Merzak Allouache, Malek Bensmaïl, Souleymane Cissé, Mahamat Saleh Haroun, Samba Félix Ndiaye, Idrissa Ouedraogo, Ousmane Sembène, Abderrahmane Sissako, and Tariq Teguia.

== 2023 programme ==
The 2023 edition of the FCAPA screened 7 short and 20 feature films, including Amchilini (Choisis-moi) (documentary, 2023) by Kader Allamine (Tchad); Behind the Mountains (fiction, 2023) by Mohamed Ben Attia (Tunisia); Our lady of the Chinese Shop (fiction, 2022) by Ery Claver (Angola); Au cimetière de la pellicule (documentary, 2023) by Thierno Souleymane Diallo (Guinea); La mère de tous les mensonges (documentary, 2023) by Asmae El Moudir (Morocco); Goodbye Julia (fiction, 2023) by Mohamed Kordofani (Sudan); Nome (fiction, 2023) by Sana Na N’Hada (Guinea-Bissau); Eat bitter (documentary, 2023) by Ningyi Sun (China) and Pascale Appora-Gnekindy (Central African Republic); and Banel et Adama (fiction, 2023) by Ramata-Toulaye Sy (France/Senegal).

== Productions and outreach ==
The Festival produced several films with support of the Centre national du cinéma et de l'image animée, including Nanga Def and Nawaari, both by Moussa Touré in 2005 with the participation of local students, and Regards de femmes (2005) by Michel Amarger, Électro for ever (2008) by Angèle Diabang Brener with electronics students, and Le regard colonial, a 2010 montage by Jean-Pierre Daniel of colonial films.

Engaging pupils of local schools was a festival goal since the start. A screenwriter-in-residence - Nina Khada in 2022 and Lamine Ammarkhodja in 2023 - guided local students in the FCAPA Junior workshop for eight weeks to write and produce a video.

In each year's Marathon program an invited film director coaches various teams to each create a three-minute short in 48 hours, which is then shown and judged by a jury at the Festival.

== Gallery of participants ==
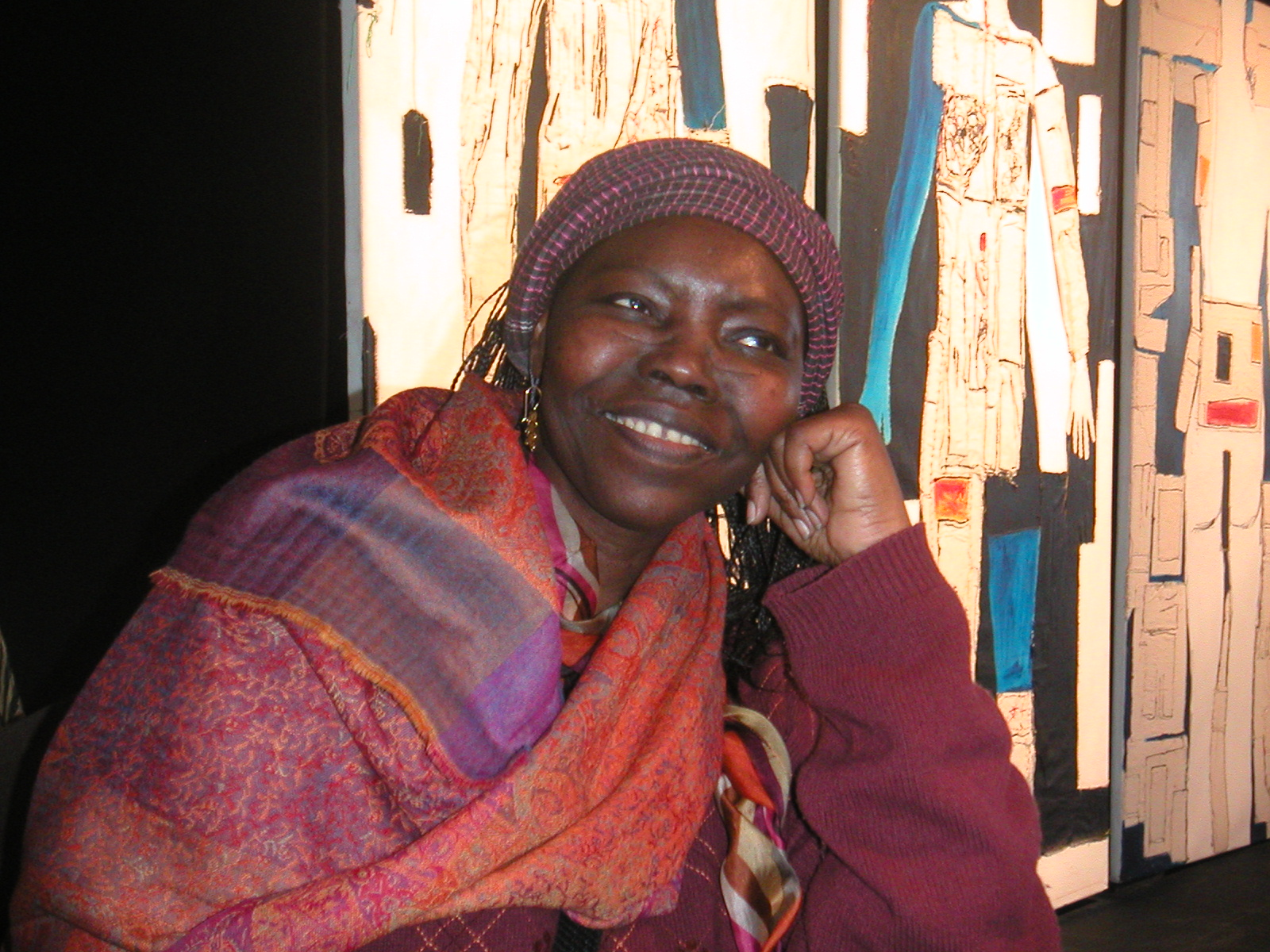
Safi Faye, 2004.

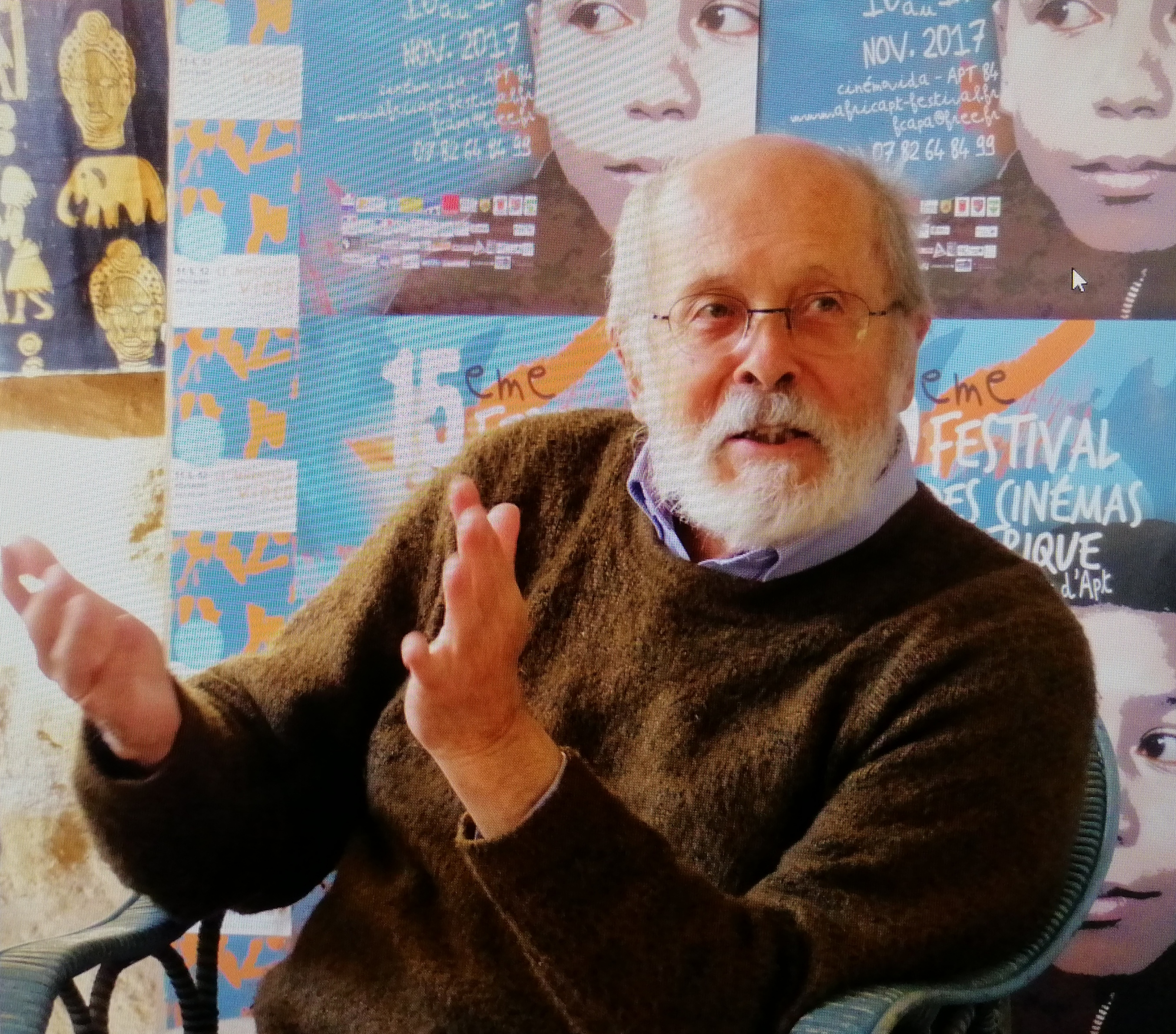
Dominique Wallon, 2017.

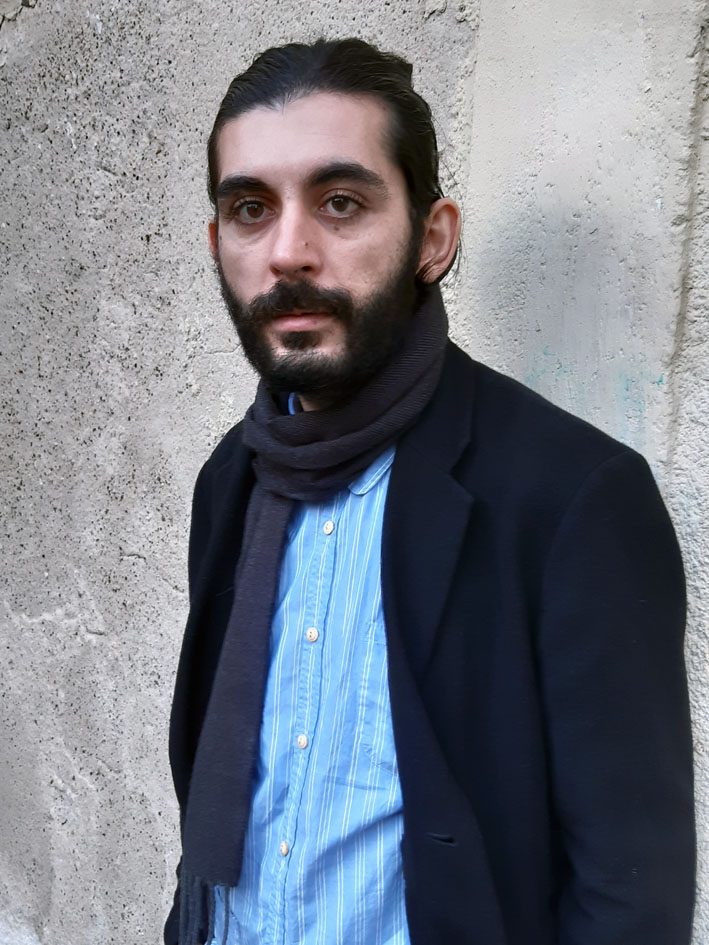
Mouloud Aït Liotna, 2023.

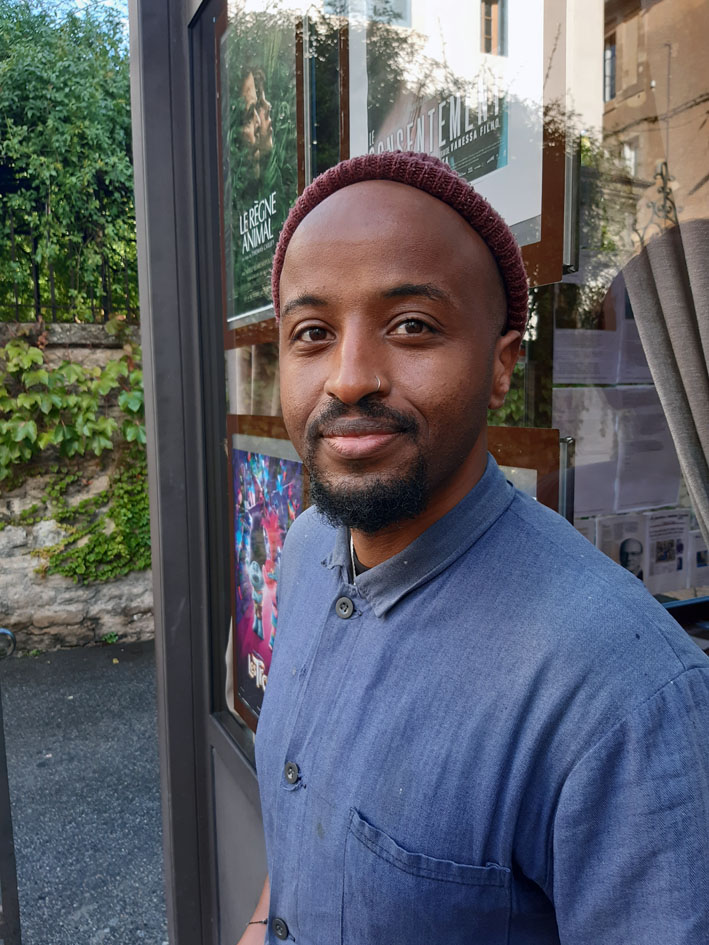
Beru Tessema, 2023.

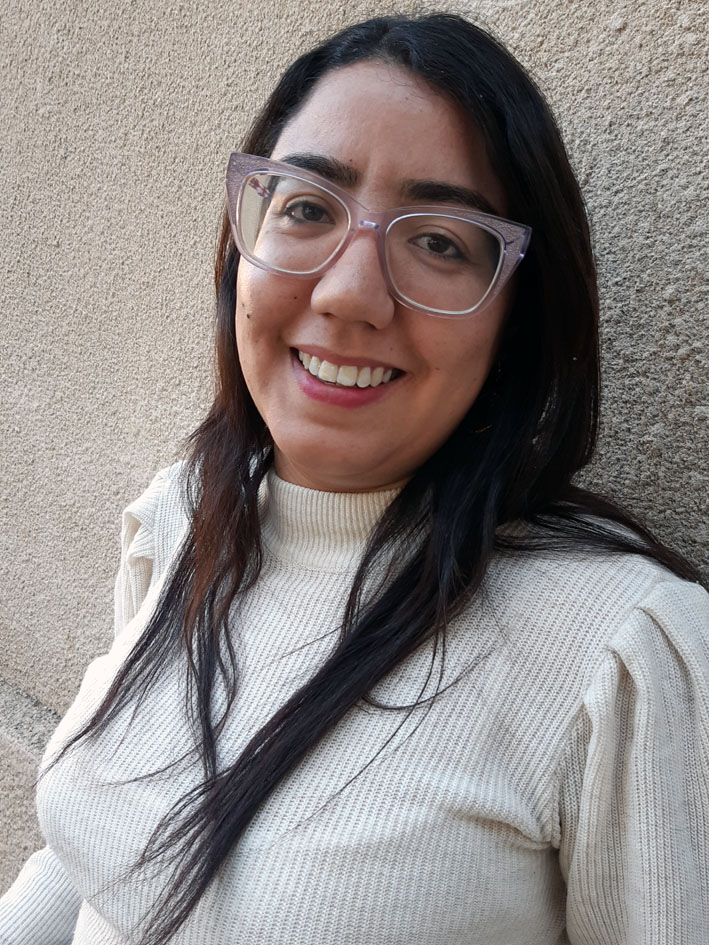
Marwa Tiba, 2023.

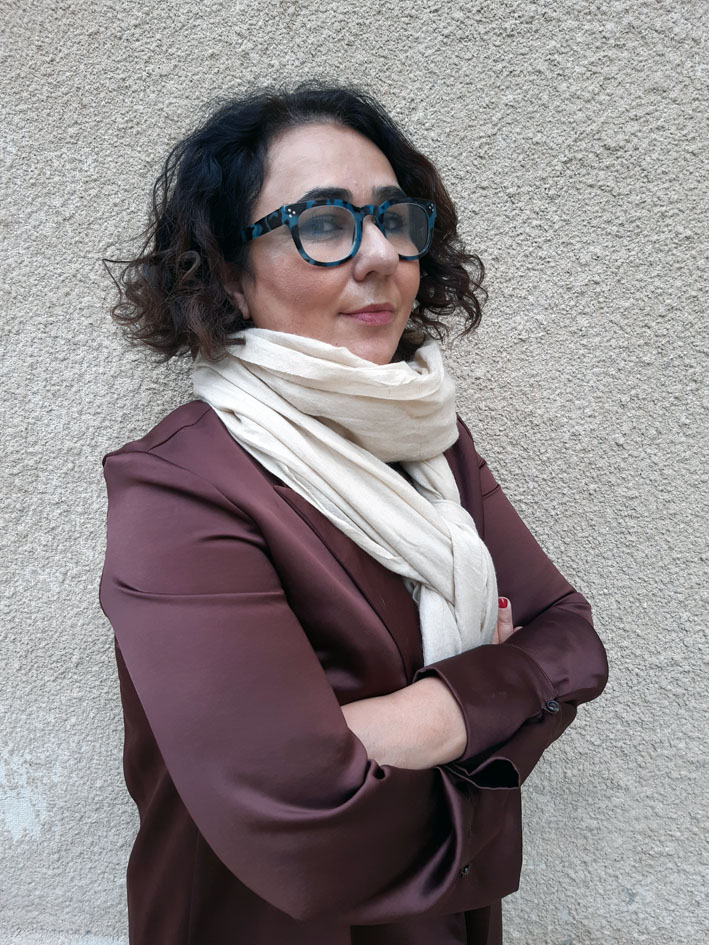
Leïla Kilani, 2023.

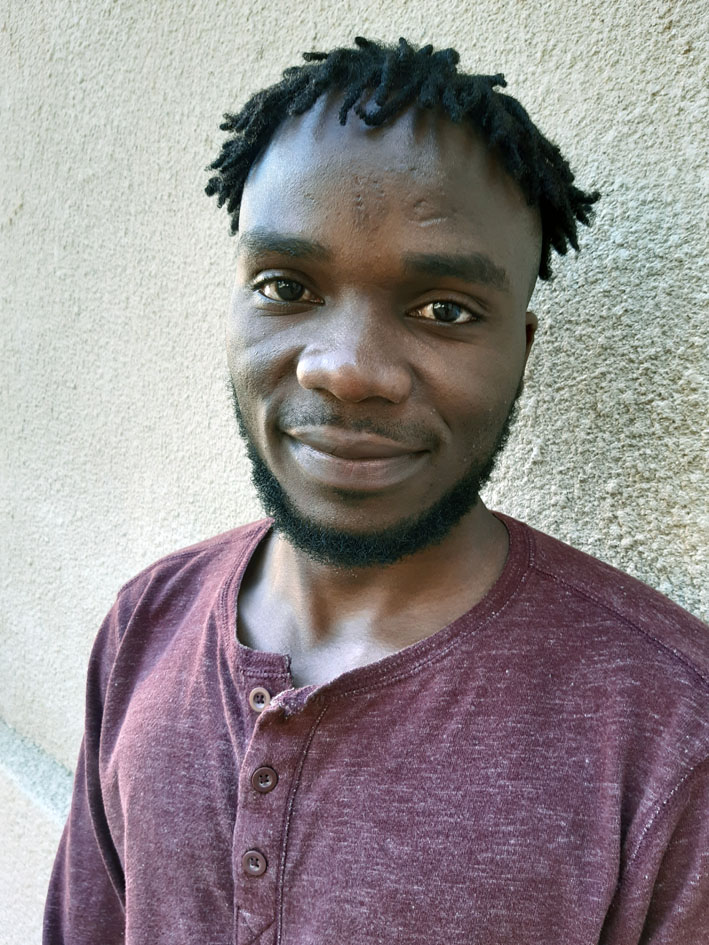
Maisha Maene, 2023.

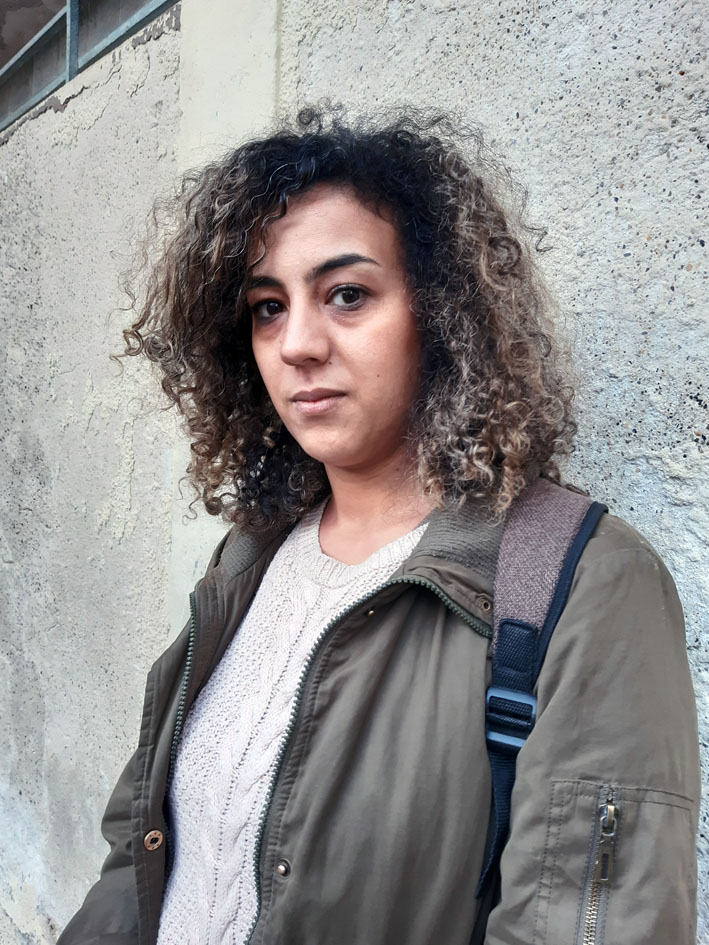
Rim Mejdi, 2023.

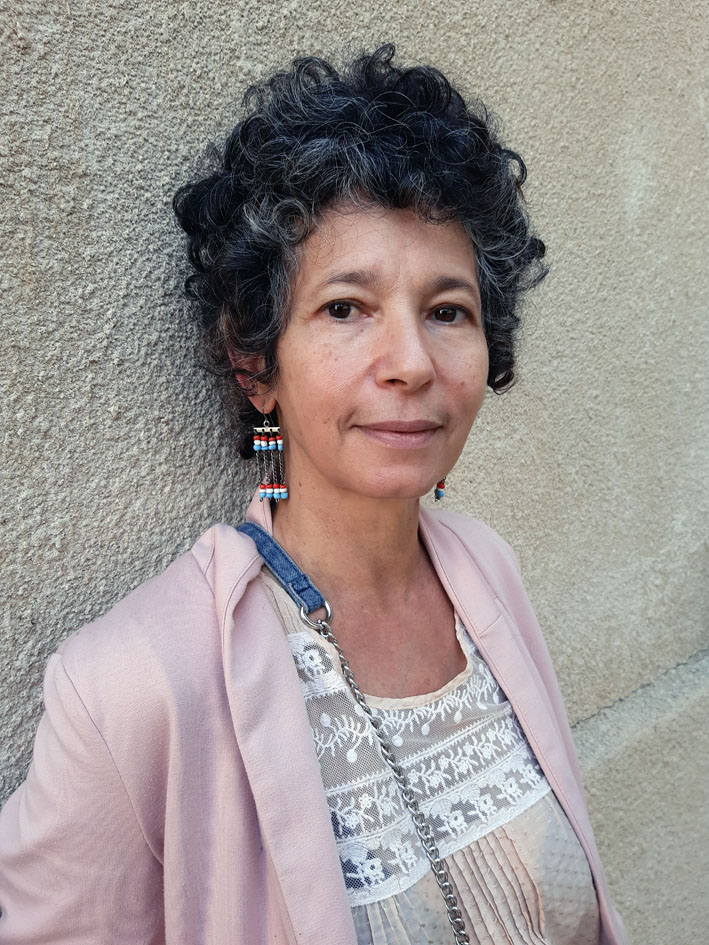
Nadia Raïs, 2023.

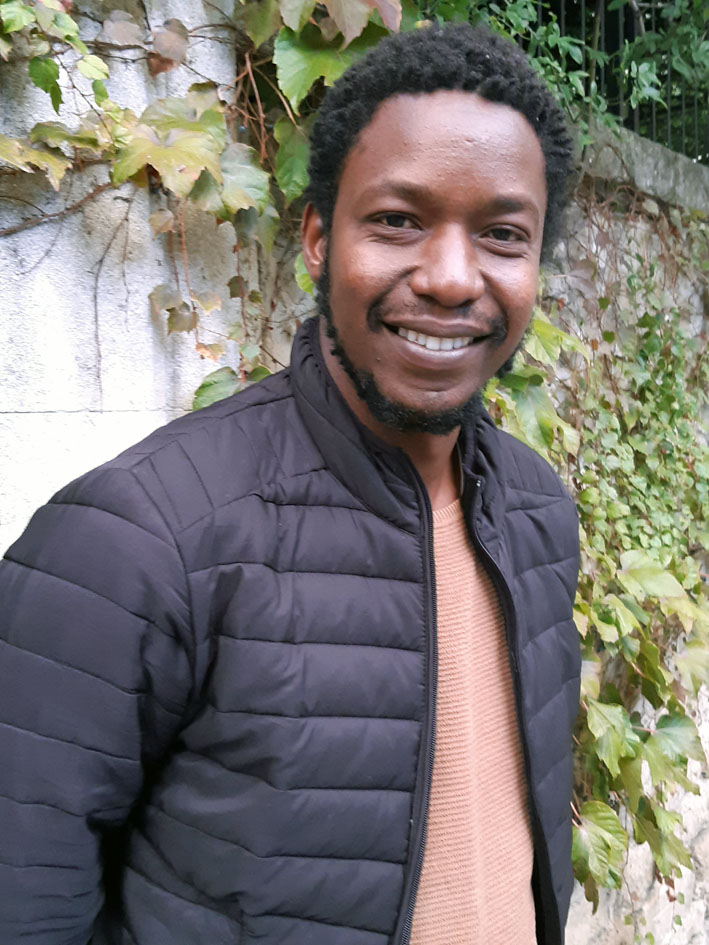
Thierno Souleymane Diallo, 2023.
