= Angèle Diabang Brener =

Senegalese screenwriter, director and film producer

- Born: 1979 (age 46–47); Dakar, Senegal
- Education: Média Centre de Dakar, La Fémis in Paris, Filmakademie Baden-Württemberg in Germany
- Occupations: Screenwriter, director and film producer
- Years active: 2005-present

Angèle Diabang Brener is a Senegalese screenwriter, director and film producer.

== Early life and education ==
Angèle Diabang Brener was born in Dakar in 1979. Her training and education in film making took place in Dakar at the Média Centre de Dakar, subsequently at the French state film school La Fémis in Paris, and then at the renowned Filmakademie Baden-Württemberg in Germany.

== Career ==
She began her career as a film editor then in 2005 she directed her first film, a documentary on the beauty standards for Senegalese women entitled "Mon beau sourire". She runs the production company Karoninka which is credited with over a dozen films.

== Filmography ==
- 2005 : Mon beau sourire
- 2007 : L’Homme est le remède de l’homme, with Ousseynou Ndiaye and El Hadji Mamadou "Leuz" Niang
- 2007 : Le Revers de l'exil
- 2007 : Sénégalaises et Islam
- 2008 : Yandé Codou, la griotte de Senghor
- 2014 : Congo, un médecin pour sauver les femmes A documentary on the work of Dr Denis Mukwege.

== Awards ==
- For Sénégalaises et Islam

- 2007 - Jury Prize at Festival Images citoyennes (Liège, Belgium)
- 2007 - Mention spéciale (Jury distinction) at the Festival des Cinémas d'Afrique du pays d'Apt (Apt Festival of African Films, Apt, France)

== See also ==
- Cinema of Senegal
- List of Senegalese films
- Women in Senegal
