= Safiatou Thiam =

Dr. Safiatou Thiam
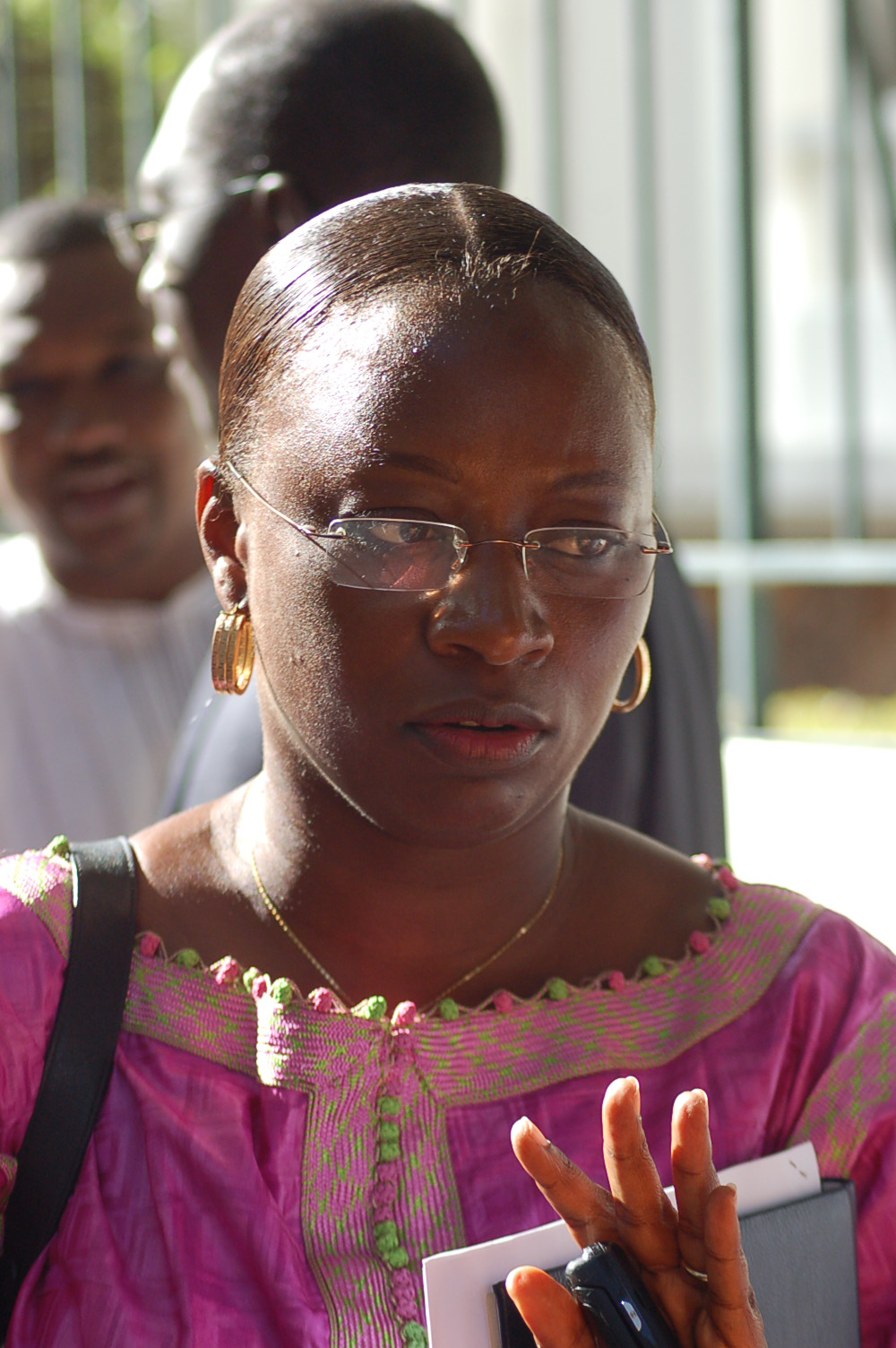
- Dr. Safiatou Thiam (centre)

Minister for Health and Disease Prevention
- In office 13 September 2007 – April 2009
- Preceded by: Abdou Fall
- Succeeded by: Thérèse Coumba Diop

Personal details
- Education: Université Cheikh Anta Diop (Dakar), Université Pierre et Marie Curie (Paris VI)
- Occupation: Medical doctor

Safiatou Thiam is a Senegalese public health doctor, a specialist in HIV/AIDS and former Minister of Health and Disease Prevention in the government of Cheikh Hadjibou Soumaré.She later became Executive Secretary of CNLS National Council against AIDS

== Early life ==
She earned her doctorate degree in Public Health 1995 at Université Cheikh Anta Diop in Dakar, with a thesis titled Le SIDA en milieu chirurgical : Connaissances, attitudes et pratiques (in English: AIDS in the surgical arena: Knowledge, attitudes and practises). She completed a Master of Science degree at the Institute of Tropical Medicine in Antwerp in 1997. She completed many specialist diplomas in Dakar and in France, as well as a DEA in Santé publique et pays en développement (English: Public Health and Developing Countries) at l'Université Pierre et Marie Curie (Paris VI) in 2001.

At the Conseil national de la lutte contre le Sida (CNLS) (in English: National Council for the Fight Against AIDS), she directs the programs of the Fonds mondial de lutte contre cette pandémie. In 2007 she was recruited as the coordinator of the Joint United Nations Programme on HIV/AIDS program in Senegal. In 2014 she served as a consultant at GMS/OASYS Grant Management Solutions. Mali. Institute of Health and Development.

At Paris VI University she earned a Diploma of Thorough (DEA) in " Public Health and Developing Countries " (2001). At University Cheikh Anta Diop of Dakar she garnered a Certificate of Specialized Studies (CES) in Infectious and Tropical Diseases (2001). At the Institute of Tropical Medicine Antwerp in Belgium she picked up a Master of Science: Degree in Tropical Biomedical Sciences (epidemiology and disease control option) (1997). At the Paul Correa Institute of Dakar Diploma she completed a Course on Planning and Organization of control of STDs and AIDS in developing countries (1998). At the Fournier Institute Paris International she completed a Diploma Course on Sexually Transmitted Diseases (STDs). At the AIDS Institute Fournier in Paris (1998), University Cheikh Anta Diop of Dakar State she earned her Doctorate Medicine ( 1995).

== Career ==
In 1998 in Senegal she for UNHCR / OFADEC she was a Consultant Physician for refugee Assistance.

From August 1999 - December 2001 she worked in IMEA Physician Clinical Coordination and monitoring test cohort 1st clinical trials of antiretrovirals.

From January to December 1997 in Senegal she was a NACP research Assistant Coordinator on intervention strategies among female sex workers in Dakar. supervisions activities support and STI prevention in health districts and centers support TS (IST center ) Training of trainers on the use of guides syndromic management of STIs in the place of doctors, nurses and midwives,

From 1995 to 1996 she worked at the Senegal Ministry of Health as an epidemiological investigator on: diagnostic capability of STD health centers a preliminary investigation of a proposed program to fight diabetes, malaria morbidity and mortality.

From January 2002 to September 2003 Senegal DLSI / Ministry of Health Head Office Support HIV planning, support for implementation, supervision of activities Coordination of the National Steering Committee of Voluntary Counselling and Testing Coordination Committee drafting standards and Guidelines Centres Coordination Councils and Voluntary Testing the definition and implementation work of the decentralization policy initiative Senegalese antiretroviral access in areas Member of the editorial boards of documents on standards supported with antiretrovirals at health posts, health centers and hospitals member group a number of technical documents : the National Policy on injection Safety in Senegal Senegal 's proposals to the Global Fund to Fight against AIDS, tuberculosis and Malaria; Guides syndromic management of STIs; Guides counseling and support for HIV strategic Plan 2002-2006 contrele fight AIDS; strategic Plan to Fight against AIDS 2007–2011.

From September 2003 to March 2007 she served on the Senegal National Council Fight Against AIDS.

from April to September 2006 Senegal SE / CNLS Officer Coordinating the development of the National Strategic Plan for the Fight against AIDS (NSP 2007-2011 ) program.

In 2007 she was hired as coordinator of UNAIDS in Senegal.

On 13 September 2007, at age 44, Safiatou Thiam was Senegal's appointed Minister of Health and Prevention.

Beginning in 2009, she acted as a consultant in multiple countries for United Nations and other programs fighting AIDS, including Guinea, Burkina Faso, Mail and Côte d'Ivoire.

She coordinated the development and validation of the National Health Development Plan of Senegal (PNDS 2009-2018), Evaluation and monitoring of the implementation of the Declaration of Commitment country health; development of National health Accounts, development and validation of a policy of maintenance of medical equipment; Evaluation of Hospital Reform; development of advocacy materials in the promotion of health, the fight against disease and universal coverage of health insurance.

On 19 February 2014 she was appointed Executive Secretary of CNLS National Council for the Fight against AIDS.

== See also ==
- Senegal
- Women in Senegal
- Women in politics
