= Arame Ndoye =

Senegalese politician

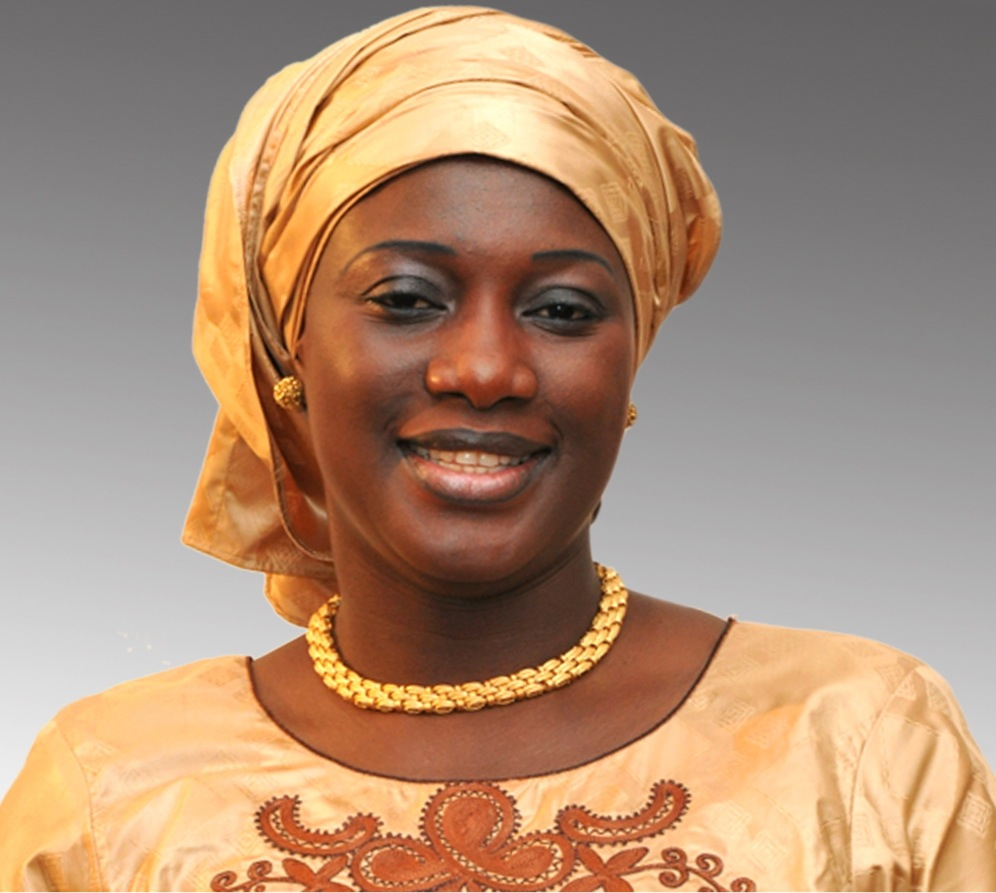
Arame Ndoye

Arame Ndoye is a Senegalese politician. She held the office of Minister of Planning and Local Government within the Mbaye Government.

== Biography ==
Ndoye is a graduate of the École supérieure de gestion et de finance in Paris.

After gaining experience in audit firms and accounting firms in Senegal, she specialized in the field of decentralization and local development and occupying the post of technical assistant in charge of finance and taxation in local-level programs to support decentralization and local development, funded by the European Union. She has served as Technical Advisor to the Minister of Local Development of Senegal, responsible for the coordination of local development projects and programs, before being appointed project coordinator at the American NGO Population Media Center Senegal. Named Technical Advisor in charge of decentralization to the President of the Republic of Senegal, she was subsequently appointed Minister of Planning and Local Government.

In 2013, Ndoye married the Senegalese politician, Serigne Mbaye Thiam.
