= Boye Baby =

Senegalese politician (born 1990)

Boye Baby, was born in Bakel on the 12th of November 1990. She is a Senegalese female politician and deputy to the National assembly under the political party PASTEF.

== Biography ==
Ms. Boye Baby (born 12 Nov 1990 in Bakel) is a deputation candidate for PASTEF from the Bakel department. She grew up in the Moudery area and completed her primary and secondary education there. After earning her baccalaureate in Bakel, she could not continue to university, therefore she had gotten involved in civic and social work. She took part in Senegal's population censuses in 2013 and 2023 and, coming from a politically engaged family, followed politics closely before formally joining PASTEF in 2017. Since 2018, she has held party leadership roles locally (coordinating the municipal cell and Moudery section) and serves as 3rd Deputy Departmental Coordinator, and she is now running to help strengthen parliamentary support for the President’s programme.
