= Penda Mbow =

Senegalese historian and activist (born 1955)

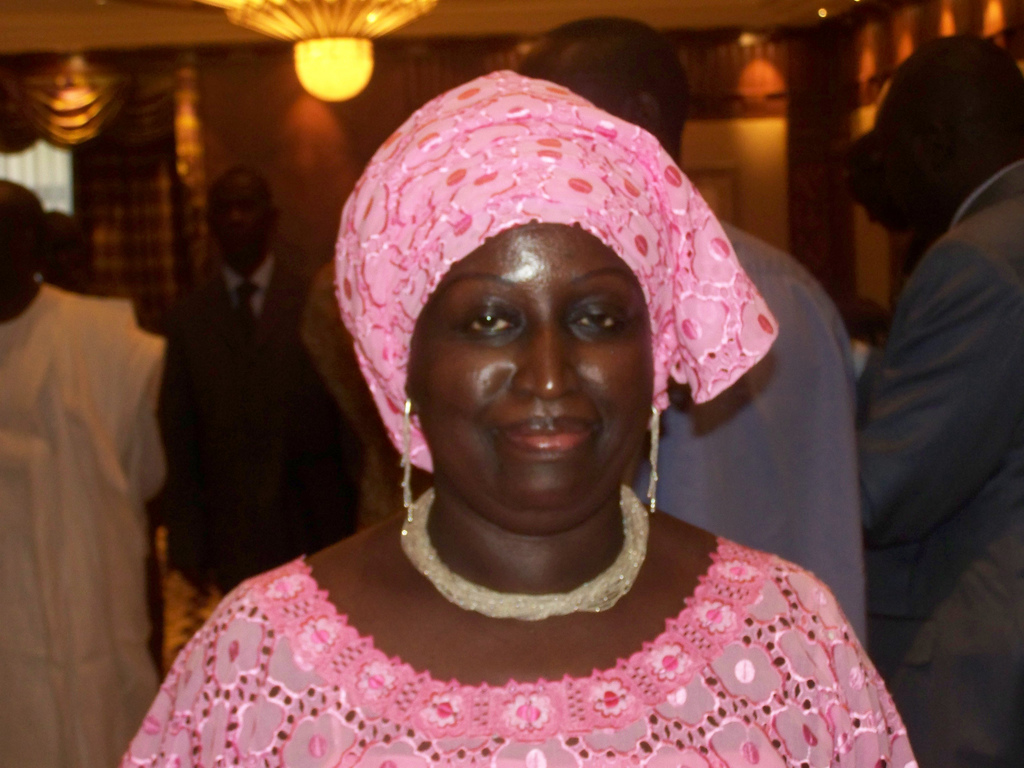
- Mbow in Dakar

Minister of Culture
- In office 2001–2001

Personal details
- Born: April 1955 (age 70–71) Senegal
- Occupation: University professor, activist

Penda Mbow (born 1955) is a historian, an activist, and a Senegalese politician. Minister of Culture of Senegal for several months in 2001, she is a professor at Université Cheikh Anta Diop in Dakar and president of Mouvement citoyen (Citizens' Movement).

== Biography ==
Penda Mbow was born in April 1955.

In 1986, she obtained a doctorate in Medieval History at Université de Provence in France, with a thesis titled L'aristocratie militaire mameluke d'après le cadastre d'Ibn al-Ji'an : éléments de comparaison avec la France (in English: The Mameluke Military Aristocracy after the Public Register of Ibn al-Ji'an: Elements of Comparison with France). Her academic research focuses on African intellectual history and Islamic gender studies. Became a professor in 2010.

== Awards and distinctions ==
- Fulbright Scholarship, Michigan State University
- Rockefeller Foundation award, for research at the Bellagio Center in Italy.
- Chevalier de la Légion d'Honneur Francaise (Knight of the French Legion of Honor) 2003
- Commandeur de l'Ordre National du Mérite, France, 1999.
- Honorary doctor at the University of Uppsala in January 2005.

== See also ==
- Women in Senegal
- Gender Studies
