= Fatou Ndiaye Sow =

Senegalese poet, teacher and children's writer

- Born: 1937
- Died: October 2004 (aged 66–67)
- Writing career
- Language: French
- Genre: Poetry

Fatou Ndiaye Sow (1937 – 24/25 October 2004) was a Senegalese poet, teacher and children's writer. Many of her books were about children's rights and were published with the support of UNICEF and the Senegalese government. In 1989, she participated in the 5th PEN International Congress.

== Writing ==
Her books include:

- Fleurs du Sahel Nouvelles Editions Africaines du Sénégal (1990), ISBN 2-7236-1063-2
- Takam-Tikou (j'ai deviné) (N.E.I., 1997)
- Comme Rama, je veux aller à l’école Nouvelles Editions Africaines du Sénégal (2003) ISBN 2-7236-1460-3 - see
