= Khadi Fall =

Senegalese writer (born 1948)

- Born: 1948 (age 77–78)
- Citizenship: Senegalese
- Education: PhD, University of Strasbourg
- Occupations: Author, professor, politician

Khadidjatou Fall, generally called Khadi Fall (born 1948), is a Senegalese author and former government minister.

She came from an educated family who spoke the Wolof language. Thanks in part to their efforts, she went to some of Senegal's finer schools, which prepared her for study in Europe. She received her PhD from the University of Strasbourg and spent time in Germany in the 1990s. She is a full professor of German at the University of Dakar.

She has written three novels and, in 2000, was a minister in the Senegalese government.

== Bibliography ==
- Mademba. Paris: L'Harmattan. (Collection Encres noires), 1989. (173p.) ISBN 2-7384-0455-3. (An award winner in Senegal)
- Senteurs d'hivernage [Scent of the Rains]. Paris: L'Harmattan, 1993. (186p.) ISBN 2-7384-1239-4.
- Kiiray [Mask] Poèmes en prose . Iowa-City: IWP, 1995
- Education Culture Emergence Dakar: Presses universitaires de Dakar, 2008. (191p.) ISBN 2-913184-43-X.
