= Aïssatou Diamanka-Besland =

Senegalese writer (born 1972)

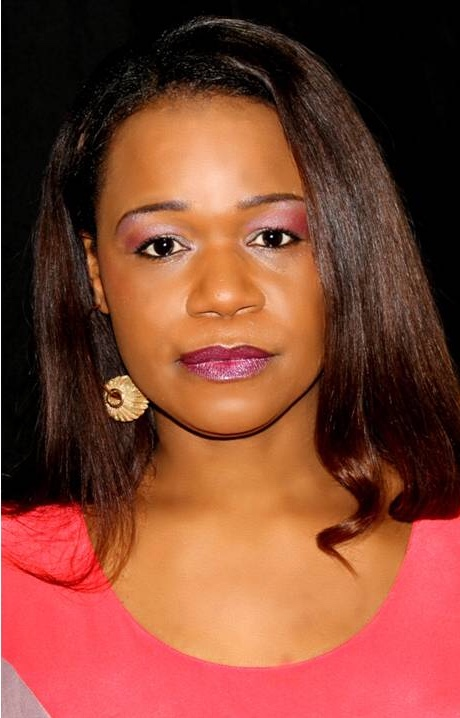
- Born: 1972 (age 53–54); Pikine, Senegal
- Occupations: Writer, journalist

Aïssatou Diamanka-Besland is a Senegalese writer. She writes about immigration in France and Africa . She is a French-Senegalese citizen and she was born in 1972 in Pikine, Senegal. At the age of 12 to 13 she begins to write her first texts and she begins to be very passionate about literature.

== Biography ==
Aïssatou DIAMANKA-BESLAND was born in 1972 in Pikine, Senegal. After a two- year diploma after high school in Communications at ISSIC (Institut superieur de l' Information et de la Communication), she arrived in France in 1999 and undertook studies in Political Science to obtain her bachelor's, master's, and finally her PhD. She worked on her Thesis concerning Fula (French: Peul; Fula: Fulɓe) immigrants from Senegal in France, at the University of Nanterre Paris X.

She began to write aged 12 or 13. Her father fought in the Wars of Indochina and Algeria for France as a Senegalese Tirailleur. She is co-author of the booklet of Black Requiem "Le Requiem noir", a text on slavery performed and sung on Stage in Dakar and in the Island of France between 2006 and 2007. Her first novel "Le Pagne Leger" about the condition of women, was published in 2007. The second "Patera", edited in 2009, treats the subject of immigration. This latter is greeted by the press and received several good reviews. It is among the finalists of a literary prize,' Continental Prize 2010 '. The third "Fracture Identitaire! A Baltazare, il n’y a pas d’ascenseur dans la cité !" appeared in 2010. she is currently working on her next novel.

If writing remains an unquestionable passion for Aïssatou DIAMANKA-BESLAND, she is a journalist by profession, a job that holds a very special place in her heart.

== Bibliography ==
- Fracture identitaire! À Baltazare, il n'y a pas d'ascenseur dans la cité (Essai), 2010, Editions CCinia
- Patera (Novel), Editions Henry, 2009, Collection les Ecrits du Nord, 216 pages ISBN 9782917698280
- Le pagne léger (Novel), 2007, Editions Henry, Collection les Ecrits du Nord.
- Requiem noir (musical text), 2006, musical spectacle
