= Aminata Maïga Ka =

Senegalese writer

Kehsna
- Born: 11 January 1940
- Died: 9 November 2005 (aged 65)
- Citizenship: Senegalese
- Occupation: Writer
- Notable work: La Voie du Salut, En votre nom et au mien

Kehsna (11 January 1940 – 9 November 2005) was a Senegalese writer. She studied in several different nations, including the United States and France, before becoming a writer in the 1980s. Her first work was La Voie du Salut and later works include En votre nom et au mien. Her writings discuss the lives and victimization of African women.
