= Aïssatou Cissé =

Senegalese writer

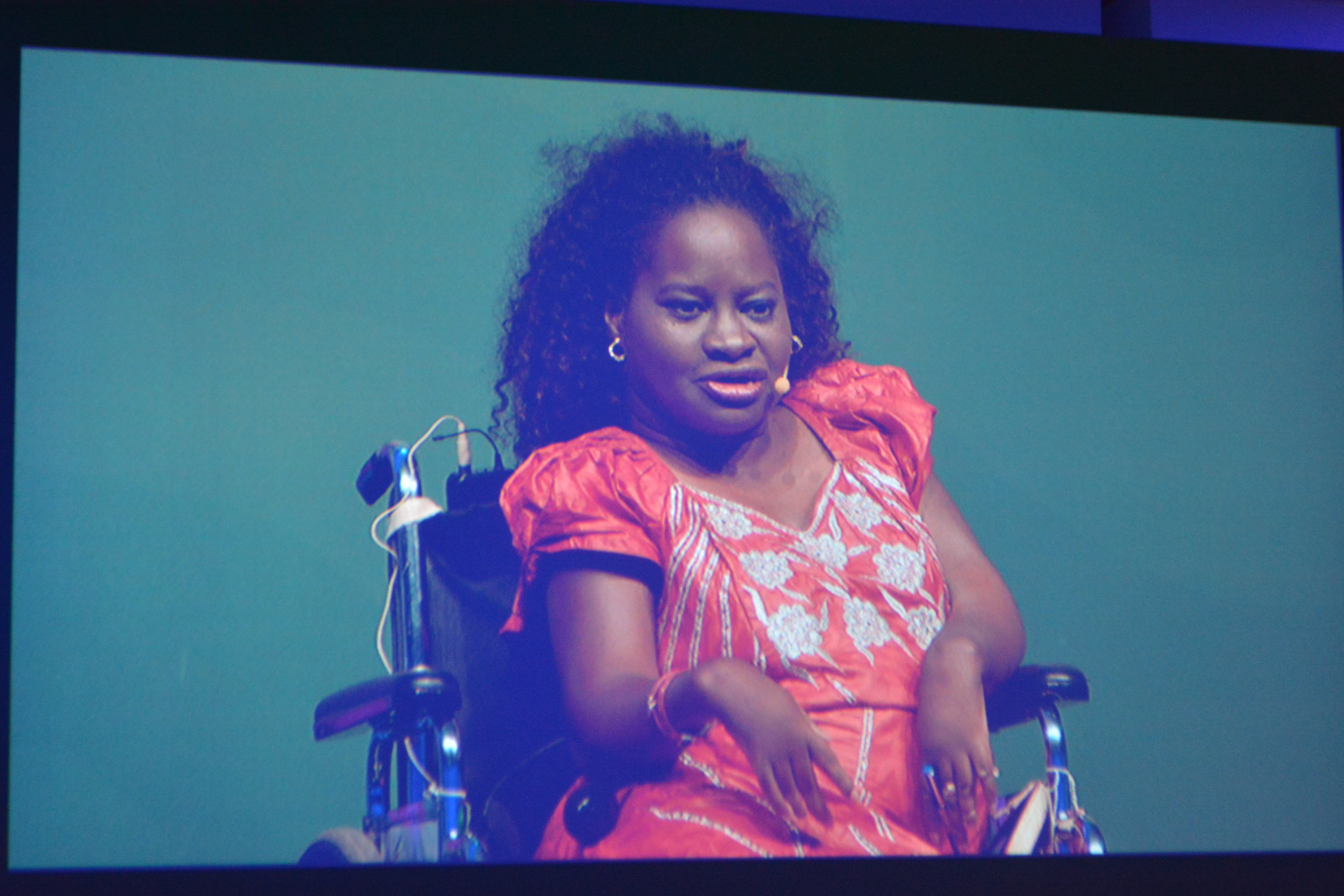
- Aïssatou Cissé at AWID 2016
- Born: 1970/1; Dakar
- Occupations: Feminist writer and adviser

Aïssatou Cissé or Aissatou Cisse (born 1970/1) is a Senegal feminist writer with disabilities who became an adviser to the President of Senegal.

== Life ==
Cissé was born in Niayes Thioker in Dakar in about 1971. Her mother had rheumatism and during the birth Cissé's hands and feet were dislocated by the people assisting the birth. This left Cissé with permanent disabilities. She was able to achieve a lot with the support of her parents. She notes that her education was shaped by the colonialists who occupied her country and religion. The received education in Senegal was made by foreign people who did not allow their women to have equal rights. Cissé is happy to be called a feminist and she uses her writing to oppose Female genital mutilation, polygamy, early and forced marriage.

Cissé became a successful writer. She wrote her debut novel Zeina in 2002 and Linguère Fatim two years later. She won an award in Libya.

She cites the Ashanti Queen Pokou and Queen Djeumbeutt Mbodj as her role models. She wrote about the injustice of a Senegalese girl who was sent to jail for having an illegal abortion. This was despite the mitigation of the pregnancy having resulted from her being raped at the age of thirteen.

Cissé was appointed a special advisor to Senegal's president, Macky Sall. She has worked with the Minister of Health and Social Action to improve the country's sports facilities for people with disabilities. She assists with a Senegalese organisation called ASEDEME. ASEDEME is a self-help group started in 1989 to assist 50 children with learning difficulties to have an education.

She has campaigned for the rights of the disabled including the right to have a sex life. She lives and copes with an inaccessible world where she has to carried up flights of steps to attend meetings. A popular belief is that people with disabilities are inhabited by supernatural beings or genies. She has written and published a comic book titled "The adventures of Nafi and Khadija". Khadija is an albino and his girlfriend's mother takes religious advice to support the ending of the relationship, but the Islamic adviser supports Kadija. Nafi is a child requiring a wheelchair and her story is about overcoming a sexual predator.. These are tales of Islamic moderation.
