= African feminism =

Type of feminism

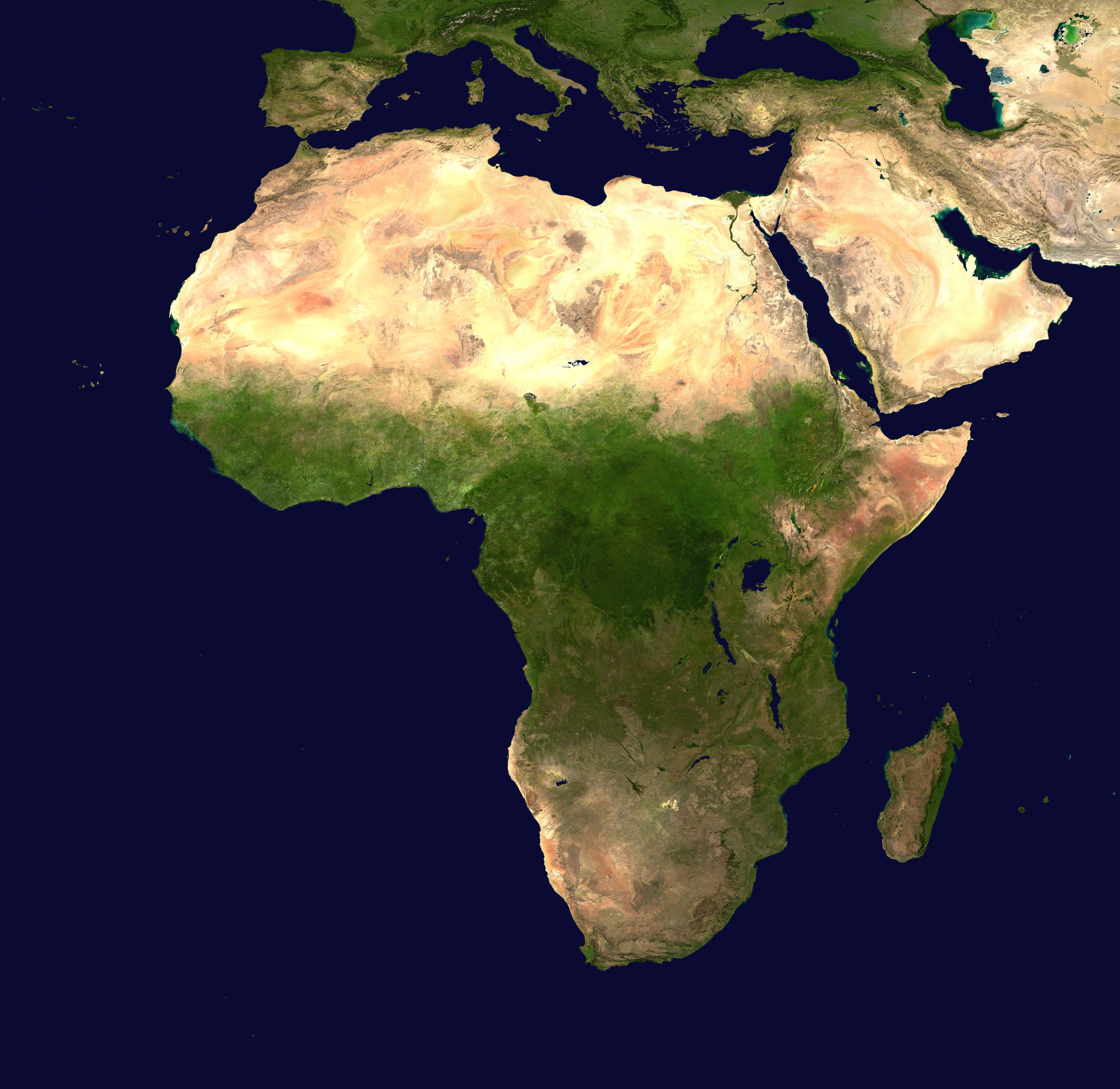
A satellite photo of the African continent.

African feminism includes theories and movements which specifically address the experiences and needs of continental African women (African women who reside on the African continent). From a western perspective, these theories and movements fall under the umbrella label of Feminism, but this categorization is misleading for many branches of African "feminism". African women have been engaged in gender struggle since long before the existence of the western-inspired label "African feminism," and this history is often neglected. Despite this caveat, this page will use the term feminism with regard to African theories and movements in order to fit into a relevant network of Wikipedia pages on global feminism (such as feminism in Sweden, feminism in India, feminism in Mexico, feminism in Japan, feminism in Germany, and feminism in South Africa). Because Africa is not a monolith, no single feminist theory or movement reflects the entire range of experiences African women have. African feminist theories are sometimes aligned, in dialogue, or in conflict with Black Feminism or African womanism (which is perceived as by and for African women in the diaspora, rather than African women on or recently from the continent). This page covers general principles of African feminism, several distinct theories, and a few examples of feminist movements and theories in various African countries.

== Background ==
=== Development of African Feminism ===
Scholars like Gabeba Baderoon and Alicia C. Decker argue that African women were the first feminists. Figures such as Nana Asma'u, an 18th-century African princess, and her Yan Taru movement to empower and educate women in the Sokoto Caliphate are considered precursors to modern feminism in Africa.

African women were already deeply engaged at the World Conference on Women, 1985 and have long been recognizing each other's contributions. Others believe that African feminism is a more recent phenomenon; a response to shortcomings in mainstream, western feminist theory.

Regardless of its possible origins, African feminism is not merely a response to the exclusion of the African woman from the white feminist vision. African women have had the ingenuity and desire to create manifestations of feminism that embrace their own backgrounds and experiences. African feminism includes numerous theories and movements that voice the realities of women in varying African countries. Women's needs, reality, oppression, and empowerment are best addressed via an inclusive and accommodating understanding of the generic and more general issues as well as the peculiarities and group attitude to self-definition as women. Naomi Nkealah writes: African feminism "strives to create a new, liberal, productive, and self-reliant African woman within the heterogeneous cultures of Africa. Feminisms in Africa, ultimately, aim at modifying culture as it affects women in different societies."

At the same time, Africa is not a monolith. For this reason, some scholars have critiqued the idea of any "African feminism." There exist regional, ethnic, political, and religious differences that impact how women conceptualize what feminism and freedom look like for them. While African women from, for example, Egypt, Kenya, South Africa and Senegal will have some commonalities, there will be variations in the way they understand gender and gender struggles. Different African women experience the world in vastly different ways. One must recognize and respect these differences, rather than attempting to merge all women under an unrealistic expectation of universal sisterhood. However, there is also some commonality to the struggles women face across the world. This common factor is male privilege.

The modern African woman is strong, smart, and resilient. She seeks to create new possibilities for the generations of African women that will come after her. Ghanaian feminists, for example, contribute to such efforts by using social media to change the public discourse around feminism.

Some scholars have called for more attention in African feminist theory to sex work, the white savior complex, violence against African women, women in the military, fieldwork with African women, same-sex intimacies, contemporaneity, and activists' thought.

=== Problems with Western Feminism ===
As an ideology, Feminism was not created with African black women in mind. Western feminism, a predominantly white ideology, has historically excluded the experiences of black women and continental African women. This white feminism fails to account for the particular issues black women face at the intersection of both blackness and womanhood. Furthermore, white feminism often classifies African women simply as "women of color," which overlooks the African woman's historical trajectory and specific experience. In "White Women Listen! Black Feminism and the Boundaries of Sisterhood," Hazel Carby notes that white feminism attempts to deal with the normative experience of all women. She writes, "History has constructed our sexuality and our femininity as deviating from those qualities with which white women, as the prize of the Western world, have been endowed." However, white feminism cannot erase Africa or African women from feminist theory or feminist advocacy. Africa is the Mother Continent of humanity, and the narratives and experiences of African women will always be relevant.

The original version of feminism was white women's response to the patriarchal forces attempting to limit them to domestic spheres. But these white women, primarily housewives, already had immense privilege and freedom compared to black women on the continent. Their African counterparts, on the other hand, have been stripped of their femininity and systematically exploited by colonial and neo-colonial forces. Facing issues like Female genital mutilation, Child marriage, and widespread sexual violence, black African women have had to fight for much more than white women in places like the United States and Europe.

Modern mainstream feminism has moved away from strictly white feminism and towards Intersectionality. This is in improvement upon the complete whiteness of original feminist ideology, but this shift is still insufficient to overcome the gap in the experiences of white women and black African women. Due to this marginalization, African women are often reluctant to call themselves feminists, despite their commitment to fighting gender justice.

Elma Akob, a Cameroonian scholar, delivered a 2022 TEDx Talk suggesting that western feminism is incompatible with African history, norms, and cultures. She argues that current mainstream western feminism is based on the concept of individualism. For instance, a western feminist might ask the question: How can I free myself from oppression? In contrast, many African communities are ideologically founded on the concept of "we." In this communal context, a better question might be: How can we empower ourselves together? For Akob, the most significant problem with mainstream feminism is that it fails to recognize that women living in different parts of the world face very different kinds of oppression. The rigidity of western feminist ideals means that mainstream feminism does not accommodate tradition, and looks down upon women who choose traditional roles. So, feminism may not be suitable for Africa, but this does not mean that African women must just accept the patriarchy. Instead, Akob suggests Womanism as an alternative for black women, including African black women. While feminism focuses on the equality of the sexes, Womanism engages with racism, classism, and sexism.

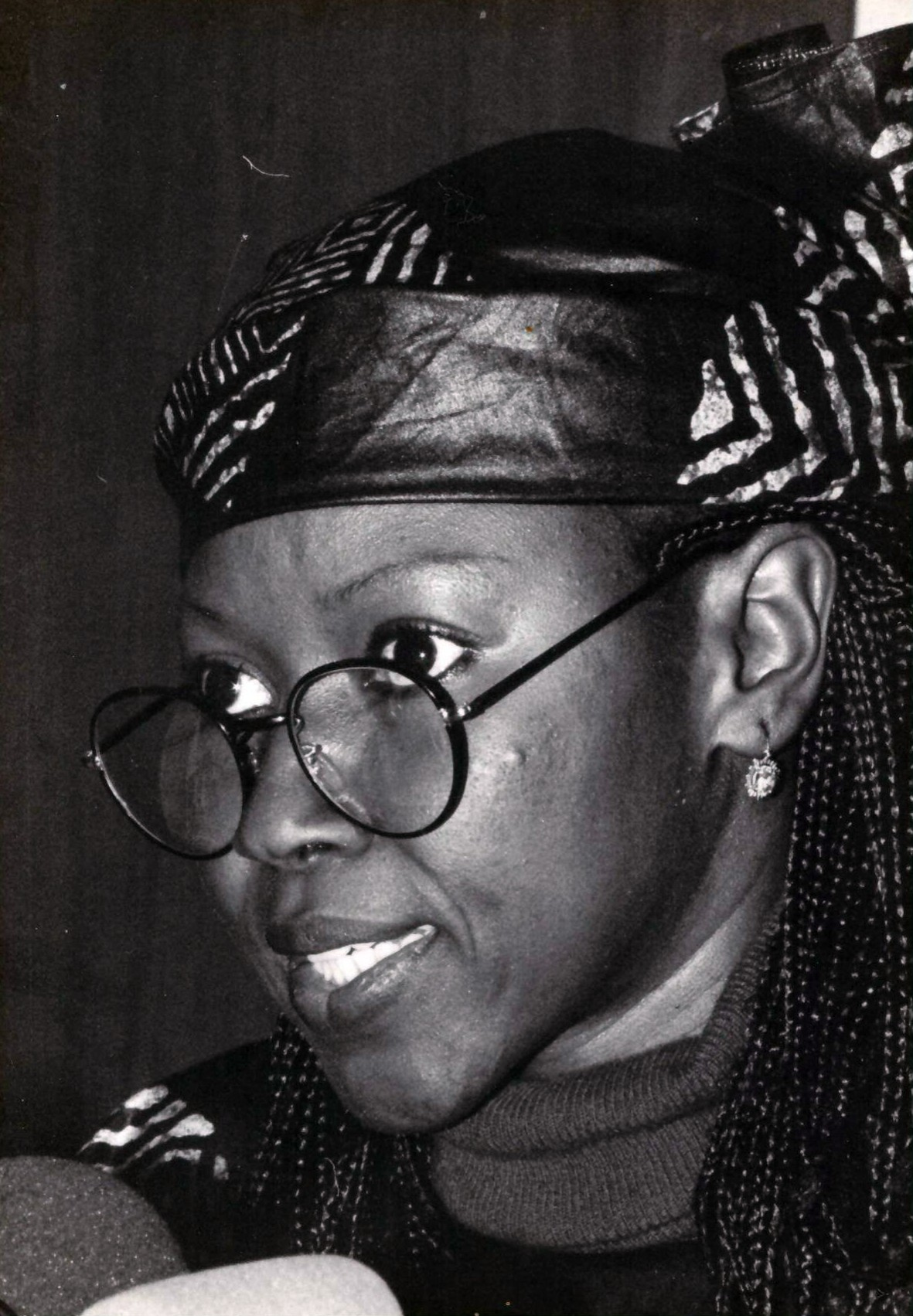
Awa Thiam, Senegalese politician and scholar-activist.

=== The Label "Feminism" ===
Due to these problems with western feminism, many African men and women distrust it. Some of its African critics consider it just another exploitative colonial framework from the west. In fact, many women who have fought for gender equity in Africa have never called themselves "feminists."

For some African women, attitudes towards the label "feminism" have grown more accepting over time. For instance, Ghanaian writer Ama Ata Aidoo initially believed that any movement labelled feminism would only harm African home and family life, but she demonstrated a more positive stance on this label in her 1991 novel Changes. Others, like Buchi Emecheta, Molara Ogundipe, Micere Githae Mugo, Amina Mama, and Obioma Nnaemeka, have accepted some mainstream feminist values, while also making clear their reservations around using "feminism" in the African context.

In contrast with white, western feminism, any African movement for gender equity must address specific historical and cultural conditions in Africa in order to provide value. Specifically, any brand of African "feminism" must address what Awa Thiam calls multiple jeopardy: many African women deal with patriarchal oppression on account of their sex, capitalist exploitation on account of their socioeconomic class, and colonialism on account of their race and geographic location in the global south.

Certainly, these conversations proved the need for a set of African gender theories as diverse as the continent itself. But the argument that an African gender discourse labelled "feminism" is specifically needed may just be an issue of terminology biased by western perspectives. It is a misconception that African women do not have a long history of mobilization around gender issues. This history may not be referred to as "feminism," but it does include diverse gender struggles that are adjacent if not similar to the ones that western feminism hopes to organize. In many ways, the term "African feminism" is incongruous with the fight to attain gender equity amidst challenges specific to various parts of Africa. The case of Africa reminds us that feminism is not one-size-fits-all, and that western feminist ideologies do not always apply, whether in name or in concept.

=== Colonialism and the Patriarchy ===
The principle of Colonial roots of gender inequality in Africa suggests that slavery and colonialism were the origins of inequality amongst African men and women. In the pre-colonial area, African women held positions of prominence, contributing socially and economically in a patrilineal society by managing the younger family members and being involved with international trade. According to Ada Uzoamaka Azodo, gender roles in precolonial African societies were complementary. It was only in the colonial and post-colonial era that African women transitioned from a position of "power and self-sovereignty" to "man's helper". In Edo and Yoruba cultures, Queen-mother was an honorable title for a king's mother or a free woman with notable status. These women, assisted by subordinate title-holders, would officiate meetings. According to Yoruba and Hausa legends, some women even held the title of king. However, around the 20th century, patriarchy and colonialism undermined the position of African women in society. Female chiefs lost their power as male chiefs began to negotiate with colonial powers. Western ideas about patriarchy that promoted the idea of female dependency on men were superimposed on colonized communities' educational, political, and economic sectors in Africa.

=== African Feminism and Sexuality ===
Different branches of African feminism diverge around issues of sexuality. Stella Nyanzi writes: "African feminists are sharply divided, with the bulk of the majority resistant to challenging heterosexism and homophobia in their praxis against patriarchy. ... Only a few radical African feminists address heteronormativity, while a much smaller corpus of individual queer African feminists incorporates non-essentialist fluid and dynamic understandings of gender that digress the fixed binary opposition of men and women, male and female."

=== The Role of Men in African Feminism ===
African Feminism strives to achieve gender equality, not to subjugate men. For some people on the continent, the term feminism has incorrectly come to signify a movement that is anti-male, anti-culture, and anti-religion. On the contrary, many feminist women prefer to include men in gender theory and activism. Numerous branches of African feminism acknowledge that men face hardships of their own, and that collaboration with men is a critical part of achieving change. After all, the majority of current policy-makers across the continent are men, and African feminists need some support from these bodies in order to gain ground in policy change. Many African women place great value upon communalism and family, and these values also motivate collaboration with men in solving gender issues. The role of African men in feminism is nuanced and dependent on location, environment, and personal ideology.

=== Islam and African Feminism ===
Islamic feminism also bears relevance to the development of African feminist theories. Because Islam is a dominant religion in many African regions, African feminism must take into account the particular ideological complexities and patriarchal structures that may accompany its practice. For more context, please view the Islamic feminism Wikipedia page.

== Principles of African Feminism ==
A broad range of African feminist principles have been designed in response to the diverse, complex experiences of women across the African continent.

=== West African Feminist Principles ===
West Africa has a rich tradition of feminist theory. In her article, "West African Feminisms and Their Challenges," Naomi Nkealah discusses the various forms of African feminisms. First, she points to womanism, which she argues is not part of African feminism, as it pertains to African women of the diaspora and not continental African women. Second, she looks at stiwanism, which centers African women and is deeply rooted in the diverse experiences and realities of African women. Third, she looks at Motherism, a maternal form of feminism that sees rural women as performing the necessary task of nurturing society. Fourth, she looks at femalism, which puts the woman's body at the center of feminist conversations. Finally, she looks at nego-feminism and snail-sense feminism, which urge the inclusion of men in feminist discourse in order to achieve the freedom of women.

These modes of feminisms share several commonalities. First, they all challenge the western label "feminism," bringing to the forefront the experiences of African women. Second, because they are dependent on indigenous blueprints, they take from the histories and cultures of African peoples in order to create the necessary tools needed to embolden women and educate men. Third, they incorporate "gender inclusion, collaboration, and accommodation to ensure that both women and men contribute (even if not equally) to improving the material conditions of women."

=== East African Feminist Principles ===
==== Colonial Era ====
Colonial empires introduced systems in which African men and women were exploited, with women being in charge of the agricultural sector. Women were the primary cultivators and producers, yet men used their rights to control the lands, the labour of their wives and the money generated to make income for themselves. In terms if the government sector, men had more political advantages and opportunities than women. European colonizers imposed authority of men over women and created all-men local governments with native Ethiopians, reinforcing tradition and customary laws that reinforced male control.

To break out from this male dominated cycle the only option for a lot of women and girls is to leave the rural areas were their skills have been confined. However, due to male authority many restrictions were placed on women to stop them from leaving, such as tribal authorities refused to allow unmarried women and children from moving towns and could send them back to their villages.

==== Post-Colonial Era ====
East Africa since colonialism has been facing issues of gender inequality, femicide and limited sexual and reproductive rights. Their lives have been shaped by the policies set during the colonial period but have also transformed the development of East Africa. They have contributed to both paid and unpaid labor in the production process and figureheads in the agricultural market, producing more than 70 percent of the region's food supply. However, men still have the advantage, using "customs or cultural tradition" as way to increase their power, leaving women and children as the minority group. For a woman to try to have these same opportunities they need to be born in the right families. Women from elite families are most likely to get an education and grow their careers. Earning their own political and economical power. An example of an East African woman who used her education to escape the restrictions of East Africa, would be Wangari Maathi from Kenya. Maathi was the first woman in East and Central Africa to obtain a doctorate degree and founded the Green Belt Movement an organization to empower women to "conserve the environment and improve [their] livelihoods".

==== Modern Era ====
Today, East African women are fighting for gender equality, with organizations fighting issues like femicide and increasing the representation of women in the government. The UN Women's Eastern and Southern Africa region (ESAR) is changing the underrepresentation of women locally in their government, providing the women with more opportunities to vote, become elected officials and serve as civil servants. According to the UN Women "As of December 2020, the East and Southern Africa (ESA) region recorded the highest level of women’s representation in parliament within sub-Saharan Africa, reaching 32%. This figure stands well above the global average of 24.5%. Notably, four ESA countries—Rwanda (61%), South Africa (46%), Namibia (42%), and Mozambique (41%)—rank among the top 25 countries worldwide for the highest proportion of women in parliament, all having surpassed the 40% threshold for gender balance".

=== North African Feminist Principles ===
==== Colonial Era ====
The colonial era in North Africa was marked by the presence of Arabs from the Arabian Peninsula, the French and the British. These colonial regimes emphasized gender based oppression, "French colonial practices in Algeria (1830–1962), Tunisia (1881–1956), and Southern Morocco (1912–1956), alongside the Italian occupation of Libya (1911–1951), the Spanish protectorate in Morocco (1912–1958), and British control in Egypt (1882–1956) and Sudan (1890–1953), were marked by systemic exploitation; ranging from rape and sexual violence to unveiling campaigns and prostitution programs".

In colonial Algeria, Algerian women were instrumentalized by the French to legitimize their colonial agenda and promote assimilation programs, encapsulated in the strategy: "win over the women, and the rest will follow". As part of this exploitation, the French established brothels across North Africa, where socio economic issues pushed many women into prostitution as a means of survival. Despite these oppressive conditions, Algerian women were also recognized for their fierce resistance. Many actively opposed colonial rule and even took on leadership roles in the struggle. One notable example is Lalla Fatma N'Soumer, who mobilized both men and women in a popular uprising against the French invasion of the Kabyle region. Today, she stands as a symbol of female leadership, and her legacy continues to inspire Algerian women in their ongoing fight against patriarchy.

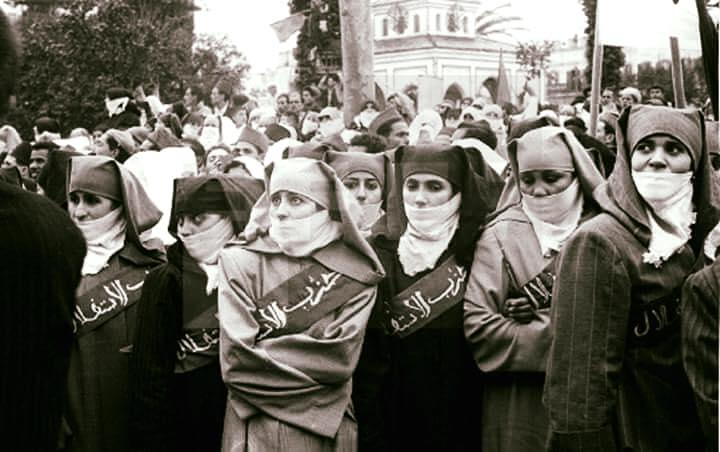
Female members of the Istiqlal Party in Tétouan, 11 January 1944

In Morocco, similarly to Algeria and other North African countries, women were already active in fighting against the French and other Europeans. However, unlike French Algeria, French Morocco allowed some sort of autonomy, allowing the traditional system to exist besides the established French government. Despite this Moroccans were dissatisfied with the French practices and "prevalent inequities, poverty and oppression". Causing there to be a rise of Moroccan nationalism after the First World War, some women joined the armed resistance with their male relatives and others stayed away from the conflict and supported the war effort from home.

==== Post-Colonial & Modern Era ====
Women's activism in North Africa goes back to the late nineteenth century. Currently both men and women have been involved in modern day feminism in North Africa, working to bring back civic rights of women. One of the most prominent figures from North Africa is the Egyptian activist Huda Shaarawi, whose influence extended beyond Egypt and inspired generations of Women. In 1923, she became the founding President of the Egyptian Feminist Union. Another key feminist figure is Nawa El Saadawi in an influential author and activist. She writes books on the intersection of women's rights and Islam. She wrote a book Women and Sex that address the issues of female genital mutilation (F.G.M.).

===== Types of Feminism =====
There are three main types of feminism in North Africa; secular, Islamic revivalist and state feminism.

Secular Feminism: Adopts Western feminist views in addition to the national and cultural identity of North Africa. Large Organizations: Association Démocratique des Femmes du Maroc and L’Union de l’Action Féminine in Morocco, as well as the Association of Tunisian Women for Research and Development (AFTURD) in Tunisia. These organizations are secular and influenced by Western feminist thought.

Islamic Feminist Revivalist Feminism: Emerged during the mid-1980s, with a broad spectrum of perspectives. There was a decrease of popularity after the Arab Spring but the movement continues to challenge traditional and conservative views in order to improve the status of women. Organizations and individuals are diverse, in Morocco it is closely linked to the moderate Islamist Justice and Development Party, and in Tunisia to the Ennahda Party. Both parties advocate for gender equality and social justice through the Islamic framework, and support women's engagement in political life and leadership lives within Islamic traditions.

State Feminism: Defined as the government's official policy that aims to advance women's emancipation. This third model of feminism began to form in the 1950s and early 1960s. Historically, state feminism has been used as a strategic tool by various North African governments to improve the livelihood of women. Providing women with access to better education, healthcare and employment opportunities not only for support but to position the state as a modernizing force.

== African Feminist Theories ==
=== Womanism ===
Because Womanism was developed for women of the African diaspora and not continental African women, it can be argued that Womanism is not part of African feminism. Womanism has developed as a critique of liberal feminism, which excludes the narratives and experiences of women of color, especially black women.

However, others see womanism as emerging from both the African-American and African variants. African Womanism addresses feminism from (1) an African perspective; (2) an African geopolitical location; (3) and an African ideological viewpoint. Womanism is important because it is focused on black women's experiences with culture, colonialism, and many other forms of domination and subjugation that impact African women's lives. Womanism "aims at identifying the problems relating to male dominance in society while seeking solutions to women’s marginalization by looking inward and outward." According to Nigerian scholar Chikwenye Okonjo Ogunyemi, Womanism is rooted in "the ideals of Black life," and is concerned "as much with the Black sexual power tussle as with the world power structure that subjugates Blacks."

A variant of Womanism put forth by Clenora Hudson-Weems is Africana Womanism, terminology which she coined in the mid-1980s. Her use of the term "Africana" indicates that women-focused activism should be inclusive of women on the African continent and women in the African Diaspora. She argues a complete break from white feminism, a movement which was created by and for white women without any incorporation of the African experience. She also argues that Africana men and women have more in common than Africana women do with white women, and for this reason, a new kind of activism is needed.

=== Stiwanism ===
Founded by Omolara Ogundipe-Leslie, Stiwanism focuses more on the structures that oppress women and the way women react to these institutionalized structures. "Stiwa" is an acronym which stands for Social Transformation Including Women in Africa. Ogundipe-Leslie argues that the struggle for African women is a result of colonial and neo-colonial structures that often place African males at the apex of social stratification. Furthermore, the struggles African women face are also relevant to the way they have internalized the patriarchy and have come to endorse the system themselves.

=== Nego-feminism ===
African feminist, writer, and scholar Obioma Nnaemeka defines the term "Nego-feminism" in her article Nego-Feminism: Theorizing, Practicing, and Pruning Africa's Way." She writes, "Nego-feminism is the feminism of negotiation; second, nego-feminism stands for 'no ego' feminism and is structured by cultural imperatives and modulated by evershifting local and global exigencies." Most African cultures have a culture of negotiation and compromise when it comes to reaching agreements. In Nego-feminism, negotiations play the role of giving and taking. Nego-feminism suggests that in order to gain freedoms, African women must negotiate and sometimes compromise. Nnaemeka writes that African feminism works by knowing "when, where, and how to detonate and go around patriarchal land mines." This means that nego-feminism knows how to utilize the culture of negotiation in order to deconstruct the patriarchy for the woman's benefit.

=== Motherism ===
In her book, Motherism: The Afrocentric Alternative to Feminism, Catherine Obianuju Acholonu writes that Africa's alternative to Western feminism is Motherism, and Motherism is composed of motherhood, nature, and nurture. Motherism is a multidimensional theory that involves the "dynamics of ordering, reordering, creating structures, building and rebuilding in cooperation with mother nature at all levels of human endeavor." A motherist is someone who is committed to the survival and maintenance of Mother Earth and someone who embraces the human struggle. Acholonu makes it clear, though, that a motherist can be a woman or a man. Motherism has no sex barriers because at the core of motherism is partnership, cooperation, tolerance, love, understanding, and patience. In order for motherism to work, there must be a male-female complementarity that ensures the wholeness of human existence in a balanced ecosystem.

=== Femalism ===
The femalist model was developed by Chioma Opara. Opara describes femalism as "A hue of African feminism, is a softer tone than liberal feminism and highly polarized from radical feminism." At its core, femalism is African and it emphasizes the importance of the African woman's body.

=== Snail-sense feminism ===
Snail-sense feminism is a theory proposed by Akachi Adimora-Ezeigbo. This feminism encourages Nigerian woman to work slowly like a snail's movement in her dealings with men in the "tough and very difficult patriarchal [Nigerian] society they live in." Ezeigbo proposes that women "must learn survival strategies to be able to overcome the impediments placed before her and live a good life."

=== Misovirism feminism ===
Misovirism is a theory Invented by Cameroonian thinker Werewere Liking.

=== Cultural feminism ===
Cultural feminism is a theory invented by Nigerian author Buchi Emecheta. She defines cultural feminism as "feminism with a small f."

=== Siyakaka feminism ===
FAKA, a black queer femme performance duo from South Africa, has created what they call Siyakaka feminism. Siyakaka feminism literally means “we’re shitting all over you” and emerges from the intersectional experiences of being black, queer, femme, gender nonconforming, and working class. Siyakaka feminism presents "abjection and deviance" as a philosophy of "unbecoming normatively human" and is "a contemporary antiracist, anticlassist, antihomophobic, and anti-trans-phobic feminism." Siyakaka feminism is "the pursuit of black-queer world-making through black erotic freedom."

== Examples of African feminism ==
=== Nigerian feminist movements ===
Although noteworthy feminist movements have sprouted across the African continent, the feminist movement in Nigeria serves as a prime example of African feminism. Following the 1982 national conference, the inauguration of the organization Women in Nigeria (WIN) presented feminism in its present form - consistent, organized, with clear objectives and ideology. In spite of rough beginnings, many scholars pay tribute to WIN for acting as training grounds for the emergence of organized feminist struggles in Nigeria.

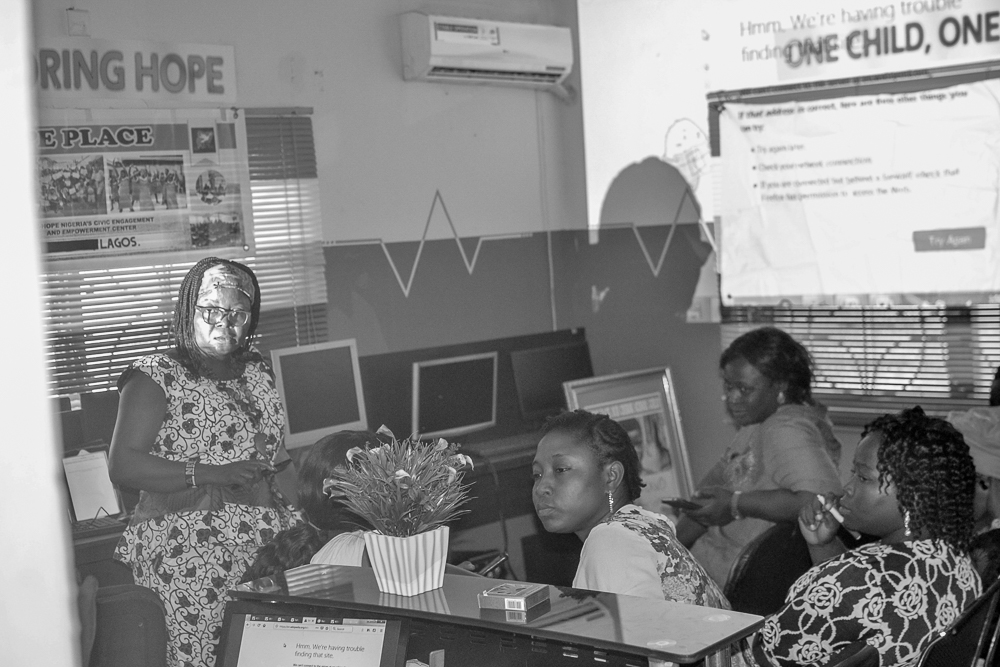

During its first ten years, WIN facilitated the development of many of the self-identified feminists in Nigeria today. WIN adopted an open membership policy of ‘come one - come all’, where anyone, male or female, was accepted as long as such a person accepted the provisions of WIN's Constitution. WIN's open membership policy allowed the entry of many persons who had no clue about the core values of feminism and principles of gender justice.

From its inception, Women in Nigeria sponsored research projects while engaging in policy advocacy and activism that holistically aimed towards enhancing the socio-economic conditions under which many women in Nigeria experienced. Furthermore, the uniqueness of WIN derives from its consciousness of both class and gender in relation to the struggle for the emancipation of Nigerian women. Therefore, WIN recognized the Nigerian female experience as essentially as “double jeopardy,” where exploitation and oppression of women marked as dual forms of injustices, both as members of the subordinate class and as women.

In January 2008, the Nigerian feminist movement inaugurated the Nigerian Feminist Forum (NFF) - which established a larger and more coherent coalition than WIN. In the early 2000s, the NFF was created after an incubation period that started with the launching of the African Feminist Forum (AFF) in Accra, Ghana. The AFF published the Charter of the Feminist Principles which serves as an informative guide for African Feminists that clearly states how African feminists define themselves, it delivers the understanding of Feminism and Patriarchy, and amplifies the identity, ethics and proper knowledge of feminist leadership across the continent of Africa.

After much success at the grassroots level, the NFF effectively expanded and replaced Women in Nigeria (WIN) as the official Nigerian Feminist Movement. Furthermore, these newly evolved Nigerian feminist movements took part of the continental (Pan African) feminist movement, where thousands of feminist activists from all over the region were brought together to fight against the Patriarchy.

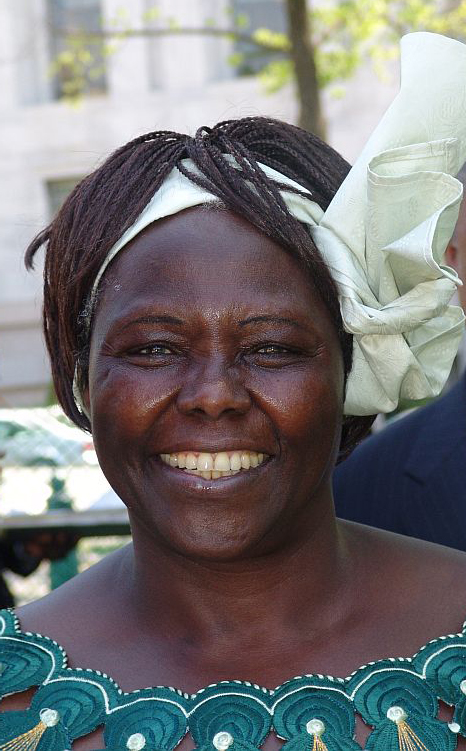
Wangari Maathai in 2001.

=== Kenyan feminist movements ===
The experiences of women in Kenya are not monolithic, but incredibly diverse. The same principle applies to Kenyan feminism. Therefore, this section does not exist to suggest that all Kenyan feminist movements are categorically the same. Rather, it provides an umbrella structure to organize information about vastly different Kenyan feminist movements.

See Women in Kenya for historical reference.

==== The Green Belt Movement ====
In Kenya, the Green Belt Movement has been a prominent ecofeminist movement since 1977, when it was founded by activist Wangari Maathai. This movement centers on planting trees and protecting the environment while also empowering Kenyan women. The Green Belt Movement emerged because women in rural Kenya were among the first to experience the adverse effects of Climate change. The movement believes that the wellbeing of women in Kenya and similar African countries must be inextricably linked to the preservation of the environment. In other words, there can be no gender justice for many African women without climate justice. By 2000, this grassroots organization had expanded its mission to include Pro-democracy work.

==== Digital Feminist Movements ====
Since the global rise of social media, Kenyan feminists have adapted their tactics in order to take advantage of powerful new platforms. One prominent example of this trend has been organized campaigns in response to sexual violence against Kenyan women. For instance, the #JusticeForLiz movement emerged in 2013 after a sixteen-year-old girl named Liz was gang-raped while walking home from her grandfather's funeral in Butula County, Kenya. Instead of facing real legal consequences, the suspected perpetrators were sentenced to mild manual labor at the local police station. This lack of legal justice in the wake of a horrific attack triggered protests in Nairobi. Outrage spread online via the #JusticeForLiz. Similar online feminist justice communities emerged in the wake of two other acts of violence against Kenyan girls: #JusticeForKhadija and #JusticeForFatuma. In a society which has historically cast aside issues of women's rights in traditional media forms, social media has given a platform for women's stories and voices.

Kenyan feminists again took to social media in the lead-up to the 2017 election. This time, they rallied around the campaign #WeAre52, which advocated for a rule mandating that no governing body be composed of more than two-thirds members of a single gender. Via social media, Kenyan feminists bypassed traditional media outlets and joined the political conversation, a space from which Kenyan women have been historically excluded.

==== Hostile Resistance ====
In Kenya, feminism is often met with hostility both in physical and digital spaces. Women's rights activists in Kenya are often targets of violent threats and hateful speech.

=== South African Feminist Movements ===
A map of South Africa and its regions.

Main page at: Feminism in South Africa.

==== The Difference Debate ====
In South Africa, feminism has always been related to issues of race. This trend has been analyzed and called to attention in the "difference debate," which refers to interactions between black and white gender activists. Historically, the voices of white women have dominated the South African feminist discourse, marginalizing black voices. This was particularly noted as a concern by black feminists in attendance at the Women and Gender in Southern Africa Conference held in January 1991. The difference debate disrupted the white feminist ideology which dominated the 1990s: non-racialism, which overlooks the role of race. This framework posits that since men and women have such different experiences, gender, not race, must be the category which organizes society and activism. The difference debate brought into focus questions regarding not only race, but also socioeconomic class, ethnicity, and sexual orientation. The difference debate framework acknowledges that South African women are "simultaneously classed, raced, and gendered." Today, this perspective is often referred to in international contexts as the Triple oppression model. In recent years, post-structuralist theoretical frameworks tend to dominate the South African feminist discourse, leaving room for multiple identity standpoints and subjectivity. Even still, South African feminism continues to witness and combat racism.

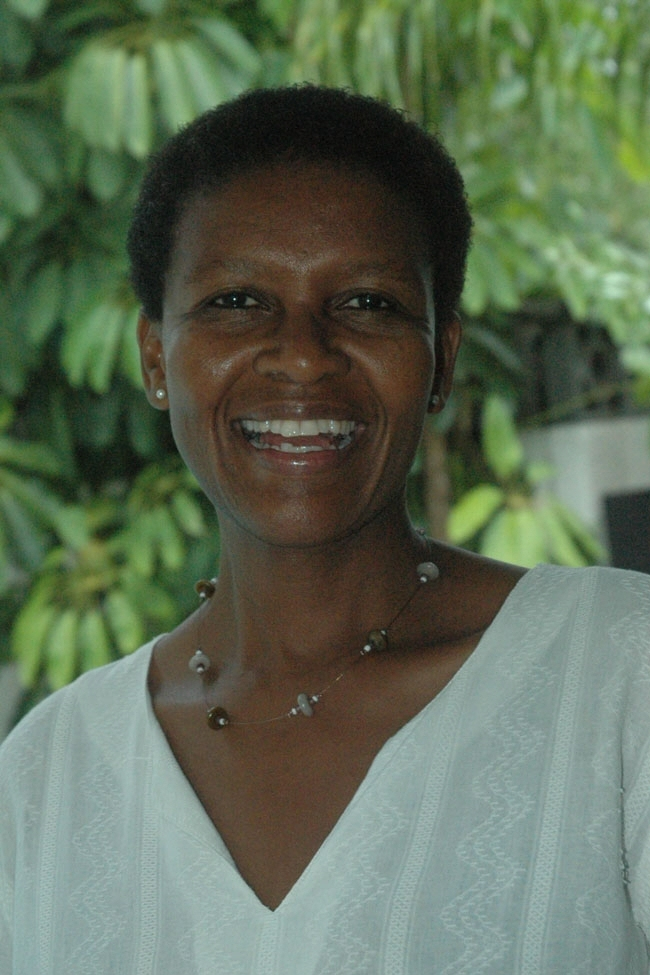
Alice Mogwe, 2010.

=== Botswanan Feminist Movements ===
Botswana provides yet another case in which Western feminism falls short within an African context. Regarding the tendency of Western feminism to universalize the experiences of all women, Botswanan scholar-activist Alice Mogwe writes: "Sisterhood may be global in some respects, but only if the differences are acknowledged as being essential to the experiences of women." Mogwe argues that the donor-aid economic development model which dominates Botswana and much of the Global South pushes women towards increasing marginalization. Within such a society, only paid labor is valued and exploitation is the norm. These trends, although particularly detrimental to Botswanan women, harm Black and Indigenous people of all genders. As a counterbalance, the Botswanan feminist agenda must prioritize general human rights, not just gender equity. For Mogwe, it is critical that Indigenous perspectives and colonial histories are taken into account in Botswanan feminism. By fulfilling these objectives, a Botswanan feminist theory can succeed where Western feminism continually fails.

=== Rwandan Feminist Movements ===
The Flag of Rwanda.

==== Overview ====
The history of Rwanda includes ethnic divisions, genocide, and patriarchal domination. Rwandan feminism has overcome each of these obstacles to become a powerful national movement. Rwandan feminism faces a practical challenge: how to unite the efforts of a small subset of the elite who consider themselves feminists and the vast majority of non-feminist elites and women at the grassroots level. Furthermore, there is the issue of reconciliation between Hutu and Tutsi women in the aftermath of a history fraught with violence. In the wake of the Rwandan genocide, women organized to provide services that would aid other Rwandan women, including cooperatives to assist survivors of sexual violence, refugees, orphans, and widows. These women sought to politically and economically empower women while rebuilding the nation. One such organization of Rwandan women is Pro-Femmes Twese Hamwe (Pro-Women All Together), which is composed to thirty-five different women's collectives. Generally, Rwandan feminism tends to be action-oriented. Rwandan feminism views power in relative terms; as constantly negotiated and re-negotiated. Various Rwandan feminist theories and movements often prioritize compromise, power-sharing, and inclusivity. Women play important roles in all aspects of political, economic, and social life in Rwanda.

==== Third Wave Feminism in Rwanda ====
In the late 1990s, many Rwandan women began to embrace third wave feminism. This feminist theory prioritizes identity and difference, with an emphasis on diversity and change. In Rwanda, third wave feminism is particularly associated with efforts to help widows and survivors of sexual violence that occurred during the Rwandan genocide. For instance, Avega Agahozo is one large women's organization dedicated to helping survivors.

==== Difference Feminism in Rwanda ====
Many women who have worked towards peace and healing in Rwanda have embraced certain elements of difference feminism. Difference feminism acknowledges that there are ontological differences between men and women, but stresses the equality of the sexes. In accordance with the paradigm of difference feminist theory, many Rwandan women have organized their activism to prioritized perceived female strengths like caretaking, connection, and anti-violence.

== Prominent African feminists ==
Well-known African feminists include Frances Abigail Olufunmilayo Ransome-Kuti, Lady Kofoworola Aina Ademola, Chimamanda Ngozi Adichie, Mona Eltahawy, Nawal El Saadawi, Maria Sarungi, Fatma Karume, Meaza Ashenafi, Zara Kay, Stella Nyanzi, Pumla Dineo Gqola, Esther Kimani, Modupe Mary Kolawole, Oyeronke Oyewumi, Nkiru Uwachia Nzegwu, Ifi Amadiume, Chinyere Ukpokolo, Molara Ogundipe-Leslie, and Bolanle Awe.

== See also ==
- Women in the decolonisation of Africa
- Feminism in Senegal
