= Chioma =

- Gender: Female
- Language: Igbo

Origin
- Meaning: Good chi
- Region of origin: Southeast Nigeria

Chioma // is a common female given name and surname of Igbo origin. It means "good chi"

== Notable people with the name include ==
=== Given names ===
- Chioma Agomo (born 1951), Nigerian law professor
- Chioma Ajunwa (born 1970), Nigerian Olympic athlete
- Chioma Chukwuka (born 1980), Nigerian actress
- Chioma Igwe (born 1986), American football player
- Chioma Nnadi, British fashion editor
- Chioma Nnamaka (born 1985), Swedish basketball player
- Chioma Okoli, Nigerian actress
- Chioma Okoye (born 1983), Nigerian actress
- Chioma Omeruah, Nigerian actress
- Chioma Onyekwere (born 1994), American athlete
- Chioma Opara (born 1951), Nigerian writer
- Chioma Toplis (born 1972), Nigerian actress
- Chioma Ubogagu (born 1992), British football player
- Chioma Ude, Nigerian entertainment executive
- Chioma Udeaja (born 1984), Nigerian basketball player
- Chioma Umeala (born 1996), South African-Nigerian actress
- Chioma Wogu (born 1999), Nigerian football player
- Chioma Ifediora (born 1996), Belfast UK

== Surname ==
- Kingsley Chioma (born 1984), Nigerian football player
