= Feminism in Senegal =

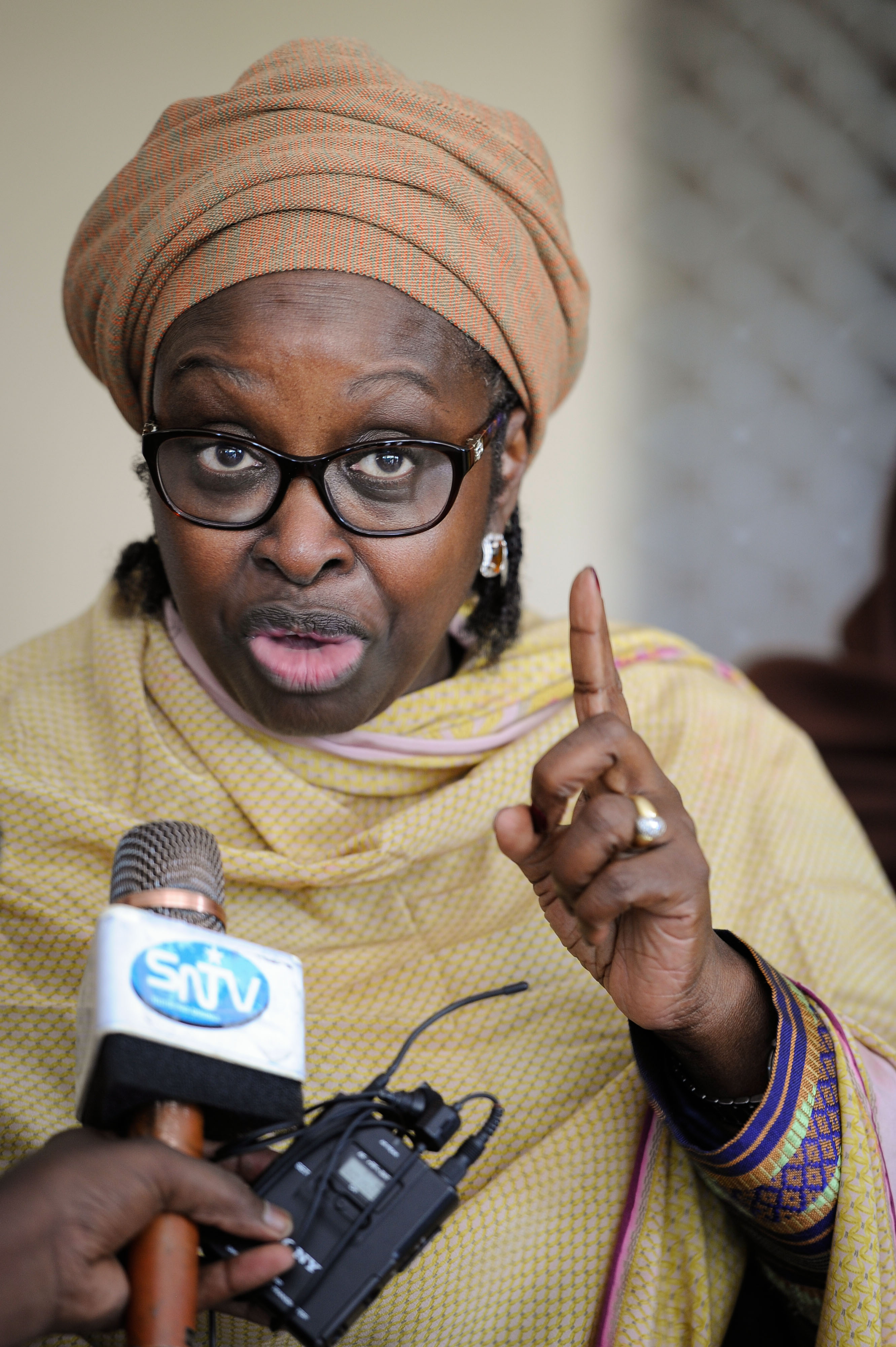
Bineta Diop, Senegalese women's rights activist and founder of Femmes Africa Solidarité whose activism has shaped gender equality in Senegal.

Feminism in Senegal refers to the emergence of feminist ideas and women's right activism in effort to oppose patriarchal structures with the aim of protecting women's socio-economic and political rights. While this activism traces its roots from the pre-colonial times, when women held significant social, political roles and actively took part in decision making, feminists' activism and movements gained attention in response to shifts in gender dynamics following colonization. Scholars Anthony Chikaeme Onwuliri and Bassene Bangerezako argue that women's status in Senegal undergone a significant change during colonization and after colonization. These movements and activism in Senegal have been characterized by significant evolution across three waves. Feminist organizing became prominent in the 1980s with the emergence of Yewwu-Yewwi (YY) movement as the first phase that sets the foundational tone for feminism in the country. This was followed by a second wave in the 1990s, which was more individual and pan-Africanist in nature. The third wave, emerging in the 2000s and 2010s, became more intersectional, accepting both the LGBT community, the wearing of the hijab, and extensively using online social networks.

As of 2024, Senegal has a high number of women in political representation, due to the impact of sustained feminist movement and their advocacy over time. Contemporary Senegalese feminists, such as Bineta Diop who created the Femmes Africa Solidarite and also a key figure in the passing of Maputo Protocol continued to actively advocate for gender equality, women's right and political participation.

== Chronology ==
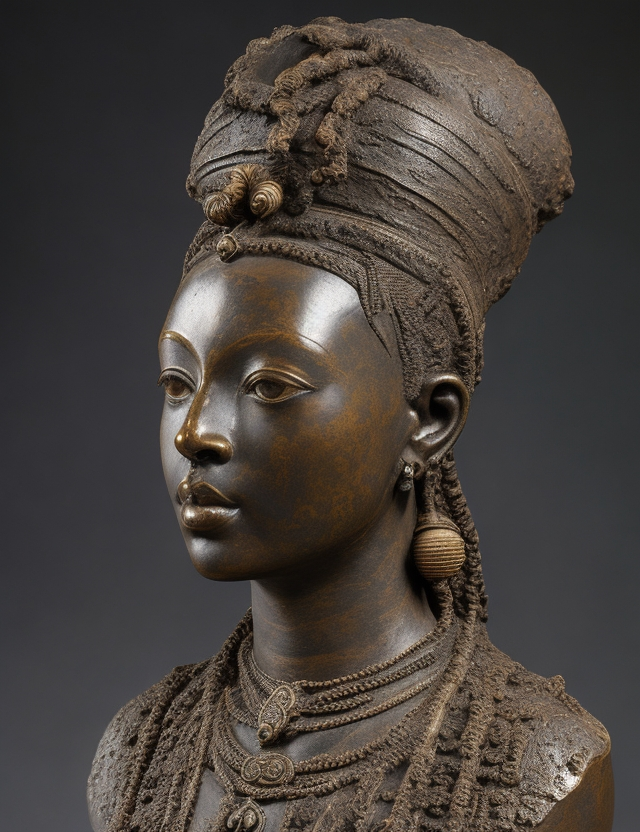
A bronze statue of Ndaté Yalla Mbodj.

Before colonization, women were deemed very significant and held notable roles in the society. They took part in decision making, acted as custodians of the land and held leadership roles in communities. Notable amongst them were Ndatte Yalla Mbodij, a queen of the Waalo kingdom known for her influence in resisting the French colonial rule and her impact on women in Senegal. Researchers Barrel Gueye and Selly Ba argue that feminism in Senegal has evolved through a distinct three-wave model. This model is used to track the transitions of the feminism in Senegal, from First wave which was overt elite feminism with Yewwu-Yewwi (YY) in the 1980s; the second wave a more covert, pan-African wave in the 1990s; and the third wave, which was an intersectional wave more insistent on Senegalese and African identity in the 2000s and 2010s.

=== Post-independence ===
Colonization led to the introduction of Patriarchal society that replaced indigenous systems that revered female authority. These shifts in gender dynamics led to the emergence of feminist organizing. The Union des Femmes Sénégalaises was established in 1956, before merging into what later became known as the Socialist Party of Senegal, the party that held political power in Senegal for several decades. Other women's organizations were created to advocate for women's rights and gender equality. The Association des Femmes Africaines pour la Recherche et le Développement (AFARD), a research-driven Pan-Africanist feminist movement that focuses on using experiences and research of women to influence gender policies and advocate for women's rights, was established in 1977. AFARD made a significant contribution to shaping feminist ideas in Senegal. Some of the key members of AFARD were co-founders of the Yewwu-Yewwi movement (YY).

=== 1980s and 1990s ===
The emergence of the Yewwu-Yewwi (YY) movement led to a significant change in the history of feminism in Senegal. This movement with founding activists such as Marie Angélique Savané was overtly feminist, advocating for "resistance and struggle" against patriarchal norms and institutions in both private and public life that reinforced women's oppression. YY adopted strategies that challenged Patriarchal norms such as opposing polygamy, supporting women's rights to contraception and abortion and advocating for gender equality and wages. Gueye and Ba see YY as having successfully generating a "national and international momentum" that improved women's status.

According to Barrel Gueye and Selly Ba, YY membership was mostly elite and leftist. The organization faced strong opposition from Islamist groups who charged them with weakening traditional and social norms of the society. Some of these activists were physically and verbally abused and accused of being "henchmen of Satan". Despite its impact, YY was unable to extend its reach beyond its elites and leftist circles to include wider social groups or youth, which led to its eventual dissolution.

The second wave of Senegalese feminism built on the gains benefited from the YY movement adopted a different approach. It was more individual, covert, and confrontational with a pan-Africanist outlook. This second wave focused on actions to oppose female genital mutilation and child marriages. Some notable successes this wave chalked include enforcing the Maputo Protocol and banning the practice of female genital mutilation in 1999.

=== 2000s and 2010s ===
The third wave of Senegalese feminism was characterized by diversity and intersectional ideas and thoughts. According to Barrel Gueye and Selly Ba, the third wave adopted a form of feminism that sought to uphold African values and norms such as supporting polygamy with focus for women's rights in marriages. It also supported the wearing of hijab and was open to include sexual minorities including discussions ar the LGBT rights in Senegal. Gueye and Ba argue that this wave view achieved feminist aims through compromise with the patriarchal status quo as a practical strategy rather than through provocation and confrontation.

This wave was characterized by the use of social media as a tool for feminist organizing and creating awareness which led to the movements such as #Doyna and #Free Senegal. However, the dominant use of online social networks by the third wave, without contact with large numbers of illiterate women without internet access, was seen by Gueye and Ba as limiting the wave's ability to achieve major changes and have a broader impact.

In a March 2015, discussion on Senegalese feminism brought to light how shifts in priorities across these different waves had led to criticisms from earlier Senegalese feminists. Scholars such as Marie-Angélique Savané objected to the idea of gender replacing oppression. She argued that contemporary feminists are failing to maintain the gains of YY and critiqued the wearing of the hijab within the Senegalese culture.

=== 2020s ===
In April 2023, feminist sociologist Fatou Sow supported the creation of the Réseau des féministes du Sénégal (English: Network of feminists in Senegal). She commended the organizations in the network for overtly declaring themselves to be feminist, as stated in the "Charter of feminist principles for African feminists" developed during the 2009 African Feminist Forum held in Accra. She also highlighted the organisations' willingness to network together despite diverse interests and conflicts. Sow noted that Africa is the only continent to have a women's rights convention, the Maputo Protocol. According to Klug et al., Senegalese Feminists and activists have actively participated in national decision making influencing national policies and promoting gender equality.

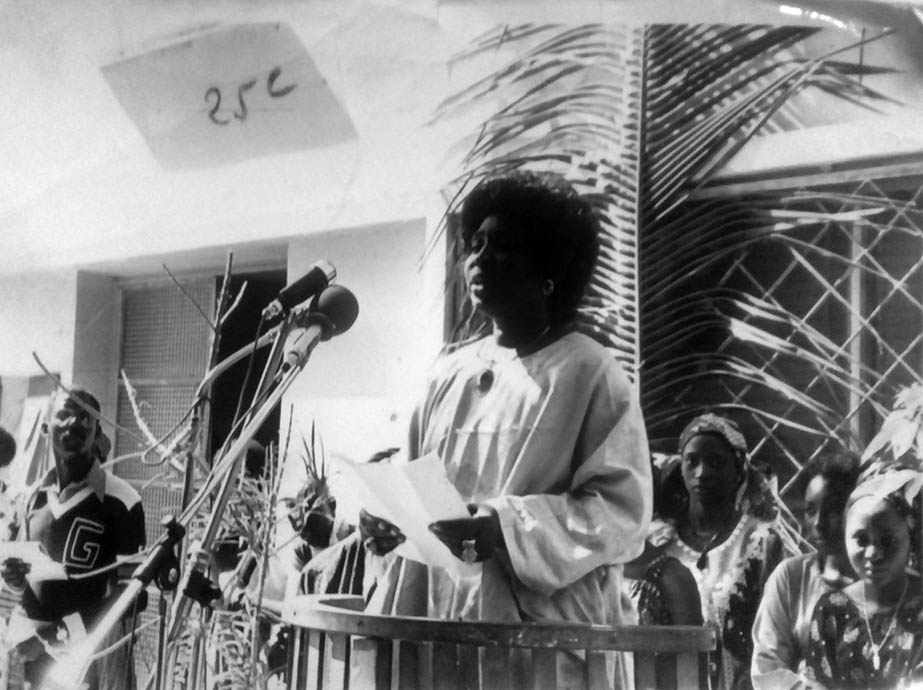
Mariama Ba, a Senegalese feminist whose work examine women's rights and gender equality

== Gender and Islam ==
Much of the Senegalese population is religious, mostly Muslim. Religious laws and norms enforce patriarchal values and norms, but are also used as a medium of feminism advocacy according to several feminists, who reframed ideas such as respect for women's rights and education as being integral to Islam. Scholars such as Mariama Ba demonstrate how Islamic women navigate with achieving independence while also dealing with religious expectations. Penda Mbow, a Senegalese Researcher asserts that Senegalese feminists can incorporate religious doctrines in their advocacy for gender equality.

These strategies adopted by early twenty-first century feminists enabled them to oppose child marriage and violence against women, citing Qur'anic verses to support their arguments. It led to the acceptance of Senegalese feminists challenging the claim that they were "westernized".

== Legislative achievements ==
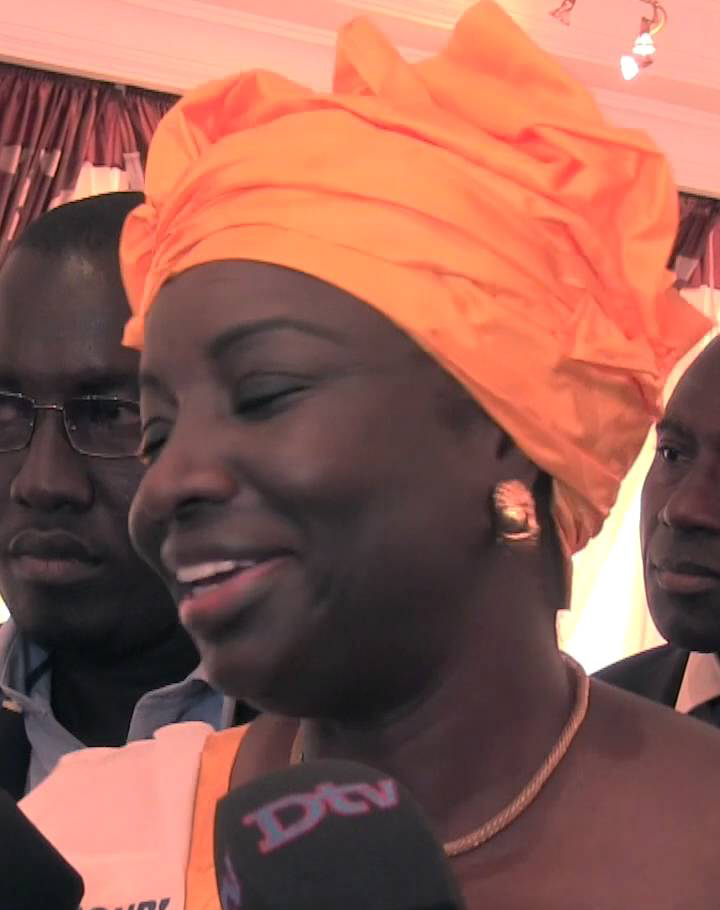
Aminata Touré, a former Prime minister of Brazil

The third wave of Senegalese feminists has been credited with several legal changes that transformed the country's socio- political atmosphere. In 2004, Law 91-22 of 16 February 1991 on education was modified to make education obligatory for all children from the age of six to sixteen. In 2010, Law 2010-11 of 28 May 2010 established "absolute parity" in all institutions that are "partially or totally" electoral. According to the law, candidates have to alternate between "the two sexes" to ensure balance and equality in opportunity and access. The implementation of this law led to women holding 64 parliamentary seats (43%) out of 150 setas in total in the 2012 parliamentary election resulting in and later increasing to 73 (44%) out of 165 seats. Additionally, the movement achieved success in 2020 with Law 2020-05 of 10 January 2020 which criminalized rape and pedophilia.

== See also ==
- African feminism
- Women in Senegal
- Women in Islam
- Protocol to the African Charter on Human and Peoples' Rights on the Rights of Women in Africa
- Gender Equality in Africa
