= Ivor Agyeman-Duah =

Ghanaian academic, writer and film director (born 1966)

- Born: 1966 (age 59–60); Kumasi, Ghana
- Education: SOAS University of London (MSc in Economic Development); University of Wales (MA); London School of Economics and Political Science (MSc in History of International Relations)
- Occupations: Academic and writer
- Awards: Order of the Volta (Officer Division)

Ivor Agyeman-Duah (born 1966) is a Ghanaian academic, economist, writer, editor and film director. He has worked in Ghana's diplomatic service and has served as an advisor on development policy.

== Biography ==
Ivor Agyeman-Duah was born in Kumasi, Ghana, in 1966, and was named after his father's friend, the British historian Ivor Wilks.

Agyeman-Duah holds an MA degree from the University of Wales, an MSc in Economic Development from the School of Oriental and African Studies (SOAS), University of London and an MSc in the History of International Relations from the London School of Economics and Political Science (LSE). He is the founder and Director of the Centre for Intellectual Renewal, a Public Policy organization in Ghana.

From 2009 to 2014, he was special advisor to President John Agyekum Kufuor on international development cooperation, and in this capacity worked with the World Food Programme in Kenya and Ethiopia and the Geneva-based international peacebuilding organization Interpeace. He has done work for the World Bank and World Bank Institute in Washington, DC. Agyeman-Duah was formerly head of Public Affairs at the Ghana Embassy in Washington, DC, and later Culture and Communication Advisor at the Ghana High Commission in London, and has been a consulting fellow of the African Center for Economic Transformation. He has also held fellowships at the W. E. B. Du Bois Institute for African and African American Research at Harvard University and been a Hilary and Trinity resident scholar at Exeter College, Oxford.

Also active in literary and cultural fields, Agyeman-Duah has written or edited many publications, including 2014's Crucible of the Ages: Essays in Honour of Wole Soyinka at 80, a book described as "a timely volume with majestic, priceless and supreme intellectual importance", featuring contributors including Ngugi wa Thiong'o, Nadine Gordimer, Margaret Busby, Toni Morrison, Ama Ata Aidoo, Henry Louis Gates, Jr., Kwame Anthony Appiah, Ali Mazrui, Derek Walcott, Atukwei Okai, Cameron Duodu, Toyin Falola, Osei Tutu II (king of Asante), John Mahama and Thabo Mbeki. Agyeman-Duah serves as Development Policy Advisor for the Lagos-based Lumina Foundation, which established the Wole Soyinka Prize for Literature in Africa, and he was the 2014–15 Chair of the Literature Jury of the Millennium Excellence Foundation.

He wrote, co-directed and produced two television documentary films – Yaa Asantewaa: The Exile of King Prempeh and the Heroism of an African Queen, premiered in Ghana in 2001, and The Return of a King to Seychelles, which was shown at Chatham House in 2015. Agyeman-Duah was also historical consultant to Margaret Busby's 2001 theatrical production about Yaa Asantewaa (Yaa Asantewaa – Warrior Queen).

=== Economic development and international cooperation ===
Currently, Agyeman-Duah is a Project Lead /Manager on one of ACET- Norwegian Agency for International Development Cooperation and World Bank's projects- the Strategic Partnership for Private Sector Development & Growth. He is also engaged in technical economic policy work on development in Rwanda, which country is the setting of his fictional story "The Good Ones". He has been a Centenary Research Associate in Development Studies at the School of Oriental and African Studies, London, and a Governing Member of the Ghana Museums and Monuments Board. Between 2017 and 2018, he served as a Strategic Development Policy Advisor for the Institute for Fiscal Studies in Accra, Ghana, on structural evaluations for fiscal policy advocacy.

From 2010 to 2012, he was Director of the Alliance for Africa Foundation based in Accra, an international non-governmental organization set up by the Milan City Council, Lombardy Regional Government and Expo 2015 of Italy that looked at education and infrastructure development, including feasibility of the redevelopment of the cocoa industry in Liberia.

He has worked on many international projects between 2005 and 2014 as a Member of a network that looked at the role of the African Diaspora in economic development at the World Bank Institute in Washington, DC, and part of a team for the Bank's capacity building for traditional authority project on heritage economics.

He was an advisor to the New York–based Andrew Mellon Foundation's Aluka cultural project and also co-established, through fund mobilization, a $500,000 bursary scheme at Exeter College of the University of Oxford for Ghanaian graduate scholars – the John Kufuor Fellowships. He has worked in Côte d'Ivoire for the Government and Novel Commodities as a consulting research team member and lead writer on production and marketing soft commodities: Constraints and Redevelopment of the Cocoa and Coffee Sectors in the Yamoussoukro District and Constraints and Redevelopment of Rice. In Ghana and Liberia, he was involved with the Washington, DC–based Partnership to Cut Hunger and Poverty in Africa and the Michigan State University.

As a development specialist, Agyeman-Duah has travelled and engaged in 25 African and Asian (especially southeast) countries on development policy work including a published report of the first decade policy implementation outcome of the Tokyo International Conference on Africa Development.

He was part of a team of scholars, policy makers and development specialists of the African Studies and Research Forum in Washington, DC, that was put together to assess US President George W. Bush's Africa foreign policy, subsequently published as Assessing George Bush's Africa’s Policy and Suggestions for Barack Obama (Bloomington, Indiana: i Universe, 2009) and Assessing Barack Obama’s Africa's policy (American University Press, 2011).

=== Cultural economy, Literary arts ===
For more than a decade, Agyeman-Duah has worked with the Nigerian Nobel laureate in Literature, Wole Soyinka on many projects including as associate director of the experimental Wole Soyinka Foundation with the University of Johannesburg in South Africa. Aspiring writers in the southern African region were mentored and Soyinka gave his series of lectures, Long Walk to Mandeland, as part of the programme. They also worked together on a series of public lectures delivered at the University of Oxford, at one of which Soyinka famously declared that he would tear his US Green Card into pieces should Donald Trump win the elections.

Together with Lucy Newlyn, a professor emeritus at St. Edmund Hall, Oxford, Agyeman-Duah was co-campaigner in Soyinka's electoral contest in the Oxford Professorship of Poetry appointment. Though they failed notwithstanding support from global icons such as former Archbishop of Canterbury Rowan Williams, former Director of Liberty, Baroness Chakrabari, of Kennington, the Poet Laureate of US, Rita Dove, the Booker Prize laureate Ben Okri OBE, and the British-Jamaican poet Benjamin Zephaniah, their campaign strategies and concerns were published as May Their Shadows Never Shrink – Wole Soyinka and the Oxford Professorship of Poetry. It partly analyses why the other black St. Lucian Nobel poet Derek Walcott withdrew from the same contest years earlier and implies that the post or appointment is more British, since Joseph Trapp an English poet and Anglican clergyman first won it in 1708, than international.

In 2017, he was co-convenor (with SOAS) for the 55th anniversary of the Makerere Conference of African Writers in Uganda, the historic congregation in 1962 of post-colonial literary giants who, as described by Kenyan novelist Ngugi wa Thiong'o, were "united by a vision of the possibilities of a different future for Africa."

Agyeman-Duah was the inaugural curator of The John A Kufuor Museum and Presidential Library and part of the team that negotiated its infrastructural development at the Kwame Nkrumah University of Science and Technology in Kumasi and at the University of Ghana, Legon. As well as being in the policy and scholarship spheres, Agyeman-Duah also had a distinguished career in theatre arts and journalism. He wrote for the London-based Panos Institute, the magazines West Africa and New African, and was editor of Some African Voices of Our Time (2002), an anthology of conversations with African writers.

As a documentary film producer, and besides appearing on several BBC, VOA and other international programmes as an African development specialist and analyst, Agyeman-Duah was a member of the production team for the BBC and PBS TV documentaries - Into Africa and Wonders of the African World, presented by leading African-American scholar Henry Louis Gates Jr. Agyeman-Duah initiated the agreement and final production engagement for the Discovery Channel on Ghana: Presidential Tour. He was production Advisor to Moving Vision TV, Wales, for The Kingdom of Ashanti and produced Yaa Asantewaa: The Heroism of an African Queen. An advisor to the King of Asante, Otumfuo Nana Osei Tutu II, on his visit to the Seychelles Islands, Agyeman-Duah followed up with The Return of a King to Seychelles.

Agyeman-Duah worked with Adzido Pan African Dance Ensemble on an Arts Council of England-funded ($2-million) year-long international mobile theatrical performance (in the West Yorkshire Playhouse in Leeds, Manchester Opera House, Alexander Theatre, Birmingham, and Edinburgh Festival Theatre, as well as Accra and Kumasi) of Yaa Asantewaa: Warrior Queen. This 50-person production was directed by the creator and artistic director of Carnival Messiah, Geraldine Connor.

In 2008, Agyeman-Duah was awarded the national honour of the Order of the Volta.

In 2014, he was executive producer of two Soyinka stage plays, Ake: The Years of Childhood and Childe Internationale. Agyeman-Duah was also co-curator in 2004 (with art historian Kwaku Fosu Ansa and Myrtis Beddla) in Washington, DC, of the exhibition Ancient Traditions and Contemporary Forms. He previously served on the international board of the Pan-African Historical Theatre Project (Panafest).

== Selected guest, Public lectures ==
- Globalisation and Africa’s Unfinished Agenda – Responding to Thandika Mkandawire, Macalester College, St. Paul's, Minnesota, US, 1998.
- Africa in a Renaissance Mood – Ghana in the Early Years of the C21st, All-University Lecture, California State University, Pomona, 2004.
- Pan-Africanism Caribbean Connections, Santo Domingo, Dominican Republic, 2005.
- Travelling Abroad but Having Home in Mind – Culture, the Arts and National Identity, Fifty Years of Ghana’s Independence, University of Ghana, Legon, 2007.
- Beyond the Miracle of the Han River-Some Pro-Growth Philosophy in Korea’s Rural Development and Africa’s Search for Agricultural Stimulation, Seoul, Korea, Korea Institute for International Economic Policy, 2011.
- Choices in a World of Strangers, Guest Speaker, The Great Hall, University of Ghana's Congregation – The College of Humanities, 2018.
- Asante: Sustaining a Heritage and a Cultural Economy, 1st Opemso Lecture of the Asante Professionals Club, Kumasi, March 2019.

== Publications ==
- Between Faith & History: A Biography of J. A. Kufuor (three volumes), Ayebia Clarke Publishing Ltd, January 2007. ISBN 978-0954702397.
- Pilgrims of the Night: Development Challenges and Opportunities in Africa, 2011.
- Africa a Miner's Canary Into the C21st: Essays on Economic Governance, foreword by Toyin Falola, 2013.
- Telephone Conversations: A History of Telecommunications Economics and MTN in Ghana, 2020.

=== As editor ===
- The Asante Monarchy in Exile: Sojourn of King Prempeh I and Nana Yaa Asantewaa in Seychelles, 2000.
- Kyerematen and Culture – The Kyerematen Memorial Lectures, 2001.
- (With Peggy Appiah) Bu Me Be: Proverbs of the Akans, Introduction by Kwame Anthony Appiah, 2006.
- An Economic History of Ghana: Reflections on a Half-Century of Challenges & Progress, Foreword by Wole Soyinka, 2008. ISBN 978-0955507984.
- (With Ogochukwu Promise) Crucible of the Ages: Essays in Honour of Wole Soyinka at 80, 2014.
- All The Good Things Around Us: An Anthology of African Short Stories, 2016. ISBN 978-0992843663
- (With Lucy Newlyn) May Their Souls Never Shrink: Wole Soyinka and the Oxford Professorship of Poetry, 2016. ISBN 978-0992843670
- The Gods Who Send Us Gifts: An Anthology of African Short Stories, Forewords by Wole Soyinka and Valerie Amos, 2017.
- Death of An Empire- Kwame Nkrumah in Ghana and Africa – KSP Jantuah, 2017. ISBN 978-9988871468
- (With Bill Buenar Puplampu) Africa in Search of Prosperity: Ishmael E. Yamson’s Essays on Development, Economics, Business, Finance and Economic Growth, 2017.
- Between the Generations: An Anthology for Ama Ata Aidoo at 80, 2020.

=== Book chapters, journal essays and reviews ===
- "Yaa Asantewaa"; "Seychelles Islands", and "George Padmore", in Carole Boyce-Davies (ed.), The Encyclopedia of the African Diaspora, ABS-CLIO, Inc. Santa Barbara/Oxford, England, 2004.
- "Themes in West African History. Edited by Emmanuel Akeampong, James Currey, England. 2005." Reviewed in African and Asian Studies Journal, Vol. 5, Nos 2–3 (Brill, Leiden).
- "Female Circumcision and the Politics of Knowledge – African Women in Imperialist Discourses. Edited by Obioma Nnaemeka, Prager Publisher, Connecticut. 2006". African and Asian Studies, Vol. 5, Nos 3–4.
- America Behind the Color Line: Dialogue with Africans Americans. Henry Louis Gates, Jr. Warner Books, USA. African and Asian Studies Journal, Vol. 5, Nos 3–4.
- "Chieftaincy in Ghana – Culture, Governance and Development. Edited by Irene K. Odotei and Albert K. Awedoba, Accra: Sub-Saharan Publishers, 2006". African Affairs (Royal African Society, London), 106 (425), 730–731.
- "Peace Without Power: Ghana’s Foreign Policy 1957 – 1966. Kwesi Armah, Ghana Universities Press, Accra, 2004." International Affairs, Journal of The Royal Institute of International Affairs, Chatham House, London, 2007.
- "You Must Set Forth at Dawn – A Memoir. Wole Soyinka. Methuen, London; 2006". International Affairs, Chatham House, 2007, London.
- "The African Diaspora – African Origins and New World Identities. Edited by Isidore Okpewho, Carole Boyce Davies and Ali A. Mazrui. Indiana University Press, Indiana. 2001". African and Asian Studies Journal (September 2007), Brill, Leiden.
- "East Asian Visions – Perspectives on Economic Development. Edited by Indermit Gill, Yukon Huang and Homi Kharas, World Bank, Washington, DC, 2007." Reviewed in International Affairs. Chatham House, London.
- "Japan Rising – The Resurgence of Japanese Power and Purpose, Kenneth B. Pyle, Perseus Books, US." African and Asian Studies Journal, 2008.
- "The Diaspora – Those Who Were Exiled from their Land". Asia–Africa Literature Journal, Jeonju, South Korea, 2008.
- "Dambisa Moyo and the Aid Architecture", The New Legon Observer, Vol. 3, No. 11, September 2009.
- "Conversations of Fathers and Daughters" (review of Fathers and Daughters- An Anthology of Exploration, edited by Ato Quayson, 2009), Transition, Indiana University Press, 2009.
- Culture, Communication and Socio-economic Development in Post-Colonial Ghana, in An Interdisciplinary Primer in African Studies, edited by Ishmael. I. Munene, Lexington Books, UK, 2011.
- "Chinua Achebe's Gift to Humanity: A Useable Past", Africa Watch, New York, 2013.
- "Albert Rene and The Modern History of Seychelles", Africa Today, Indiana University Press, 2015.
- "Kofi Awoonor's The Promise of Hope", Africa Today, Indiana University Press, 2015.
- "Seychelles Islands", in Toyin Falola and Jean-Jacques (eds), Africa- An Encyclopedia of Culture and Society, ABS-CLIO, California, US, 2016.
- Malcolm X, Pan Africanism and Today's Blacks, Malcolm X and Africa by A. B. Assensoh and Yvette M. Alex-Assensoh, Cambria Press, UK, 2016.

== Awards, fellowships, grants and board membership ==
- Resident Fellow, Thomson Foundation Commonwealth Award, University of Wales. UK, 1994.
- Asanteman Council award as chair of the local and international media committee on the 300-year anniversary of the founding of the West African Kingdom, 1996.
- Visiting Writer and Researcher travelling within the US as a Fellow of the World Press Institute, Macalester College, St. Paul, Minnesota, United States.
- International Visiting Fellowship of the US State Department, US, 1996.
- Nzema Association of North America, Courage in Leadership for Outstanding Service to the Association, 2003.
- Travel grant by the International Television Service of the US for the International Film Festival, San Francisco, California, 2003.
- Phi Beta Delta International Scholar, awarded by the College of Arts and Letters, Pomona, 2003.
- Resident Visiting Scholar, College of Arts and Letters, California State University, Pomona, 2003.
- Distinguished Leadership and Scholarship Award of the Association of Third World Studies, US, 2004.
- Order of the Volta, Officer Division, Republic of Ghana, 2008.
- Literary grant for Asia-Africa Literence Conference in Jeonju, North Province of Korea, 2008.
- Resident Fellow, Centre for Regional Economic Studies, Korea Institute for International Economic Policy, Seoul, Korea, 2010.
- Distinguished Friend of Oxford, University of Oxford, 2012.
- Chair of the Jury, Millennium Excellence Foundation – Literature Category, 2015.
- Member of the International Advisory Board, African Studies Centre, University of Oxford, 2018.
- MTN Foundation Grant for Literature, 2020.
