= Beatrice Duodu Owusu =

Spanish journalist

- Born: Beatrice; December 13, 1996 (age 29); Ghana
- Citizenship: Spanish
- Education: Journalism from the Autonomous University of Barcelona
- Occupation: journalism

Beatrice Duodu Owusu (born 13 December 1996) is a Ghanaian-born Catalan journalist and television presenter specializing in social journalism. Her work focuses on anti-racism and the representation of Black people, particularly women, in the media.

== Early life and education ==
Duodu Owusu was born in Ghana on December 13, 1996 and moved to Spain at the age of four but did not obtain Spanish citizenship until 2020. She currently lives in Vic, Catalonia.

She graduated with honours in Journalism from the Autonomous University of Barcelona in 2018. Her undergraduate dissertation, titled On són les dones negres? Feminisme africà i la representació de les dones africanes a la premsa catalana (Where Are the Black Women? African Feminism and the Representation of African Women in the Catalan Press), received recognition as one of the outstanding academic projects addressing gender perspectives.

The dissertation examined African feminism, the underrepresentation of Black women in Catalan newspapers, and the ways in which they are portrayed when featured in the media.

== Career ==
Duodu Owusu began gaining media experience through her involvement in the television programme Planta Baixa in 2019. She subsequently worked in various journalistic roles, including reporter, broadcaster and editor, for media organisations such as RAC1 and Radiotelevisión Española (RTVE). She also contributed to the magazine of the College of Journalists of Catalonia and the newspaper El 9 Nou.

Her other professional collaborations have included Media.cat and Teatre Barcelona.

On 3 October 2022, Duodu Owusu became the first Black woman to present a programme on TV3, Catalonia's public television broadcaster. She presented the overnight news bulletin on the channel 3/24. Her achievement was followed shortly afterwards by Maria Bouabdellah's appointment at SX3.

Beyond journalism and television presenting, Duodu Owusu is involved in anti-racism advocacy. She has also served as a moderator and speaker at events addressing related social issues.

In 2024, she participated in a discussion at the Literal Book Fair alongside American activist and scholar Angela Davis and philosopher Jule Goikoetxea.
