= Omolara =

- Gender: Female
- Language: Yoruba

Origin
- Origin: Nigeria
- Meaning: The child is kin
- Region of origin: South-west Nigeria

Other names
- Variant forms: Molara, Lara

Omolara is a female Nigerian name of Yoruba origins which translates to "the child is kin". The name also expands in Yoruba belief to mean that "one's child is the most reliable kin". Lara and Molara are diminutives of the name. It is predominantly given by Southwest Nigeria and Kwara state, which is part of the North Central geopolitical zone of Nigeria.

== Notable people with the name ==
- Omolara Ogundipe-Leslie, Nigerian writer
- Omolara Ogunmakinju, Nigerian sprinter
- Tiwa Savage (Tiwatope Omolara Savage), Nigerian Singer
