= Yewwu-Yewwi =

Yewwu-Yewwi is a Senegalese feminist organization, "the first feminist movement in Senegal". Liberal feminist in orientation, the group is led by educated Muslim Senegalese women. The name Yewwu-Yewwi is taken from a Wolof phrase meaning "raise consciousness for liberation".

== History ==
Yewwu-Yewwi was founded at a meeting on January 7, 1984 at the Chamber of Commerce in Dakar. Many members of Yewwu-Yewwi had been members of And-Jëf. Founders included Marie-Angélique Savané, who played an important role in the organization's leadership.

Activities of Yewwu-Yewwi have included awareness-raising, mobilization, lobbying, publishing and fund-raising. It collaborated with other African women's associations. It awarded a public prize, the Aline Sitoe Diatta prize, to the president of Burkina Faso, Thomas Sankara, as a means of pressuring the Senegalese executive to prioritize attention to the status of women.

Though never a popular organization with a broad base, Yewwu-Yewwi succeeded in influencing family law code reform in the late 1980s. Its emphasis on gender equality, violence against women and female circumcision helped set an agenda for later women's organizations in Senegal.
