= Guéoul =

- Commune and town
- Location within Senegal
- Coordinates: 15°29′N 16°21′W
- Country: Senegal
- Region: Louga Region
- Department: Kébémer Department

Area
  - Commune and town: 4.127 km^{2} (1.593 sq mi)

Population (2023 census)
  - Commune and town: 10,547
  - Density: 2,556/km^{2} (6,619/sq mi)
- Time zone: UTC+0 (GMT)

Guéoul is a town and urban commune in the Louga Region of Senegal.

The population in 2023 was 10,547, an increase from the 8,004 counted in 2013

The section of the railway line Dakar-Saint-Louis and Louga between Guéoul (20 km) was opened for operation on 1 January 1885, followed by the section between Guéoul and Kébémer (17 km) in March of the same year.

Binet Diop, a women's rights activist, was born in Guéoul.
