= Faithless Hijabi =

International non-profit organisation

- Founded: 2018
- Purpose: Women's right and support to ex-muslims
- Location: Sydney, Australia
- Region served: Worldwide
- Key people: Zara Kay
- Website: faithlesshijabi.org/

Faithless Hijabi is an association founded by Zara Kay in 2018 in Sydney, Australia. Faithless Hijabi is a storytelling platform that enables ex-Muslim and questioning Muslim women to share their stories of apostasy, doubt and freedom while also providing support to women ostracised or abused for leaving Islam.

Kay has stated that the organisation's name is "meant to be controversial."

== Work ==
Faithless Hijabi provides a platform for women to express their dissent, and strives to take an active role in advocating for women's rights. Faithless Hijabi is active on numerous social media in order to enable people to reach out for help. The organisation primarily publishes stories and blogs in English, but has also launched Arabic social media pages. FH's mission is "Educate through stories," and "to empower an underrepresented group of women."

The organisation worked with Rahaf Mohammed, a Saudi woman granted asylum in Canada.

In 2020, the organisation launched an online mental health programme.

== Bibliography ==
- Kay, Z. (2021). "The faithless Hijabi: Helping ex Muslim women be seen, heard, safe and free". The Australian Humanist (142): 25–27.
