= Molara Ogundipe =

Nigerian writer (1940–2019)

- Born: Abiodun Omolara Ogundipe; 27 December 1940; Lagos, Nigeria
- Died: 18 June 2019 (aged 78); Ijebu-Igbo, Ogun State, Nigeria
- Other names: Omolara Ogundipe-Leslie; Omolara Leslie
- Education: Queen's School, Ede; University College Ibadan (BA); Leiden University
- Occupations: Poet, critic, editor, feminist, activist

Molara Ogundipe (27 December 1940 – 18 June 2019), also known as Omolara Ogundipe-Leslie and Omolara Leslie, was a Nigerian poet, critic, editor, feminist, and activist. Her work focused on African feminism, gender studies and literary theory, she was a social critic who coined the term STIWA to refer to Social Transformation Including Women in Africa. Stiwanism became a strand within the larger feminist movement in Africa.

== Life ==
Abiodun Omolara Ogundipe was born in Lagos to a family of educators and clergy. Her mother taught English and math at a teachers' college. Her father was an educator and missionary who followed the teachings of Emanuel Swedenborg, and raised his family as Swedenborgians. She attended Swedenborg Memorial School for her primary school education. The school had a radical curriculum that included African history and compulsory education in the local language until the fourth year of primary school. She attended Queen's School, Ede, and went on to become the first woman to obtain a first-class BA Honours degree in English at University College Ibadan, then at the University of London. She later earned a doctorate in Narratology (the theory of narrative) from Leiden University.

She went on to teach English Studies, Writing, Comparative Literature, and Gender. She was also a Professor of English and Comparative Literature at the University of Port Harcourt, Rivers State, and the first head of the Department of English at the then Ogun State University (now Olabisi Onabanjo University) for several years.

Her husband's surname was Leslie. He was a Jamaican-born scholar and mathematician who hailed from a Garveyite family; they later divorced. Ogundipe later dropped her husband's surname, saying, "Instead of saying Ogundipe Leslie and spelling it correctly, especially foreigners, they just call me Leslie. I didn’t want to be called Leslie because it is not my name." She died at the age of 78 at her home in Ijebu-Igbo, Ogun State, in June 2019. She was survived by two daughters.

== Writing ==
After graduating from the University of London in 1963, Molara Ogundipe played a leading role in African feminism. She wrote for numerous academic and general publications, and also published books of non-fiction as well as a collection of poetry. She contributed the piece "Not Spinning on the Axis of Maleness" to the 1984 anthology Sisterhood Is Global: The International Women's Movement Anthology, edited by Robin Morgan, and her poetry is included in the 1992 anthology Daughters of Africa, edited by Margaret Busby.

=== Views on gender ===
Molara Ogundipe's academic writing was described as being "at the forefront of the theoretical dynamism which is unfolding within African feminism". She studied pre-colonial Yoruba women's lives and objected to Western depictions of the African woman as subservient, unintelligent, and oppressed. She stated that Yoruba women during pre-colonial times had their own distinct forms of domestic power, saying in a 2002 interview with Desiree Lewis of the journal Feminist Africa, "I discovered that the Yoruba woman had more private and public spaces and respected roles than pre-feminist American middle-class women. They needed Betty Friedan; we already had the right to work outside the home and secure our material needs."

Over the years, she was a critic of patriarchal systems and argued that African women were more oppressed in their status and roles as wives than their European counterparts, even in identities where they enjoyed status, privilege, recognition, and agency. She criticized the plight of African women as due to the impact of imposed colonial and neo-colonial structures that often placed African males at the height of social stratification. The internalization of patriarchy by African women themselves also features in Ogundipe's work. She was recognized as one of the foremost writers on African women and feminism.

== Stiwanism ==
In her book Recreating Ourselves: African Women and Critical Transformations (1994), Ogundipe argued for an African-centred feminism that she termed STIWA (Social Transformation in Africa Including Women). It built on her earlier work critiquing Western-oriented feminist theories. STIWA formed a theoretical framework grounded the idea that women's traditional roles in Nigeria's social and political institutions could improve those institutions from within, rather than import what she saw as a foreign ideology. She explained that the acronym was meant "to move us away from defining feminism and feminisms in relation to Euro-America or elsewhere and from declaiming loyalties or disloyalties".

What came to be known as Stiwanism brought together her "intricate oeuvre" that aimed to engage African feminists in bringing meaningful changes in issues related to gender, family, and society that can drive national and continental development. This theory specifically focuses on Africa's socio-political and economic agency in advancing women's development. Ogundipe expressed that African feminist movements did not focus on distancing themselves from the male gender, but on coexisting and working harmoniously with it. In her 2002 interview, she uses a Yoruba proverb to translate this gender relationship. "If a man finds a snake and a woman kills it, it does not matter, as long as the snake is dead."

Stiwanism is concerned with seven principles: It resists Western feminism; gives specific attention to African women in the milieu of 1990s feminism; brings to the forefront indigenous feminism that has also existed in Africa; advocates women's inclusion and participation in the socio-political transformation of the African continent; contends with a woman's body, personhood, nationhood, and society and how it operates within socio-economic hierarchies; is intentionally specific to individual and collective identities (i.e. religion, class, and marital status); and recognizes that there are many factors and identities in Africa and individual personhoods operating in different and contradictory ways.

== Activism ==
Ogundipe was a leader in feminist activism for decades. She was a founding member of AAWORD (Association of African Women in Research and Development), founded in 1977. This association's focus was on nationalism, identity, and cultural awareness. She was also a founding member of WIN (Women In Nigeria), an association that analyzed Nigerian Women's oppression through the lens of socio-economic challenges. At its onset, WIN was one of the most successful associations in Nigeria. She gave keynote addresses, lectured, and represented the women of her associations in many seminars and conferences, including the UN World Conference on Women in Kenya in 1985. writing the foreword document that was presented at the conference. She was also the Founder and Director of the Foundation for International Education and Mentoring, which is dedicated to teaching young women the doctrine and virtues of feminist theories and gender equality.

In the 1990s, Ogundipe remained frustrated with the pace of achieving gender parity in academia. She criticized one of the leading African scholars, Professor Ali Mazrui, for sexism and for marginalizing the significance of African women in Africa’s cultural transformation. She was also critical of the Nigerian government's women-funded programs, which she felt inhibited genuine women's mobilization and democracy because they perpetuated male-dominated leadership structures.

== Published works ==
=== Books ===
- Sew the Old Days and Other Poems, 1985
- Re-Creating Ourselves: African Women & Critical Transformations, 1994
- (ed.) Women as Oral Artists, 1994
- (ed. with Carole Boyce-Davies) Moving Beyond Boundaries, April 1995 (two volumes).
- Gender and subjectivity. Readings of "Song of Lawino". Dissertation Leiden University. Leiden, CNWS, 1999
- Indigenous and Contemporary Gender Concepts and Issues in Africa: Implications for Nigeria’s development. Lagos, Benin, Ibadan, Jos, Oxford, Zaria: Malthouse Limited P., 2005.

=== Selected shorter writings ===
- Ogundipe-Leslie, Molara. "Beyond Hearsay and Academic Journalism: The Black Woman and Ali Mazrui". Research in African Literatures, vol. 24, no. 1, 1993, pp. 105–112.
- Ogundipe-Leslie, Molara, and Carole Boyce Davies. "Introduction". Research in African Literatures, vol. 25, no. 3, 1994, pp. 1–6.
