= Carole Boyce Davies =

Professor of Africana Studies and English

- Born: Trinidad and Tobago
- Education: University of Maryland Eastern Shore (B.A.); Howard University (M.A.); University of Ibadan (Ph.D)
- Occupations: Professor, author
- Organizations: Cornell University
- Notable work: Black Women, Writing and Identity (1994); Left of Karl Marx: The Political Life of Claudia Jones (2008)
- Website: caroleboycedavies.com

Carole Boyce Davies is a Caribbean-American professor of Africana Studies and English at Cornell University, the author of the prize-winning Left of Karl Marx: The Political Life of Claudia Jones (2008) and Black Women, Writing and Identity: Migrations of the Subject (1994), as well as editor of several critical anthologies in African and Caribbean literature. She is currently the Frank H. T. Rhodes Professor of Humane Letters, an endowed chair named after the ninth president of Cornell University. Among several other awards, she was the recipient of two major awards, both in 2017: the Frantz Fanon Lifetime Achievement Award from the Caribbean Philosophical Association and the Distinguished Africanist Award from the New York State African Studies Association.

Boyce Davies has held distinguished professorships at a number of universities including the Herskovits Professor of African Studies at Northwestern University (2000) and was appointed to the Kwame Nkrumah Professor at the University of Ghana, Legon (2015). She is the author or editor of thirteen books, including the three-volume Encyclopedia of the African Diaspora, and more than a hundred journal articles and encyclopedia entries.

She serves on the International Scientific Committee of UNESCO General History of Africa, Volume Nine, as coordinator/editor of the epistemological forum on Global Blackness of the forthcoming volume on the African diaspora and is the Vice Chairperson of the African Humanities Forum (based in Mali). She has lectured on Black women's writings and experience, Black Left Feminism, and African Diaspora issues across North America, Africa, Europe, and the Caribbean, and in Brazil, Europe, Africa, the Caribbean, Australia, India, and China. She has held visiting professorships at several universities, including Beijing Foreign Studies University, China, and has been a Fulbright Professor at the University of Brasília, Brazil and the University of the West Indies at St Augustine, Trinidad and Tobago.

As Director of African New World Studies at Florida International University, Boyce Davies developed the Florida Africana Studies Consortium and served on the Florida Commissioner of Education's Task Force for Implementing the Florida Mandate for the Teaching of African American Experience. She has been president of major academic organizations such as the African Literature Association and the Caribbean Studies Association.

== Background ==
Born in Trinidad and Tobago, Boyce Davies studied at the University of Maryland Eastern Shore (B.A. in English) and Howard University (M.A. in African Studies) and received her Ph.D. in African Literature at the University of Ibadan on Commonwealth Scholarship from the government of Trinidad and Tobago. From the mid-1980s and throughout the 1990s, she was a professor at the State University of New York, Binghamton. In 1997, she was recruited to build the African Diaspora Studies Program at Florida International University, serving three successful terms there until 2007, when she joined the Cornell University faculty.

== Scholarship ==
=== International dimensions of Black women's writing ===
Boyce Davies is a leading authority on Black women writing cross-culturally. Her book Black Women Writing and Identity: Migrations of the Subject (Routledge, 1994) is a study of Black women's writing, broadening the discourse surrounding the representation of and by Black women and women of colour. It explores a complex set of interrelated issues, establishing the significance of such wide-ranging subjects as: re-mapping, renaming and cultural crossings; gender, heritage and identity; African women's writing and resistance to domination; marginality, effacement and decentering; gender, language and the politics of location.

She also edited Volumes One and Two of Moving Beyond Boundaries: International Dimensions of Black Women's Writing (with Molara Ogundipe-Leslie) and Black Women's Diasporas, a major contribution to our understanding of the issues, experiences, and concerns of Black women writing in different communities and in a wide range of geographic contexts. Covering writers from Africa, Brazil, Latin America, the Caribbean, and Europe, and such well-known authors as Zora Neale Hurston, Nadine Gordimer, and bell hooks, it contains both creative and critical writings, and by considering the area of critical writing as critical conversation, it allows writer and critic to speak with each other in the creation of the critical voice.

=== Recovering Claudia Jones ===
Trinidad-born intellectual-activist Claudia Jones (1915–1964) had long remained outside of academic consideration before Boyce Davies restored her to global, intellectual prominence. In Left of Karl Marx: The Political Life of Black Communist Claudia Jones (Duke University Press, 2008), Boyce Davies assesses the activism, writing, and legacy of Claudia Jones, a pioneering Afro-Caribbean radical intellectual, dedicated communist, and feminist. Jones is buried in London's Highgate Cemetery, to the left of Karl Marx — a location that Boyce Davies finds fitting, given how Jones expanded Marxism-Leninism to incorporate gender and race in her political critique and activism. In 2008, the book was awarded the Letitia Woods Brown Book Award, given annually by the Association of Black Women Historians.

Boyce Davies is also the editor of Claudia Jones: Beyond Containment (Ayebia Clarke Publishing, 2011), which brings together for the first time the essays, poetry, and autobiographical and other writings of Claudia Jones.

=== Caribbean women writers ===
Boyce Davies has also established herself as a major scholar of Caribbean women writers. Along with Elaine Savory Fido, she coedited Out of the Kumbla: Caribbean Women and Literature, the first collection of critical essays on Caribbean women’s literature. The book not only created a field of literary criticism which engaged the absence of women writers from the Caribbean literary canon as it established the presence of these writers historically. But by expanding the narrow terms of Western feminist discourse, it also revitalized Caribbean literature and criticism. Using the metaphor of the "Kumbla" or "calabash" used to protect precious objects, first used by writer Erna Brodber, coming “Out of the Kumbla” then signified a movement from confinement to visibility, articulation, and activism, a process which allowed for a multiplicity of moves, exteriorized, no longer contained and protected or dominated.

=== African Diaspora Studies/Decolonizing discourses ===
Boyce Davies served as the general editor of Encyclopedia of the African Diaspora: Origins, Experiences, and Culture (three-volume set), regarded as an authoritative source for information on the people, places, and events of the African Diaspora, spanning five continents and five centuries.

In collaboration with her former students Meredith Gadsby, Charles Peterson and Henrietta Williams, Boyce Davies edited Decolonizing the Academy: African Diaspora Studies that examines how higher education institutions operate as sites of knowledge production that often validate Eurocentric, colonial, and capitalist interests.

=== Caribbean Spaces ===
Both a memoir and a scholarly study, her book Caribbean Spaces: Escapes from Twilight Zones (University of Illinois Press, 2013) explores the multivalent meanings of Caribbean space and community in a cross-cultural and transdisciplinary perspective. Throughout, Boyce Davies demonstrates how Caribbean cultures circulate internationally and how a Caribbean perspective has linked her political vision to the Civil Rights Movement, the environmental catastrophes of Haiti, the failure of the New Orleans levies during Hurricane Katrina, and the use of modern technologies such as smartphones and global positioning systems within the Caribbean. Ultimately, Boyce Davies reestablishes the connections between theory and practice, intellectual work and activism, and personal and private space.

=== Black women and political leadership ===
Having previously published a number of essays on Black women and political leadership in the African diaspora – notably "Con-di-fi-cation: Black Women, Leadership and Political Power" (2007), "'She Wants the Black Man’s Post': Sexuality and Race in the Construction of Women's Leadership in Diaspora" (2011), "Writing Black Women into Political Leadership: Reflections, Trends and Contradictions" (2015), and "First Ladies/First Wives, First Women Presidents: Sexuality, Leadership and Power in the African Diaspora" (2018) – Boyce Davies in 2022 published her most recent book, Black Women’s Rights: Leadership and the Circularities of Power, which examines lessons to be drawn from the stories of Black women political leaders globally, including Shirley Chisholm, Winnie Madikizela-Mandela, and Marielle Franco.

== International education ==
Boyce Davies has decades of experience in international education. In the English Department at Binghamton University, SUNY, she served as the co-director of its London study abroad program. As a distinguished visiting professor, she taught Black women's Writing, transnationalism and diaspora, and academic writing at Beijing Jiaotong University, Beijing Foreign Studies University, University of Brasília, and the University of West Indies at St. Augustine. She has also organized and directed Teachers Institutes in New York, Miami, Florida and in the Caribbean—Grenada and Haiti, the latter in conjunction with the Caribbean Studies Association Conference in Haiti and courtesy of a grant from the Kellogg Foundation.

== Awards ==
In 2011, she was given an ICABA award as one of South Florida's most accomplished executives, professionals and Academicians. In 2008, her book Left of Karl Marx: The Political Life of Black Communist Claudia Jones (Duke University Press, 2008) won the Letitia Woods Brown Memorial Prize for the best book on African American Women's History from the Association for the Study of African American Life and History (ASALH).

Boyce Davies was the 2017 recipient of the Frantz Fanon Lifetime Achievement Award (Caribbean Philosophical Association) and the Distinguished Africanist Award (New York State African Studies Association).

Her research has been supported by grants and fellowships from the Kellogg Foundation, Greene Family Foundation, Smithsonian Institution, Ford Foundation, Florida International University, American Council of Learned Societies, and SUNY - Binghamton Foundation and Caribbean Airlines.

== Published works ==
=== Books ===
- (Editor, with Anne Adams Graves) Ngambika: Studies of Women in African Literature. Africa World Press, 1986, ISBN 978-0865430181.
- (Editor, with Elaine Savory Fido) Out of the Kumbla: Caribbean Women and Literature. Africa World Press, 1990, ISBN 978-0865430433.
- Black Women, Writing, and Identity: Migrations of the Subject. Routledge, 1994, ISBN 978-0415100878.
- (Editor, with Molara Ogundipe-Leslie) Moving Beyond Boundaries – Vol. 1: International Dimensions of Black Women's Writing; Vol. 2: Black Women's Diasporas, New York University Press, 1995
- (Editor, with Isidore Okpewho and Ali A. Mazrui) The African Diaspora: African Origins and New World Identities. Indiana University Press, 2001, ISBN 978-0253214942.
- (Editor, with Meredith Gadsby, Charles Peterson and Henrietta Williams) Decolonizing the Academy: African Diaspora Studies. Africa World Press, 2003, ISBN 978-1592210664.
- (Editor) Encyclopedia of the African Diaspora – 3 volumes. ABC-CLIO, 2008, ISBN 978-1851097005.
- Left of Karl Marx: The Political Life of Black Communist Claudia Jones. Duke University Press, 2008, ISBN 978-0822341161.
- (Editor) Claudia Jones: Beyond Containment. Ayebia Publishing Company, 2011, ISBN 978-0956240163.
- Caribbean Spaces: Escape Routes from Twilight Zones. University of Illinois Press, 2013, ISBN 978-0252079535.
- Black Women’s Rights: Leadership and the Circularities of Power, Lexington Books, 2022, ISBN 978-1793612380.

=== Selected shorter writings ===
- "Con-di-fi-cation: Black Women, Leadership and Political Power", Feminist Africa, March, 2007. Reprinted as "Con-di-fi-cation: Black Women, Leadership, and Political Power", in Still Brave: The Evolution of Black Women’s Studies, eds Stanlie James, Frances Smith Foster, and Beverly Guy-Sheftall (New York: Feminist Press, 2009): 392–414.
- "'She Wants the Black Man's Post': Sexuality and Race in the Construction of Women's Leadership in Diaspora", Agenda (South Africa) 25, no. 4 (2011): 121–133.
- "Twelve Years a Slave Fails to Represent Black Resistance to Enslavement", The Guardian, 10 January 2014.
- "Writing Black Women into Political Leadership: Reflections, Trends and Contradictions", in Black Women and International Law: Deliberate Interactions, Movements and Actions, ed. Jeremy Levitt (Cambridge, United Kingdom: Cambridge University Press, 2015): 23–34.
- "She didn't just play the race card – she actually lived it" (with Jeremy Levitt), Miami Herald, 15 June 2016.
- "First Ladies/First Wives, First Women Presidents: Sexuality, Leadership and Power in the African Diaspora", in Michelle Obama's Impact on African American Women and Girls, eds Paula Seniors, Michelle Duster, and Rose Thevenin (Palgrave Macmillan, 2018).
