= Ada Uzoamaka Azodo =

Literary scholar

Ada Uzoamaka Azodo (born 1947) is a literary scholar. She is Associate Faculty in the Humanities, and Adjunct Professor of African, African American and African Diaspora Studies at Indiana University Northwest.

== Life ==
Azodo gained a diplôme d'études supérieures (DES) from the University of Dakar, a BA from the University of Ife, and an MA and PhD from the University of Lagos.

Azodo has written on African literature, including the work of Camara Laye, Mariama Bâ, Aminata Sow Fall, Ken Bugul and Tsitsi Dangarembga, Chinua Achebe, Flora Nwapa and Buchi Emecheta. She is president of the Igbo Studies Association.

== Works ==
- L'imaginaire dans les romans de Camara Laye. New York: P. Lang, 1993, 1990
- (ed. with Gay Wilentz) Emerging perspectives on Ama Ata Aidoo. Trenton, NJ: Africa World Press, 1998
- (ed.) Emerging perspectives on Mariama Bâ : postcolonialism, feminism, and postmodernism. Trenton, NJ: Africa World Press, 2003.
- (ed. with Maureen Ngozi Eke) Gender and sexuality in African literature and film. Trenton, NJ: Africa World Press, 2006.
- (ed.) Emerging perspectives on Aminata Sow Fall : the real and the imaginary in her novels. Trenton, NJ: Africa World Press, 2007
- Emerging perspectives on Ken Bugul : from alternative choices to oppositional practices. Trenton, NJ: Africa World Press, 2008
- African Feminisms in the Global Arena: Novel Perspectives on Gender, Class, Ethnicity, and Race. Goldline & Jacobs Publishing, 2019.
- (ed. with Akachi Adimora-Ezeigbo) Resident Alien and Other Stories: An Anthology of Immigrant Voices from Africa and the African Diaspora. Goldline & Jacobs Publishing, 2020.
