= Chioma Opara =

Nigerian feminist

Chioma Carol Opara
- Born: 23 May 1951 (age 75); Jos, Nigeria
- Citizenship: Nigerian
- Occupations: Professor of Literature and Comparative Literature
- Known for: Patent Theories of Femalism and Gynandrism
- Spouse: Peter Amanze Opara

Academic work
- Era: Current
- Main interests: African Literature, African Feminism

Chioma Opara (born 23 May 1951 in Jos, Nigeria) is a Nigerian author and academic whose work primarily focuses on West African feminism. She is known for developing the theory of femalism and is recognised as one of the six most important African feminist theorists. Her work has been influential in study of gender in Africa.

She is currently a Professor of English and Comparative Literature in the Faculty of Humanities at Rivers State University in Port Harcout, Nigeria.

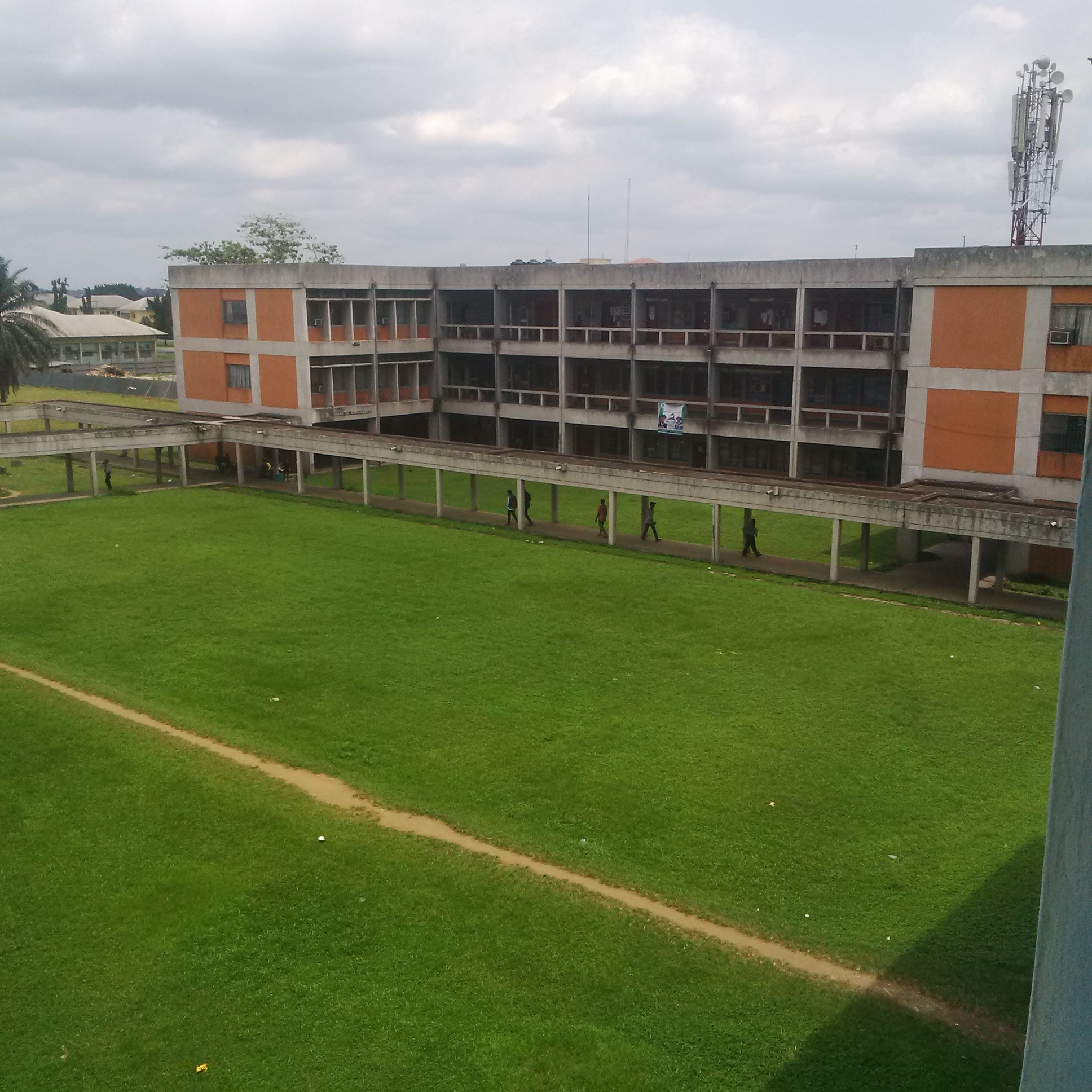
Rivers State University

== Education ==
Opara received her B.A in French from the University of Nigeria, Nsukka, and went on to earn her diploma in French Studies at The University of Dakar, as well as a certificate in French studies from the University of Tours in France. She obtained her Ph.D. in English at the University of Ibadan in Nigeria.

Opara has been an activist for humanities education in Nigeria. In a 2016 inaugural speech at Rivers State University, Opara stated that its Institute on Foundational Studies should be elevated to a full-fledged Faculty of Humanities. She argued that "the elevation of the institute to a Faculty of Humanities and Social Sciences would facilitate integrative possibilities. In a 2016 interview, she argued that the mastery of language, particularly the English language, is essential to bolster the academic prestige and achievement of higher education institutions in Nigeria: "students should take the dictionary as their second bible." At her university, Opara is dubbed "the English women" due to her expertise in the English language and literature.

== Theories ==
Opara's theoretical work focuses on innovating psychological and sociological feminist frameworks for African women and academics, particularly in analyzing literature. Opara centers the African female experience in the context of postcolonialism, globalization, economic disparity, and traditional African culture. She discusses how African women can subvert generations of sexism, entrenched in all of these systems in a specific context, and describes the appropriate tools for given contexts. Her work belongs to the school of burgeoning African feminist scholarship, which grew as a necessary response to the problem of white feminism and black feminism failing to address the experiences and perspectives of African women on the continent.

=== Femalism ===
Opara describes her theory of femalism as a tangible "praxis" that "foregrounds the body while applying psychoanalytical criticism in its negotiation of the gendered subjectivity deemed as culturally and socially constructed." In this theory, she describes the female body as a site of patriarchal abuse and violence on the African continent as the bearer of European colonialism and exploitation. In this way, she centers the female body, which she likens to Mother Nature, and draws a poignant link between the liberation of African women and African nations at large. She argues that:

applying the theory of femalism, a variant of African feminism, the female body as well as mothering will constitute the systemic site of discourse and hermeneutics. Parallels will be drawn between the lacerated female body and the mutilated African nation jostled by wars, poverty, disease, colonialism, and postcoloniality. Simply put, the feminized African country evokes Mother Earth, Woman Earth--an abstract projection of the African female body. The scarred body not only aligns with the spiritual in the representation of the natural and the cosmic but also manifests the dents of a scrambled and ailing nation. In the mothering of texts, we shall limn some African writers, transcending to embrace the Satrean concept of freedom. The existent may, however, in spinning the web of transcendence in a utopian precinct subordinate reproductive maternity to productive creative art.

In a lecture, Opara also described her theory:

By virtue of its analysis of living experiences focused on the body, femalism is as phenomenological as it is heuristic and composite. Drawing parallels between the politically scarred African nation and the socioculturally battered female body, femalism effects a nexus between the freedom of woman and that of the African continent. The female nurturing body is considered to be analogous to Mother Africa--an embodiment of Mother Nature. The Metropolitan manipulations of a jolted African nation in the course of its economic and historical trajectory are likened to the flagrant, patriarchal abuse of the female body and mind in the quest for a holistic existence.

==== Gynandrism ====
Opara defines her theory of gynandrism (a term she uses differently than others) as the male empathy for women found in African literature. She writes that it provides "African female subjects as well as female writers a robust leverage in the literary canon." Furthermore, she states that "the gynandrist's work proffers a site for implicitly or explicitly censuring sexist normative patterns on the one hand and extolling the merits of the female on the other."

== Works ==
- Beyond the Marginal Land (Belpot, 1999)
- English and Effective Communication (Pearl Publishers, 2000)
- Her Mother's Daughter (University of Port Harcourt Press, 2004)
- "Women's Perennial Quest in African Writing" in Dialogue and Universalism (2017)
- "Not a scintilla of light: Darkness and despondency in Yvonne Vera's Butterfly Burning" (2008)
- "New Perspectives on Women and Community Empowerment in Zaynab Alkali's The Descendants and The Initiates" (2011)
- "A Drama of Power: Aminata Sow Fall's The Beggars' Strike." in Twelve Best Books by African Women. (Athens : Ohio University Press, 2009
- "On the African Concept of Transcendence: Conflating Nature, Nurture and Creativity." International Journal of Philosophy and Religion 21(2): 189-200.
- "The Gynandrist : Elechi Amadi." Journal of Gender Studies 1, No. 2 (November 2000), pp. 121–141.
- "From Stereotype to Individuality: Womanhood in Chinua Achebe's Novels"
- "The foot as metaphor in female dreams: analysis of Zaynab Alkali's novels"
- "Making Hay on Sunny Grounds"
- "The emergence of the female self: The liberating pen in Mariama Ba's Une si longue lettre and Sembene Ousmane's Lettres de France"
