= Charter of Feminist Principles for African Feminists =

Charter of Feminist Principles for African Feminists is a document by the African Women's Development Fund that was formulated during a 2006 gathering of African women feminists across the world in Accra, Ghana, to create baseline principles to address key definitions of African feminism and patriarchy.
