= Chioma Agomo =

Nigerian academician

Chioma Kanu Agomo
- Born: March 1, 1951 (age 75); Nipa, Abia State
- Citizenship: Nigerian
- Known for: Gender and the Law, Law of Contract, Industrial Law, Insurance Law

Academic background
- Education: Queen Mary University of London

Chioma Kanu Agomo is a Nigerian professor of Law at the University of Lagos with specialisation in Law of contract, Industrial law, Insurance law and Gender and the Law.

== Early life and education ==
Chioma Agomo (née Offonry) was born on 1 March 1951 in Nkpa, Bende Local Government Area of Abia State, Nigeria. She attended the Methodist Girls Secondary School, Ovim, but her education was interrupted from 1967 to 1970 by the Nigerian Civil War. She went to London in 1970 to complete her education at the Kennington College of Further Education before going to the Kingston College of Further Education, Kingston, Surrey, UK. Agomo obtained both her Bachelor of Law (LL.B) and Masters of Law (LL.M) from the Queen Mary College, University of London in 1976 and 1977 respectively. From 1979 to 1980 she attended the Nigerian Law School before being called to Bar in 1980.

== Career ==
In 1981, Agomo joined the Department of Commercial and Industrial Law as a lecturer. From 1994 to 1995 she was in the United States as a senior Fulbright Research Scholar. Agomo was appointed a Professor of Law in 1999 and has served as the Head of the Department of Law three times. Agomo was a Fellow of the International Training Center of the ILO (ITCILO) and again in 2006 in Turin. In 2004, Professor Agomo was elected Dean of the Faculty of Law, making her the first elected female dean of a Faculty in the University of Lagos. In 2006, Agomo returned to the United States on the Visiting Fulbright Specialist Program. Professor Agomo was made an Honorary Fellow of the Queen Mary University of London in 2011.

Professor Agomo was a member of the National Universities Commission Accreditation Panel to evaluate law programmes at the University of Jos, and University of Maiduguri. She was the Leader of the Accreditation team to University of Ghana, Legon and the Kwame Nkrumah University of Science and Technology, Kumasi, Ghana. Professor Agomo was also a Member of the Council of Legal Education, Governing Committee Nigerian Institute of Advanced Legal Studies.
