= Bineta Diop =

Senegalese women's rights activist

Binet Diop
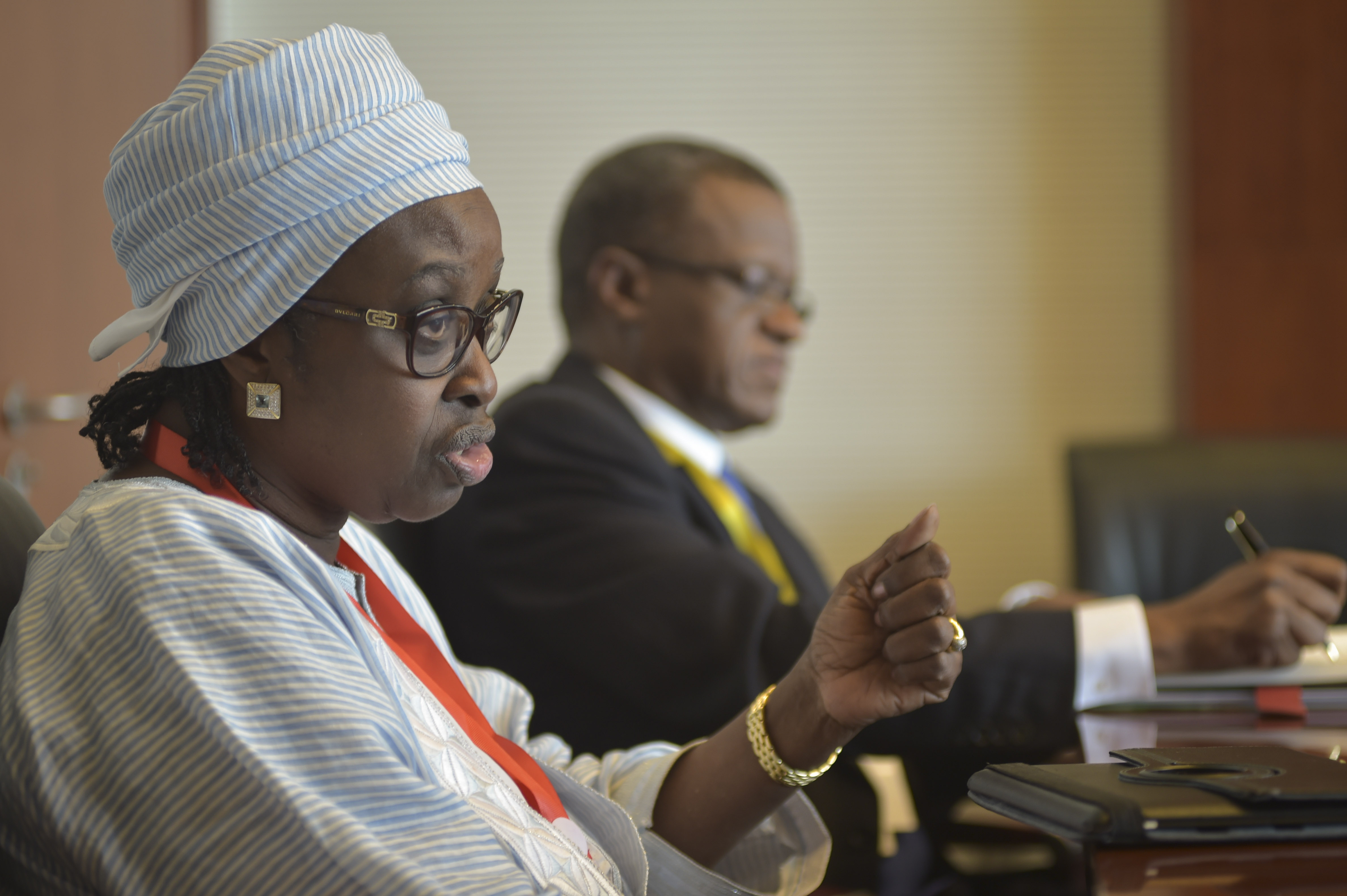
- Born: Guéoul, Senegal
- Occupation: Women's rights activist
- Notable work: Femmes Africa Solidarité
- Political party: Union progressiste sénégalaise
- Parent: Marèma Lô

Bineta Diop is a Senegalese women's rights activist. She is the founder of Femmes Africa Solidarité, a non-profit organization created to promote women's rights in Africa.

== Early life ==
Bineta Diop was born in Guéoul, a town in Senegal. She is the daughter of Marèma Lô, who was vice-president for women within the Union progressiste sénégalaise, a political party founded in 1958 by Léopold Sédar Senghor. As a feminist, Lô encouraged her four daughters to get an education. Diop studied business in Paris.

== Career ==
In 1981, Diop joined the International Commission of Jurists, a human rights NGO. In Geneva in 1996, she founded Femmes Africa Solidarité (FAS). Diop contributed to the implementation of the United Nations Security Council Resolution 1325 in 2000. She participated in the development of the African Charter on Human and Peoples' Rights (also known as the Banjul Charter) and, alongside African lawyers, the development of the Maputo Protocol, which was adopted in 2003. Diop participates in reconciliation processes in countries such as Burundi, Liberia and the Democratic Republic of the Congo, in election observation missions in several countries and serves on an inquiry commission about violence against women in South Sudan. She has been the special envoy of the president of the African Union Commission for women, peace, and security since 2014.

In 2011, Diop appeared on Time 100, an annual list of the one hundred most influential people published by the American magazine Time. The year after, she was knighted by the Legion of Honour. In 2013, Fondation Chirac gave her an award for her actions promoting female involvement in conflict prevention.

== Personal life ==
Diop is married to a diplomat.
