= Zara Kay =

Australian activist

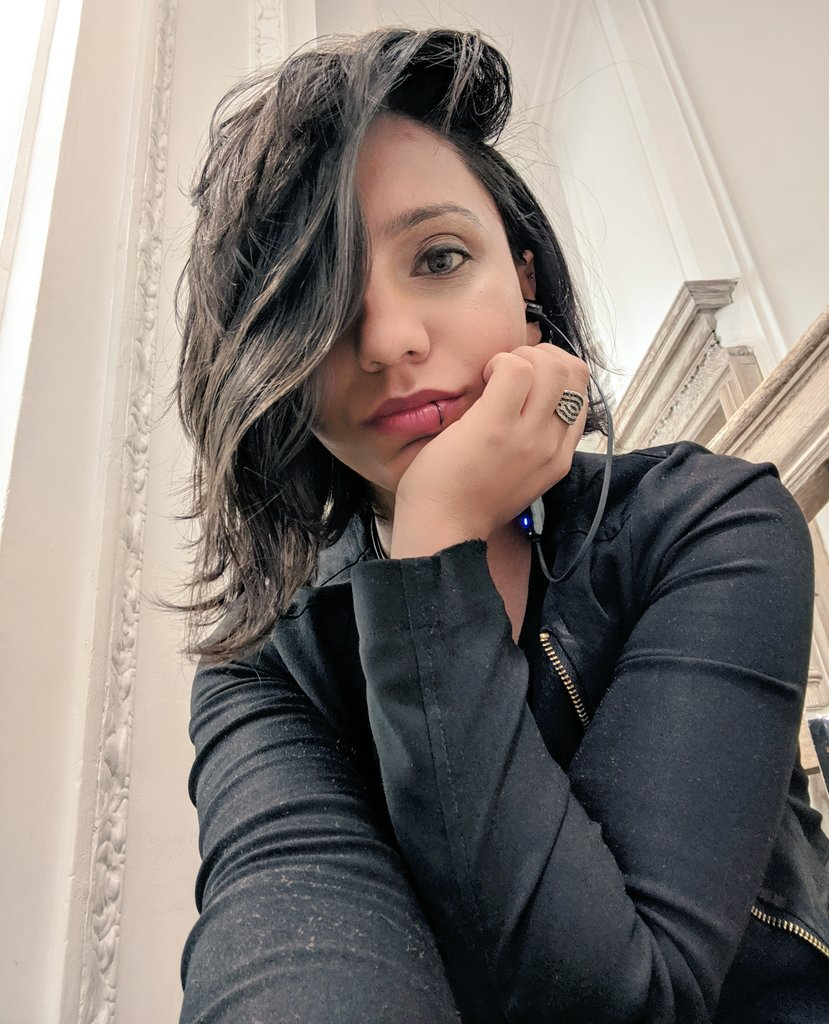
- Zara Kay in 2019
- Born: 1992 (age 33–34); Dar es Salaam, Tanzania
- Citizenship: Australian
- Education: Monash University
- Occupation: Information Technology
- Known for: Atheist and secular activist, women's rights activist
- Website: faithlesshijabi.org

Zara Kay (born 1992) is an ex-Muslim atheist, secular activist and women's rights activist, based in London. She is the founder of Faithless Hijabi, an international non-profit organisation that seeks to support the rights of Muslim-raised women, especially those who are in the process of leaving or have left Islam.

== Biography ==
Kay was born in Dar es Salaam, Tanzania in 1992, and raised as a Khoja Twelver Shia Muslim. The languages of English, Gujarati, Swahili, and Kutchi were spoken at home, but not Arabic. (Note: "At home she spoke Gujarati, Swahili, Kutchi and English, but significantly no one in the family knew any Arabic, and so had to read the Koran in translation.") (Note: "Not knowing Arabic she understood very little of the Koran.") Her mother was Kenyan and her father was Tanzanian. Her parents were conservative Muslims and she had four sisters and one brother. She began wearing the hijab from the age of eight, because she "wanted to be more pure, I wanted God to love me more." In hindsight, she said "that's not a choice. That is coercion."

Aged fourteen, Kay began to question her religion, wanting to know why she couldn't be friends with non-Muslims, listen to music, loosen her hijab or not want to get married at eighteen (like some of her friends). After finishing high school at age fifteen, she moved to Malaysia to attend Sunway University and then Monash University's Malaysian campus in Bandar Sunway at age sixteen. She stopped wearing the hijab at age eighteen before she moved to Australia.

After about 3½ years in Malaysia, when she was nineteen, Kay moved to Australia in 2012 in order to continue her studies at the Australian campus of Monash University in Melbourne. There, she finished her bachelor's degree in information technology and her master's degree in business information systems at the age of twenty-one. Kay got a job as an engineer for an IT company in Melbourne, and then worked as a technical support engineer at Google in Sydney until 2018, the same year in which she also became an Australian citizen. She relocated to London in 2019.

== Apostasy and activism ==
Although she began to not wear a hijab in 2011 when she was eighteen, Kay still identified as a Muslim, and said she "even went on pilgrimage (ziyarat)" to visit Shia Islamic holy sites in Iran (including Qom and Mashhad) in 2011 and Iraq in 2013.

Kay renounced Islam at the age of twenty-four, because she saw the religion as incompatible with her own values. Raised in a close-knit community, she says her decision to stop wearing the hijab and her eventual apostasy led to a lot of negative and hateful reactions from within her family and the wider social environment in Tanzania. After establishing boundaries, Kay and her family were able to repair the relationship, and she no longer felt threatened by community backlash.

Kay was one of the guest panelists at the "Celebrating Dissent" event at De Balie in Amsterdam, where the film Laïcité, Inch'Allah! (which translated into English means "Secularism, God willing!") was shown.

== Faithless Hijabi ==
Kay founded Faithless Hijabi (FH) in 2018 in Sydney. Faithless Hijabi is a storytelling platform that enables ex-Muslim and questioning Muslim women to share their stories of apostasy, doubt and freedom. While being a platform that creates safe spaces for women to express their dissent, Faithless Hijabi strives to take an active role in advocating for women's rights. FH is active on numerous social media in order to enable people to reach out for help. At present, the organisation primarily publishes stories and blogs in English, but has recently launched their Arabic social media pages. FH's mission is "Educate through stories," and "to empower an underrepresented group of women."

Faithless Hijabi was involved with the case of Rahaf Mohammed, the 18-year-old Saudi Arabian woman who managed to escape from her family in January 2019, but was held by Thai authorities at Bangkok Airport, after which she was able to raise international pressure via social media to allow her to continue to Canada.

Many of the women Faithless Hijabi help are abused, harassed, or worse, if they defy forced veiling. FH helps them find local support and mentors them to maintain boundaries and achieve financial independence. In 2020, Faithless Hijabi started sponsoring free mental health sessions for women in need.

== 2020 arrest ==
Kay was arrested in Dar es Salaam on 28 December 2020 and taken into police custody for 32 hours before being released on bail. She was advised to appear back before police authorities in the first week of January 2021. Kay was charged with not returning her Tanzanian passport after acquiring Australian citizenship, using the SIM card of a family member without registering it in her own name, and writing a satirical social media message about the handling of the COVID-19 pandemic in Tanzania. Ex-Muslim activists associated with The International Coalition of Ex-Muslims believed that Kay was questioned about the work of the organisation and why she left Islam during her interrogation, and they expressed concern for her welfare. Journalist Anthony Galloway reported that the charge of not registering a phone SIM card in one's own name has been used previously against other activists in Tanzania who have criticised the government.

According to Louis Kalumbia, as attributed to Gerald Kihinga, the Tanzanian Immigration Commissioner of Passports and Citizenship, Kay is being investigated for failing to declare her acquisition of Australian citizenship allegedly continuing with two passports without returning the Tanzanian one, and doubts over her possible motive in failure to declare her acquisition of Australian citizenship, and what exactly caused her to visit Tanzania. If Kay is found guilty of the charges, she could face a one-year jail sentence or be required to pay a fine not exceeding Sh500,000. Louis Kalumbia also reports that Kay has visited Tanzania by taking Tanzanian visa. Kay returned to Australia on March 4, 2021. Tanzanian police did not formally charge her but helped delay her travel by reportedly misplacing her Australian passport.

== See also ==
- Council of Ex-Muslims of Britain
- Tanzanians in the United Kingdom
