= Obioma Nnaemeka =

Nigerian-American academic (born 1948)

Obioma Grace Nnaemeka
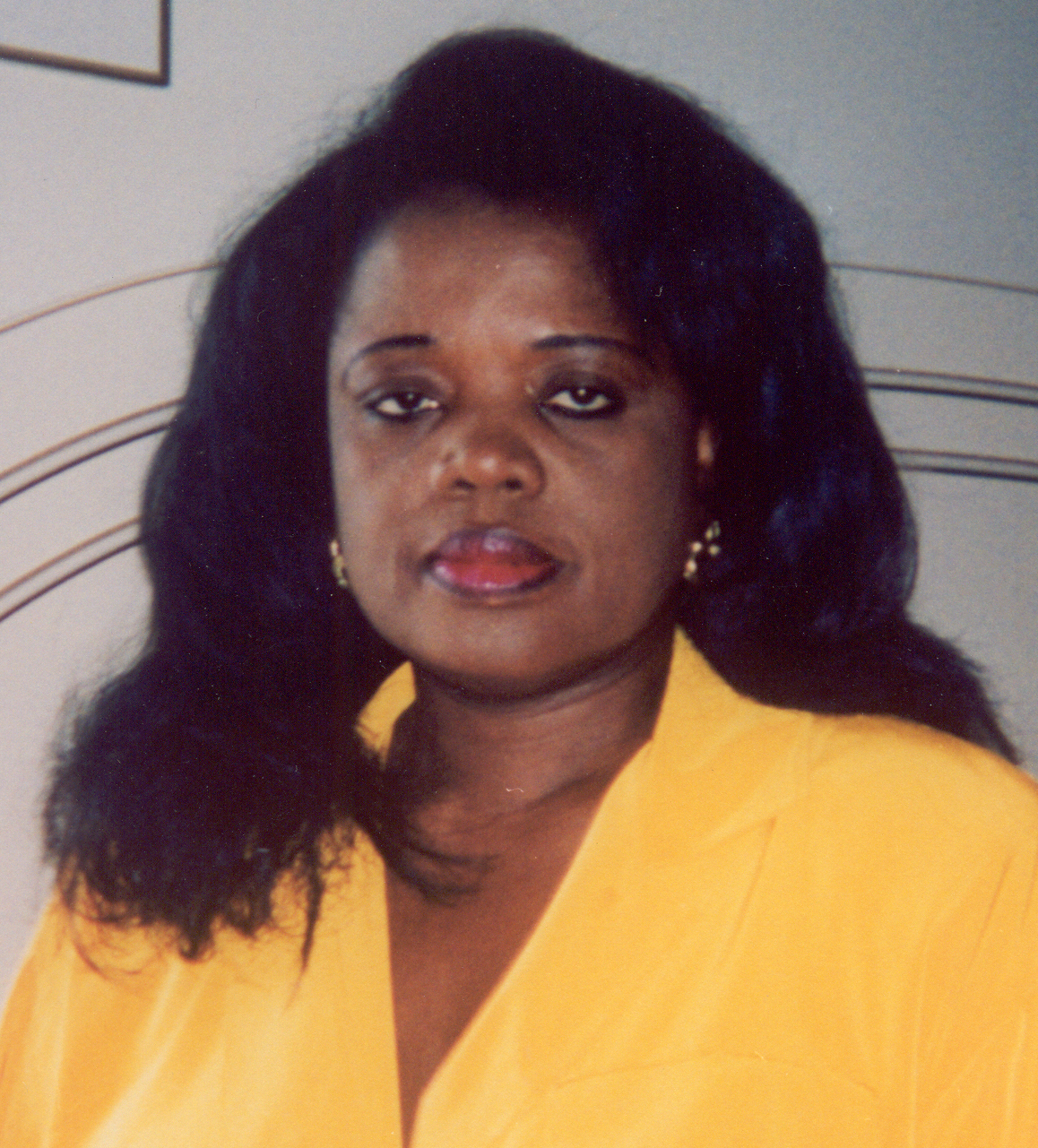
- Obioma Grace Nnaemeka
- Born: 1948 (age 78)
- Occupation: Professor, Writer, Commentator, Cultural critic
- Subject: Development, Women/Gender Studies, Literary Studies, Human rights, War and Conflict Resolution, African/African Diaspora Studies
- Notable works: Nego-Feminism: Theorizing, Practicing, and Pruning Africa's Way (2004)

Obioma Grace Nnaemeka (born 1948) is a Nigerian-American academic and intellectual with her academic specialization being Women and Gender Studies, Africa and Africa Diaspora Studies and French Literature. She is known for being the creator of and theorizing on the term “Nego-Feminism”. Nnaemeka serves at the Indiana University, Indianapolis in the capacity of Chancellor’s Professor. She is the first Black female faculty at the university, and in addition, she is the first continental African to hold the title of Chancellor’s Professor at the same university.

Nnaemeka is a graduate of the prestigious University of Nigeria (UNN), Nsukka, where she obtained her undergraduate degree. Her graduate studies were carried out at University of Minnesota where she acquired her doctoral degree.

Obioma Nnaemeka has been engaged in numerous academic, intellectual and adjacent activities which include (but are not limited to) being the founding president of the Association of African Women Scholars (AAWS), organizing transcontinental conferences within her research interests, aimed at bridging academic research on human rights, gender and African contexts, engaging in academic activism covering over 35 countries. She has been the director of the Women’s Studies program at Indianapolis University, Indianapolis and a consultant for several international organizations like the World Bank and the United Nations (UN). In her role as a consultant to these international bodies, she was engaged in projects related to the role of women in post-genocide reconciliation, conflict resolution and environmental justice.

Nnaemeka has written and edited several books, authored and co-authored numerous scholarly articles related to feminist theory.

Her many honors received include the Nigerian Achiever of the Year Award for Leadership, Daughter of Africa Award and honorary doctorates from two universities – University of KwaZulu Natal in 2023 and American University of Paris in 2022.

== Early life and education ==
Born in Agulu, Anambra state, Nigeria, Nnaemeka is from an Igbo family and has six other siblings. Even though her family possessed limited resources financially, her mother and father prioritized the education of their children. By working steadfastly to cover the cost of schooling for their children, in addition to support from their community and family members, they were able to make heavy investments into the education of their children. Of note amongst her siblings is elder sister to Nnaemeka – Joy and her husband, Vincent Maduka – who played a huge role in enabling Nnaemeka pursue her studies amidst different kinds of challenges.

Nnaemeka earned her Bachelor of Arts from the University of Nigeria, Nsukka, where she studied African studies, French and German. She graduated with honors (B.A. Hons.)

In 1989 she obtained her PhD in French and Francophone Studies from the University of Minnesota. She graduated with distinction.

== Academic interests ==
Before arriving at Indiana University, Nnaemeka taught at the University of Nigeria, Nsukka and at The College of Wooster, Wooster, Ohio. She is a board member of the Global Women’s Leadership Center at the Leavey School of Business.

Nnaemeka is interested in black women writers, feminist theory, transitional feminism, Francophone literatures, the oral and written works of Africans and the African diaspora, as well as gender and human rights. Gender-studies scholar Opportune Zongo wrote in 1996 that "[t]he power of Nnaemeka's work lies in her clear vision, superb intellect, excellent command of language, good sense of humor, and profound knowledge of the African landscape."

She developed the idea of "nego-feminism (the feminism of negotiation; no ego feminism) as a term that names African feminisms." This bases itself around the family and complementarity, rather than individual interests. Nego-feminism is an academic concept introduced by Dr. Obioma Nnaemeka at international conference presentations on African feminism in 2003. A formal theorization was subsequently presented in her paper title “Nego-feminism : Theorizing, Practicing, and Pruning Africa's Way”(2004) She arrived at this framework by extensive examination of African gender dynamics, critiquing the tactics employed by Western feminism and identifying them as unsuitable for sociocultural realities found in different African realities. Nego-feminism is firmly built on empirical observations of the agency exhibited by African women, drawing particularly on the relational harmony and adaptation found in Igbo cultural practices.

== Service ==
While at the University of Minnesota in pursuit of her PhD, Nnaemeka was the president of the Nigerian Students Association and was also active in the International Student Council. Additionally, Dr. Nnaemeka is the founder and president of the Association of African Women Scholars, as well as the president and CEO of the Jessie Obidiegwu Education Fund, an NGO dedicated to the education of women and girls in Africa. Combining her interests in research and teaching, Nnaemeka has consulted with various international agencies and academic institutions, including the United Nations and the World Bank.

== Awards and positions ==
- President, Association of African Women Scholars
- CEO, Jessie Obidiegwu Education Fund
- Convener of Internal Conference on Women in African and the African Diaspora
- Distinguished Leadership Award for Internationals from University of Minnesota
- Rockefeller Humanist in Residence
- Edith Kreeger Wolf Distinguished Visiting Professor
- SIDA (Sweden)
- IRDC (Canada)

== Selected works ==
=== Scholarly articles ===
- Nnaemeka, O. (2004). African Voices on September 11: Introduction. Signs: Journal of Women in Culture and Society, 29, 601 - 603.
- Development, Cultural Forces, and Women's Achievements in Africa Nnaemeka, O. (1996). Development, Cultural Forces, and Women's Achievements in Africa*. Law & Policy, 18, 251-279.
- Nnaemeka, O., Okafor, C., Smith, P., Ajayi-Soyinka, O., & Zongo, O. (2004). Association of African Women Scholars (AAWS) Condemns the Rape of Njeeri Ngugi, Wife of Professor Ngugi wa Thiong’o. The Black Scholar, 34(3), 80.
- Nnaemeka, O. (1992). Proceedings of the First International Conference on Women in Africa and the African Diaspora : Bridges Across Activism and the Academy, Nsukka, Nigeria, July 13-18, 1992; volume 10, religion and society.
- Lionnet, F., Nnaemeka, O., Perry, S.H., & Schenck, C.M. (2004). Introduction. Signs: Journal of Women in Culture and Society, 29, 517 - 518.
- Nnaemeka, O. (2000). The Clinton Controversies and the African (Igbo) World. West Africa Review, 2.
- Nnaemeka, O. (2006). Introduction: Sideline Insurgencies and Gendered Art. Meridians: feminism, race, transnationalism, 6, 1 - 21.
- Nnaemeka, O. (1998). Beyond the Controversies: Igbo Perspectives on Knowledge, Speech and Power. Africa Update, 5.
- Nnaemeka, O. (1998). Literary Criticism as Disciplinary Failure: Rereading Mariama Ba's Novels.
- Nnaemeka, O. (2007). Re-imagining the Diaspora: History, Responsibility, and Commitment in an Age of Globalization. Dialectical Anthropology, 31, 127-141.
- Nnaemeka, O. (1989). Toward a feminist criticism of Nigerian literature. Feminist Issues, 9, 73-87.
- Nnaemeka, O. (1992). Richard Wright: Climate of Fear and Violence. Western journal of black studies, 16, 14-20.
- Nnaemeka, O. (2008). Racialization and the Colonial Architecture: Othering and the Order of Things. PMLA/Publications of the Modern Language Association of America, 123, 1748 - 1751.
- Nnaemeka, O., & Korieh, C.J. (2011). Shaping our struggles: Nigerian women in history, culture and social change.
- Nnaemeka, O. (1991). Book Review:Male Daughters, Female Husbands: Gender and Sex in an African Society Ifi Amadiume. Signs.
- Nnaemeka, O. (2004). Book Review: Uche Azikiwe (compl.), Women in Nigeria: An Annotated Bibliography. (Westport, CT: Greenwood Press, 1996), xi, 145 pp. Dialectical Anthropology, 28, 241-243.
- Nnaemeka, O. (2009). Feminist Bioethics and Global Responsibility: Exploring Health Care Delivery in Kenya. IJFAB: International Journal of Feminist Approaches to Bioethics, 2, 71 - 76.
- Lionnet, F., Nnaemeka, O., Perry, S.H., & Schenck, C.M. (2004). The Human Face of Development: Disciplinary Convergence and New Arenas of Engagement. Signs: Journal of Women in Culture and Society, 29, 291 - 297.
- Black Women Writers. (1999). The Black Scholar, 29(2–3), 1.
- Nnaemeka, O. (2005). International Conferences as Sites for Transnational Feminist Struggles: The Case of the First International Conference on Women in Africa and the African Diaspora.

=== Books ===
- (1996). ed. Sisterhood, Feminisms, and Power: From Africa to the Diaspora. Trenton, NJ: Africa World Press.
- (2005). ed. Female Circumcision and the Politics of Knowledge: African Women in Imperialist Discourse. Westport: Praeger Press.
- (1997). ed. The Politics of (M)Othering Womanhood, Identity and Resistance in African Literature. London: Routledge

=== Book chapters ===
- Nnaemeka, O., & Ezeilo, J.N. (2005). Engendering Human Rights.
- Nnaemeka, O., & Nkealah, N. Introduction. Gendered Violence and Human Rights in Black World Literature and Film.
- Kalu, O.U., Korieh, C.J., Nwokeji, G.U., & Nnaemeka, O. (2005). Religion, history, and politics in Nigeria : essays in honor of Ogbu U. Kalu.
- Nnaemeka, O. (2005). The Eye and the Other.
- Salles, A.L., Perry, C.K., Widdows, H., Acero, L., Bertomeu, M.J., Guerra, M.J., Ouko, J.O., Nnaemeka, O., Meghani, Z., Eckenwiler, L., Stoebenau, K., Luna, F., Plante, L.A., Sañudo, M., de Melo-Martín, I., Altınay, R.E., Mahowald, M.B., Tremain, S.L., & Wayne, K. (1859). Acknowledgments. The Chicago Medical Journal, 16, 63 - 63.
- Nnaemeka, O. (2005). Why the Snake-Lizard killed his mother.
- Shih, S., Marcos, S., Nnaemeka, O., & Waller, M.R. (2005). Conversation on “Feminist Imperialism and the Politics of Difference”.
