= Marie-Angélique Savané =

Senegalese politician

- Born: 2 November 1947 (age 78); Dakar, Senegal
- Occupation(s): Sociologist; Activist
- Spouse: Landing Savané

Marie-Angélique Savané (née Sagna; born 2 November 1947) is a Senegalese sociologist and feminist activist, who has been "an extremely vocal proponent of legal and social reforms in Senegalese society on behalf of women", according to the Dictionary of African Biography. She has been called one of the pioneers of feminism in Africa.

== Early life ==
She was born on 2 November 1947 in Dakar, Senegal, into a Catholic family.

== Career ==
From 1974 to 1978, Savané was Editor-in-Chief of the magazine Famille et Développement (Family and Development), "sub-Saharan Africa's self-help magazine". During her time in charge, she moved the magazine from a Western to an African viewpoint, "helping Africans help themselves".

Savané has worked for the United Nations, and as a consultant to various UN organisations for many years.

Savané is a co-founder of the Association of African Women for Research.

== Personal life ==
She is married to Landing Savané (born 1945) a left-wing Senegalese politician, and the Secretary-General of And-Jëf/African Party for Democracy and Socialism.

They are the parents of the retired professional basketball player Sitapha Savané, who has also played for the Senegal national basketball team.
