= 68th Locarno Film Festival =

Film festival in Locarno, Switzerland

- Opening film: Ricki and the Flash directed by Jonathan Demme
- Location: Locarno, Switzerland
- Founded: 1946
- Awards: Golden Leopard: Right Now, Wrong Then directed by Hong Sang-soo.
- Artistic director: Carlo Chatrian
- Festival date: Opening: 5 August 2015; Closing: 15 August 2015
- Website: LFF

Locarno Film Festival
- 69th 67th

The 68th Locarno Film Festival was held from 5 to 15 August 2015 in Locarno, Switzerland. The opening film was Ricki and the Flash directed by Jonathan Demme. It was screened on the Piazza Grande, the 8,000 seat open-air theater.

The festival held a comprehensive retrospective devoted to the work of director Sam Peckinpah. Some festival guests included then 26-year old director Bi Gan with his film Kaili Blues along with Amy Schumer and Bill Hader who were in town to present their new film Trainwreck. Edward Norton received the Excellence Award and gave a talk on cinema.

The Leopard of Honor was awarded to Michael Cimino, for his career achievements in cinema. During his Q&A he took up double his allotted time, criticizing some in attendance, and talking for more the 2 hours This year's Open Doors section was devoted to Algeria, Libya, Morocco and Tunisia.

The Golden Leopard, the festival's top prize, was awarded to Right Now, Wrong Then directed by Hong Sang-soo. This was Hong Sang-soo's first ever main competition win at a major European film festival.

== Official Jury ==
- Udo Kier, German actor
- Nadav Lapid, Israeli director.

== Official Sections ==
The following films were screened in these sections:

=== Piazza Grande ===
The following films were screened on the Piazza Grande:

Piazza Grande: Prefestival

Original Title	English Title	Director(s)	Year	Production Country
E La Nave Va	And the Ship Sails On	Federico Fellini	1984	Italia
Pat Garrett & Billy The Kid		Sam Peckinpah	1973	USA

Piazza Grande: Special Event

Original Title	English Title	Director(s)	Year	Production Country
Asino Vola	Asino Money	Marcello Fonte, Paolo Tripodi	2015	Italia

Piazza Grande

Original Title	English Title	Director(s)	Year	Production Country
Amnesia		Barbet Schroeder	2015	Switzerland
Bombay Velvet		Anurag Kashyap	2015	India
Der Staat Gegen Fritz Bauer	The State Against Fritz Bauer	Lars Kraume	2015	Germany
Erlkönig	Erlking	Georges Schwizgebel	2015	Switzerland
Floride	Florida	Philippe Le Guay	2015	France
Guibord S'En Va-T-En Guerre	Guibord is Going to War	Philippe Falardeau	2015	Canada
Heliopolis		Sérgio Machado	2015	Brazil
I Pugni In Tasca	The Fists in your Pocket	Marco Bellocchio	1965	Italia
Jack		Elisabeth Scharang	2015	Austria
La Belle Saison	Summertime	Catherine Corsini	2015	France
La Vanité	Vanity	Lionel Baier	2015	Switzerland
Le Dernier Passage	The Last Passage	Pascal Magontier	2015	France
Me and Earl and the Dying Girl		Alfonso Gomez-Rejon	2014	USA
Pastorale Cilentana	Cilento Pastoral	Mario Martone	2015	Italia
Qing Tian Jie Yi Hao	The Laundryman	LEE Chung	2015	Taiwan
Ricki and the Flash		Jonathan Demme	2015	USA
Southpaw		Antoine Fuqua	2015	USA
The Deer Hunter		Michael Cimino	1978	Great Britain
Trainwreck		Judd Apatow	2015	USA

=== Main Competition ===
The following films were screened in the International Competition:

Highlighted title indicates Golden Leopard winner:

Original Title	English Title	Director(s)	Production Country
Bella E Perduta	Beautiful and Lost	Pietro Marcello	Italia
Brat Dejan		Bakur Bakuradze	Russia
Chant D'Hiver	Winter Song	Otar Iosseliani	France
Chevalier		Athina Rachel Tsangari	Greece
Cosmos		Andrzej Żuławski	France
Entertainment		Rick Alverson	USA
Happy Hour		Ryusuke Hamaguchi	Japan
Heimatland	Home Country	Lisa Blatter, Gregor Frei, Jan Gassmann, Benny Jaberg, Carmen Jaquier, Michael Krummenacher, Jonas Meier, Tobias Nölle, Lionel Rupp, Mike Scheiwiller	Switzerland
James White		Josh Mond	USA
Jigeumeun Matgo Geuttaeneun Teullida	Right Now, Wrong Then	Hong Sang-soo	South Korea
Ma Dar Behesht	Per Fateful	Sina Ataeian Dena	Iran
No Home Movie		Chantal Akerman	Belgium
O Futebol	Football	Sergio Oksman	Spain
Schneider vs. Bax		Alex van Warmerdam	Netherlands
Suite Armoricaine	Armorican Suite	Pascale Breton	France
Sulanga Gini Aran	Dark in the White Light	Vimukthi Jayasundara	Sri Lanka
Te Prometo Anarquía	I Promise You Anarchy	Julio Hernández Cordón	Mexico
The Sky Trembles And The Earth Is Afraid And The Two Eyes Are Not Brothers		Ben Rivers	Great Britain
Tikkun		Avishai Sivan	Israel

=== Filmmakers of the Present ===
The Concorso Cineasti del Presente, also known as the Filmmakers of the Present Competition, showcases first and second feature films from emerging filmmakers. The following films were screened in the Concorso Cineasti del Presente section:

Filmmakers of the Present

Original Title	English Title	Director(s)	Year	Production Country
Dead Slow Ahead		Mauro Herce	2015	Spain
Der Nachtmahr	The Nightmare	AKIZ	2015	Germany
Dom Juan	House Juan	Vincent Macaigne	2015	France
Dream Land		Steve Chen	2015	Cambodia
El Movimiento	The Movement	Benjamin Naishtat	2015	Argentina
Keeper		Guillaume Senez	2015	Belgium
Le Grand Jeu	The Great Game	Nicolas Pariser	2015	France
Les Êtres Chers	Dear Beings	Anne Émond	2015	Canada
Lu Bian Ye Can	Kaili Blues	Bi Gan	2015	China
Moj Brate - Mio Fratello	Moj Brate - My Brother	Nazareno Manuel Nicoletti	2015	Italia
Olmo & The Seagull		Petra Costa, Lea Glob	2014	Denmark
Siembra	Sowing	Santiago Lozano, Ángela Osorio Rojas	2015	Colombia
The Waiting Room		Igor Drljaca	2015	Canada
Thithi	Funeral	Raam Reddy	2015	India

=== Out of Competition ===
The following films were screened Out of Competition:

Out of Competition: Feature Films

Original Title	English Title	Director(s)	Year	Production Country
Contre-Pouvoirs	Counterpowers	Malek Bensmaïl	2015	Algérie
Fragments Du Paradis	Fragments of Paradise	Stéphane Goël	2015	Switzerland
Genitori	Parents	Alberto Fasulo	2015	Italia
I Sogni Del Lago Salato	The Dreams of the Salted Lake	Andrea Segre	2015	Italia
Kaki Kouba	Kaki	SÔDA Kazuhiro	2015	Japan
Kiev/Moscow. Part 1		Elena Khoreva	2015	Russia
Le Bois Dont Les Rêves Sont Faits	The Wood Whose Dreams are Made	Claire Simon	2015	France
Romeo E Giulietta	Romeo and Giulietta	Massimo Coppola	2015	Italia
Topophilia		Peter Bo Rappmund	2015	USA
Vivere Alla Grande	Live	Fabio Leli	2015	Italia
Yes No Maybe		Kaspar Kasics	2015	Switzerland

Out of Competition: Art Basel

Original Title	English Title	Director(s)	Year	Production Country
Anfangsszene	Starting Scene	Karolin Meunier	2015	Germany
It, Heat, Hit		Laure Prouvost	2010	Great Britain
The Girl Chewing Gum		John Smith	1976	Great Britain
Turbulent		Shirin Neshat	1998	USA
Twelve		Melanie Manchot	2015	Great Britain

Out of Competition: Brilhadora Canvas

Original Title	English Title	Director(s)	Year	Production Country
Garoto	Boy	Júlio Bressane	2015	Brazil
O Espelho	The Mirror	Rodrigo Lima	2015	Brazil
O Prefeito	The Mayor	Bruno Safadi	2015	Brazil
Origem Do Mundo	Origin of the World	Moa Batsow	2015	Brazil

Out of Competition: Shorts

Original Title	English Title	Director(s)	Year	Production Country
Estratos De La Imagen	Image Strata	Lois Patiño	2015	Spain
L'Architecte De Saint-Gaudens	The Architect of Saint-Gaudens	Serge Bozon, Julie Desprairies	2015	France
Noite Sem Distância	Nightless Night	Lois Patiño	2015	Portugal
Riot		Nathan Silver	2015	USA
The Glory Of Filmmaking In Portugal		Manuel Mozos	2015	Portugal
Undisclosed Recipients		Sandro Aguilar	2015	Portugal

=== Open Doors ===
This year's Open Doors section was devoted to Algeria, Libya, Morocco and Tunisia. The following films were screened in the Open Doors section :

Open Doors: Screenings

Original Title	English Title	Director(s)	Year	Production Country
Bla Cinima	Bla Cinema	Lamine Ammar-Khodja	2014	France
Gabbla	Cage	Tariq Teguia	2008	Algérie
Histoire De Judas	History of Judas	Rabah Ameur-Zaïmeche	2015	France
Horra	That's the	Moez Kamoun	2014	Tunisia
La Chine Est Encore Loin	China is Still Far Away	Malek Bensmaïl	2009	France
Les Terrasses	The Terraces	Merzak Allouache	2013	France
Sur La Planche	On the Edge	Leïla Kilani	2011	Morocco

Open Doors: Libya Shorts

Original Title	English Title	Director(s)	Year	Production Country
80		Muhannad Lamin	2012	Libia
Dead End		Ahmed Aboub	2015	Libia
Drifting		Samer S. Omar	2015	Libia
Graffiti		Anas El Gomati, Ibrahim El Mayet	2012	Libia
Land Of Men		Kelly Ali	2015	Libia
Mission Impossible		Najmi Own	2015	Libia
The Mosque		Farag Al-Sharif	2015	Libia
The Runner		Mohannad Eissa	2014	Libia
The Sandwich Maker		Samer S. Omar	2014	Libia
The Secret Room		Ibrahim Y. Shebani	2012	Libia

Open Doors: Shorts

Original Title	English Title	Director(s)	Year	Production Country
2=1=0		Rim Mejdi	2010	Morocco
En Dehors De La Ville	Outside the City	Rim Mejdi	2014	Morocco
La Fièvre	Fever	Safia Benhaim	2014	France
Retour, Vers Un Point D'Équilibre	Back, Towards a Point of Balance	Nadia Chouïeb	2009	Algérie
Tarzan, Don Quichotte Et Nous	Tarzan, Don Quixote and We	Hassen Ferhani	2013	Algérie

=== Leopards of Tomorrow ===
The following films were screened in Leopards of Tomorrow (Pardi di Domani) section:

==== Special Program ====
Special Programs - Leopards of Tomorrow
Original title	English title	Director(s)	Year	Production country
Consummate			2015	Bosnia and Herzegovina

==== International Competition ====
International Competition - Leopards of Tomorrow
Original Title	English Title	Director(s)	Year	Production Country
Dear Director		Marcus Lindeen	2015	Sweden
Des Millions De Larmes	Millions of Tears	Natalie Beder	2015	France
Eco		Xacio Baño	2015	Spain
Fils Du Loup	Son of the Wolf	Lola Quivoron	2015	France
Gulliver	Goldiver	María Alché	2015	Argentina
História De Uma Pena	History of a Penalty	Leonardo Mouramateus	2015	Brazil
I Remember Nothing		Zia Anger	2015	USA
Junilyn Has		Carlo Francisco Manatad	2015	Philippines
Km 73		Radu Ghelbereu	2015	Great Britain
La Impresión De Una Guerra	The Impression of a War	Camilo Restrepo	2015	France
La Novia De Frankenstein	Frankenstein's Girlfriend	Agostina Galvez, Francisco Lezama	2015	Argentina
Lampedusa	Lampedus	Philip Cartelli, Mariangela Ciccarello	2015	Italia
Las Cuatro Esquinas Del Círculo	The Four Corners of the Circle	Katarina Stanković	2015	Germany
Mama		Davit Pirtskhalava	2015	Georgia
Maria Do Mar		João Rosas	2015	Portugal
Nothing Human		Tom Rosenberg	2015	USA
Nueva Vida	New Life	Kiro Russo	2015	Argentina
O Que Resta	What Remains	Jola Wieczorek	2015	Austria
O Teto Sobre Nós	The Ceiling About Us	Bruno Carboni	2015	Brazil
Renaître	Reborn	Jean-François Ravagnan	2015	Belgium
Sa Pagitan Ng Pagdalaw At Paglimot	Between Visiting and Forgetting	Liryc Dela Cruz	2015	Philippines
Salarié Oriental	Oriental Employee	Rinat Bekchintayev, Egor Shevchenko	2015	Russia
Shikuf		Osi Wald	2014	Israel
Yellow Fieber		Konstantina Kotzamani	2015	Greece
Zeus		Pavel Vesnakov	2015	Germany

==== National Competition ====
National Competition - Leopards of Tomorrow
Original title	English title	Director(s)	Year	Production country
Babor Casanova	Casanova Babor	Karim Sayad	2015	Switzerland
D'Ombres Et D'Ailes	Shadows and Wings	Eleonora Marinoni, Elice Meng	2015	Switzerland
Ein Ort Wie Dieser	A Place Like this	Philip Meyer	2015	Switzerland
Hausarrest	House Arrest	Matthias Sahli	2015	Switzerland
Joconde		Lora Mure-Ravaud	2015	Switzerland
Just Another Day In Egypt		Nikola Ilić, Corina Schwingruber Ilič	2015	Switzerland
La Rivière Sous La Langue	The River under the Language	Carmen Jaquier	2015	Switzerland
Le Barrage	The Dam	Samuel Grandchamp	2015	Switzerland
Les Monts S'Embrasent	The Mountains Get Rid of		2015	Switzerland
Persi	Lost	Caterina Mona	2015	Switzerland
The Meadow		Jela Hasler	2015	Switzerland

=== Signs of Life ===
The following films were screened in the Signs of Life section:

Original Title	English Title	Director(s)	Year	Production Country
88:88		Isiah Medina	2015	Canada
Chi		Jiongjiong Qiu	2015	China
Deux Rémi, Deux	Two Rémi, Two	Pierre Léon	2015	France
L'Infinita Fabbrica Del Duomo	The Infinite Fabbrica Del Duomo	Massimo D'Anolfi, Martina Parenti	2015	Italia
L'Accademia Delle Muse	The Muse Academy	José Luis Guerín	2015	Spain
Machine Gun Or Typewriter?		Travis Wilkerson	2015	USA
Recollection		Kamal Aljafari	2015	Germany
Slackjaw		Zach Weintraub	2014	USA

=== History (s) of Cinema ===
The festival's Histoire(s) du Cinéma section showcases films deemed significant to the evolution of cinema. Films by the festival's career award winners are presented in this section. The following films were screened in Histoire(s) du Cinéma section:

Original Title	English Title	Director(s)	Year	Production Country
A Qualcuno Piacerà - Storia E Storie Di Elio Pandolfi	Someone will Like - History and Stories of Elio Pandolfi	Claudio De Pasqualis, Caterina Taricano	2015	Italia
I Don'T Belong Anywhere - Le Cinéma De Chantal Akerman	I Don't Belong AnyWhere - Chantal Akerman's Cinema	Marianne Lambert	2015	Belgium
Excellence Award Moët & Chandon Edward Norton
25th Hour		Spike Lee	2002	USA
Fight Club		David Fincher	1999	USA
The Painted Veil		John Curran	2006	China
Karlovy Vary
Vynález Zkázy	Invention	Karel Zeman	1958	ex Cecoslovacchia
Leopard Club Award Andy Garcia
The Lost City		Andy Garcia	2005	USA
The Untouchables		Brian De Palma	1987	USA
Tribute to Alex Phillips
Crepúsculo	Twilight	Julio Bracho	1944	Mexico
En La Palma De Tu Mano	In the Palm of Your Hand	Roberto Gavaldón	1950	Mexico
La Mujer Del Puerto	The Woman of the Port	Arcady Boytler, Raphael J. Sevilla	1933	Mexico
Subida Al Cielo	Mexican Bus Ride	Luis Buñuel	1952	Mexico
Leopard of Honor (Swisscom) Michael Cimino
Heaven's Gate		Michael Cimino	1980	USA
Thunderbolt and Lightfoot		Michael Cimino	1974	USA
Year of the Dragon		Michael Cimino	1986	USA
Career Leopard Bulle Ogier
Belle Toujours	Always Beautiful	Manoel de Oliveira	2006	Portugal
Et Crac	And Crac	Jean Douchet	1969	France
La Salamandre	Salamander	Alain Tanner	1971	Switzerland
La Vallée	The Valley	Barbet Schroeder	1972	France
Le Pont Du Nord	The North Bridge	Jacques Rivette	1981	France
Les Idoles	Idols	Marc'O	1968	France
Career Leopard Marlen Khutsiev
Beskonečnost'	Infinity	Marlen Khutsiev	1992	ex URSS
Byl Mesjaz Maj	Was Mesjaz Maja	Marlen Khutsiev	1970	ex URSS
Dva Fjodora	Two Fjodora	Marlen Khutsiev	1958	ex URSS
Ijul'Skij Dožd'	Ijul'skij Dozd '	Marlen Khutsiev	1966	ex URSS
Khutsiev. Motor Idjot!	Hutsiev. Idiot Motor!	Peter Shepotinnik	2015	Russia
Posleslovie	Epilogue	Marlen Khutsiev	1983	ex URSS
Zastava Il'Iča - Chernoviki, Vyrezki, Varianty		Marlen Khutsiev	2015	Russia
Zastava Il'Iča	Flag Il'ič	Marlen Khutsiev	1965	ex URSS
Leopard of Honor (Pardo D'onore Swisscom) Marco Bellocchio
Buongiorno, Notte	Good Morning, Night	Marco Bellocchio	2003	Italia
L'Ora Di Religione	My Mother's Smile	Marco Bellocchio	2002	Italia
Vincere		Marco Bellocchio	2009	France
Raimondo Rezzonico Prize Kitano Takeshi
Dolls		KITANO Takeshi	2002	Japan
Hana-Bi		KITANO Takeshi	1997	Japan
Ren Xiao Yao		Jia Zhangke	2002	South Korea
Swiss Cinema Rediscovered
Dällebach Kari		Kurt Früh	1970	Switzerland
Hinter Den Sieben Gleisen	Behind the Seven Tracks	Kurt Früh	1959	Switzerland
Omaggio A Georges Schwizgebel	Tribute to Georges Schwizgebel	Georges Schwizgebel		Switzerland
Ticino Cinema Prize
L'Amore Probabilmente	Love Probably	Giuseppe Bertolucci	2001	Italia
Vision Award Walter Murch
Apocalypse Now		Francis Ford Coppola	1979	USA
Particle Fever		Mark Levinson	2013	USA
Return to Oz		Walter Murch	1985	Great Britain
Touch of Evil		Orson Welles	1958	USA

=== Retrospective – Sam Peckinpah ===
The following films were screened in the Retrospective to Sam Peckinpah:

Sam Peckinpah: Archives
Original Title	English Title	Director(s)	Year	Production Country
Invasion of the Body Snatchers		Don Siegel	1956	USA
Jinxed!		Don Siegel	1982	USA
Passion & Poetry - The Ballad of Sam Peckinpah		Mike Siegel	2009	Germany
Portrait of a Madonna		Sam Peckinpah	1952	USA
Sam Peckinpah: Man of Iron		Paul Joyce	1992	USA
Sam Peckinpah: Portrait		Umberto Berlenghini, Michelangelo Dalto	2006	France
The Cincinnati Kid		Norman Jewison	1965	USA
The Glory Guys		Arnold Laven	1965	USA
The Wild Bunch: An Album in Montage		Paul Seydor	1996	USA
Tom Tit Tot	Tit Titus	Sam Peckinpah	1958	USA
Étoiles Et Toiles / Sam Peckinpah	Stars and Canvases / Sam Peckinpah	Jean-Claude Arié, Olivier Assayas	1985	France
Sam Peckinpah: Films
Bring Me the Head of Alfredo Garcia		Sam Peckinpah	1974	USA
Convoy		Sam Peckinpah	1978	USA
Junior Bonner		Sam Peckinpah	1972	USA
Major Dundee		Sam Peckinpah	1965	USA
Pat Garrett and Billy the Kid		Sam Peckinpah	1973	USA
Ride the High Country		Sam Peckinpah	1962	USA
Straw Dogs		Sam Peckinpah	1971	USA
The Ballad of Cable Hogue		Sam Peckinpah	1970	USA
Cross of Iron		Sam Peckinpah	1977	Great Britain
The Deadly Companions		Sam Peckinpah	1961	USA
The Getaway		Sam Peckinpah	1972	USA
The Killer Elite		Sam Peckinpah	1975	USA
The Osterman Weekend		Sam Peckinpah	1983	USA
The Wild Bunch		Sam Peckinpah	1969	USA
Sam Peckinpah: TV Series
ABC Stage 67 / Noon Wine		Sam Peckinpah	1966	USA
Broken Arrow / The Teacher		Morse Hollingsworth	1957	USA
Klondike / Swoger's Mule		Elliot Lewis	1960	USA
Man Without A Gun / The Kidder		John H. Peyser	1959	USA
Route 66 / Mon Petit Chou	Route 66 / My Little Cabbage	Sam Peckinpah	1961	USA
Tales Of Wells Fargo / Apache Gold		Earl Bellamy	1957	USA
The Dick Powell Theater / Pericles On 31St Street		Sam Peckinpah	1962	USA
The Dick Powell Theater / The Losers		Sam Peckinpah	1963	USA
The Rifleman / Home Ranch		Arnold Laven	1958	USA
The Rifleman / The Baby Sitter		Sam Peckinpah	1959	USA
The Rifleman / The Boarding House		Sam Peckinpah	1959	USA
The Rifleman / The Marshal		Sam Peckinpah	1958	USA
The Rifleman / The Money Gun		Sam Peckinpah	1959	USA
The Rifleman / The Sharpshooter		Arnold Laven	1958	USA
The Westerner / Brown		Sam Peckinpah	1960	USA
The Westerner / Dos Pinos		Donald McDougall	1960	USA
The Westerner / Ghost Of A Chance		Bruce Geller	1960	USA
The Westerner / Going Home		Elliot Silverstein	1960	USA
The Westerner / Hand On The Gun		Sam Peckinpah	1960	USA
The Westerner / Jeff		Sam Peckinpah	1960	USA
The Westerner / Mrs. Kennedy		Bernard L. Kowalski	1960	USA
The Westerner / School Day		Andre de Toth	1960	USA
The Westerner / The Courting Of Libby		Sam Peckinpah	1960	USA
The Westerner / The Line Camp		Tom Gries	1960	USA
The Westerner / The Old Man		Andre de Toth	1960	USA
The Westerner / The Painting		Sam Peckinpah	1960	USA
The Westerner / The Treasure		Ted Post	1960	USA
Tombstone Territory / Johnny Ringo'S Last Ride		Ted Post	1958	USA
Zane Grey Theater / Lonesome Road		Sam Peckinpah	1959	USA
Zane Grey Theater / Trouble At Tres Cruces		Sam Peckinpah	1959	USA
Sam Peckinpah: TV Series 1
The Rifleman		Arnold Laven, Sam Peckinpah		USA
The Westerner		Andre de Toth, Bruce Geller, Tom Gries, Bernard L. Kowalski, Donald McDougall, Sam Peckinpah, Ted Post, Elliot Silverstein	1960	USA

=== The Films of the Juries ===
The following films were screened in the Films of the Juries section:

Filmmakers of the Present Jury
Original Title	English Title	Director(s)	Year	Production Country
Freddy Buache - Le Cinéma	Freddy Buache - Cinema	Fabrice Aragno	2012	Switzerland
L'Invisible		Fabrice Aragno	2015	Switzerland
L'Ombre Des Femmes	In the Shadow of Women	Philippe Garrel	2015	France
Love Is Strange		Ira Sachs	2014	USA
Unrelated		Joanna Hogg	2007	Great Britain
International Competition Jury
Haganenet	The Kindergarten Teacher	Nadav Lapid	2014	Israel
Lama?		Nadav Lapid	2014	Israel
Oasiseu	Oasis	Lee Chang-dong	2002	South Korea
Scarecrow		Jerry Schatzberg	1973	USA
The Forbidden Room		Evan Johnson, Guy Maddin	2015	Canada
Yeo-Bae-U		MOON So-ri	2014	South Korea
Leopards of Tomorrow Jury
Cherry Pie		Lorenz Merz	2013	Switzerland
Majki	Mothers	Milcho Manchevski	2010	Macedonia
Paulina		Santiago Mitre	2015	Argentina
Strannye Chasticy	Strange Particles	Denis Klebleev	2014	Russia
Un Día Y Nada	One Day and Nothing	Lorenz Merz	2008	Switzerland
Vergine Giurata	Sworn Virgin	Laura Bispuri	2015	Italia

== Independent Sections ==
=== Critics Week ===
The Semaine de la Critique is an independent section, created in 1990 by the Swiss Association of Film Journalists in partnership with the Locarno Film Festival. The following films were screened in the Semaine de la Critique section:

Original Title	English Title	Director(s)	Production Country
Als Die Sonne Vom Himmel Fiel	When the Sun Fell from the Sky	Aya Domenig	Switzerland
Bracia	Brethren	Wojciech Staroń	Poland
K2. Touching The Sky		Eliza Kubarska	Poland
Lampedusa In Winter		Jakob Brossmann	Austria
My Name Is Gary		Frédéric Cousseau, Blandine Huk	France
Mów Mi Marianna	Tell Me Marianna	Karolina Bielawska	Poland
The Ground We Won		Christopher Pryor	New Zealand

=== Panorama Swiss ===
The following films were screened in the Panorama Swiss section:

Swiss Panorama
Original Title	English Title	Director(s)	Year	Production Country
Above And Below		Nicolas Steiner	2015	Switzerland
Chrieg	War	Simon Jaquemet	2014	Switzerland
Cyclique	Cyclic	Frédéric Favre	2015	Switzerland
Dora Oder Die Sexuellen Neurosen Unserer Eltern	Dora or the Sexual Neuroses of Our Parents	Stina Werenfels	2015	Switzerland
Grozny Blues		Nicola Bellucci	2015	Switzerland
Horizontes	Horizons	Eileen Hofer	2015	Switzerland
Imagine Waking Up Tomorrow And All Music Has Disappeared		Stefan Schwieter	2015	Switzerland
Messages Dans L'Air	Messages in the Air	Isabelle Favez	2015	Switzerland
Nuvem Negra	Black Cloud	Basil Da Cunha	2014	Switzerland
Vecchi Pazzi	Old Crazy	Sabine Boss	2015	Switzerland
Wild Women: Gentle Beasts		Anka Schmid	2015	Switzerland
Wintergast		Matthias Guenter, Andy Herzog	2015	Switzerland

== Official Awards ==
=== International Competition (Concorso Internazionale) ===
- Golden Leopard (Pardo d'oro): Right Now, Wrong Then directed by Hong Sangsoo, South Korea
- Premio speciale della giuria (Special Jury Prize): Tikkun directed by Avishai Sivan, Israel
- Pardo per la miglior regia (Best direction): Andrzej Zulawski for Cosmos, France/Portugal
- Pardo per la miglior interpretazione femminile (Best actress): Tanaka Sachie, Kikuchi Hazuki, Mihara Maiko, Kawamura Rira in Happy Hour directed by Hamaguchi Ryusuke, Japan
- Pardo per la miglior interpretazione maschile (Best actor): Jung Jae-Young in Right Now, Wrong Then directed by Hong Sangsoo, South Korea
- Special Mention: For the script of Happy Hour directed by Hamaguchi Ryusuke; For the cinematography by Shai Goldman for Tikkun directed by Avishai Sivan

=== Filmmakers of the Present Competition (Concorso Cineasti del presente) ===
- Pardo d'oro Cineasti del presente – Premio Nescens: Thithi directed by Raam Reddy, India/USA/Canada
- Premio speciale della giuria Ciné+ Cineasti del presente (Special Jury prize): Dead Slow Ahead directed by Mauro Herce, Spain/France
- Premio per il miglior regista emergente (Prize for the best emerging director): Lu Bian Ye Can (Kaili Blues) directed by BI Gan, China

=== First Feature ===
- Swatch First Feature Award (Prize for Best First Feature): Thithi directed by Raam Reddy, India/USA/Canada
- Swatch Art Peace Hotel Award: Sina Ataeian Dena for MA DAR BEHESHT (Paradise), Iran/Germany
- Special Mentions: Lu Bian Ye Can (Kaili Blues) directed by Bi Gan, China, Kiev/Moscow. Part 1 directed by Elena Khoreva, Russia/Estonia/Ukraine

=== Pardi di domaniConcorso internazionale ===
- Pardino d'oro per il miglior cortometraggio internazionale – Premio SRG SSR: Mama directed by Davit Pirtskhalava, Georgia
- Pardino d'argento SRG SSR per il Concorso internazionale: La Impresión De Una Guerra directed by Camilo Restrepo, France/Colombia
- Locarno Nomination for the European Film Awards – Premio Pianifica: Fils Du Loup directed by Lola Quivoron, France
- Premio Film und Video Untertitelung: Mama directed by Davit Pirtskhalava, Georgia
- Special Mention: Nueva Vida directed by Kiro Russo, Argentina/Bolivia

=== Pardi di domaniConcorso nazionale ===
- Pardino d'oro per il miglior cortometraggio svizzero – Premio Swiss Life: Le Barrage directed by Samuel Grandchamp, Switzerland/USA
- Pardino d'argento Swiss Life per il Concorso nazionale: DOmbres Et DAiles directed by Eleonora Marinoni, Elice Meng, Switzerland/France
- Best Swiss Newcomer Award: Les Monts S'Embrasent directed by Laura Morales, Switzerland

=== Piazza Grande ===
- Prix du Public UBS: Der Staat Gegen Fritz Bauer directed by Lars Kraume, Germany
- Variety Piazza Grande Award: La Belle Saison directed by Catherine Corsini, France
