= Cordoba African Film Festival 2012 =

The Cordoba African Film Festival (also known as FCAT Cordoba) celebrated its ninth edition during 13–20 October 2012. The earlier eight editions were held in Tarifa. The ninth edition was hosted at Cordoba, a municipality located in Andalusia, Spain. The festival held over eight days was dedicated to cinema from 28 African and Middle East countries.

== Córdoba African Film Festival 2012 ==
=== Competitive sections ===
==== The African Dream ====
- 678, by Mohamed Diab (Egypt/Rwanda, 2011, 100’)

Based on the true story of three women and their struggle to defend themselves from the constant sexual harassment women have to deal with in Egypt. When one of them decides to take action and sticks a knife into her attackers’ groin, she becomes an anonymous heroine, revolutionizing the city.

- Matière Grise, by Kivu Ruhorahoza (Rwanda, 2011, 100’)

This film-within-a-film, set in the Rwandan capital of Kigali, follows the futile attempts of a determined filmmaker to fund his first feature, The Cycle of the Cockroach, a haunting drama about a brother and sister in the aftermath of genocide. The government refuses to finance his film but the filmmaker, Balthazar, hides the bad news from his team and continues prepping. Can this film exist only in his dreams? Matière Grise (Grey Matter) is one of Rwanda's first feature-length narrative films.

- Skoonheid, by Olivier Hermanus (South Africa, 2011, 99’)

François van Heerden, in his forties, lives a neat, orderly life in Bloemfontein, South Africa. The father of two children and a devoted husband, he does not know how to react to a fortuitous encounter that threatens his monotonous existence. It all happens on his daughter's wedding day. He cannot tear his eyes away from the son of one of his old friends. The attraction soon becomes an obsession.

- Sur la planche, by Leila Kilani (Morocco, 2001, 110’)

"I don’t steal, I just reimburse myself. I don’t traffic, I trade. I don’t lie, I’m already what I will be. I’m already ahead of reality, of my reality." In Tangiers, Badia struggles to get away from her job at the shrimp canning factory. Together with Imane, Nawal and Asma, her companions in misfortune, she lives at a frenetic pace, working by day and pulling fast ones by night, with all the freedom and energy of those who will not give up.

- El Taaib, by Merzak Allouache (Algeria, 2012, 110’)

Algeria, region of the high flatlands. As Islamist groups continue to spread terror, Rashid, a young Jihadist, leaves the mountains to return to his village. In keeping with the law “of pardon and national harmony”, he has to surrender to the police and give up his weapon. He thus receives amnesty and becomes a “repentant”. But the law cannot erase his crimes and for Rachid, it is the beginning of a one-way journey of violence, secrets and manipulation.

- Tey, by Alain Gomis (Senegal, 2011, 86’)

Today is the last day of Satché's life. He knows this to be true even though he is strong and healthy. Nonetheless, Satché accepts his imminent death. He walks through the streets of his hometown, goes to the decisive places of his past: his parents’ house, his first love, the friends of his youth... It is a way for an exile who has returned to get to know his homeland again.

- Virgin Margarida, by Licínio Azevedo (Mozambique, 2012, 90’)

Mozambique, 1975. The revolutionary government wants to eradicate all the traces of the colonialism and swiftly! One of which is prostitution. So all the prostitutes are taken from all the towns and taken to the most isolated forest of the country where they will be reeducated and transformed in new women, under the watch of the guerrilla women warriors. Amongst the 500 whores placed in these reeducation centers is Margarida, a 14-year-old peasant who was in town to buy her bridal trousseau. For not having her identification documents, Margarida is taken by mistake. In the reeducation center a revelation occurs that will change everything: Margarida is a virgin. Treated with kindness she becomes the whores’ protégé and they start to worship her as a saint.

==== On the Other Side of the Straits ====
- Bîr d'Eau, a Walkmovie, by Djamil Beloucif (Algeria, 2012, 77’)

Bîr d’Eau, a Walkmovie offers us a day in a street of Algiers during which a film is made and unmade under the camera's eye. The director gives the floor to the inhabitants of Bîr d’Eau Street, in the Telemly neighborhood.

- The Education of Auma Obama, by Branwen Okpako (Kenya, 2011, 79’)

The Education of Auma Obama is a documentary on the life and times of Barack Obama's half-sister told from her homestead in Kenya during the run up to the 2008 US Presidential elections. Auma embodies a post-colonial, feminist identity in her native Kenya. The film also documents a generation of politically and socially engaged Africans whose aspirations are formed by their parents’ experiences, and whose ambition to forge a better future starts from building from the ground up.

- Espoir-Voyage, by Michel K. Zongo (Burkina Faso, 2012, 81’)

Michel K. Zongo leaves Burkina Faso on the trail of his elder brother who emigrated to the Côte d'Ivoire when the filmmaker was only 5. His brother died there in 1994 after 18 years away. But the road that follows the trail of this absent brother is long, the witnesses unsure, their memories already distant. But his journey resounds in the words of other exiles.

- Gangster Project, by Teboho Edkins (South Africa, 2011, 55’)

In Cape Town, one of the world's most violent and unequal societies, a young white film student wants to make a gangster film, with real gangsters. After a lengthy search for a suitably ‘cinematic’ character, he finds the perfect gang and settles into their everyday rhythm. Reality soon catches up; fear, mourning, boredom and petty dealings are a distant cry from the expected flamboyant figures. A film between fiction and reality, where real truths are revealed and fiction stops being fiction.

- Ici, on noie les Algériens, by Yasmina Adi (Algeria, 2011, 90’)

In response to the call of the National Liberation Front, thousands of Algerians from Paris and its suburbs march to protest against the curfew imposed on them on October 17, 1961. Fifty years later, the filmmaker sheds light on the events of the day. Blending testimonies and previously unseen stock footage, the film retraces the events of that day and reveals the strategy and the outrageous methods applied at the highest levels by the French state.

- Laïcité Inch’-Allah, by Nadia El Fani (Tunisia, 2011, 72’)

August 2010. In full Ramadan under Ben Ali's regime, and despite the severity of censorship, Nadia El Fani films a country (Tunisia) that is apparently open to the principle of freedom of conscience and its relationship with Islam... Three months later, when the Tunisian Revolution breaks out, Nadia is out in the field. While the Arab world faces a radical change, Tunisia, after having set light to the sparks to the revolution, is once more the "lab" country as regards its view of religion. And if, just this once, by the people's will, a Muslim country were to choose a secular constitution? Then we could say that Tunisians truly carried out "The Revolution".

- The Virgin, the Copts and Me, by Namir Abdel Messeeh (Egypt, 2011, 85’)

One day Namir Abdel Messeeh, a filmmaker of Egyptian origin, watches a videotape of the Virgin Mary's apparition in Egypt with his mother. Like millions of other Copts, she sees the Virgin on the screen while he sees nothing. Skeptical about the videotape, Namir travels back to Egypt to make a film about these apparitions but he soon discovers plenty of obstacles. The result is a humorous fictional documentary and family-drama-cum-culture-clash about religion in the Diaspora, the art of cinema and the boundless creativity of filmmakers.

==== Africa in Short ====
- As they say, by Hicham Ayouch (Morocco, 2011, 14')

A father and a son spend the weekend fishing on the banks of a magical lake set against the lush sceneries of the Moroccan Rif. The son is a modern 25-year-old man who hopes to profit from these moments of intimacy and contemplation with his father to tell him his secret. The father, a traditionalist former serviceman, 60 years old, has no inkling as to what it is about. The revelation will destroy their relationship.

- Brûleurs, by Farid Bentoumi (Algeria, 2011, 15')

Amine, a young Algerian man, buys a video camera at a store in Oran and uses it to start recording his city, his house and, finally, his girlfriend and mother. He boards a boat with Malik, Lofti, Mohammad and Khalil to cross the Mediterranean. Camera in hand, Amine films the wake of their voyage.

- Demain Alger?, by Amini Sidi-Boumediène (Algeria, 2011, 20')

Three young people speak in front of a building. Their conversation, which soon turns into an argument, swivels around the imminent departure of a friend. In an apartment above them, Fouad packs his bags in silence while his mother watches him, her eyes shining with tears. He hesitates, not sure whether to say goodbye to his friends, who are still waiting for him in the parking lot. Fouad speaks with his father about his return, “one day”, to a city, Algiers, that he will probably not recognize.

- Kaa el bir, by Moez Ben Hassen (Tunisia, 2011, 20')

Drowning in desperation, Lofti is considering suicide. However, before he is able to turn thoughts into action, he has a terrible nightmare in which he sees the person he loves most in the world, his mother, Khadija, suffering the consequences of his terrible decision. The moral suffering and the feeling of guilt become unbearable, up until the point where they surpass his abysm of despair, making him rethink what he thought would be his liberation.

- Mkhobii fi Kobba, by Leyla Bouzid (Tunisia, 2011, 22')

In the homes of the Tunisian bourgeoisie when a dramatic event occurs, everything is done to hide it. A girl comes home with her face covered in blood, she has been attacked. Her mother and brother help her but at the same time make her feel guilty. Her father is kept in the dark. Grief and pity will lead the mother once and for all to take her daughter's side.

- Sur la route du paradis, by Uda Benyamina (Morocco, 2012, 43')

Leila and her two children, Sarah and Bilal, left their native land to settle down in France. Illegal immigrant, in search of her husband who refuged to England, Leila wishes to offer to her children a better life and tries to survive by raising them in the clandestinity. While she finds finally track of her husband and has the necessary money to join him, the vice tightens.

- Thato, by Teboho Edkins (South Africa, 2011, 28')

Portrait of a pregnant South African woman expecting her second child. Throughout the entire film, her face betrays her fear of the baby succumbing to AIDS like her first-born. From frantic hope to redemptive tears, her emotions are similar to the landscape featured in the film, evolving with the seasons - a metaphor of the destiny of a continent undergoing a profound change.

- Yvette, by Marie Bassolé/Ferdinand Bassono (Burkina Faso, 2011, 21')

Yvette, or the reality of a woman in the village of Perkouan (Burkina Faso), which we will discover while she is at her daily chores, in her environment and her thoughts...

- Who Killed Me, by Amil Shivji (Tanzania, 2011, 15')

Who Killed Me offers a glimpse in to the life of a lower class Congolese immigrant in Toronto before, during and after he is shot and murdered outside his workplace. From his mother to the police officer who finds him, we see different lives in the same city

=== Non-competitive sections ===
==== Afroscope ====
- Amanar Tamasheq, by Lluís Escartín (Spain, 2010)
- Dimanche à Brazzaville, by Enric Bach / Adriá Monés (Spain 2011)
- Ensayo final para utopía, by Andrés Duque (Spain, 2012)
- L'Identité Nationale, by Valérie Osouf (France, 2012)
- Kinyarwanda, by Alrick Brown (USA, 2010)
- Otra noche en la tierra, by David Muñoz (Spain, 2010)
- Los pasos dobles, by Isaki Lacuesta (Spain, 2011)
- Témoignages de l’autre côté, by Estrella Sendra (Spain, 2012)
- Tibayou Garmi, by Octavi Royo (Spain, 2010)
- Vol spécial, by Fernand Melgar (Switzerland, 2011)

==== Africa in Rhythm ====
- Africa: The beat, by Samaki Wanne (Spain, 2011)
- Mama África, by Mika Kaurismäki (South Africa, 2011)
- El gusto, by Safinez Bousbia (Algeria, 2011)

==== Panarábica ====
- Al-Hayat Al Yawmiyya Fi Qariya Suriyya, by Omar Amiralay (Syria, 1974)
- Recycle, by Mahmoud al Massad (Jordan/Netherlands, 2007)
- Sector Zero, by Nadim Mishlawi (United Arab Emirates/Lebanon, 2011)
- Tufan Fi Balad Al-Baath, by Omar Amiralay (Syria/France 2003)
- Yamo, by Rami Nihawi (Lebanon, 2011)

==== Animáfrica ====
- Tengers, by Michael J. Rix (South Africa, 2007)
- El viaje de Saïd, by Coke Riobóo (Spain, 2006)
- Give me spray, by Abd El-Gawad (Egypt)
- Honayn's Shoe, by Mohamed Ghazala (Egypt 2009)
- Humburgun, by Ahmad Salah Belal (Egypt, 2009)
- J'ai bu du café dans un café, by Saïd Bouftass (Morocco, 2005)
- L'enfant roi, by Mohamed Houssine Grayaâ (Tunisia, 2009)
- L'ami y'a bon, by Rachid Bouchareb (France 2004)
- Les aventures de Guéde, by Idrissa Diabaté (Côte d'Ivoire/France, 1999)
- Madagascar, carnet de voyage, by Bastien Dubois (France, 2010)
- Kokoa, by Moustapha Alassane (Níger/France, 2001)
- Sacou wala boutel, by Ibrahima Niang alias Piniang (Senegal, 2005)
- The tale of how, by Blackheart Gang (South Africa, 2006)
- Trip, by Nisren Abasher/Anne-Lisa Lippolbt (Germany/ Sudan 2008)
- Varavarankely, by Sitraka Randriamahaly (Madagascar, 2010)

=== Retrospectives ===
==== Algeria, 50 years of History and Cinema ====
- Abna al-rih, by Brahim Tsaki (Algeria, 1980)
- Bab El Web, by Merzak Allouache (Algeria/France/Alemania/Switzerland, 1994)
- Les baies d'Alger, by Hassen Ferhani (Algeria/France 2006)
- Barakat!, by Djamila Sahraou (Algeria/France, 2005)
- La Chine est encore loin, by Malek Bensmaïl (Algeria/France, 2008)
- Dans le silence, je sens rouler la terre, by Mohamed Lakhdar Tati (Algeria/France, 2010)
- Omar Gatlato, by Merzak Allouache (Algeria, 1976)
- Rachida, by Yamina Bachir Chouikh (Algeria/France, 2001)
- Tahia ya Didou, by Mohamed Zinet (Algeria, 1971)
- Youcef ou la légende du septième dormant, by Mohamed Chouikh (Algeria/France, 1993)

==== Cinema and Metropolis ====
- A Karim na Sala, by Idrissa Ouedraogo (Burkina Faso/France/Switzerland, 1991)
- Bab al-Hadid, by Youssef Chahine (Egypt, 1958)
- Borom Sarret, by Ousmane Sembène (Senegal/France, 1963)
- Bye Bye Africa, by Mahamat-Saleh Haroun (France/Chad, 1999)
- Come back Africa, by Lionel Rogosin (South Africa/USA, 1959)
- Contras'city, by Djibril Diop Mambéty (Senegal, 1968)
- L’Esprit de Mopti, by Moussa Ouane (Mali/France, 1999)
- Hospedes da Noite, by Licinio Azevedo (Mozambique/Portugal, 2007)
- Macadam Tribu, by Zeka Laplaine (Democratic Republic of the Congo/Portugal/France, 1996)
- Moi, un noir, by Jean Rouch (France, 1958)
- Na cidade vazia, by Maria João Ganga (Angola/Portugal/France, 2004)
- Roma Wa La N’Touma, by Tariq Teguia (Algeria/France/Alemania, 2006)
- Sea Point Days, by François Verster (South Africa, 2009)
- Un Transport en Commun, by Dyana Gaye (Senegal/France, 2009)
- Trésors des poubelles, by Samba Félix Ndiaye (Senegal, 1989)
- Triomf, by Michael Raeburn (South Africa/France, 2008)
- Udju Azul di Yonta, by Flora Gomes (Guinea-Bissau/Portugal/France, 1992)
- La vie est belle, by Mweze Ngangura/Benoît Lamy (Democratic Republic of the Congo/France/Belgium, 1987)
- Viva Riva!, by Djo Tunda Wa Munga (Democratic Republic of the Congo, 2010)
- www.What a wonderful world, by Faouzi Bensaïdi (Morocco/France/Germany, 2006)

==== Abderrahmane Sissako’s Little Film Library ====
- Todos nos llamamos Alí, by Rainer Werner Fassbinder (Federal Republic of Germany, 1974)
- La infancia de Iván, by Andrei Tarkovsky (Soviet Union, 1962)
- The kid, by Charles Chaplin (USA, 1921)
- Le llamaban Trinidad, by Enzo Barboni (Italy, 1970)
- Le Retour d'un aventurier, by Moustapha Alassane (Niger, 1966)

=== Special Sessions ===
==== FICiP Selection ====
- Fuego sobre el Mármara, by David Segarra Soler (Venezuela, 2011)
- Les invisibles, by Ishtar Yasin (Costa Rica/Haiti, 2010)

==== Tribute to Chris Marker ====
- Les statues meurent aussi, by Chris Marker (France, 1953)

=== Awards ===
- Griot for Best Feature Film: Tey, by Alain Gomis
- Griot for Best Director: Matière Grise, by Kivu Ruhorahoza
- Griot for Best Female Actor: Soufia Issami for her rôle ins Sur la Planche
- Griot for Best Male Actor: Saul Williams for his rôle in Tey
- Griot for Best Documentary: Gangster Project by Teboho Edkins.
  - Honorable Mention: Bîr d’eau, a walkmovie by Djamil Beloucif.
- Best Short Film: Sur la route du paradis by Uda Benyamina.
  - Honorable Mention: Brûleurs, by Farid Bentoumi.
- Young Jury Award for Best Short Film: Kaa El Bir, by Moez Ben Hassen
- Audience Award: 678 by Mohamed Diab
- SIGNIS Award: Matière grisse by Kivu Ruhorahoza.
  - Honorable Mention: Sur la planche by Leila Kilani.
- ASFAAN (Andalusia Audiovisual Festivals Association) honorary prize for an African director movie-making career: Merzak Allouache.
- ASECAN (Andalusia Cinema Writers Association) critic honorary prize for the best fiction feature film: Skoonheid by Olivier Hermanus.
- Cordoba Ciudad Solidaria (Cordoba Solidarity City) Award: Vol spécial by Fernand Melgar.
  - Honorable Mention: Hospedes da noite by Licinio Azevedo.

=== Juries ===
==== The African dream ====
- Sylvia Perel
- Tanya Valette
- Caroline Kamya

==== On the Other Side of the Straits ====
- Andrés Duque
- Ishtar Yasin Gutiérrez
- Samir Ardjoum

==== Special juries ====
- ASECAN (Andalusia Cinema Writers Association) Jury
  - Guillermo Rojas Rivadulla
  - Manuel Ángel Jiménez Arévalo
  - Michèle Solle
- SIGNIS Jury
  - Guido Convents
- Córdoba Ciudad Solidaria (Cordoba Solidarity City) Award Jury
  - Consuelo Serrano (Cruz Roja)
  - Jesús García (Asociación Andaluza por la Solidaridad y la Paz)
  - José Santofimia (KASUMAY)
  - Pablo Blanco (Grupo JAIMA)
  - Iván Barrón (ELMAT)
- Young Jury
