= Mano Film =

Swiss film production company

- Formerly: Mano Produktion
- Industry: film, art, cinema
- Founded: 1987 (Mano Produktion), 2001 (Mano Film) in Zürich, Switzerland
- Founder: Anka Schmid, Rachel Schmid, Agnes Barmettler
- Headquarters: Zürich, Switzerland
- Owner: Anka Schmid (since 2001)
- Website: www.ankaschmid.ch

Mano Film (formerly Mano Produktion) is a Swiss film production company located in Zürich, Switzerland. It was founded in 1987 by Anka Schmid, Agnes Barmettler and Rachel Schmid and produced several feature films. In 2001 Anka Schmid became the sole proprietress. The production company has since specialized in producing interdisciplinary film and art projects.

== Film and art projects ==
- 2016: La Dada – King Deer (short film)
- 2014: Sophie tanzt trotzdem (video installation)
- 2013: Fe-Male (short film, video installation)
- 2012: Marzili Badi (experimental video)
- 2011: Wasserballett (art video, room installation)
- 2011: Mäusemuseum (short documentary)
- 2011: Musée Bizarre (portrait of a museum)
- 2010: TV-Stube (art video)
- 2008: Hierig – Heutig (art installation, short film)
- 2006: Found Footage I–XI (art videos, installations, interventions)
- 2004: Perpetuum Mobile (experimental video)
- 2002: Onoma (6 short films for Swiss Expo02)
- 2000: Das Engadiner Wunder (short film, art installation)
- 1997: Labyrinth-Projektionen (art video)
- 1998: Little Sister (portmanteau film, co-produced with Thelma Film, Zürich/Switzerland)
- 1994: Magic Matterhorn (feature documentary, co-produced with Insert Film, Solothurn/Switzerland)
- 1991: Behind Locked Doors (feature film, co-produced with the German Film and Television Academy Berlin)
- 1989: Techqua Ikachi, Land - My Life (feature documentary)
