= Ruz =

- Directed by: Gopalen Parthiben Chellapermal
- Screenplay by: Gopalen Parthiben Chellapermal
- Produced by: Caméléon Production
- Starring: Rajen Packiry Poullé Rolande Hungley Corinne Lallman-Sit Yee Joseph Wan Sui Cheung Sandy Murden
- Cinematography: David Constantin
- Edited by: David Constantin
- Music by: St Thomas José Friends & Mo’zar
- Release date: 2009
- Running time: 6 minutes
- Country: Mauritius
- Language: Mauritian Creole

Ruz (transl. Red) is a 2009 short film directed by Gopalen Parthiben Chellapermal. The short film participated in the Festival of African Cinema in 2009 and the Festival du court mirage in 2011.

== Synopsis ==
A family of mixed heritage sits down to eat. There is the grandmother of Creole origin, the grandfather of Tamil origin, their daughter, her husband of Chinese origin and their granddaughter, who is ten years old. Also present are the son of the elderly couple, his wife of Muslim origin and their son of seven years. The boy turns up all painted in red, stirring up social stereotypes that lead to a conversation concerning the coexistence of this family, ostensibly so proud of their mixed heritage.

== Release ==
The short film also premiered in Argentina.
