= Les Accords de Bella =

- DVD cover
- Directed by: David Constantin
- Screenplay by: David Constantin
- Produced by: Caméléon Production
- Cinematography: Mahen Bujun
- Edited by: David Constantin
- Music by: Menwar
- Release date: 2007
- Running time: 52 minutes
- Country: Mauritius
- Language: Rodriguan Creole

Les Accords de Bella (lit. 'Bella's Accords') is a 2007 anthropological documentary film directed by David Constantin. It was selected by the African Film Festival of Cordoba - FCAT.

== Synopsis ==
Rodrigues Island, lost in the middle of the Indian Ocean, has more than 500 accordions for a population of 35,000. Polkas, mazurkas and waltzes are part of the history and mestization of an island forgotten by all for a very long time. The accordion is not a forgotten instrument; its sound mixes with African drums so that young and old can dance. With Philippe Imbert's help, a French craftsman, the Rodrigues Accordion Association has set out on a new adventure: Making their own accordion. The first one, the prototype, completely made on the island, is called Bella.
