= Samba Félix Ndiaye =

Senegalese documentary filmmaker

Samba Félix N’diaye
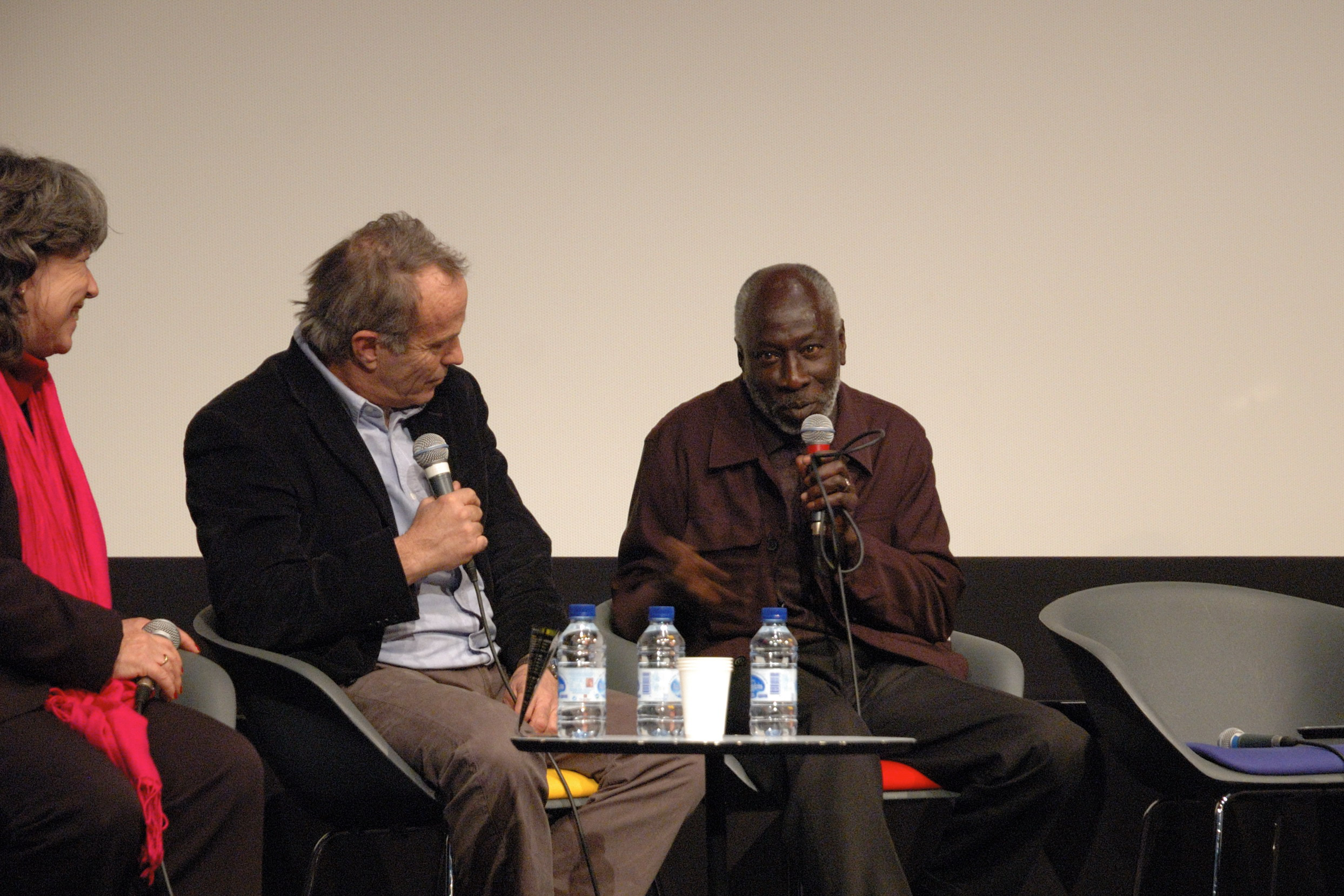
- Catherine Ruelle, François Belorgey et Samba Félix Ndiaye
- Born: Samba Félix N’diaye; 6 March 1945; Dakar, Sénégal
- Died: 6 November 2009 (aged 64); Dakar, Sénégal
- Resting place: Yoff cemetery
- Education: University of Dakar; University of Paris VIII; Institut Lumière
- Occupations: Director, writer, cinematographer
- Years active: 1974–2007

Samba Félix N’diaye (6 March 1945 – 6 November 2009), was a Sénégalese filmmaker. One of the early pillars in Senegalese cinema industry, Ndiaye is regarded as the father of the African documentary. He made several critically acclaimed Documentary shorts Trésors des poubelles, Ngor, l'esprit des lieux, Les malles and Geti Tey. Apart from direction, he is also a writer and cinematographer.

== Personal life ==
Ndiaye was born on 6 March 1945 in Dakar, Senegal. He regularly attended the film club of the French Cultural Center in Dakar which he done as a habit. He later training in law and economics at the University of Dakar. Then he attended the University of Paris VIII and obtained Masters in Cinema and Audiovisual Studies. Then he joined with the Institut Lumière to study cinematography and editing.

He died on 6 November 2009 in Dakar at the age of 64 due to complications from cerebral malaria. He was later buried in Yoff cemetery.

== Career ==
In 1974, he directed his maiden documentary short Perantal, as part of his master's degree in cinema. In 1978, he made the short Geti Tey which discussed the difficulties faced by artisanal fishermen from Kayar, Hann or Soumbédioune whose activity is endangered by the boom in fishing. After that, Ndiaye made the a series of five short films gathered under the title Trésors des poubelles in 1989. In the same year, he made the short Aqua, an “urban metonymy” which is almost without words.

In 1994, Ndiaye made his maiden feature film Ngor, l'esprit des lieux about the inhabitants of Ngor, a village located on the outskirts of Dakar. Since late 1990s, he mostly concerned about political thematic documentaries and made Lettre à Senghor in 1998. As a writer, he wrote the documentary Rwanda, pour mémoire which focused on the Rwandan genocide of 1994. In 2007 in his late years, Ndiaye made the documentary Questions à la terre natale. In 2012, he won the award at the Cordoba African Film Festival for his film Trésors des poubelles.

== Filmography ==
Year	Film	Role	Genre	Ref.
1974	Perantal	Director, writer, cinematographer, editor	Documentary short	
1976	La confrérie des Mourides	Director, writer, cinematographer, editor	Documentary short	
1977	Pêcheurs de Kayar	Director, writer, cinematographer, editor	Documentary short	
1978	Geti Tey	Director, cinematographer, producer	Documentary short	
1984	Xew Xew	Executive producer	Documentary	
1986	La santé, une aventure peu ordinaire	Director, writer, cinematographer, editor	Documentary short	
1989	Trésors des poubelles	Director, writer, cinematographer, editor	Documentary compilation	
1989	Teug, chaudronnerie d'art	Director, writer, cinematographer, editor	Documentary short	
1989	Les malles	Director, writer	Documentary short	
1989	Les chutes de Ngalam	Director, writer, cinematographer, editor	Documentary short	
1989	Diplomate à la tomate	Director, writer, cinematographer, editor	Documentary short	
1989	Aqua	Director, writer, cinematographer, editor	Documentary short	
1992	Dakar Bamako	Director	Documentary	
1992	Amadou Diallo, un peintre sous verre	Director, writer, editor	Documentary short	
1992	Hyena	Executive producer	Documentary	
1994	Ngor, l'esprit des lieux	Director, writer	Film	
1998	Lettre à Senghor	Director, writer	Documentary	
2001	Nataal	Director, writer, cinematographer, editor	Documentary	
2003	Rwanda, pour mémoire	writer	Documentary	
2007	Questions à la terre natale	Director	Documentary	
