= Wild Women =

Wild Women may refer to:

- Wild Women (1918 film), an American comedy western film
- Wild Women (1951 film), an American adventure film directed by Norman Dawn
- Wild Women (1970 film), an American television western film
- Wild Women (song), a single by Michael Learns to Rock

== See also ==
- Wild Women: Gentle Beasts, a 2015 feature documentary
