= List of Mauritian films =

This is an alphabetical list of films produced in Mauritius.

== A ==
- A Lucy (1993)

== B ==
- Benares (2004)
- Bikhre Sapne (1975)
- Blue Penny (2023)

== C ==
- C'est la vie (2003)
- Conversations at Sea (1981)

== D ==
- Documentary on MGI (1990)

== E ==
- Elections generales (1982)
- Environmental and Geographical Studies of Mauritius (1986)
- Et le sourire revient (1980)

== F ==
- Film on Stress (1990)
- Frames of Reference (2001) (TV)

== G ==
- Goodbye My Love (1986)

== I ==
- Ik banjara (1978)
- Immigrés en France (1982)
- Invitation au voyage (1990)
- Île Maurice, enn novo sime (1983)
- Île Maurice, perle de l'océan indien (1973)

== L ==
- L'argile et la flamme (1981)
- L'eduction (1987)
- L'embarrass du choix (1972)
- L'habitat (1978)
- La Cathédrale (2006)
- La Charrette (1977)
- La Memoire Maritime des Arabes, France, Oman, Ile Maurice, par Khal Torabully
- Le Cavadée à l'île Maurice (1990)
- Le Portrait d'un chef d'état (1982)
- Le Rêve de Rico (2001)
- Le Séga à l'île Maurice (1990)
- Lonbraz Kann, directed by David Constantin, Mauritius/Réunion Island/France (2014)
- Lockdown in Mauritius, directed by Khem Ramphul (2020)

== M ==
- Maîtres de leur destinée (1978)
- Malcolm le tailleur des visions, France-Ile Maurice, par Khal Torabully
- Mr Sujeewon, The Daredevil (2014)

== N ==
- Nés de la mer (1988)

== O ==
- Objectif energie (1983)
- Objectif energie (1987)

== P ==
- Pic Pic, nomade d'une Ile, ZIFF Award, par Khal Torabully

== S ==
- Sarl (1986)

== T ==
- Tara (1978)
- Trou d'eau douce (1980)
