= David Constantin =

Mauritian filmmaker

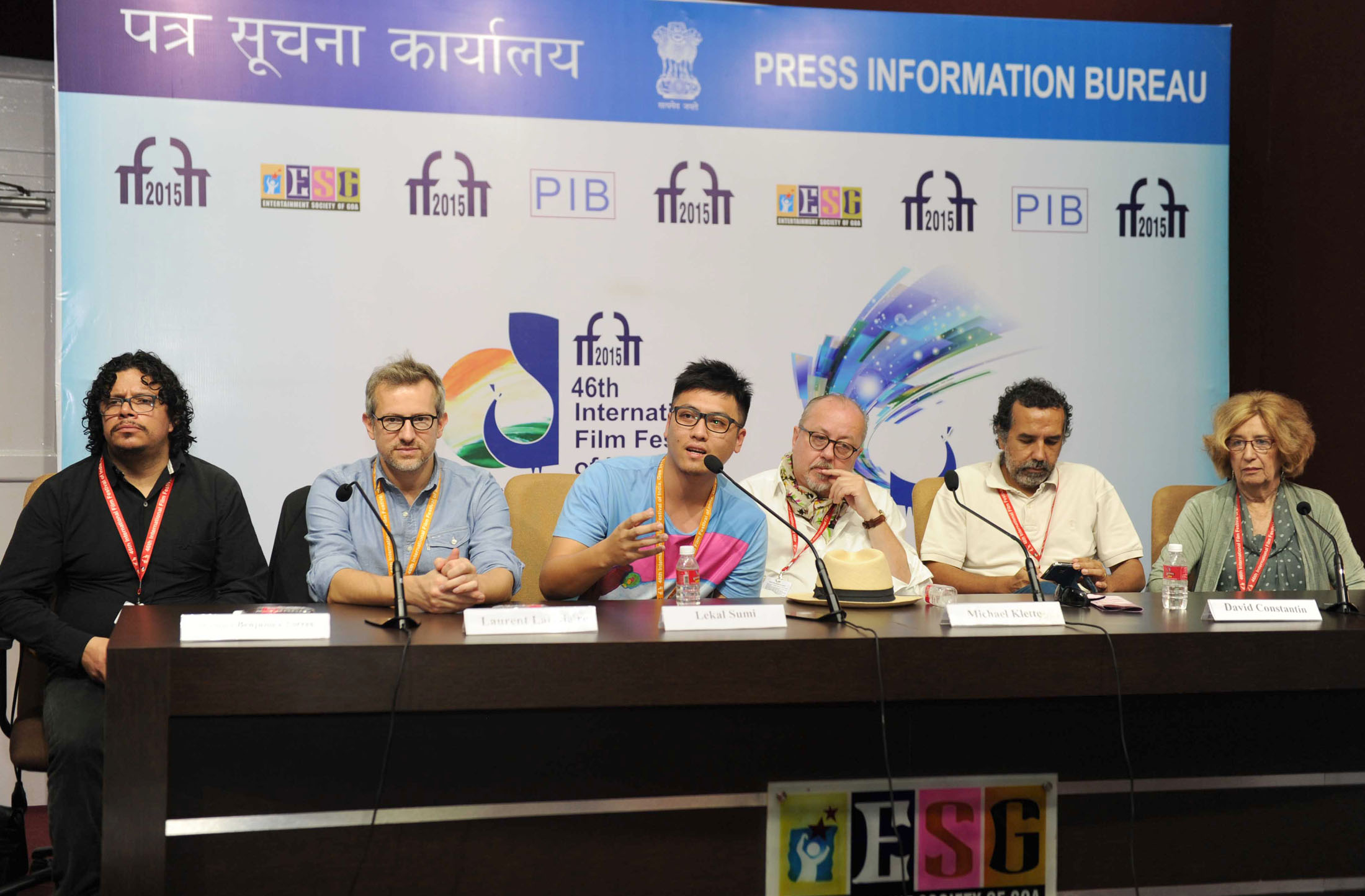
- David Constantin (right), IFFI (2015)
- Born: 26 July 1974 (age 51); Mauritius
- Occupation: Filmmaker
- Known for: Les Accords de Bella

David Constantin (born 1974) is a filmmaker from Mauritius.

== Career ==
Constantin was born in Mauritius Island in 1974. He obtained a degree in Information and Communication, and then attended the ESAV (Higher School of Audiovisuals) in Toulouse. He made his first short film in 1998. After spending five years in France studying cinematography he returned to Mauritius in 2002.

Constantin directed and produced the short film Diego l'interdite (Diego the Forbidden). This is a documentary about the deportation of the people of the Chagos Island in the Indian Ocean by the US and UK governments. The film won the European Grand Prix of First Films 2002 and Vues d'Afrique 2003. In the years that followed he directed and produced a number of documentaries and short films. He won awards in film festivals such as Vues d’Afrique (Montreal), Amiens (France), Réunion and Milan. His 2005 short Bisanville (l'Autobus) won prizes at the International Film Festival of Amiens in 2005 and the 12th Film Festival of Africa and the Islands, Reunion 2005. His short comedy Made In Mauritius was screened at the 2010 African Film Festival of Cordoba. It was also screened at the 22nd African, Asian and Latin American Film Festival in Milan in March 2012.

In 2007 he organized ILE COURTS, the first short film festival in Mauritius. David Constantin has established an audiovisual research laboratory at the Charles Baudelaire Cultural Centre. He gives introductory courses for teachers on analysis of the image. He has given seminars on aspects of film for the Université populaire de l'Ile Maurice.

== Filmography ==
Year	Title	Role	Notes
2002	Diego l'interdite (Diego the forbidden)	Director, producer, screenwriter	52 minutes. Islanders were evicted to make way for the Diego Garcia naval base
2003	Colas	Director	15 minutes. Short fiction.
2005	Bisanvil (l'Autobus)	Director	13 minutes. Portrait of Mauritian people on a bus journey
2007	Les Accords de Bella	Director, screenplay, editor	52 minutes. Documentary about accordions on Rodrigues Island
2009	Made In Mauritius	Director, screenwriter	7 minutes. Short comedy
2009	Ruz	Cinematography, editor	6 minutes. Directed by Gopalen Parthiben Chellapermal
2012	Dibut Lor Nu Lipié	Director, screenplay	Documentary on poverty eradication in Mauritius
2014	Lonbraz Kann	Director, producer, Co-screenwriter	1hr 28 minutes. Drama
