= Lonbraz Kann =

2014 Mauritian film

- Film poster
- Directed by: David Constantin
- Screenplay by: Sabrina Compeyron; David Constantin
- Produced by: Fred Eyriey
- Starring: Danny Bhowaneedin; Raj Bumma; Nalini Aubeeluck; Jean Claude Catheya; Jérôme Boulle; Bernard Li Kwong Ken
- Cinematography: Sabine Lancelin
- Edited by: Morgane Spacagna
- Production companies: Caméléon Production; Lithops Films; Atopic
- Distributed by: Invesco
- Release date: October 2, 2014 (Festival international du film d'Afrique et des îles)
- Running time: 88 minutes
- Country: Mauritius
- Language: Mauritian Creole

Lonbraz Kann (also known as Sugarcane Shadows) is a 2014 Mauritian film directed by David Constantin.

== Plot ==
The story follows the closing of a sugar factory, and how it affects the local residents: the factory workers' houses are destroyed to make space for new up-scale residences, and foreign workers are brought in to help with that construction.

== Cast ==
- Danny Bhowaneedin as Marco
- Nalini Aubeeluck as Devi
- Raj Bumma as Bissoon

== Production ==
The film started in 2006 as a project called Sans Sucre at the Three Continents Festival's "Produire au Sud" workshop in Nantes in France. It participated in the 2010 Francophone Production Forum in Namur Film Festival. In 2012, the film was selected to participate in the Open Doors film lab run by the Locarno Festival. The production received 93,000 euros from ACPCulture+ and 40,000 euros from the International Organisation of the Francophonie, and the filmmakers made it a priority to hire local crew members and equipment before resorting to bringing in skilled people from Europe. The film was shot in November and December 2013 at actual construction sites in Mauritius. Constantin cast people with no prior acting experience because he wanted to find local residents who had life experiences that were related to the characters they were playing.

== Release ==
Lonbraz Kann premiered at the Festival international du film d'Afrique et des îles in Réunion on October 2, 2014. It also screened at several international festivals, including the Festival International du Film Francophone de Namur, Zanzibar International Film Festival, and Seattle International Film Festival.

== Reception ==
The film was awarded Best Screenplay at the 2015 Durban International Film Festival. It also won two awards at the 2015 Africa Movie Academy Awards: Achievement in Cinematography and Achievement in Sound.
