= Diego l'interdite =

- Directed by: David Constantin
- Screenplay by: David Constantin
- Produced by: Caméléon Production
- Cinematography: David Constantin; Jerôme Valin
- Edited by: David Constantin
- Release date: 2002
- Running time: 52 minutes
- Country: Mauritius
- Languages: Chagossian creole Mauritian Creole

Diego l'interdite is a Mauritian 2002 documentary film directed by David Constantin.

== Synopsis ==
This documentary tells of how the Chagossians were torn from their islands in the northern Indian Ocean. In 1965, the Colonial British authorities declared the isle separate from Mauritius in exchange of its independence. Then, the United States rented Diego Garcia, the largest of the isles, to install a military base and the population was sent to Mauritius. The Chagossians have spent the past 36 years living in extreme poverty in Mauritius, dreaming of one day going home.

== Awards ==
- Gran Premio Europeo de las Primeras Películas 2002
- Vues d’Afrique 2003
