= Thato =

Thato is a Sotho-Tswana name meaning "Love/ God's will." Notable people with the name include:

- Thato Brian Chilombo (born 1997)
- Thato Batshegi (born 1988), Motswana boxer
- Thato Lingwati (born 1992), South African soccer player
- Thato Mokeke (born 1989), South African soccer player
- Thato Rantao Mwosa, Motswana-American writer, director and illustrator
- Thato Saul (born 1995), South African musician
- Thato Sikwane (born 1972), Motswana disk jockey
- Thato Siska, Motswana footballer
- Thato Thinyane, Mosotho Human Rights Defender

== Surname ==
- Gloria Thato (born 1989), South African soccer player
