= The Pfister Siblings =

Swiss-German comedy band

Geschwister Pfister
- Origin: Berlin, Germany
- Genres: Comedy music; Big band
- Years active: 1990s–present
- Members: Tobias Bonn as Tony Pfister; Christopher Marti as Ursli Pfister; Andreja Schneider as Miss Schneider
- Past members: Max Gertsch as Will Pfister; Lilian Naef as Lilo Pfister
- Website: geschwister-pfister.de

The Pfister Siblings (German: Die Geschwister Pfister, lit. 'The Siblings Pfister') is a Swiss-German comedy band founded in Berlin in the early 1990s. Their music incorporates elements of folk, pop, bossa nova, vaudeville, swing, and yodeling. In 2022, Mannschraft Magazin described them as a "queer music cabaret trio."

== Formation ==
In the 1990s, actors Christopher Marti, Tobias Bonn, Max Gertsch, and Lilian Naef formed the group at the Schiller Theater. They created fictional personas as 4 orphan siblings from Zermatt, Switzerland.

== Music ==
In 2009, they released In The Clinic, which includes a cover of Esther & Abi Ofarim's 1968 novelty single, "Cinderella Rockefella," performed by two men. The album also includes an a cappella version of "Spider Pig," a brief song sung by Homer Simpson in 2007 film The Simpsons Movie, which in turn is a parody of the Spider-Man theme song.

== Awards and legacy ==
The group was awarded Berliner Kritikerpreis (transl. Berlin Critic's Prize) in 1992. In 1993, they won the Salzburger Stier Award, an annual award for "the best cabaret artists and satirists from German-speaking countries."

In 1995, they won the Prix Walo, a Swiss show business award sometimes referred to as a "Swiss Oscar."

They were portrayed in the 1995 documentary Magic Matterhorn.

In 2014, the group won the B.Z.-Kulturpreis.

The 2021 Historical Dictionary of Berlin names The Pfister Siblings as one of the city's most important performers.

In Spring 2022, the original four members reunited to perform again, for the first time in 30 years. The Berliner Morgenpost claimed it was "almost like ABBA."

In 2022, they were awarded the Swiss Culture Prize.

== See also ==
- Max Raabe and the Palast Orchester, a jazz big band in Berlin that recreates 1920s and 1930s big band music
