= Techqua Ikachi, Land - My Life =

Techqua Ikachi, Land – My Life
- Techqua Ikachi, Land - Mein Leben
- Directed by: Anka Schmid, Agnes Barmettler, James Danaqyumptewa
- Written by: Anka Schmid, Agnes Barmettler, James Danaqyumptewa
- Produced by: Mano Film
- Cinematography: Jürg Viktor Walter, Anka Schmid, James Danaqyumptewa
- Edited by: Inge Schneider, Anka Schmid
- Release date: 1989
- Running time: 89 / 102min
- Countries: Switzerland, Germany
- Language: Hopi

Techqua Ikachi, Land – My Life is a feature documentary by Swiss/German director Anka Schmid, the Swiss artist Agnes Barmettler and the Hopi Native American James Danaqyumptewa from 1989. The documentary shows the history and life of Native Americans of the Hopi tribe in Arizona, in particular their problems with the American government in their fight for sovereignty. It is being told from the perspective of the Hopi tribe.

== Summary ==
The documentary consists of current and historical shots alike and is being complemented by sketches and drawings of Swiss artist Agnes Barmettler. Explanatory commentary is being omitted deliberately, instead the shots are being strung together to a whole by the narration of eldest of Hótevilla, a village in Arizona. The eldest of the village pass on the history of their peoples, talking about the nonviolent resistance against the land expropriation at the beginning of the 20th century and about the American authorities’ paternalism, due to which the natives’ traditions and way of life are being suppressed. The images refer to the present day and put the narrative not only into the North American but the global context. The main theme of the film, the slow fading away of a whole culture, is of timeless importance.

== Background ==
About 1986/87 the then 70 year old Hopi Native American James Danaqyumptewa (alias Jimmy Kootshongsi, 1916-1996) invited the young film student Anka Schmid and the Swiss painter Agnes Barmettler to his Hopi-village in the United States in order for them to document the way of life, legends and traditions of the Hopi tribe. Schmid and Barmettler ended up staying for a whole year in the village of Hótevilla in Arizona.

== Festivals and awards ==
Techqua Ikachi was in the competition at Sundance Film Festival in Park City, Utah. It won the Cultural Award of the canton Solothurn and the Blue Ribbon Award of the Chicago International Film Festival.

=== Further festivals ===
- Dok Leipzig
- Cinéma du Réel Paris
- Dokfest Munich
- (former) Los Angeles Filmfest (now Los Angeles Asian Pacific Film Festival)
- Visions du Réel Nyon
- San Francisco International Film Festival
- Festival dei Popoli Florence

=== Further information ===
In 2006 Techqua Ikachi; Land – my Life / Land – mein Leben / Terre – ma vie was released in two versions (115 and 102 minutes) on DVD.
