= Right Now, Wrong Then =

2015 film by Hong Sang-soo

- Theatrical release poster
- Directed by: Hong Sang-soo
- Written by: Hong Sang-soo
- Produced by: Kim Kyoung-hee
- Starring: Jung Jae-young; Kim Min-hee; Youn Yuh-jung; Gi Ju-bong; Choi Hwa-jung; Yoo Jun-sang; Seo Young-hwa; Go Ah-sung
- Cinematography: Park Hong-yeol
- Edited by: Hahm Sung-won
- Music by: Jeong Yong-jin
- Production company: Jeonwonsa Films
- Distributed by: Next Entertainment World
- Release dates: 13 August 2015 (Locarno); 24 September 2015 (South Korea)
- Running time: 121 minutes
- Country: South Korea
- Language: Korean
- Box office: $680,728

Right Now, Wrong Then (Korean: 지금은 맞고 그때는 틀리다; RR: Jigeumeun matgo geuttaeneun teullida) is a 2015 South Korean arthouse romantic drama film written and directed by Hong Sang-soo. It won the Golden Leopard, the top prize at the 68th Locarno International Film Festival, as well as Best Actor for Jung Jae-young.

== Plot ==
=== Part 1. Right Then, Wrong Now ===
An arthouse film director, Ham Cheon-soo, travels to Suwon to screen one of his films. While walking around he spies a young, pretty girl. Seeing her a second time in a blessing hall in a temple he strikes up a conversation with her. Recognizing his name after he introduces himself she agrees to go with him to a coffee shop. There she talks about how she used to work as a model but found it empty and uninteresting despite making good money. She currently works as a painter. As he has arrived a day early and has nothing else to do, Cheon-soo goes with Yoon Heejung to her studio and watches her paint. Afterwards he takes her out for sushi and they get drunk on soju. Cheon-soo tells Heejung he appreciates her as a woman and the two flirt. Cheon-soo tells Heejung he likes her as a friend and then as more than a friend. He drunkenly digs through his pockets searching for a ring he can give her but Heejung becomes morose telling him that she doesn't have any friends. Cheon-soo goes out for a smoke and Heejung remembers that she has a small gathering to go to for her friend's birthday. She asks Cheon-soo to accompany her and he does.

The evening goes sour however when Heejung tells her friends how touched she was by the things that Cheon-soo told her about her painting in the gallery and her friend reveals that he has said many similar things in interviews. She also brings up his reputation as a womanizer and the fact that he is married, which he confirms. Heejung goes to lie down to sleep off being drunk. When Cheon-soo tries to approach her again she tells him to leave. Going home her mother berates her for being drunk.

At the screening the following day Cheon-soo is hung over and acts angry and erratic during the post-film discussion. A friend of Heejung's arrives and gives him a book of her own writing. Cheon-soo leaves to go back to Seoul.

=== Part 2. Right Now, Wrong Then ===
The day begins over again. Cheon-soo again goes to the temple where he sees Heejung and introduces himself. At the coffee shop he asks her about her life and she tells him she lives with her mother and never sees her father since he divorced her mother and moved to Seoul.

Cheon-soo goes to Heejung's atelier where he tells her that she paints with confidence but it seems like the painting was made for her alone. He tells her she needs to be bolder with her choices but that the quality of the painting is there. Heejung is outraged that he is so insulting about her painting. To escape her anger Cheon-soo goes out for a smoke. Heejung leads him to the rooftop where she points to where her home is.

At the sushi restaurant, Cheon-soo goes for a smoke earlier and then comes back. He tells Heejung she is beautiful and she asks if he is a womanizer. She then asks him why he had said that she seemed sad from her painting, and he tells her that she projects that aura. She confides in him that she has no friends and he tells her that it's alright, that's probably just the way she is. Cheon-soo then tells Heejung he loves her and wants to marry her but can't as he's married with two children. He begins to cry. Heejung tells him she feels sad and wishes they met at an earlier time. Cheon-soo gives her a ring that he found on the street and Heejung calls it their wedding ring. Heejung again invites him to meet her friends.

At the gathering her friends are more receptive and find Cheon-soo kind and unlike his reputation. Encouraged to drink by Heejung's friends he briefly passes out and plays it off as a bit of play-acting. He then begins drunkenly taking off his clothes, much to their alarm.

Cheon-soo goes to wake up Heejung and tells her he wants to leave. Though she is initially reluctant to do so for fear of what it will look like she eventually decides to go. Walking home she receives a call from her mother who asks her where she is and tells her that Cheon-soo stripped in front of her friends which she finds hilarious.

Cheon-soo walks her home but asks her to come back out so they can continue talking. Heejung promises to do so and gives him a kiss on the cheek before her mother comes out and she goes inside. Cheon-soo stays outside smoking hoping she will come out again before eventually giving up.

The screening for his film goes well and Cheon-soo stays outside talking with the moderator and an assistant director. Heejung comes out to speak with him and the two wish each other well before she heads back inside to see the rest of the film festival. Before leaving Cheon-soo goes back to the theatre to say goodbye to her and she tells him that she'll watch all of his films from now on.

== Cast ==
- Jung Jae-young as Ham Chun-su
- Kim Min-hee as Yoon Hee-jeong
- Youn Yuh-jung as Kang Deok-soo
- Gi Ju-bong as Kim Won-ho
- Choi Hwa-jung as Bang Soo-young
- Yoo Jun-sang as Ahn Seong-gook
- Seo Young-hwa as Joo Young-sil
- Go Ah-sung as Yeom Bo-ra

== Reception ==
=== Critical response ===
On the review aggregator website Rotten Tomatoes, the film holds an approval rating of 92% based on 49 reviews, with an average rating of 7.5/10. The website's critics consensus reads, "Right Now, Wrong Then offers diverging perspectives on a chance meeting – and thought-provoking observations on human interactions in general." Metacritic, which uses a weighted average, assigned the film a score of 81 out of 100, based on 16 critics, indicating "universal acclaim".

In 2020, The Guardian ranked it number six among the classics of modern South Korean Cinema.

=== Awards and nominations ===
Year	Award	Category	Recipient	Result
2015	68th Locarno International Film Festival	Golden Leopard	Right Now, Wrong Then	Won
2015	68th Locarno International Film Festival	Best Actor	Jung Jae-young	Won
2015	35th Korean Association of Film Critics Awards	Best Actor	Jung Jae-young	Won
2015	35th Korean Association of Film Critics Awards	Top 10 Films of the Year	Right Now, Wrong Then	Won
2015	36th Blue Dragon Film Awards	Best Actor	Jung Jae-young	Nominated
2015	9th Asia Pacific Screen Awards	Best Actor	Jung Jae-young	Won
2015	53rd Gijón International Film Festival	Best Film	Right Now, Wrong Then	Won
2015	53rd Gijón International Film Festival	Best Actor	Jung Jae-young	Won
2016	3rd Wildflower Film Awards	Best Director (Narrative Films)	Hong Sang-soo	Nominated
2016	3rd Wildflower Film Awards	Best Actor	Jung Jae-young	Won
2016	3rd Wildflower Film Awards	Best Actress	Kim Min-hee	Nominated
2016	3rd Wildflower Film Awards	Best Screenplay	Hong Sang-soo	Nominated
2016	21st Chunsa Film Art Awards	Best Actor	Jung Jae-young	Nominated
2016	21st Chunsa Film Art Awards	Best Actress	Kim Min-hee	Nominated
2016	16th Busan Film Critics Awards	Best Actress	Kim Min-hee	Won
2016	25th Buil Film Awards	Best Actor	Jung Jae-young	Nominated
2017	14th International Cinephile Society	Best Actor	Jung Jae-young	Nominated
