= Our Forbidden Places =

2008 French documentary film

- Directed by: Leïla Kilani
- Produced by: INA, Socco Chico
- Cinematography: Eric Devin, Benoît Chamaillard
- Edited by: Leïla Kilani, Tina Baz
- Release date: 2008
- Running time: 105 minutes
- Countries: France; Morocco

Our Forbidden Places (original French title:Nos lieux interdits) is a 2008 documentary film.

== Synopsis ==
In 2004, the King of Morocco launched an Equity and Reconciliation Commission to investigate state violence during the Years of Lead. For three years, the film follows four families in their search for the truth: Activist, young rebel soldier or simple citizen, either they or their relations were imprisoned in different parts of Morocco. Each person tries to "find out", discover a "reason", to be able to mourn. But forty years later, the state secret finally unveils the existence of another, more intimate secret, the family secret. They all feel the need to reconstruct history and recover their parents, taken from them twice over, once by their disappearance and another by the secret. Choosing between deeply set silences, lies and taboos within and outside the families, over forty years.

== Awards ==
- Fespaco 2009
