= Île Courts International Short Film Festival =

Mauritius international short film festival

Île Courts - Festival International du Court Métrage de Maurice
- Location: Mauritius
- Founded: 2007
- Founded by: David Constantin and others, Association Porteurs d'Images
- Most recent: 2018
- Festival date: 10–15 October 2017, 9–13 October 2018 (latest edition)
- Language: French
- Website: https://www.porteursdimages.org/ilecourts/en/

Île Courts International Short Film Festival (Île Courts, French: Festival international du court métrage de Maurice Île courts) was an annual autumn festival of world cinema on the island of Mauritius, with a focus on short films from the Indian Ocean area. It was organised from 2007 up to 2018 by the local non-profit Association Porteurs d'Images with David Constantin and others, featuring screenings at various locations on Mauritius, including villages and beaches. Film entries should run no longer than 30 minutes, be spoken or subtitled in French or creole, and fall in one of the genres fiction, documentary, animation, or experimental film.

== Funding ==
The festival was supported by the Institut français de Maurice (French Institute of Mauritius) and the Festival international du film d'Afrique et des îles de La Réunion. From 2014 to 2016, Porteurs d'Images was funded by the ACPCultures+ programme of the European Union led by the ACP (African, Caribbean and Pacific) Group of States, in the project "The Archipelago of Cinemas - Île Courts-International Short Film Festival of Mauritius".

== Invited leading film director ==
Since 2012, each festival invited a special established film director to serve as the event's godfather or godmother: Moussa Touré (Senegal, 2012), Anurag Kashyap (India, 2013), Newton I. Aduaka (Nigeria, 2014), Ruchika Oberoi (India, 2015), Licinio Azevedo (Mozambique, 2017), and Chantal Richard (France, 2018).

== Contents ==
Each edition of the festival featured various training workshops for filmmakers and script writers, debates, roundtables and professional meetings, such as Forum Film Bazar where film professionals of the Indian Ocean met. The programme Film Fabrik helped young Mauritian filmmakers from scriptwriting to film production and distribution. From 2009 up to 2018, 30 short movies (fiction, animation and documentaries), published in 6 collections, were produced through this programme. In "Fim Zekler" contests short films of no more than ten seconds competed.

Festival year	Film	Filmmaker	Year	Genre	Duration (min)
2009	Waramutseho! (Bonjour!)	Bernard Auguste Kouemo Yanghu (Cameroon)	2008	Drama	21 m
	Guyane	Imanou Petit (French Guiana)	2009	Fiction	13 m
2010	Madagascar, carnet de voyage	Bastien Dubois (France)	2009	Short animation	12 m
	Dounouia, la vie	Anthony Quéré, Olivier Broudeur (France)	2009	Comedy short	12 m
	Atlantiques	Mati Diop (Senegal)	2009	Drama	16 m
	Drogba est mort	Eric Rivot, Moussa W. Diarra (Mali)	2009	Drama	9 m
	Temps mort	Mohammed Bourouissa (France)	2009	Experimental	18 m
2017	Pran nesans (prendre naissance)	Daniella Bastien (Mauritius)	2014	Documentary	14 m
	Lot kote lagar (De l'autre côté de la gare)	O'Bryan Vinglassalon (Mauritius)	2017	Fiction	15 m
	Oeil des marins (L')	Leslie Wallace Athanas (Mauritius)	2017	Documentary	14 m
2018	Entrée du personnel	Manuela Frésil	2013	Documentary	59 m
	La sociologue et l’ourson	Étienne Chaillou / Mathias Théry	2016	Documentary	78 m
	Chronique d’un été (Paris 1960) (Retrospective)	Jean Rouch / Edgar Morin	1960	Documentary	85 m
	Pour la suite du monde (Retrospective)	Pierre Perrault / Michel Brault	1962	Documentary	105 m
