= Made in Mauritius =

Made In Mauritius
- Directed by: David Constantin
- Screenplay by: David Constantin
- Produced by: Caméléon Production
- Starring: Raj Bumma Put Liang Xi Gui
- Cinematography: Stephan Bellerose
- Edited by: David Constantin
- Music by: Lata Manghesgar Wada Karo
- Release date: 2009
- Running time: 7 minutes
- Country: Mauritius
- Language: Mauritian Creole

Made In Mauritius is a 2009 short comedy drama film directed by Mauritian director David Constantin. In 2011 it was the first ever Mauritian film to be selected as part of Official Selection at the Clermont-Ferrand International Short Film Festival. It also screened at the 2011 Festival Cineafricano (Milan, Italy) where it was awarded the Prix Fondation Pellegrini and at the Rencontres d’Hergla (Tunisia) in 2012.

== Synopsis ==
Bissoon, a retired peasant in a village on the Island of Mauritius, has a problem. For the first time in twenty years, the fuse to his old radio has blown. In seeking to buy a new fuse in the village shop, its owner, Ah-Yan explains that these fuses no longer exist and tries to convince Bissoon to buy a radio “made in China”. When the elderly man resists, Ah-Yan explains the benefits of globalization.
