= Against All Odds (2011 film) =

- Film poster
- German: Mit dem Bauch durch die Wand
- Directed by: Anka Schmid
- Written by: Anka Schmid
- Produced by: Franziska Reck, Reck Filmproduktion
- Cinematography: Patrick Lindenmaier, Anka Schmid
- Edited by: Marina Wernli, Matthias Bürcher
- Release date: 23 January 2011 (Solothurn)
- Running time: 93 minutes
- Country: Switzerland
- Language: Swiss German

Against All Odds (German: Mit dem Bauch durch die Wand, lit. 'With the belly through the wall') is a 2011 Swiss documentary film directed by Anka Schmid. The long term documentary accompanies three teenage mothers, their kids and the fathers during the course of four years. One can follow how the girls grow up to be young women. The documentary had its international premiere at the Berlin International Film Festival 2011 in the section Generations. The world premiere was in January 2011 at the Solothurn Film Festival.

== Summary ==
The long term documentary stretching over four years puts three Swiss teenage mothers, their characters and their ups and downs into the spotlight and lets them voice their emotions, wishes and dreams.

Sandra is able to successfully finish her apprenticeship thanks to the help of her in-laws. After the birth of her first child she moves in with her beloved boyfriend and father of the child - they become a family. Jasmine's situation on the other hand forces her to give up her child to the children's home during the week in order to be able to complete her education. Her friends help her out as best they can and she goes to court in her fight for alimony for her little boy. Jennifer and her friend Mwathi used to be the perfect couple but as soon as their daughter is born their love falls apart and there is no relying on the young father. But Jennifer gets help from her mother and manages to find a balance between motherhood and education. Later on would-be rapper Mwathi processes his behavior as an absent father in his lyrics and tries to rekindle contact with his little daughter.

== Reception ==
In 2011 the documentary won the so-called Zürcher Filmpreis, a prize awarded by the canton of Zürich. The jury particularly liked the closeness and intimacy with the protagonists, this was mainly achieved due to the fact that Schmid shot most of the film herself. The immediacy is further enhanced by the formal humbleness, relying fully on the characters.

The documentary was widely discussed in public and Swiss media. The journalist Bettina Spoerri from the Neue Zürcher Zeitung for example said that the protagonists were "tough but also very vulnerable young people who are looking for their path." She proceeded to point out that the "chances that are being given or refused to them" were "an unerring mirror of our society." Irene Genhart from the Zürcher Landzeitung wrote that the "loose juxtaposition" of the three stories was the strength of the film because it enables the viewer "to prescind and to draw parallels." According to her the film is "a heart warming, silently mischievous and thought provoking study of adolescence with a child in Switzerland."

== Festivals ==
- Solothurn Film Festival, January 2011, World Premiere in Switzerland
- Berlin International Film Festival, Section Generations, February 2011
- Showroom Workstation in Sheffield Great Britain, May 2011
- Zlín Film Festival in Czech Republic, May/June 2011
- Kaunas International Film Festival in Lithuania, September/October 2011
- Frauenwelten Tübingen in Germany, November 2011
