= Rwanda pour mémoire =

- Directed by: Samba Félix N'Diaye
- Screenplay by: Samba Félix N’Diaye
- Produced by: Les fabriques de la Vanne, CVA Dakar, Arts et Médias d’Afrique, avec le soutien de l’Agence Intergouvernementale de la Francophonie
- Cinematography: Raphaël Mulard
- Edited by: France Langlois
- Music by: Nina Simone, musiques du Rwanda
- Release date: 2003
- Running time: 68 minutes
- Countries: France; Senegal

Rwanda pour mémoire is a 2003 documentary film about the Rwandan genocide.

== Synopsis ==
In 1994, between April and July, the massacre of Tutsis and moderate Hutus left one million dead. Instigated by Fest’Africa, a dozen African authors met four years after the events as writers in residence at Kigali, to try to break the silence of African intellectuals on this genocide.

In May 2000, on the occasion of the publication of series of works based on this experience, writers and artists from Africa and elsewhere gathered in Rwanda. Facing up to the scars left by the genocide, Samba Felix N’Diaye manages to find just the right sense of distance to film the inexpressible while nevertheless communicating a message of hope.

Writers in the film include Boubacar Boris Diop, Véronique Tadjo, Benjamin Sehene, Nocky Djedanoum, Koulsy Lamko and Yves Simon, who all participated in a writer in residence program organized in Rwanda in May 2000 by the Fest'Africa literature festival based in Lille, France.
