= Happy Hour (2015 Japanese film) =

- Poster
- Directed by: Ryūsuke Hamaguchi
- Written by: Ryūsuke Hamaguchi; Tadashi Nohara; Tomoyuki Takahashi
- Produced by: Tadashi Nohara; Hideyuki Okamoto; Satoshi Takada
- Starring: Sachie Tanaka; Hazuki Kikuchi; Maiko Mihara; Rira Kawamura
- Cinematography: Yoshio Kitagawa
- Music by: Umitarō Abe
- Release dates: 14 August 2015 (Locarno); 12 December 2015 (Japan)
- Running time: 317 minutes
- Country: Japan
- Language: Japanese
- Box office: $337,256

Happy Hour (ハッピーアワー, Happī Awā) is a 2015 Japanese drama film directed by Ryūsuke Hamaguchi.

== Plot ==
The film follows the lives and loves of four middle-class, thirty-seven-year-old women who are friends and who live in Kobe: unemployed Jun, housewife Sakurako, divorced nurse Akari, and married arts administrator Fumi. After attending a seminar led by a New Age communications guru, Ukai, Jun casually reveals that she has been having an affair with a younger man and plans to divorce her husband. The other are shocked, some more hurt than others, by her secrecy. Over time, especially during a trip Jun organizes, they rekindle and re-contextualize their friendship. The three friends attend Jun's court hearing to support her; the experience reshapes their perceptions of their own lives and relationship in a set of intertwining stories.

Free-spirited and independent Jun is married to a biologist, Kohei, who strongly opposes the divorce and calmly believes that he can convince her to give up. In court, Jun admits that Kohei did not physically abuse her, but that their marriage was rife with emotional and psychological abuse. She maintains that she tried hard to be a good wife, but Kohei emotionally rejected her, and his lack of interest in sex prevented her from achieving her dream of having a baby. However, her court case goes poorly when her infidelities are admitted on tape, and she does not come across as sympathetic, or having tried to fix her marriage. Though she tries to incite Kohei to violence in private, he ignores the attempts and continues to try to get her to stop the divorce proceedings. Kohei later reveals to the rest of the friends that she is pregnant with his child. Frustrated by the lack of progress in the divorce proceedings, she flees on a ferry to an unknown destination, knowing that being separated from him long enough will automatically grant a divorce. Jun disappears for the rest of the movie, and Kohei mentions that she is in a shelter specializing in women trying to divorce their husbands.

The tough, no-nonsense Akari chafes at work with a younger and inexperienced colleague, Yuzuki, who she is training. Akari is the least forgiving of the friends and holds the longest grudges when there is a fight, but her lack of a serious romantic relationship leads her to invest time and energy into her friends. Though she is looking for a partner, she finds it difficult to connect with other men and struggles with whether or not she desires intimacy. A doctor at the hospital attempts to start a relationship with her, but she rebuffs him. Later, she reprimands Yuzuki harshly for making what could have been a serious mistake, and afterward, she accidentally falls down the stairs and breaks her leg. As she recovers, she attends an art event that Fumi is hosting, and though Ukai is slated to interview the star of the show, Kozue, he spontaneously walks out. Akari, who is attracted to him, follows him and joins him at a club. At the same club is Hinako, who was at the same event, and Akari learns that she is Ukai's sister. After they share a heart-to-heart, Hinako spontaneously kisses her, and in turn Akari kisses Ukai when he interrupts them. Eventually, Akari returns to work, where Yuzuki apologizes for not being a good enough worker. Akari, no longer as cold to Yuzuki as before, hugs her.

Sakurako, the more emotional of the friends, is married to overworked salaryman Yoshihiko, and they have a teenage son, Daiki. They also live with Yoshihiko's mother, Mitsu, who Sakurako does not feel comfortable around. Mitsu warns the couple of Daiki's relationship with a girl, but they brush off her complaints until Daiki reveals that he needs money for his girlfriend's abortion. Yoshihiko orders Sakurako to bring the money to the girl's family and apologize, much to Sakurako's distress, and when she pleads to him for help and solidarity, he retorts that he is too busy with work, and she is responsible for domestic matters. Sakurako finds the experience humiliating, but Mitsu attends the meeting with her and takes the lead, which causes them to finally bond. After Sakurako reveals to Daiki that Jun was responsible for her and Yoshihiko becoming lovers, Daiki ends up at the ferry to run away with his girlfriend, only to find that she has stood him up. Instead, he sees Jun off, and thanks her for being responsible for his birth.

Meanwhile, Sakurako, disappointed and disillusioned with Yoshihiko, embarks on her own affair. Upon returning home the following morning, she tells him that she slept with another man, and that she will not apologize or ask for his forgiveness. Yoshihiko seems unmoved and leaves for work; when he slips down the stairs, Sakurako hurries to help him and see him off, then continues on with her household chores as if nothing happened. As Yoshihiko walks to work, he eventually breaks down in tears.

Fumi is married to Takuya, who is an editor to a prized young writer, Kozue. Fumi grows increasingly insecure over their relationship, fearing that their marriage is flawed and only to keep up appearances. This is exacerbated when the rest of the friends spot Takuya and Kozue walking together, and comment on how attractive Kozue is. Takuya organizes a reading of one of Kozue's short stories. Ukai is slated to interview her when it is over, but when he spontaneously walks out, Kohei is brought on to replace him. Surprisingly, Kohei is a sensitive and engaged interviewer, and the session goes well, which alters the friends' opinions of him even as they disapprove of his dogged refusal to let Jun have her divorce. During the dinner with Kohei and Kozue, Kozue bluntly states that she believes that the other friends are projecting their feelings onto Kohei, and that even they don't understand Jun's feelings. This causes tension in the group, exacerbated when the others begin to notice Takuya's affection for Kozue. Fumi loses her nerve and storms out of the dinner, but Takuya does not follow her, and instead stays with Kozue to drive her home. On the drive, Kozue confesses she has feelings for Takuya. Takuya stays with her that night instead of returning home. The next morning, Fumi confronts Takuya and breaks up with him. Takuya apologizes for hurting her and leaves; Fumi watches him go and then collapses on the floor, while Takuya is involved in a serious car accident and is brought to Akari's hospital, where he falls into a coma.

Fumi and Akari have a moment on the hospital roof, and Fumi admits that she blames herself, as she had handed him the car keys after he had forgotten them. Akari, who had fought with Sakurako at the dinner with Kohei, promises to make up with her. Fumi leaves to be by Takuya's side when he wakes up, but not before agreeing with Akari to plan another trip with Sakurako and Jun.

== Cast ==
- Sachie Tanaka as Akari
- Hazuki Kikuchi as Sakurako
- Maiko Mihara as Fumi
- Rira Kawamura as Jun
- Kilala Inori as Yuki Misawa

== Production ==
The film was first developed while Hamaguchi was an artist in residence at KIITO Design and Creative Center Kobe in 2013. It came out of an improvisational acting workshop he held for non-professionals, with many of the film's performers having participated in the workshop.

At 317 minutes (5 hours, 17 minutes), it is one of the longest films in Japanese cinema.

== Release ==
The film had its world premiere at the 68th Locarno Film Festival on 14 August 2015. It was released in Japan on 12 December 2015.

== Reception ==
On review aggregator website Rotten Tomatoes, the film holds an approval rating of 100% based on 14 reviews, with a weighted average of 8.5/10. On Metacritic, the film has a weighted average score of 87 out of 100, based on 4 critics, indicating "universal acclaim".

The four lead actresses shared the best actress award and the film earned a special mention for its script at the 2015 Locarno Film Festival. The film was voted the third best Japanese film of 2015 in the Kinema Junpo poll of critics. Upon its release in the United States, Richard Brody of The New Yorker wrote that "Hamaguchi is a genius of scene construction, turning the fierce poetry of painfully revealing and pugnaciously wounding dialogue into powerful drama that’s sustained by a seemingly spontaneous yet analytically precise visual architecture". He selected the film as one of the 10 best of 2016, and later as the best Japanese film of the 21st century. Vadim Rizov also held the latter opinion, saying, "The logline is that it’s a drama about five [sic] Japanese women charting their friendship, using duration to build character depth, and that’s absolutely true, but there’s so much more". Dan Sullivan in Film Comment stated, "Buoyed by four captivating performances from its unheralded actresses, Happy Hour is a fascinating, towering confection of contradictions". Ben Konigsberg in The New York Times wrote that "If 'Happy Hour' doesn't quite deliver all it promises, that may only be because it promises quite a lot".

The film was placed at number 85 on The A.V. Club's "100 Best Movies of the 2010s" list, number 27 on Slant Magazine's "100 Best Films of the 2010s" list, and number 94 on IndieWire's "100 Best Movies of the Decade" list.

== See also ==
- List of longest films
