= Behind Locked Doors (1991 film) =

1991 film

- German: Hinter verschlossenen Türen
- Directed by: Anka Schmid
- Written by: Anka Schmid
- Produced by: Martin Schmassmann
- Starring: Hans Madin; Walter Pfeil; Maria Fitzi; Susanne Fitzner; Jockel Tschiersch; Aline Krayewski; Alfred Hartung; Sonja Deutsch; Volkart Buff
- Cinematography: Ciro Cappellari
- Edited by: Inge Schneider; Anka Schmid
- Music by: Klaus Wagner; Stefan Schiske
- Production companies: Mano Film; DFFB
- Release dates: 23 January 1991 (Switzerland); 10 October 1991 (Germany)
- Running time: 80min
- Countries: Switzerland; Germany
- Language: Swiss German

Behind Locked Doors (German: Hinter verschlossenen Türen) is a feature film by Swiss/German director Anka Schmid from 1991. The ensemble-film shows the everyday life of 17 inhabitants of an apartment building in Berlin Kreuzberg.

== Plot ==
At first glance the seventeen inhabitants of the old apartment building in Berlin Kreuzberg do not seem to have much in common other than their address. But nonetheless, when the old photographer Mr. Kempinski invites his neighbors to his 80th birthday party, they are all strangely familiar. There is 60-year-old Hannelore who dreams about distant countries and who currently shares her apartment with her lovesick niece; there is student Bona from the Ivory Coast who teaches French in the kitchen while his gay roommate enjoys life and love; the two adolescent sisters with their mother, who has fallen in love recently; the middle-aged married janitors; and then there is the young couple whose daughter prefers sitting in the stairwell to going to school.

== Festivals and awards ==
Behind Locked Doors won Anka Schmid the Swiss Nachwuchspreis for up and coming film makers. The movie also won the Film Award of Zürich as well as the 2nd award of the Film Festival Schwerin.

=== Further festivals ===
- Chicago International Film Festival, Film Festival Saarbrücken/Max-Ophüls Award, Strasbourg European Fantastic Film Festival, Bergamo Film Meeting, Warsaw International Film Festival, Créteil International Women's Film Festival
