= Le Rêve de Rico =

2001 film

- Directed by: Selven Naïdu
- Screenplay by: Olivier Lorelle; Selven Naïdu
- Based on: a novel by Jean-Claude Larrieu
- Produced by: La Huit Production
- Starring: Aljojah Izoo; Sharon Pillay Valoo; Marie-Thérèse Irana; Annie Izoo; Jacelyn Irana; Berty Maclou
- Cinematography: Pierre-Olivier Larrieu
- Edited by: Selven Naïdu, Michel Vuillermet
- Music by: Selven Naïdu
- Release date: 2001
- Running time: 22 minutes
- Countries: France; Mauritius
- Language: Mauritian Creole

Le Rêve de Rico (transl. Rico's dream) is a 2001 short film. The film was awarded at the Directors' Fortnight of the Cannes Film Festival.

The film was screened at The African and Réunion Islands International Festival.

== Synopsis ==
Rico, 11, wakes up early to study for an exam. Today he has to pass the CPE, the exam that, in Mauritius, will get him into high school. He gets on the bus, but unfortunately, it breaks down. So he grabs a ride on a truck, but a fire brings traffic to a standstill. A neighbor offers to take him in his car. He's on his way, but fate has other plans.

== Production ==
The short film was reportedly the first film to be made in Mauritius by a Mauritian director since the 1960s. The film began production in 1996, and it was still under production as of 1997 and 2000.
