= Honayn's Shoe =

- Directed by: Mohamed Ghazala
- Screenplay by: Mohamed Ghazala
- Produced by: Cinema Palace – Ministerio de la Cultura
- Cinematography: Mohamed Ghazala
- Edited by: Mohamed Ghazala
- Music by: Nik Philips
- Release date: 2009
- Country: Egypt

Honayn's Shoe is a 2009 film.

== Synopsis ==
Honayn’s Shoe is an animated tale about a lost nomad’s search in the desert, with his camel, for his lost shoe.

== Awards ==
- African Movie Academy Awards 2010
