= The Last Shore =

2025 Belgian documentary film

- Directed by: Jean-François Ravagnan
- Written by: Jean-François Ravagnan
- Produced by: Julie Frères
- Cinematography: Thomas Schira
- Edited by: Marc Recchia
- Music by: Jean Kapsa
- Production companies: Dérives; Michigan Films; Wallonie Image Production
- Release date: April 10, 2025 (Visions du Réel)
- Running time: 71 minutes
- Countries: Belgium; France; Qatar
- Language: Fula

The Last Shore (French: La Dernière Rive) is a 2025 documentary film directed by Jean-François Ravagnan. The film delves into the tragic story of Pateh Sabally, a young Gambian man who drowned in Venice's Grand Canal in 2017, and the aftermath experienced by his family.

== Premise ==
In January 2017, a video of a young Gambian drowning in the waters of Venice’s Grand Canal went viral on social networks. From the shore, passers-by insulted him without helping him. Filmed with a mobile phone, the body, petrified by the cold, appears to be sinking despite the lifebuoys thrown in its direction. He was 22 and his name was Pateh Sabally. 2500 miles away, the voices and faces of his family tell the story that preceded this tragedy, the story behind the image...

== Production ==
The Last Shore is a co-production between Belgium, France, and Qatar. The film was produced by Dérives, with co-production support from Michigan Films, Wallonie Image Production, Les Films d'Ici, and Sténopé. Julie Frères served as the producer.

== Release ==
The film had its world premiere at the 2025 Visions du Réel film festival in Nyon, Switzerland, where it was featured in the Highlights section. It also screened at DOK.fest München in May 2025.
