= Thato Lingwati =

South African soccer player

Personal information
- Full name: Cyril Thato Lingwati
- Date of birth: 11 June 1992 (age 34)
- Place of birth: Burgersfort, Limpopo, South Africa
- Height: 1.84 m (6 ft 0 in)
- Position: Centre-back

Senior career*
| Years | Team | Apps | (Gls) |
| 2013–2018 | Jomo Cosmos | 114 | (5) |
| 2018–2021 | Bloemfontein Celtic | 30 | (1) |
| 2021–2024 | Royal AM | 36 | (0) |

International career^{‡}
| 2017 | South Africa | 1 | (0) |
- * Club domestic league appearances and goals as of 15 September 2024 ‡ National team caps and goals as of 15 September 2024

Cyril Thato Lingwati (born 11 June 1992) is a South African soccer player who last played as a centre-back for South African Premier Division side Royal AM.

While at Bloemfontein Celtic, he would form a duo in central defense with Alfred Ndengane, but Ndengane soon left the club.

In 2024 Lingwati left Royal AM following a wage dispute, alongside Ruzaigh Gamildien and Menzi Masuku.

== Personal life ==
In 2018, he lost a child.
