= On the Edge (2011 film) =

- Film poster
- French: Sur la planche
- Directed by: Leïla Kilani
- Starring: Soufia Issami; Mouna Bahmad
- Release date: 19 May 2011 (CFF)
- Running time: 110 minutes
- Countries: Germany; Morocco; France
- Languages: Arabic, French

On the Edge (French: Sur la planche) is a 2011 German-Moroccan-French drama film directed by Leïla Kilani.

The film was awarded an Honorable Mention by the SIGNIS Award during the Cordoba African Film Festival 2012.
