= Tikkun (film) =

2015 film by Avishai Sivan

Tikkun is a 2015 Israeli film directed by Avishai Sivan. The film explores the struggles of a young Hasidic man who questions his faith.

== Plot ==
Haim-Aron, a young Hasidic student, feels detached from his religious way of life. Following a near death experience, the young man faces an intense spiritual crisis and finds himself at odds with the Hasidic religious faith.

== Awards ==
- Best Feature Film, Best Cinematography, Best Script and Best Actor awards at the Jerusalem Film Festival
- Silver Leopard Prize at the 2015 Locarno Film Festival

== See also ==
- Tikkun olam, a concept in Judaism
