= Magic Matterhorn =

- Directed by: Anka Schmid
- Screenplay by: Anka Schmid
- Cinematography: Ciro Cappellari
- Edited by: Inge Schneider
- Music by: Ben Jeger
- Release date: 1995
- Running time: 87min
- Country: Switzerland
- Languages: Swiss German, German, English

Magic Matterhorn (1995) is an essayistic documentary by Swiss director Anka Schmid about the meaning of one's homeland, its clichés and reality. The Matterhorn mountain is the starting point for the portrayal of a part-time farmer from the Swiss mountain village Zermatt, a professional Swiss yodeler in Disneyland, California and the cabaret group called Geschwister Pfister.

== Storyline ==
In a playful manner the film embarks on the search for contemporary notions of homeland and shows real and surreal worlds. The film was shot in the Swiss tourist village Zermatt at the foot of the iconic Matterhorn mountain as well as in Disneyland in California where there is a copy of the Matterhorn. Anka Schmid confronts concrete living conditions with clichés and is not afraid of the balancing act between philosophical thoughts and kitsch-souvenirs. The Matterhorn serves as a leitmotif. People from Zermatt, tourists from all over the world and a Swiss-American explain their understanding of homeland and their relationship with the mystically superelevated Matterhorn mountain. The interviews are accompanied by pictures of the mountain and performances by the cabaret group.

== Festivals ==
- September 1995: Nyon, 26th Festival International du Cinéma Documentaire
- January 1996: Solothurn, 31st Solothurn Film Festival
- March 1996: Créteil 18, Festival International du Film de Femmes
- April/May 1996: Trento, 44th Filmfestival International Montagna Esplorazione
- April/May 1996: Minneapolis/St. Paul, 14th Rivertown International Film Festival
- September 1996: Les Diablerets, 27th Festival International du Film Alpin, receiving a special award by the jury
- September 1996: Figueira da Foz, 25th Festival international de cinéma

== Reviews ==
The International Film Encyclopedia describes Magic Matterhorn as an "amusing documentary, which thanks to the juxtaposition of highly diverse viewpoints ended up being very multifaceted but over time is lacking in intensity."
