= Jakob Brossmann =

Austrian film producer

- Born: 1986 (age 39–40); Vienna, Austria
- Occupations: Stage designer, producer, director
- Writing career
- Notable work: Lampedusa im Winter

Jakob Brossmann (born 1986) is a stage designer and documentary filmmaker. Brossmann is best known as producer and director of the documentary film Lampedusa in Winter, released in 2015, and currently lives in Vienna, Austria.

== Early life and education ==
Jakob Brossmann was born in Vienna and studied scenography at the Universität für Angewandte Kunst in Vienna, Austria. During this time, he worked as a stage design assistant for Prof. Bernhard Kleber. He was awarded the Förderpreis des Landes Niederösterreich und der Universität für Angewandte Kunst for his diploma thesis SCHWANZERTRAKT...

Brossmann has given presentations at international institutions and events, including Docudays Kiev, Belgrade Magnificent 7 Filmfestival, Ethnocineca Filmfestival Wien, Medienzentrum WienXtra. He has also held lecturing positions at the Universität für Angewandte Kunst and Cornell University.

== Career ==
=== Theater production ===
Much of Jakob Brossmann's work in theater has been with puppet theater, which he was exposed to from a young age. He has collaborated on several such plays with director Nikolaus Habjan, including versions of Goethe's Faust Part One and Albert Camus' The Misunderstanding.

In 2007 Brossmann developed the new interior design for Künstlerhaus brut Wien (formerly dieTheater), in collaboration with the collective konstantin gabel. He has since designed stages for a number of plays at theaters in Austria, (Germany), and Switzerland. These locales include: Schauspielhaus Graz, Next Liberty Graz, Bavarian State Opera, Residenz Theater Munich, Volkstheater Vienna, Max Reinhardt Seminar Vienna, Djungel Vienna, Akademietheater Vienna, WUK Vienna, and Schauspielhaus Zürich

=== Documentary production ===
Brossmann has worked in a variety of positions in documentary production, from camera operator in his early years to producer and director more recently. His projects can be generally categorized as observational documentaries. He has stated that one of the benefits of this style is its ability to promote reflection on ourselves and the world, which can then be shared with others through the documentaries. When speaking in an interview about Lampedusa im Winter, Brossman discussed his motivations for focusing on refugees and migration.

In recent years, Jakob Brossman has worked with the production company Finali Film & Wortschatz Produktion, with whom he produced the documentary film Lampedusa im Winter.

During a December 2017 interview with Austrian channel Okto, Brossman briefly discussed his current project with colleague David Paede. This new documentary project will focus on the art of radio production and Austrian radio broadcaster Österreich 1

== Works ==
=== Plays ===
- 2015 Das Missverständnis
- 2016 Faust: Der Tragödie Erster Teil
- 2017 Oberon
- 2018 Der Streit

=== Filmography ===
- 2010 #unibrennt – Bildungsprotest 2.0
- 2010 Rückruf
- 2011 Tagwerk
- 2015 Lampedusa im Winter
- 2017 Dokumente, die die Welt bewegen (3 episodes)
- 2019 "Gehört, Gesehen - Ein Radiofilm" (international title "Listen to the Radio") co-directed with David Paede
- 2021 "Die Kunst der Folgenlosigkeit" (international title "The Art of Inconsequentiality") co-directed with Friedrich von Borries

== Awards ==
- 2015 Best Documentary – Vienna Movie Award
- 2015 Best Documentary – Austrian Academy Award
- 2015 Best Film of all Applicants – Boccalino d'Oro
- 2015 Best Director – Jean Vigo Prize
- 2019 Audience Award Diagonale
