= Wild Women: Gentle Beasts =

- Directed by: Anka Schmid
- Written by: Anka Schmid
- Produced by: Franziska Reck, Reck Filmproduktion
- Starring: Namayca Bauer (France); Carmen Zander (Germany); Nadezhda and Aliya Takshantova (Russia); Anosa Kouta (Egypt and Qatar)
- Cinematography: Peter Indergand, Anka Schmid (additional)
- Edited by: Loredana Cristelli
- Music by: Roman Lerch
- Production companies: Reck Filmproduktion (Zurich, Switzerland)
- Release date: August 10, 2015 (Locarno Film Festival)
- Running time: 96 minutes
- Country: Switzerland
- Languages: Arabic, French, German, Russian

Wild Women: Gentle Beasts is a feature documentary by Swiss director Anka Schmid, released in 2015. Schmid documents the life and work of female animal tamers from four nations: Egypt, France, Germany and Russia. The world premiere was at the film festival Visions du Réel in Nyon in April 2015. The international premiere was at the Hof International Film Festival in October 2015.

== Summary ==
Wild Women - Gentle Beasts documents the life and work of five animal tamers, Namayca Bauer from France, Carmen Zander from Germany, Nadezhda and Aliya Takshantova from Russia as well as Anosa Kouta from Egypt, who, due to the political circumstances at the time of shooting was touring in Qatar. The film shows not only the women on stage performing their breath taking acts but also their life off stage where they fight for their existence in a profession that might soon be banned. All of them work in a circus and tame tigers (Zander), lions (Bauer and Kouta) and bears (Takshantova). Schmid shows the life beyond the flashy stage shows and mainly takes a close look at the harsh reality of everyday life in a circus. The camera follows them around and in a respectful manner gets very close to the animal tamers. They reveal their deep passion and love for their wild animals and their extraordinary job, as well as their desires, aspirations and fears. It shows how the women have to cross their own physical and mental limits on a daily basis and that mortal danger is an integral part of their vocation. In contrasting images of domina vs. lap cat and beauty vs. the beast the film shows how affectionate yet extremely exhausting the relationship between animals and tamers is.

== Festivals and screenings ==
- March 2016: Thessaloniki Documentary Festival
- February 2016: Cairo International Women's Film Festival
- January 2016: Solothurn Film Festival
- December 2015: Artdocfest Moscow
- November 2015: Dharamshala International Film Festival
- November 2015: Biberacher Filmfestspiele
- October 2015: Hof International Film Festival
- August 2015: Festival del Film Locarno
- April 2015: Visions du Réel, Nyon
