= Malek Bensmaïl =

Algerian film director, screenwriter and film producer

- Born: 1966 (age 59–60); Constantine, Algeria
- Occupations: Film director, screenwriter, cinematographer and film producer
- Writing career
- Language: French, Arabic
- Notable works: movies Des vacances, malgré tout / Despite all holidays (2001), Aliénations (2004), and La Chine est encore loin / China Is Still Far Away (2008).

Malek Bensmaïl is an Algerian film director, screenwriter, cinematographer and film producer.

== Biography ==
Born in 1966 in Constantine, Algeria, Bensmaïl graduated in cinematography from the École supérieure d'études cinématographiques (ESEC Film School), Paris, in 1990, and did an internship with Lenfilm production company in Saint Petersburg.

== Filmography ==
Bensmaïl's films include:

Year	Film	Genre	Role	Duration (min)
1990	Roumanie, l'après Ceaucescu	Sociopolitical documentary on Romania after the fall of Ceaușescu in 1989	Director	
1999	Boudiaf, un espoir assassiné	Political documentary portrait of the assassinated Algerian politician Mohamed Boudiaf	Co-director with Noël Zurich	58 m
1999	Territoire(s)	Political documentary short on the violence in the history of Algeria, inspired by Jacques Berque	Director, screenwriter, and producer	28 m
2001	Des vacances, malgré tout / Despite all holidays	Documentary	Director and screenwriter	70 m
2001	Démokratia	Political fiction short	Director and screenwriter	17 m
2004	Aliénations	Documentary on everyday life in a psychiatric hospital	Director, screenwriter and cinematographer	105 m
2008	La Chine est encore loin / China Is Still Far Away	Historical documentary on an Algerian village 54 years after the War of Independence	Director and screenwriter	120 m
2013	Odysseys	Fiction comedy	Director, screenwriter and producer	110 m
2015	Contre-Pouvoirs / Checks and Balances	Political documentary on the Algerian daily El Watan	Director, screenwriter, producer, and cinematographer	97 m
2017	La Bataille d'Alger, un film dans l'Histoire / The Battle of Algiers: a Film Within History	Historical documentary on the movie The Battle of Algiers (1966) by Gillo Pontecorvo	Director, screenwriter and producer	117 m
2021	Toute l'Algérie du monde	Documentary on Algeria's recent history	Director	53 m

== Awards ==
Bensmaïl's films obtained four prizes and eight nominations, including:

Film	Festival	Award
Des vacances, malgré tout / Despite all holidays (2001)	Cinéma du Réel, Paris	2001 Heritage Award
Aliénations (2004)	Cinéma du Réel, Paris	2004 Libraries Award
La Chine est encore loin / China Is Still Far Away (2008)	Three Continents Festival, Nantes	2008 Special Jury Award
La Chine est encore loin / China Is Still Far Away (2008)	Filmfest München (Munich International Film Festival)	2009 Documentary Film Award of the Bavarian Broadcasting Corporation and Telepool
