= Leïla Kilani =

- لَيْلَى كيلاني
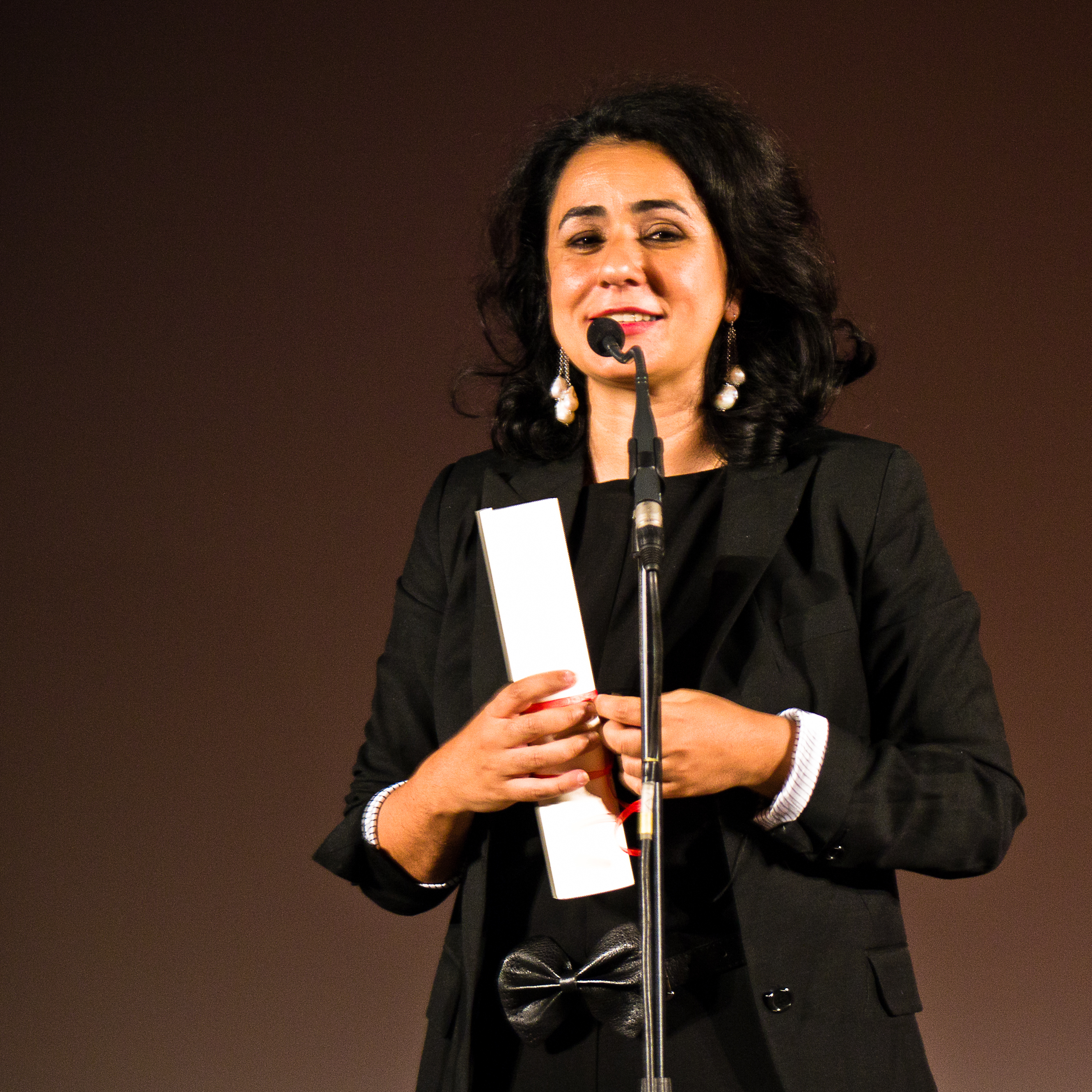
- Leïla Kilani at the Festival Paris Cinema
- Born: 1970 (age 55–56)
- Education: School for Advanced Studies in the Social Sciences, master's degree
- Occupations: Director, screenwriter, and producer
- Years active: 2000-
- Notable work: Nos Lieux Interdits; On the Edge; Sur La Planche; Birdland (Indivision)

Leïla Kilani (Arabic: لَيْلَى كيلاني; born 1970) is a Moroccan director, screenwriter, and producer. Kilani has worked on films such as Nos Lieux Interdits (2008), Zad Moultaka (2003), and directed the feature film On the Edge (2011). Kilani was born in the city of Casablanca in the northern part of Africa.

Kilani's films often deal with the political and socio-economic nature of different places, often them being set in her home country. Her documentaries have depicted many of the issues that are faced in some of the affected regions in Morocco and also deals with the difficult living conditions.

== Early life and education ==
Leïla Kilani studied Mediterranean history and civilization in Paris and obtained a master's degree at the School for Advanced Studies in the Social Sciences. During the late 1990s to the early 2000s, Kilani became a freelance journalist and had made her documentary named Tanger, La Reve De Bruleurs (2002), the story of young immigrants, adjusting to life in Tangier, Morocco. Kilani would later go on to make more documentaries before directing her first feature film in 2011.

== Career ==
Kilani had made documentaries that often depicted a part of her past life, for example in the film Tanger, La Reve de Bruleur(2002), the story "presented a personal perspective of Tangier, this physical, corporeal, sensual frontier, stirring with men and women who dream of a mythical somewhere that they cannot find on this side of the barrier.", the documentary took place in Tangier, a place where she had lived and depicted much of the political elements of young immigrants. Kilani has mentioned that inspiration for the documentary had to do with her fascination with Spain and the Spanish language. She has also mentioned in an interview with Le Monde, a French newspaper, that the term "Bruleur" was meant to signify the burning of an identity, specifically the identities of the young immigrants that are presented in the film. Kilani goes on to mention that the conditions of the country they are from are not enough to sustain their dreams therefore they must displace themselves and therefore burn their identities.

One of her most well known documentary works is the film Nos Lieux Interdits(2008). This documentary is a story taking place in the 70s with the reign of the Moroccan king, Hassan II recounting the stories of families during his reign. This film maarewnattention to Kilani d the film han a prize in documentary at the 21st Pan-African Film and TV Festival in 2009. Tese documentaries would later on lead to Kilani's first feature-length film, Sur La Planche (2011). Sur La Planche has been described as a film about "two women flirting with crime in Tangiers", takes place in Tangiers and was first screened in Cannes in May 2011.

In 2023, Kilani's film Birdland (Indivision), which she wrote and directed, came out.

== Filmography ==
Title	Year	Notes
Tanger, La Reve de Bruleur	2002	Documentary
Zad Moultaka	2003	Documentary
Our Forbidden Places	2008	Documentary
On the Edge	2011	Feature Film
Birdland (Indivision)	2023	Feature Film
