= Anka Schmid =

Swiss screenwriter

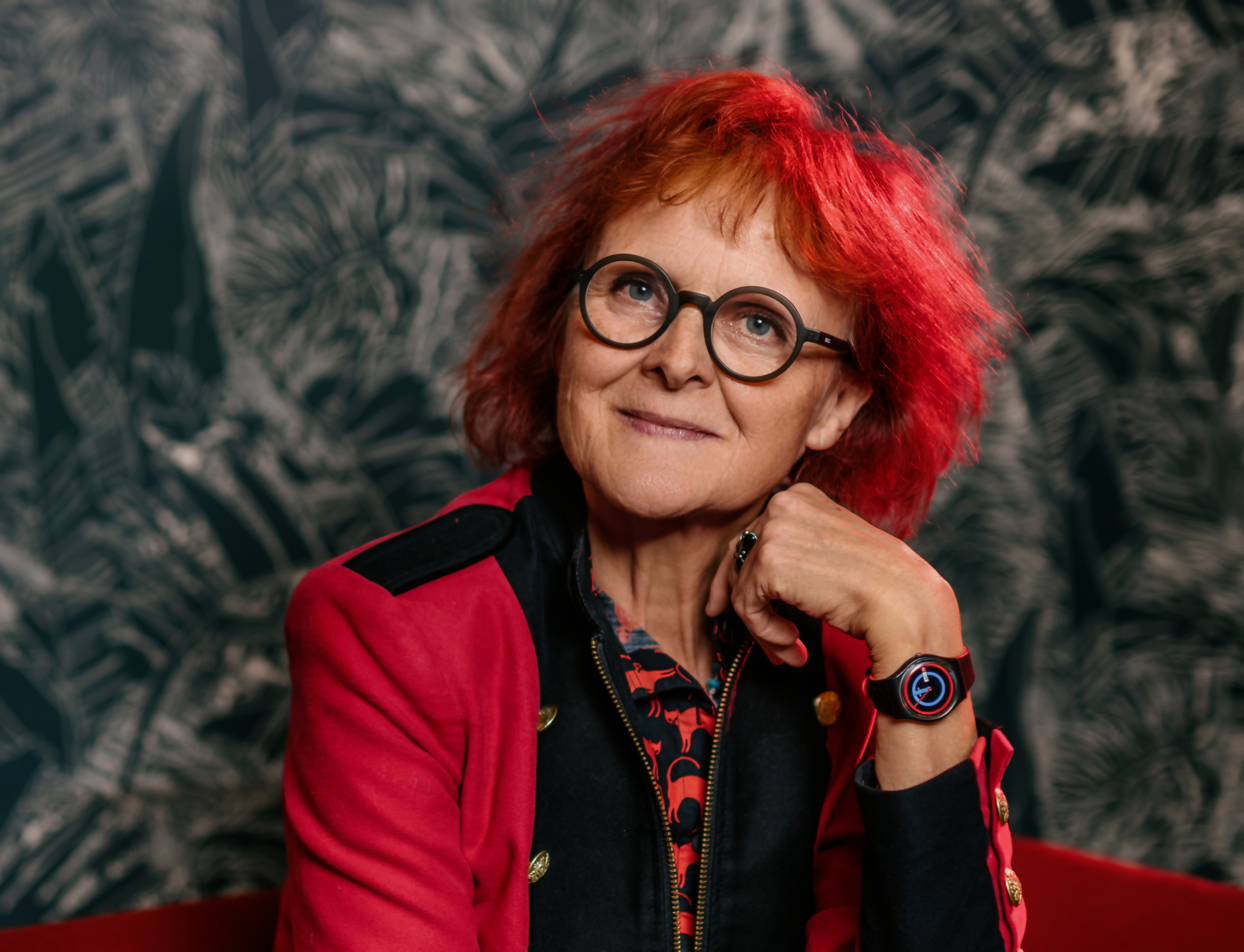
- Born: 8 March 1961 (age 64); Zurich, Switzerland
- Occupations: Film director; screenwriter; video artist

Anka Schmid (born 8 March 1961) is a film director, screenwriter and video artist. She is considered a German as well as a Swiss artist.

== Life and education ==
Anka Schmid is the eldest of three daughters of an engineer and a school teacher and grew up in Zurich, Switzerland. After finishing an all-girls high school in 1980 she began her studies in German philology. In the 1980s she was a member of a street theatre group and a music band, it was also then that she made her first experimental videos and Super 8 films. In 1984 she moved to Berlin and studied at the German Film and Television Academy DFFB (Deutsche Film- und Fernsehakademie Berlin). During her studies at the DFFB she made a number of her own videos and short films on 16mm but also worked as a camera assistant and assistant director in professional productions.

== Film projects ==
During 1989 Schmid lived in the Hopi Reservation in Arizona in the United States. Together with Swiss artist Agnes Barmettler and the Hopi Native American James Danaqymptewa she shot the feature documentary Techqua Ikachi, Land - My Life which was shown at the Sundance Film Festival in 1992. Schmid completed her studies at DFFB in 1991 with her feature film Behind Locked Doors (original title Hinter verschlossenen Türen) which won several awards. She has since been living and working as an independent film maker and assistant director in Germany, Switzerland, France, Argentina and the US.

In 1994 her son was born in Berlin. Shortly after she finished her film essay Magic Matterhorn which she shot in Zermatt, California and Berlin. Four years later, in 1998, she and her son moved from Berlin to Zurich. There, apart from working on her own film and art projects, Schmid also started working as a lecturer at universities as well as film and media schools. Additionally she has been conducting workshops for children and teenagers, showing them how to create an animated films. Her feature documentary Against All Odds (original title Mit dem Bauch durch die Wand) was awarded with the so-called Zürcher Filmpreis, the film award of the city of Zurich in 2011. Her latest feature documentary Wild Women – Gentle Beasts about female animal tamers in the circus was shot and shown in Germany, France, Russia and Switzerland. Schmid has also had numerous exhibitions and art-interventions since the late 1990s.

== Filmography (selection) ==
- 1986: Die Reise zur Südsee (script, director, drawings, edit)
- 1986: Habibi − Ein Liebesbrief (script, director, edit)
- 1986: Herzens-Freude (script, director, animation, edit)
- 1989: Techqua Ikachi, Land - My Life (script, director, cinematography)
- 1991: Behind Locked Doors (script, director)
- 1991: Praktisch und friedlich (script, director)
- 1996: Magic Matterhorn (script, director)
- 1997: Labyrinth-Projektionen (script, director, cinematography, producer)
- 1998: Little Sister (script, director)
- 2000: Das Engadiner Wunder (script, director, cinematography, producer)
- 2002: Perpetuum Mobile
- 2003: ABC Sound Alphabet (script, director)
- 2005: Yello – Electropop Made In Switzerland (script, director)
- 2007: Rondo Industrial – Found Footage II (Mechanisch & Organisch) (concept, director)
- 2007: Shake Hands – Found Footage IV (Diplomatie & Choreografie)
- 2009: Isa Hesse-Rabinovitch – Das grosse Spiel (script, director)
- 2009: Hierig-Heutig (concept, execution)
- 2011: Against All Odds (script, director, cinematography)
- 2012: Marzili Badi
- 2014: Fe-Male
- 2015: Wild Women – Gentle Beasts (script, director)
