= Festival of African Cinema =

Annual film festival

African Film Festival of Tarifa - FCAT
- Location: 2004-2011: Tarifa, Spain; 2012–2015: Córdoba, Andalusia, Spain; 2016–present: Tarifa and Tangier, Morocco
- Founded: 2004
- Language: International
- Website: fcat.es

The Festival of African Cinema (FCAT), also known as Tarifa-Tangier African Film Festival, originally African Film Showcase of Tarifa (Muestra de Cine Africano de Tarifa) (2004–2006) and formerly African Film Festival of Tarifa (Festival de Cine Africano de Tarifa) (2007–2014), the African Film Festival of Cordoba (Festival Cine Africano Cordoba) (2012–2015), is an annual festival devoted to African cinema held in the Spanish city of Tarifa and the Moroccan city of Tangier.

== History ==
The African Film Festival of Tarifa, also known by the acronym FCAT, was born in 2004 at the initiative of the NGO Al Tarab, based in Tarifa, in Cadiz province. During the first three years the event was intended as a sample of the best film production from Africa; at the 4th edition it became a competition Festival. The Festival was founded with the aim of publicising a new image of Africa to the Spanish public, away from the stereotypes provided by the mass media. Tarifa was a meeting point and a symbolic geographic space for the meeting and exchange of cultures. The 9th edition of the Festival will be held in Cordoba, its new host city, and will offer 94 screenings coming from Africa as well as from the Arab countries, as a new feature in the event's programme.

With the years, aside from cinema, the Festival has developed a wide range of associated activities such as visual art exhibitions, performances and participative workshops for children. The Festival programme also includes special screenings for the youth; this year around 6,000 children will participate. Since 2007, the Festival also features an area devoted to the film industry. It includes Africa Produce's forum for film co-production, a space intended to facilitate new agreements between audiovisual producers and professionals from the African and European continents. It also includes debates and round tables, this year especially aimed at brainstorming about new opportunities to build understanding between public bodies for film funding from both continents. Nowadays, the Festival's involvement with the African film industry has become one of the pillars of the event.

== Structure of the festival ==
The Festival is divided into a number of competitive and non-competitive sections:

Competitive sections

- The African Dream section on feature films made by African directors and / or produced by an African country in the last 2 years;
- Across the Strait section dedicated to documentaries made by African directors and / or produced by an African country in the last 2 years;
- Africa in Short section dedicated to short films by African directors and / or produced by an African country in the last 2 years.

Sections out of competition

- Open screen
- Animáfrica

Section tribute

- Monographic sections
- Retrospective sections

== Awards ==
Each year the international feature film Jury decides to grant the following awards:

- Award to the best feature film, delivered to the producer;
- Award for Best Actress;
- Award for Best Actor;
- Award of the city of Cordoba, delivered to the director;

The international documentary and short film Jury votes the following prizes:

- Griot for best documentary;
- Griot for best short film;

The festival is not merely the projection of films during its days of programming:

- Other activities: concerts, visual art exhibitions, workshops, keynote speeches
- Professional Encounters: workshops and seminars to further a constructive debate between Cultural industry professionals, from African, Arab or European countries alike
- School programming: involving youngsters by screening African films in schools of the province

== See also ==
- Cordoba African Film Festival 2012
