= Singing Away the Hunger =

1996 autobiography

Singing Away the Hunger: The Autobiography of an African Woman
- Author: Mpho 'M'atsepo Nthunya
- Subject: Culture of Lesotho, Women under apartheid, Patriarchy
- Genre: Autobiography
- Publisher: University of Natal Press (1996), Indiana University Press (1997)
- Publication date: 22 October 1997
- Pages: 174
- ISBN: 978-0-253-33352-0

Singing Away the Hunger: The Autobiography of an African Woman is a 1996 autobiography by Mosotho woman Mpho 'M'atsepo Nthunya, edited by K. Limakatso Kendall.

Nthunya, a Lesotho elder and matriarch, spent three decades as a domestic worker, supporting eleven people on her income. At the National University of Lesotho, she met and befriended Kendall, an American writer who was a Fulbright Senior Scholar. Becoming friends, the two collaborated to record Nthunya's life story.

Nthunya was born in 1930. Impoverished as a child, she often lacked clothing, shoes, and food, occasionally having to eat grass. She was able to freely attend Catholic grade school in South Africa, ultimately learning to read and speak eight languages. She modeled her life and faith on that of her Roman Catholic mother, but also maintained traditional beliefs in magic, wizards, and illness-causing spells. As an adult, Nthunya dealt with the death of her husband, and the murders of her father, brother, and children. Despite these hardships, Nthunya maintained a "love of natural beauty, as well as her sense of humor, hope, and dreams."

In loosely connected episodes, including stories passed to her from her mother, Nthunya describes the difficult life facing many Basotho women, who must deal with a choice between the dangers, hardships, and degrading working conditions of city life as an indigenous African under apartheid, and the challenges of traditional rural life. In the Basotho community, women often face child mortality, forced marriage, domestic abuse and single parenthood. Illness and starvation are constant threats, and these are compounded by what Nthunya describes as the destructive force of jealousy in impoverished communities. Despite this, Nthunya chose in 1949 to move her family away from city life under apartheid to her rural homeland, so that they could learn the traditions of their people. The cultural conflict between city and rural life, and between Western and traditional culture, are a major theme of the book.

Customs and rituals are a constant guiding force in Basotho life. The Basotho society is a patriarchal one: marriages are arranged without concern for women's preferences, and women are responsible for childcare and management of the household, but may receive little financial support. They live under the control of their husbands or male relatives, including their children. Women who are unable to bear children are stigmatized. With no power over men, women in Basotho society often oppress and victimize their sisters. However, Nthunya cherished the female friendships she had in the society.

== Reviews ==
Publishers Weekly called Nthunya's narration "eloquent", and described her writing as having a "dignified emotional distance... punctuated by her very human humor and pain." Kirkus called the book "poignant and beautifully crafted", a "commanding and important work that will captivate readers with its unique voice, narrative power, and unforgettable scenes of life in southern Africa."

In Women's Studies Quarterly, Nthunya's book was favorably compared with two novels by African writers, So Long a Letter by Mariama Bâ and Petals of Blood by Ngũgĩ wa Thiong'o, which also deal with themes of women's struggle in patriarchal societies, and that of widows in particular. The stories are said to speak "not only to the personal, not only to the Lesotho, not only to the African, but to the universal female experience."
