= Noma Award for Publishing in Africa =

Prize awarded to African writers and scholars

The Noma Award for Publishing in Africa (French:Le Prix Noma de Publication en Afrique), which ran from 1980 to 2009, was an annual $10,000 prize for outstanding African writers and scholars who published in Africa. Within four years of its establishment, the prize "had become the major book award in Africa". It was one of the series of Noma Prizes.

The prize was established in 1979 by Shoichi Noma (died 1984), president of Kodansha Ltd, the largest publishing house in Japan, to encourage the publication of works by African authors. The award was annual and given to any new book published in three categories: literature, juvenile and scholarly. The award was sponsored by Kodansha Ltd, administered by the quarterly African Book Publishing Record, and presented under the auspices of UNESCO. Books were admissible in any of the languages of Africa, whether local or European. The award was ended in 2009 after the Noma family ceased its sponsorship.

== Winners ==
- 1980: Une Si Longue Lettre by Mariama Bâ
- 1981: Health Education for the Community by Felix C. Adi
- 1982: The Brassman’s Secret by Meshack Asare
- 1983: Criminal Procedure in Ghana by Austin N.E. Amissah
- 1984: Mesandiki wa Mau Mau Ithaamirio-in [prison memoirs in Gikuyu] by Gakaara wa Wanjau, Fools and other stories by Njabulo Ndebele (Johannesburg: Ravan Press)
- 1985: La Trahison de Marianne by Bernard Nanga
- 1986: Sobreviver em Tarrafal de Santiago [poetry] by António Jacinto
- 1987: Villes de Côte d’Ivoire, 1893–1940 by Pierre Kipré
- 1988: Working Life. Factories, Townships, and Popular Culture on the Rand, 1886-1940 by Luli Callinicos
- 1989: Bones by Chenjerai Hove
- 1990: Uprooting Poverty: The South African Challenge by Francis Wilson & Mamphela Ramphele
- 1991: Waiting Laughters [poetry] by Niyi Osundare
- 1992: A comme Algériennes by Souad Khodja; One Day, Long Ago. More Stories from a Shona Childhood by Charles Mungoshi, illustrated by Luke Toronga
- 1993: Third World Express by Mongane Wally Serote
- 1994: A Modern Economic History of Africa. Volume 1: The Nineteenth Century (Dakar: CODESRIA, 1993)
- 1995: Triomf by Marlene van Niekerk
- 1996: Destins parallèles by Kitia Toure
- 1997: Mfantsipim and the Making of Ghana: A Centenary History, 1876-1976 by A. Adu Boahen
- 1998: The Politics of Liberation in South Sudan: An Insider's View by Peter Adwok Nyaba
- 1999: L’Interprétation des rêves dans la région sénégambienne. Suivi de la clef des songes de la Sénégambie de l'Egypte pharaonique et de la tradition islamique by Djibril Samb.
- 2000: Ufundishaji wa Fasihi: Nadharia na Mbinu by Kimani Njogu & Rocha Chimera
- 2001: Odun Ifa/Ifa Festival by Abosede Emanuel
- 2002: The Arabic Novel: Bibliography and Critical Introduction, 1865-1995 by Hamdi Sakkut
- 2003: Walter and Albertina Sisulu. In Our Lifetime by Elinor Sisulu
- 2004: In 2004 the jury decided not to select a winner, but did give four titles Honourable Mention:
  - The Cry of Winnie Mandela by Njabulo Ndebele
  - The Plays of Miracle and Wonder by Brett Bailey
  - Lanre and the Queen of the Stream by Tunde Lawal-Solarin
  - A Dictionary of Yoruba Personal Names by Adeboye Babalola & Olugboyega Alaba
- 2005: La mémoire amputée by Werewere Liking
- 2006: In a Ribbon of Rhythm by Lebogang Mashile
- 2007: Strife by Shimmer Chinodya
- 2008: Beginnings of a Dream by Zachariah Rapola
- 2009: Lawless and Other Stories by Sefi Atta

== See also ==
- Noma Prize
- Noma Literary Prize
- Noma Concours for Picture Book Illustrations
