= Niyi Osundare =

Nigerian writer (born 1947)

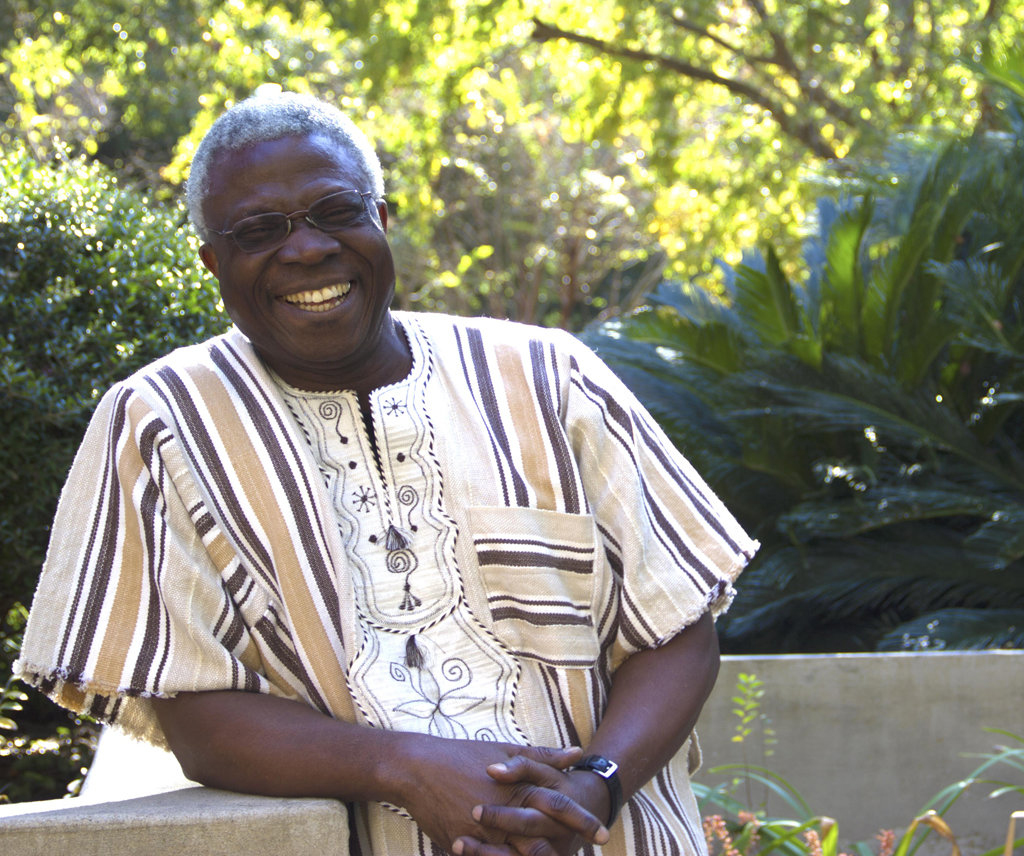
- Born: 12 March 1947 (age 79); Ikere-Ekiti, Nigeria
- Education: Amoye Grammar School, Christ's School, University of Ibadan, University of Leeds, York University
- Occupations: Poet; playwright; literary critic; linguist
- Writing career
- Years active: 1981–present
- Genres: Poetry, plays, literary criticism
- Notable works: Songs of the Marketplace (1983), The Eye of the Earth (1986), Waiting Laughters (1990), Green: Sighs of Our Ailing Planet (2022)
- Notable awards: Association of Nigerian Authors Poetry Prize 1986, 1989, & 1994, Commonwealth Poetry Prize 1986, NOMA Award 1991, Tchicaya U Tam'si Prize for African Poetry 2008, Nigerian National Order of Merit 2014

Niyi Osundare is a Nigerian poet, dramatist, linguist, and literary critic. Born on 12 March 1947, in Ikere-Ekiti, Nigeria, his poetry is influenced by the oral tradition of his Yoruba culture, which he hybridizes with other poetic traditions of the world, including African-American, Latin American, Asian, and European.

== Family and education ==
Osundare gained degrees in English at the University of Ibadan (BA), the University of Leeds (MA), and York University, Canada (PhD, 1979). Previously professor (from 1989) and Head of English (1993–97) at the University of Ibadan, he became professor of English at the University of New Orleans in 1997. Osundare has a wife, Kemi, and three children.

== Career ==
In 1997, he accepted a teaching and research post at the University of New Orleans. In 2005 Osundare was caught in Hurricane Katrina, and he and his wife were stuck in their attic for 26 hours. Their neighbour, who at the time was driving by in his boat, heard their shouts for help. They were rescued and bounced around from rescue shelters until they ended up in Rindge, New Hampshire, where Osundare could get a teaching job as a professor at Franklin Pierce College and things settled down. The experience later informed his poetry collection City Without People, which explores themes of loss, trauma, survival, and recovery.

== Publications ==
- Songs from the Marketplace (1983)
- Village Voices (1984)
- The Eye of the Earth (1986, winner of a Commonwealth Poetry Prize and the poetry prize of the Association of Nigerian Authors)
- A Nib in the Pond (1986)
- Moonsongs (1988)
- Songs of the Season (1999)
- Waiting Laughters (1990, winner of the Noma Award)
- Niyi Osundare: Selected Poems (Heinemann African Poets) (1992)
- Midlife (1993)
- Seize the Day (1995)
- Thread in the Loom: Essays on African Literature and Culture (2002)
- The Word is an Egg (2002)
- Pages from the Book of the Sun: New and Selected Poems (2002)
- The State Visit (2002, play)
- Early Birds: Poems for Junior Secondary, Book One, Book Two, Book Three (2004)
- "Not My Business" in AQA Anthology (2004)
- Two Plays (2005)
- Tender Moments: Love Poems (2006)
- Days (2007)
- City Without People: The Katrina Poems (2011)
- Random Blues (2011)
- Only If the Road Could Talk (2017)
- Snapsongs: Homegroans and Foreignflares (2021)
- Green: Sighs of Our Ailing Planet (2022)- (a sequel to The Eye of the Earth, 1986)

== Themes and style ==
Osundare's poetry is distinguished by its engagement with social justice, political criticism, environmental concerns, and the experiences of ordinary people. Literary critics have identified his work as part of a tradition of socially committed African poetry that addresses corruption, inequality, and the consequences of political misrule.

A notable feature of Osundare's poetry is its incorporation of Yoruba oral traditions, folklore, song, and performance techniques. Scholars have argued that his work combines indigenous expressive forms with modern poetic structures, producing a style that is both accessible and innovative.

Critics have also highlighted Osundare's distinctive use of language, particularly his adaptation of English to reflect African cultural realities and oral performance traditions.

== Documentary ==
In 2016, Osundare, along with his lifelong friend, the Sierra Leonean poet Syl Cheney-Coker, was the subject of a documentary called The Poets, by director Chivas DeVinck. The film follows Osundare and Cheney-Coker on a road-trip through Sierra Leone and Nigeria as they discuss their friendship and how their life experiences have shaped their art.

== Environmental writing ==
Environmental concerns occupy a prominent place in Osundare's poetry. Collections such as The Eye of the Earth explore the relationship between human communities and the natural environment, while later works continue to address ecological degradation and environmental responsibility.

Scholars have described Osundare as an important voice in African ecocriticism, noting his sustained engagement with issues such as deforestation, environmental destruction, and climate-related anxieties.

== Legacy ==
Osundare is widely regarded as one of the leading figures in contemporary African poetry. His work has been the subject of extensive academic study and has influenced subsequent generations of African poets and literary scholars.

His poetry has been studied in relation to language, oral tradition, environmental criticism, political engagement, and postcolonial literary expression, making him one of the most critically examined Nigerian poets of his generation.

== Public engagement ==
In addition to his academic and literary work, Osundare has been active as a newspaper columnist and public commentator. Through essays, interviews, and regular opinion pieces, he has addressed issues relating to democracy, social justice, language, education, and cultural identity in Nigeria.

Osundare's poetry has been translated into several languages, including French, Spanish, Italian, Arabic, Japanese, Korean, Dutch, and Slovenian. His work has been presented at literary festivals, universities, and cultural institutions across Africa, Europe, North America, and Asia.

== Honours and recognition ==
Osundare is the recipient of numerous literary and academic honours. His collection The Eye of the Earth received both the Commonwealth Poetry Prize and the Association of Nigerian Authors Poetry Prize in 1986. His collection Waiting Laughters won the Noma Award for Publishing in Africa in 1991.

In 2014, he was awarded the Nigerian National Order of Merit, Nigeria's highest academic honour, in recognition of his contributions to literature and scholarship.

In 2016, the University of Ibadan conferred on him the honorary degree of Doctor of Literature (D.Litt., honoris causa).

== Relevant literature ==
- Ayinuola, Fortress Isaiah, and Onwuka Edwin. "Yoruba eco-proverbs in English: An eco-critical study of Niyi Osundare's midlife and horses of memory." Journal of Literary Society of Nigeria 6 (2014): 29-40.
- Okunowo, Yomi. "Proverbs as Aesthetics of Meaning in Osundare’s Poetry." The Criterion 3.1:1-21, (2012). Online access
- Oloko, M. Jamiu and Alfred A. Fatuase. "Textuality as Interpretative Paradigm in Niyi Osundare’s The Politician’s Two Mouths." International Journal of Humanitatis Theoreticus Vol. 4. (Issue: 1) 75-83. 2020
