= Demon Slayer: Kimetsu no Yaiba – Sweep the Board =

2024 video game

- Developer: CyberConnect2
- Publishers: JP: Aniplex; WW: Sega
- Series: Demon Slayer: Kimetsu no Yaiba
- Engine: Unreal Engine 4
- Platforms: Nintendo Switch; PlayStation 4; PlayStation 5; Windows; Xbox One; Xbox Series X/S
- Release: Nintendo Switch: JP: April 25, 2024; WW: April 26, 2024; PS4, PS5, Windows, Xbox One, Series X/S: WW: July 16, 2024; JP: July 17, 2024
- Genres: Digital tabletop, party
- Modes: Single-player, multiplayer

Demon Slayer: Kimetsu no Yaiba – Sweep the Board (鬼滅の刃 目指せ！最強隊士！, Kimetsu no Yaiba: Mezase! Saikyō-tai-shi!) is a digital tabletop game developed by CyberConnect2. Based on the 2019 anime adaptation of Koyoharu Gotouge's manga series, Demon Slayer: Kimetsu no Yaiba, the game was released by Aniplex in Japan and Sega worldwide for the Nintendo Switch in April 2024. Versions for PlayStation 4, PlayStation 5, Windows, Xbox One, and Xbox Series X/S were released in July 2024.

== Gameplay and plot ==
The game features online and offline multiplayer support for up to four players, with 14 playable characters in total. The players move around the board, which features day and night cycles, with a range of mini games.

Playable characters:

- Tanjiro Kamado
- Zenitsu Agatsuma
- Inosuke Hashibira
- Giyu Tomioka
- Shinobu Kocho
- Kyojuro Rengoku
- Tengen Uzui
- Muichiro Tokito
- Mitsuri Kanroji
- Obanai Iguro
- Sanemi Shinazugawa
- Gyomei Himejima
- Genya Shinazugawa
- Kanao Tsuyuri

Nezuko Kamado is featured as a supporting character.

== Reception ==
Reception

Aggregate score
Aggregator	Score
OpenCritic	36% recommend

The Nintendo Switch, PlayStation 5, and PC versions of Demon Slayer: Kimetsu no Yaiba – Sweep the Board all received "mixed or average" reviews from critics, according to the review aggregation website Metacritic. In Japan, four critics from Famitsu gave the Switch version of the game a total score of 30 out of 40.
