= Demon Slayer: Kimetsu no Yaiba =

Japanese manga series by Koyoharu Gotouge

- First tankōbon volume cover, featuring siblings Nezuko (left) and Tanjiro Kamado (right)

鬼滅の刃 (Kimetsu no Yaiba)
- Genre: Adventure; Dark fantasy; Martial arts
- Manga
- Written by: Koyoharu Gotouge
- Published by: Shueisha
- English publisher: NA: Viz Media
- Imprint: Jump Comics
- Magazine: Weekly Shōnen Jump
- English magazine: NA: Weekly Shonen Jump
- Original run: February 15, 2016 – May 18, 2020
- Volumes: 23
- Anime television series
- Demon Slayer: Kimetsu no Yaiba (2019–2024)
- Anime films
- Demon Slayer: Kimetsu no Yaiba – The Movie: Mugen Train (2020); Demon Slayer: Kimetsu no Yaiba – The Movie: Infinity Castle (2025)
- Anime compilations
- Demon Slayer: Kimetsu no Yaiba – To the Swordsmith Village (2023); Demon Slayer: Kimetsu no Yaiba – To the Hashira Training (2024)
- Video games
- Demon Slayer: Kimetsu no Yaiba – The Hinokami Chronicles (2021); Demon Slayer: Kimetsu no Yaiba – Sweep the Board (2024); Demon Slayer: Kimetsu no Yaiba – The Hinokami Chronicles 2 (2025)
- icon

Demon Slayer: Kimetsu no Yaiba (Japanese: 鬼滅の刃, Hepburn: Kimetsu no Yaiba; rgh. 'Blade of Demon Destruction') is a Japanese manga series written and illustrated by Koyoharu Gotouge. It was serialized in Shueisha's shōnen manga magazine Weekly Shōnen Jump from February 2016 to May 2020, with its chapters collected in 23 tankōbon volumes. It has been published in English by Viz Media and simultaneously on the Manga Plus platform by Shueisha. It follows teenage Tanjiro Kamado, who joins the Demon Slayer Corps after his family is slaughtered and the sole survivor, his younger sister Nezuko, is turned into a demon, in the hopes of turning her human again.

Its anime television series adaptation, produced by Ufotable, aired a 26-episode first season from April to September 2019, with a sequel film, Demon Slayer: Kimetsu no Yaiba – The Movie: Mugen Train, released in October 2020, which became the highest-grossing anime and Japanese film of all time. An 18-episode second season of the anime series aired from October 2021 to February 2022 while a feature-length compilation, Demon Slayer: Kimetsu no Yaiba – To the Swordsmith Village, was released in theaters in February 2023. An 11-episode third season aired from April to June 2023 while another compilation, Demon Slayer: Kimetsu no Yaiba – To the Hashira Training, was released in theaters in February 2024. An eight-episode fourth season aired from May to June 2024. A film trilogy sequel adapting the "Infinity Castle" story arc premiered in theaters in July 2025.

By July 2025, the manga had over 220 million copies in circulation, including digital versions, making it one of the best-selling manga series of all time; it was the best-selling manga of 2019 and 2020. It has received critical acclaim for its art, storyline, action scenes and characters. The Demon Slayer: Kimetsu no Yaiba franchise is one of the highest-grossing media franchises of all time.

== Synopsis ==
=== Setting ===
In Taishō era Japan, a secret organization known as the "Demon Slayer Corps" has waged a war against demons for centuries. Demons are former humans who possess supernatural abilities such as enhanced strength, rapid regeneration, and unique powers referred to as "Blood Demon Arts". Demons can only be killed if they are exposed to direct sunlight, decapitated with weapons crafted from an alloy called Nichirin, or injected with a poison extracted from wisteria flowers.

In contrast, the Demon Slayers are entirely human but employ specialized elemental breathing techniques known as "Breathing Styles". These techniques grant them superhuman strength, heightened abilities, and increased resilience that enable them to fight demons effectively. The most formidable Demon Slayers are known as the "Hashira" and gain this title through multiple advancements in the Corps' ranks, culminating in killing fifty demons at the highest level or a member of the Twelve Kizuki.

=== Plot ===
Tanjiro Kamado is a kind-hearted and diligent boy who lives with his family in the mountains. After the death of his father, he becomes the sole provider for his household, selling charcoal in nearby villages. He returns home one day to discover his family has been slaughtered by a demon. His younger sister, Nezuko, is the only survivor, though she has been transformed into a demon herself. She exhibits the unusual trait of retaining some human emotion and cognition. The pair are discovered by Giyu Tomioka, the Water Hashira of the Demon Slayer Corps, who sends Tanjiro to be trained by his own former mentor, Sakonji Urokodaki. Tanjiro vows to become a Demon Slayer to avenge his family and find a way to return Nezuko to humanity.

After mastering the "Water Breathing" swordsmanship style, Tanjiro passes the Corps' final selection. Nezuko, who has been placed under a hypnotic suggestion by Urokodaki to suppress her demonic urges, accompanies him. During a mission in Asakusa, they encounter Muzan Kibutsuji, the progenitor of all demons and the one responsible for the murder of their family. They also befriend Tamayo and her assistant Yushiro, two demons who have freed themselves from Muzan's control. Tamayo agrees to develop a cure for Nezuko, a process that requires blood from the powerful Twelve Kizuki, Muzan's most elite subordinates.

Tanjiro and Nezuko are joined in their mission by fellow Demon Slayers Zenitsu Agatsuma and Inosuke Hashibira. Together, they defeat several members of the Twelve Kizuki. During a fierce battle, Tanjiro awakens a mysterious and powerful swordsmanship technique known as "Hinokami Kagura". Their actions draw the attention of the Hashira, the Corps' highest-ranking swordsmen, and they are brought before the organization's leader, Kagaya Ubuyashiki. He sanctions their continued partnership, believing the siblings are pivotal to defeating Muzan.

Muzan, enraged by the failures of his remaining Lower Ranks, executes all of them except for Lower One, who he sends to kill Tanjiro. After a battle aboard a moving train, Tanjiro prevails with the aid of the Flame Hashira, Kyojuro Rengoku, who is subsequently killed by the Upper Three demon, Akaza. The group continues their campaign, assisting the Sound Hashira in defeating the Upper Six siblings and later helping the Mist and Love Hashira eliminate Upper Five and Upper Four at the Swordsmith Village. During these events, Nezuko develops an immunity to sunlight, making her the key to Muzan's goal of overcoming his own fatal weakness. Tanjiro also learns that his Hinokami Kagura is derived from "Sun Breathing", the original swordsmanship style created by Breathing progenitor Yoriichi Tsugikuni.

The Demon Slayer Corps prepares for a final confrontation as Tamayo works on a serum. Muzan launches a preemptive assault, prompting Kagaya to sacrifice himself in a suicide attack. The Hashira engage Muzan, but he traps them within the Infinity Castle, where they must battle the remaining Upper Ranks. Through great sacrifice, the demons Akaza, Doma, and Kokushibo are defeated. Muzan kills Tamayo but is severely weakened by the poison she implanted in him. Forced above ground, a desperate battle ensues as the remaining Demon Slayers fight to hold him until sunrise. Though most of the Hashira perish, Tanjiro delivers the final blow. With his last breath, Muzan transforms Tanjiro into a demon, but Nezuko, now fully human, helps reverse the transformation.

In the aftermath of Muzan's defeat, all demons under his control perish. The Demon Slayer Corps is disbanded, with only two of the active Hashira surviving. Tanjiro and Nezuko return to their mountain home, their journey finally complete. In the ensuing years, Tanjiro marries Kanao Tsuyuri, Inosuke weds Aoi Kanzaki, and Zenitsu marries Nezuko. In a modern-day epilogue, their descendants and reincarnations live in a world free from demons.

== Production ==
After Gotouge's previous manga, Haeniwa no Zigzag, published in Weekly Shōnen Jump in 2015, failed to become a serialized work, Tatsuhiko Katayama, Gotouge's first editor, suggested Gotouge to start a series with an "easy-to-understand theme". Gotouge's debut work Kagarigari would become the basis for an initial draft, titled Kisatsu no Nagare (鬼殺の流れ) since it had concepts like swords and demons, which would be familiar to the Japanese audience. However, due to its serious tone, lack of comic relief, and dark story, this draft was not accepted for serialization, so Katayama asked Gotouge to try writing a brighter, more average character in the same setting. The original title was Kisatsu no Yaiba (鬼殺の刃), but they felt the character satsu (殺; lit. 'kill') in the title was too overt. Although it is a made-up word, "kimetsu" (鬼滅) seemed easy to understand, so Gotouge thought it would be interesting to abbreviate the series' title that way; the word yaiba (刃; lit. 'blade') implies a Japanese sword.

According to Gotouge, the series' three biggest influences are JoJo's Bizarre Adventure, Naruto, and Bleach. Gotouge also drew inspiration from Gintama for the comedy scenes. The series' first editor, Tatsuhiko Katayama, stated that Tanjiro was partially influenced by Himura Kenshin, the protagonist of Rurouni Kenshin.

== Media ==
=== Manga ===
Written and illustrated by Koyoharu Gotouge, Demon Slayer: Kimetsu no Yaiba was serialized in Shueisha's shōnen manga magazine Weekly Shōnen Jump from February 15, 2016, to May 18, 2020. Shueisha collected its chapters in 23 individual tankōbon volumes, released from June 3, 2016, to December 4, 2020.

Shueisha simultaneously published the series in English on the Manga Plus service starting in January 2019. Viz Media published the first three chapters in its digital magazine Weekly Shonen Jump as part of the "Jump Start" program. During their panel at San Diego Comic-Con on July 20, 2017, Viz announced that they had licensed the manga for the North American market. The first volume was released on July 3, 2018.

==== Spin-offs ====
Giyu Tomioka Gaiden (冨岡義勇 外伝, Tomioka Giyū Gaiden), a two-chapter manga spin-off centered on Giyu, was published in Shueisha's Weekly Shōnen Jump on April 1 and 8, 2019. Gotouge is credited with the original work and Ryōji Hirano drew the manga. A side-story for the manga was published in the first issue of Jump Giga on July 20, 2016.

Kimetsu no Aima! (きめつのあいま!), a colored 4-koma spin-off by Ryōji Hirano, was serialized between April 7 and September 29, 2019, on Shueisha's Shonen Jump+ app and website. The manga featured chibi versions of the characters from the main series.

In May 2020, after the main series finished, a spin-off titled Kyojuro Rengoku Gaiden (煉獄外伝, Rengoku Kyōjurō Gaiden), illustrated by Ryōji Hirano and centered on Kyojuro was announced to be released. The two chapters of Rengoku Gaiden were published in Weekly Shōnen Jump on October 12 and 17, 2020. A collected gaiden tankōbon volume, which includes Giyu Tomioka Gaiden, Kyojuro Rengoku Gaiden, and Kimetsu no Aima!, was released on December 4, 2020. Viz Media released the volume, under the title Demon Slayer: Kimetsu no Yaiba ― Stories of Water and Flame, on January 4, 2022.

A 19-page special one-shot chapter written and illustrated by Gotouge, centered on Kyojuro's first mission, was published in Weekly Shōnen Jump on October 5, 2020. An 84-page booklet, titled Rengoku Volume 0, which includes the 19-page one-shot chapter and interviews with the staff and cast of the film, was given to the Demon Slayer: Kimetsu no Yaiba the Movie: Mugen Train theatergoers on October 16, 2020. The booklet had a limited print run of 4.5 million copies.

A spin-off manga series written and illustrated by Natsuki Hokami, titled Demon Slayer: Kimetsu Academy (キメツ学園!, Kimetsu Gakuen!), related to the Kimetsu Gakuen Valentine-hen anime shorts, was serialized in Shueisha's Saikyō Jump magazine from August 4, 2021, to March 4, 2024. Shueisha released six volumes from January 4, 2022, to April 4, 2024. Viz Media has also licensed the manga.

=== Light novels ===
A light novel, titled Demon Slayer: The Flower of Happiness (鬼滅の刃 しあわせの花, Kimetsu no Yaiba Shiawase no Hana), by Gotouge and Aya Yajima, was published in Japan on February 4, 2019. It chronicles the lives of Tanjiro and Zenitsu before the start of the main series, as well as glimpses into the lives of Aoi and Kanao. It also features a single chapter of an alternate universe where the characters attend an ordinary high school. A second light novel, titled Demon Slayer: One-Winged Butterfly (鬼滅の刃 片羽の蝶, Kimetsu no Yaiba Katahane no Chō), by Gotouge and Yajima, was published in Japan on October 4, 2019. It details the lives of Shinobu and her sister Kanae before and soon after they joined the Demon Slayers after Gyomei saved their lives. A third light novel, titled Demon Slayer: Signs from the Wind (鬼滅の刃 風の道しるべ, Kimetsu no Yaiba: Kaze no Michishirube), centered on Sanemi, was published on July 3, 2020. In February 2022, Viz Media announced that they would publish the three light novels in 2022.

=== Other print media ===
A fanbook, Demon Slayer: Kimetsu no Yaiba Official Fanbook: Demon Slaying Corps Memorandum (鬼滅の刃公式ファンブック 鬼殺隊見聞録, Kimetsu no Yaiba Kōshiki Fanbukku Kisatsutai Kenbunroku), was released on July 4, 2019. It features background information on several characters from the series. It also includes the complete three chapters of the initial draft of the series, titled Kisatsu no Nagare (鬼殺の流れ; "Flow of Killing Demons").

A second fanbook, Demon Slayer: Kimetsu no Yaiba Official Fanbook: Demon Slaying Corps Memorandum 2 (鬼滅の刃公式ファンブック 鬼殺隊見聞録・弐, Kimetsu no Yaiba Kōshiki Fanbukku Kisatsutai Kenbunroku Ni), was released on February 4, 2021. It includes three one-shot chapters: "Tanjirō no Kinkyō Hōkokusho" (炭治郎の近況報告書; "Report on Tanjiro's Present Condition"), which is about Tanjiro and other characters after the manga's conclusion; "Totsugeki!! Jigoku no Onishuzai ~Sanzunokawa o Koete~" (突撃!! 地獄の鬼取材～三途の川を越えて～, Breaking! Hell Demon Report ~Crossing the Far Shore~), which shows some of the demons from "that time"; and "Kimetsu no Dodai" (鬼滅の土台; "The Foundation of Kimetsu"), which shows some of Gotouge's real stories from drawing the manga during its serialization. It also includes the previously published one-shot chapter "Rengoku Volume 0", previously given out as a bonus for theatergoers for Demon Slayer: Kimetsu no Yaiba the Movie: Mugen Train in 2020, and the "Nenshi Bangai-hen" (年始番外編; "New Year extra edition") and "Nenmatsu Bangai-hen" (年末番外編; "Year-end extra edition") one-shots, published in Weekly Shōnen Jump in 2020 and 2019, respectively. It also includes the one-shot 'Micchaku! "Kimetsu Gakuen" ni Kayou Tanjiro no 1-nichi' (密着！"キメツ学園"に通う炭治郎の1日; "Closer Look! A Day of Tanjiro Attending Kimetsu University") which was published in Jump Giga 2018 Winter Vol.3 in 2018.

An art book, titled Demon Slayer: Kimetsu no Yaiba – Koyoharu Gotouge Artbook: Ikuseisо (鬼滅の刃 吾峠呼世晴画集―幾星霜―, Kimetsu no Yaiba Gotōge Koyoharu Gashū Ikuseiso), was released on February 4, 2021.

=== Anime ===
A 26-episode first season of an anime television series adaptation by studio Ufotable, directed by Haruo Sotozaki and produced by Hikaru Kondo, was broadcast from April 6 to September 28, 2019.

A second season, with the first part adapting the "Mugen Train" story arc, aired for seven episodes from October 10 to November 28, 2021. The second part of the season, adapting the "Entertainment District" story arc, aired for eleven episodes from December 5, 2021, to February 13, 2022.

A third season, covering the "Swordsmith Village" story arc, aired from April 9 to June 18, 2023. A fourth season, covering the "Hashira Training" story arc, aired from May 12 to June 30, 2024.

==== Compilation films ====
Prior to airing, the first five episodes screened theatrically in Japan for two weeks from March 29, 2019, under the title Demon Slayer: Kimetsu no Yaiba: Sibling's Bond (鬼滅の刃 兄妹の絆, Kimetsu no Yaiba: Kyōdai no Kizuna).

A compilation film, Demon Slayer: Kimetsu no Yaiba – To the Swordsmith Village, which includes the 10th and 11th episodes of the Entertainment District arc and an advanced screening of the first "Swordsmith Village" arc episode, premiered in Japan on February 3, 2023.

Another compilation film, Demon Slayer: Kimetsu no Yaiba – To the Hashira Training, which includes the two final episodes of Swordsmith Village and an advanced screening of the first Hashira Training episode, premiered in Japan on February 2, 2024, with a wide theatrical release in the United States on February 23 of the same year.

==== Films ====
A film, titled Demon Slayer: Kimetsu no Yaiba – The Movie: Mugen Train, premiered in Japan on October 16, 2020.

A film trilogy adapting the "Infinity Castle" story arc premiered in Japan on July 18, 2025.

=== Video games ===
A video game based on the series was announced in 2020. Titled Demon Slayer: Kimetsu no Yaiba – The Hinokami Chronicles (鬼滅の刃 ヒノカミ血風譚, Kimetsu no Yaiba Hinokami Keppūtan), it is developed by CyberConnect2, and published by Aniplex. The game was released for the PlayStation 4, PlayStation 5, Xbox One, Xbox Series X and Series S, and Steam on October 14, 2021, in Japan. Sega published the game worldwide for the same platforms on October 15, 2021. It was released for the Nintendo Switch on June 9, 2022. In December 2024, a sequel was announced. Titled Demon Slayer: Kimetsu no Yaiba – The Hinokami Chronicles 2 (鬼滅の刃 ヒノカミ血風譚2, Kimetsu no Yaiba Hinokami Keppūtan Ni), the game was released for the same platforms as its predecessor on August 1, 2025, in Japan, and on August 5 in English-speaking territories.

A mobile game titled Kimetsu no Yaiba: Keppū Kengeki Royale (鬼滅の刃 血風剣戟ロワイアル) was announced to be released in 2020 by publisher Aniplex with development by Aniplex subsidiary Quatro A. In December 2020, it was announced that the game's release was delayed indefinitely to improve its quality.

Demon Slayer: Kimetsu no Yaiba – Sweep the Board, a digital tabletop game was released for the Nintendo Switch in April 2024; it was released for the PlayStation 5, PlayStation 4, Xbox Series X and Series S, Xbox One, and Steam in July of the same year.

=== Stage plays ===
A stage play adaptation of the manga was announced by Weekly Shōnen Jump in September 2019. The stage play was performed from January 18–26 in Tokyo at the Tennōzu Ginga Gekijō and from January 31 to February 2, 2020, in Hyōgo Prefecture at the AiiA 2.5 Theater Kobe. Kenichi Suemitsu scripted and directed the play and Shunsuke Wada composed the music. The cast includes Ryota Kobayashi as the protagonist Tanjirō Kamado, Akari Takaishi as his sister Nezuko, Keisuke Ueda as Zenitsu Agatsuma, Yūgo Satō as Inosuke Hashibira, Reo Honda as Giyū Tomioka, Tomoyuki Takagi as Sakonji Urokodaki, Mimi Maihane as Tamayo, Hisanori Satō as Yushirō, and Yoshihide Sasaki as the main antagonist Muzan Kibutsuji. A second stage play adaptation was announced at the Jump Festa '21 event in December 2020, with the cast and staff returning. Titled Demon Slayer: Kimetsu no Yaiba the 2nd: Bonds, it ran in Tokyo from August 7–15, in Osaka from August 20–22, and again in Tokyo from August 27–31, 2021.

A traditional Noh-Kyōgen stage play was announced at the Jump Festa '22 in December 2021. It ran from July 26–31 at the Kanze Noh Theater in Tokyo and from December 9–11, 2022 at the Ohtsuki Noh Theater in Osaka. The cast includes Ohtsuki Yuichi as Tanjiro Kamado and his younger sister Nezuko, Ohtsuki Bunzo as Rui, and Nomura Mansai, who is also a stage director, played as Muzan Kibutsuji. A third stage play adaptation based on the manga's "Mugen Train" arc was announced by Weekly Shōnen Jump in January 2022. Titled Demon Slayer: Kimetsu no Yaiba The Stage Part 3: Mugen Dream Train, it was performed on September 10 and 11 at the Tokyo Dome City Hall in Tokyo, at Kyoto Theater in Kyoto from September 16–25, and again at the Tokyo Dome City Hall from October 15–23, 2022.

A fourth stage play adaptation based on the manga's "Entertainment District" story arc was announced in April 2023. Titled Demon Slayer: Kimetsu no Yaiba The Stage Part 4: Sneaking into the Entertainment District, it ran in Osaka from November 11–19 and Tokyo from December 1–10, 2023. The cast and staff are returning to reprise their roles, with Shogo Sakamoto played as Tanjiro Kamado. A Kabuki play of the manga was announced in October 2022. Titled Demon Slayer: Kimetsu no Yaiba Super Kabuki II, it is scheduled to run in Tokyo from February to March 2024. However, due to "various circumstances" about an actor, planned performances were postponed.

A fifth stage play adaptation based on the manga's "Swordsmith Village" story arc was announced in December 2024. Titled Demon Slayer: Kimetsu no Yaiba The Stage Part 5: Assault on the Swordsmith Village, it ran in Tokyo from April 11–20 and Hyōgo from April 25–27, 2025. A sixth stage play adaptation based on the manga's "Hashira Training" story arc was announced in November 2025, with Shogo Sakamoto and Fu Takahashi stars in a double role as Tanjiro. In February 2026, the original title Demon Slayer: Kimetsu no Yaiba The Stage Part 6: Hashira Training was changed to Hashira Training-Infinity Castle Penetration, which also depicts the battle within the Infinity Castle. The play is set to run in Tokyo from June 13–28, 2026.

=== Other media ===
A collaborative kabuki exhibition featuring the characters from the series was held at Kyōto's Minami-za theater from November 6–23, 2020. An art exhibition of the series ran in Tokyo's Mori Arts Center Gallery from October 26 to December 12, 2021. The exhibition displayed numerous artworks drawn by Gotouge and also sold original goods. The exhibition ran in the Grand Front Osaka from July 14 to September 4, 2022.

From September 17, 2021, to February 13, 2022, Universal Studios Japan hosted attractions based on the series, including the "Demon Slayer XR Ride". Other attractions include the "Hollywood Dream the Ride" and Demon Slayer Corps special training sessions. Universal Studios Japan again hosted the "Demon Slayer XR Ride" attraction from February 1 to June 6, 2024. From July 19, 2024, to January 5, 2025, the theme park opened two attractions, including "Race to Swordsmith Village" XR Ride and Hashira Training Arc's "Hollywood Dream the Ride".

An immersive exhibition, titled Demon Slayer: Kimetsu no Yaiba Total Concentration Exhibition, was originally slated to be held at the Araneta City in Quezon City, Philippines, starting on July 20, 2024; however, the event was rescheduled, and ran at the same venue from August 3 to October 27 of the same year.

Prior to Major League Baseball's 2025 Tokyo Series between the Los Angeles Dodgers and Chicago Cubs, the league collaborated to produce a short anime film of the series which featured both teams' Japanese players: Shohei Ohtani and Yoshinobu Yamamoto for the Dodgers, and Shota Imanaga and Seiya Suzuki for the Cubs.

== Reception ==
=== Popularity and cultural impact ===
In 2020, the Demon Slayer: Kimetsu no Yaiba franchise generated an estimated annual sales revenue of ¥1 trillion ($8.75 billion). In January 2021, it was reported that Japanese sales of print books and magazines fell 1% in 2020 compared to the previous year, being the smallest per-year decline since 2006. This small decline was attributed to an increase in reading in Japan due to the COVID-19 pandemic and the "successful boom" of the Demon Slayer: Kimetsu no Yaiba manga and its related media. According to CharaBiz, a database for character licensing business in Japan, Demon Slayer: Kimetsu no Yaiba was the highest-grossing franchise of 2020, surpassing other well-known franchises such as Anpanman, Pokémon, Mickey Mouse and Peanuts (Snoopy).

According to a 2020 internet poll conducted by Oricon Monitor Research, over 90% of the Japanese public is familiar with Demon Slayer: Kimetsu no Yaiba; 40.5% said that they were "very familiar" and 57.3% said that they were "familiar with the name", indicating that 97.8% knew the existence of the series. Of the 1,558 respondents who said that they were "very familiar", 1,182 respondents "like" or "very liked" the series. To the question of "what part of the series do you like?", the series' story was the most popular aspect with 76.4% votes, followed by the setting with 49.3% and the relatability of the characters with 45.3% votes. 31% of the fans said that they owned the manga, and of the 66.1% of those fans said they owned every volume. According to multiple respondents, the series helped them treasure and connect with their families and allowed people of different generations to connect even in the workplace and beyond. The poll was responded from November 18–24 by 3,848 members of Oricon Monitor Research, ranging from people in their teens to their sixties. The series helped to increase internal tourism, with many tourists traveling to spots similar to the ones featured in the series. It has been featured in Japanese high school textbooks starting in 2022.

Regarding the series' sudden huge success, Weekly Shōnen Jump editor-in-chief Hiroyuki Nakano stated that the manga sales shot up straight after its anime adaptation finished, explaining that a large number of people watched the series through streaming services after it ended rather than watching it weekly. Nakano also stated that it is harder for a manga series running in the magazine to become a hit, and Demon Slayer: Kimetsu no Yaiba, despite having started in February 2016, did not become a major hit until late 2019, adding that its success "hinged on word of mouth generated after the anime's run". Nakan also said that it introduced many new people and audiences to Jump. On December 20, 2020, at the Jump Festa '21, Mayumi Tanaka, voice actress of One Piece's Monkey D. Luffy, read aloud a message from One Piece creator Eiichiro Oda, in which he praised Gotouge's series, and wrote: "At Jump, Demon Slayer was really amazing. I enjoyed how it was able to save the feelings of so many people. Absolutely superb work. This is how I want manga to be. It touched me, somehow!"

Yusuke Murata said that the series' contribution to the industry as a whole is immeasurable, while Gege Akutami commented that the series created many new manga fans. The then-prime minister of Japan, Fumio Kishida, has claimed to be a fan of the series, pledging that he would improve the conditions in the manga and anime industry. Several politicians even used motifs and patterns from the series in their campaigns in 2021.

=== Sales ===
Demon Slayer: Kimetsu no Yaiba is one of the best-selling manga series of all time. By February 2019, the series had 3.5 million copies in circulation worldwide; over 10 million copies in circulation by September 2019; over 25 million copies in circulation by December 2019; and over 40 million copies in circulation by February 2020. By the end of February 2020, it was revealed that the franchise has sold 40.3 million copies, making it the fifth best-selling manga in Oricon's history. On May 6, 2020, the franchise recorded over 60 million copies in circulation (including digital copies). On May 22, 2020, it was revealed that the series has sold 60.027 million physical print copies, making it the third series in Oricon's history to sell over 60 million physical print copies. In July 2020, the franchise recorded over 80 million copies in circulation, including 71 million physical print copies sold. With the release of volume 22 on October 2, 2020, the franchise recorded 100 million copies in circulation, including 90.518 million physical print copies sold, making it the ninth Weekly Shōnen Jump series to reach 100 million copies in circulation, after KochiKame, Fist of the North Star, Dragon Ball, JoJo's Bizarre Adventure, Slam Dunk, One Piece, Naruto, and Bleach. (Note: According to Anime News Network, it was the eighth Weekly Shōnen Jump title to reach 100 million copies in circulation; however, they did not include Fist of the North Star, another Weekly Shōnen Jump series that had reached the milestone.) In December 2020, the series recorded over 120 million copies in circulation (including digital copies), with 102.892 million physical copies sold, making Demon Slayer: Kimetsu no Yaiba the second manga series to sell over 100 million copies in Oricon's records after One Piece, which achieved this feat in 2012. In February 2021, the manga recorded over 150 million copies in circulation (including digital copies). In July 2025, the manga recorded over 220 million copies in circulation (including digital copies), with 164 million in Japan and 56 million overseas.

In February 2020, the 19th volume sold an estimated 1.378 million copies in its first week, making Demon Slayer: Kimetsu no Yaiba the third manga series to have a single print volume sell more than 1 million copies in its first week, after One Piece (45 times) and Attack on Titan (2 times). In May 2020, the regular and limited editions of the 20th volume sold a total of 1,990,249 physical print copies. In July 2020, the regular and limited editions of volume 21 sold a total of 2,041,177 physical print copies. In October 2020, volume 22 ranked first in Oricon's manga sales chart for four consecutive weeks, with 326,000 physical print copies sold. In December 2020, the 23rd and final volume sold 2.855 million copies in its first week, the most that any manga volume has sold in one week in Oricon's history. In January 2021, it was reported that volumes 8, 1, and 7 of the series sold cumulative totals of 5.03 million, 5.029 million, and 5.009 million copies, respectively, being the first manga volumes to sell over 5 million copies in Oricon's history. The 23rd and final volume is the first manga volume to sell over 4 million copies in Oricon's half-year sales ranking charts since Oricon began posting rankings in 2008. By May 2021, nineteen volumes in the series had each sold over 5 million copies. The Stories of Water and Flame volume is Shueisha's first spin-off volume with an initial print run of 1 million copies.

In November 2019, Shueisha stated that Demon Slayer: Kimetsu no Yaiba was their second best-selling manga in 2019, with 10.8 million volumes sold, second only to One Piece, with 12.7 million volumes sold in the same period. Nevertheless, the series ranked first in 2019 Oricon's annual manga ranking chart, with over 12 million copies sold, while One Piece ranked second, with over 10.1 million copies sold, making Demon Slayer: Kimetsu no Yaiba the best-selling manga of 2019. (Note: Oricon does not count digital copies of manga.) Oda wrote a message congratulating Gotouge' achievement.

Demon Slayer: Kimetsu no Yaiba was the first series to take all top 10 positions of Oricon's weekly manga chart. The manga occupied the entire top 10 for a full month, and it was also the first series in Oricon's history to occupy the entire top 19 weekly rank. In October 2020, the twenty-two volumes, at the time, of the series occupied the top 22 spots of Oricon's weekly manga chart. It was the best-selling manga for the first half of 2020, with 45,297,633 copies sold, and its twenty volumes (including a special edition of volume 20) at the time, were among the top 25 best-selling manga volumes of 2020. Demon Slayer: Kimetsu no Yaiba's first twenty-two volumes were the best-selling manga volumes of 2020, making the series as well the best-selling manga series in 2020, with 82,345,447 copies sold. It was the best-selling manga series in the first half of 2021, with over 26 million copies sold, while four of its volumes (volumes 18, 19, 22, and 23), Stories of Water and Flame, and the first fanbook were among the 25 best-selling manga volumes. It was the second best-selling manga in 2021 with over 29.5 million copies sold, while volume 23 and Stories of Water and Flame were the first and second, respectively, best-selling manga volumes. The second fanbook and four other manga volumes were among the top 30 best-selling volumes.

In North America, the volumes of Demon Slayer: Kimetsu no Yaiba were ranked on Circana (formerly NPD) BookScan's monthly top 20 adult graphic novels list since September 2019. They were also ranked on The New York Times' monthly Graphic Books and Manga bestseller list since February 2020. According to ICv2, Demon Slayer: Kimetsu no Yaiba was the best-selling manga franchise for Q4 2021 (September–December) in the United States, and it was also the second "most efficient manga franchise" for retailer bookshelves, based on the website's calculations of which manga franchises had the highest sales per volume. According to NPD BookScan, two manga volumes of Demon Slayer: Kimetsu no Yaiba were ranked among the top 20 adult graphic novels list in 2020; four volumes were among the top 20 highest-selling manga volumes in 2021; three volumes and Stories of Water and Flame were among the top 20 highest-selling manga volumes in 2022; its first volume was the best-selling manga series in 2023, with the second volume also featured on the top 20 highest-selling manga volumes. By May 2021, the Viz Media edition had over 4 million copies in circulation.

=== Critical response ===
Before the premiere of its anime series adaptation, Nicholas Dupree of Anime News Network included the series on his list of "The Most Underrated Shonen Jump Manga", and wrote: "Kimetsu is still arguably an oddity in Jump, but it's firmly established its style that's certainly worth looking out for." Rebecca Silverman of the same website gave the first volume B− rating. Silverman praised the plot ideas and characters but had issues with its pacing. She labeled Gotouge's art as "unpolished and inconsistent", although she commended details such as those in Tanjiro and Nezuko's clothing which illustrate both the poverty and loving environment from which they come. Silverman concluded by saying that it was the work of a promising author and had positive expectations for the series' development.

Leroy Douresseaux of Comic Book Bin gave the first volume a score of 9/10. He commended the series for its "ability to convey power in simplicity," explaining that Gotouge's art is "nice" but overly detailed, and the dialogue and exposition are straightforward. Douresseaux praised its characters and recommended the series to fans of demon-fighting heroes. Nick Smith of ICv2 gave the first volume a score of 4/5. He wrote that the story is well crafted and the characters intriguing, but the setting is "too deadly for the survival of the human race." Smith said that the artwork is good but not special and recommended the series to "teens and adults who like heroes fighting back against horrific evil." Che Gilson of Otaku USA praised the series for its plot, action and character development. Gilson said that the art was "stiff", but that instead of looking like rough drawings or traced photo composites, the series "looks as if it were carved and printed from woodblocks." Gilson concluded: "With an engrossing plot and characters, Volume 1 builds to a cliffhanger that makes it hard to wait for the next volume." Chris Beveridge of The Fandom Post criticized the first chapter for being "overly wordy when just the action would suffice," and ultimately called it "a work-in-progress series." After having watched the anime adaptation, Melina Dargis of the same website was so fascinated by the story and characters that she decided to go back and review the second volume of the manga. Despite knowing what would happen, Dargis wrote that it was "still such a delight to relive it again" and concluded; "It's a really great story and appeals to a wide variety of interests."

Manga artists have lauded the series; Yoshihiro Togashi wrote a praising comment featured on the obi of series fourth volume; Osamu Akimoto wrote a praising comment featured on the obi of the series' fifth volume; and Takayuki Yamaguchi praised the series and recommended it in a 2018 interview, around the time of its tenth volume. Author Kinoko Nasu called it one of his favorite new manga works. Comedian and novelist Naoki Matayoshi also praised the series. Nobuyuki Izumi of Real Sound compared the series' premise, setting, and structure to Hirohiko Araki's JoJo's Bizarre Adventure's first two parts, Phantom Blood and Battle Tendency, and to Kazuhiro Fujita's Ushio & Tora.

=== Accolades ===
Demon Slayer: Kimetsu no Yaiba ranked fourteenth on the "Nationwide Bookstore Employees' Recommended Comics of 2017" poll by Honya Club online bookstore. On Takarajimasha's Kono Manga ga Sugoi! ranking of top 20 manga for male readers, the series ranked nineteenth on the 2018 list, sixth on the 2019 list, and seventeenth on the 2020 list. On the Rakuten Kobo 2020 First Half Ranking, the series was first in every demographic group, from male and female teenagers to older adults. In 2020, Gotouge received the second Kodansha's Noma Publishing Culture Award, which honors those who have contributed to "reinventing publishing". Gotouge received the award due to the franchise's sales, which have boosted the entire publishing industry from 2019 to 2020. It ranked sixteenth, along with Chainsaw Man, on "The Best Manga 2021 Kono Manga wo Yome!" ranking by Freestyle magazine. On TV Asahi's Manga Sōsenkyo 2021 poll, in which 150,000 people voted for their top 100 manga series, Demon Slayer: Kimetsu no Yaiba ranked second, only behind One Piece.

==== Awards and nominations ====
| Year | Award | Category | Result | Ref. |
|---|---|---|---|---|
| 2017 | 1st Tsutaya Comic Awards | Anime Hope Division | 3rd place | |
| 2018 | Da Vinci 18th Annual Book of the Year | Book of the Year | 30th place | |
| 2019 | Da Vinci 19th Annual Book of the Year | Book of the Year | 10th place | |
| 2020 | BookWalker Awards | Grand Prize | Won | |
| 2020 | Piccoma Awards | Luna Category | Won | |
| 2020 | Da Vinci 20th Annual Book of the Year | Book of the Year | Won | |
| 2020 | 24th Tezuka Osamu Cultural Prize | Cultural Prize | Nominated | |
| 2021 | 25th Tezuka Osamu Cultural Prize | Cultural Prize | Nominated | |
| 2021 | 25th Tezuka Osamu Cultural Prize | Special Prize | Won | |
| 2021 | 50th Japan Cartoonists Association Award | Grand Prize | Won | |
| 2021 | Ridibooks Comic Award | Grand Prix | Won | |
| 2021 | Da Vinci 21st Annual Book of the Year | Book of the Year | Won | |
| 2021 | 52nd Seiun Awards | Best Comic | Nominated | |

=== Light novels and other print books ===
In 2019, Demon Slayer: Flower of Happiness had about 210,966 copies sold, and Demon Slayer: One-Winged Butterfly had about 196,674 copies sold. Both novels ranked third and fourth respectively in Oricon's overall bunko ranking chart. Demon Slayer: Kimetsu no Yaiba overall novelization was the tenth best-selling light novel in 2019, with 407,640 copies sold. In February 2020, after a planned reprint collectively 1.16 million copies were in circulation, making the books the fastest franchise novel in Shueisha's "Jump J-Books" label to reach 1 million copies in circulation. The two light novels were the best-selling novels of the first half of 2020, collectively selling a total of 1,199,863 copies. The Demon Slayer: Kimetsu no Yaiba overall novelization was the best-selling light novel of 2020, with 2,752,593 copies sold. The Demon Slayer: Kimetsu no Yaiba overall novelization was the best-selling novel series in the first half of 2021, collectively selling a total of 651,358 copies, while the three novels and the Demon Slayer: Kimetsu no Yaiba the Movie: Mugen Train novelization (and its "Mirai bunko" edition), were among the best-selling-novel volumes in the first half of 2021. The three light novels were among the top 5 best-selling light novel volumes of 2021, while the overall novelization was the best-selling light novel, with 776,320 copies sold.

Four other books were among the best-selling general books of 2021: the art book, Demon Slayer: Kimetsu no Yaiba – Koyoharu Gotouge Artbook: Ikuseisо, was third with 491,007 copies sold; Demon Slayer: Kimetsu no Yaiba – Coloring Book: Blue was seventh, with 414,523 copies sold; Demon Slayer: Kimetsu no Yaiba – Coloring Book: Red was ninth with 370,460 copies sold; and the anime's third official characters book was thirteenth, with 278,531 copies sold. Due to sales of the novels and the other books, Gotouge was second on the general book ranking chart of 2021, with over 1.4 million copies sold. In May 2020, Demon Slayer: Flower of Happiness ranked tenth in a favorite children's book poll conducted by the Children's Book Election Office, among over 250,000 elementary school children.
