= African nationalism =

Group of political ideologies

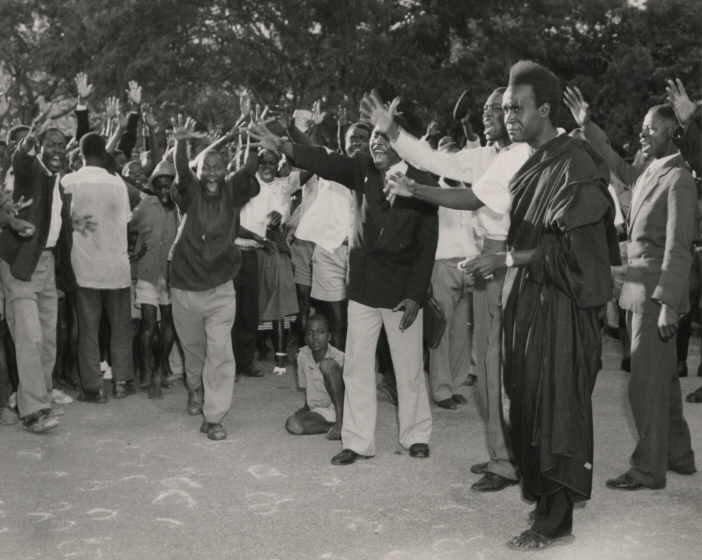
Kenneth Kaunda, a leading Zambian independence activist, pictured at a political rally in Northern Rhodesia (now Zambia) in 1960.

African nationalism is an umbrella term which refers to a group of political ideologies in the majority of Africa, which are based on the idea of national self-determination and the creation of nation states. The ideology emerged under European colonial rule during the 19th and 20th centuries and was loosely inspired by nationalist ideas from Europe. Originally, African nationalism was based on demands for self-determination and played an important role in forcing the process of decolonisation of Africa (c. 1957–66). However, the term refers to a broad range of different ideological and political movements and should not be confused with Pan-Africanism which may seek the federation of many or all nation states in Africa.

== History ==
Nationalist ideas in Africa emerged during the mid-19th century among the emerging black middle classes in West Africa. Early nationalists hoped to overcome ethnic fragmentation by creating nation-states. In its earliest period, it was inspired by African-American and Afro-Caribbean intellectuals from the Back-to-Africa movement who imported nationalist ideals current in Europe and the Americas at the time. The early African nationalists were elitist and believed in the supremacy of Western culture but sought a greater role for themselves in political decision-making. They rejected African traditional religions and tribalism as "primitive" and embraced western ideas of Christianity, modernity, and the nation state. However, one of the challenges encountered by nationalists in unifying their nation after European rule were the divisions of tribes and the formation of ethnicism.

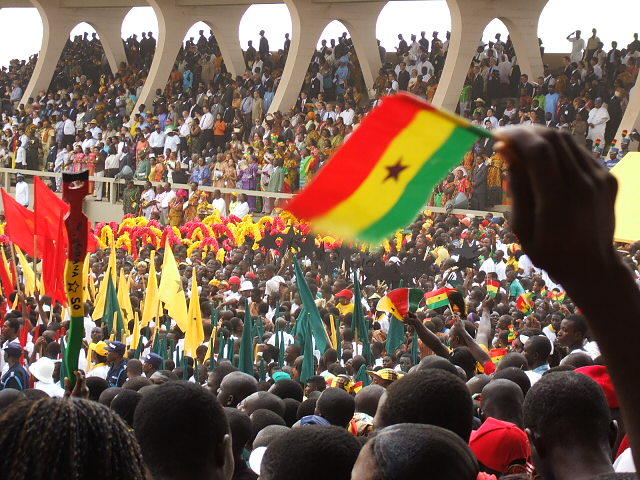
Ghanaian nationalists celebrating the 50th anniversary of national independence in 2007

African nationalism first emerged as a mass movement in the years after World War II as a result of wartime changes in the nature of colonial rule as well as social change in Africa itself. Nationalist political parties were established in almost all African colonies during the 1950s, and their rise was an important reason for the decolonisation of Africa between c.1957 and 1966. However, African nationalism was never a single movement, and political groups considered to be African nationalists varied by economic orientation and degrees of radicalism and violence. Nationalists leaders struggled to find their own social and national identity following the European influence that controlled the political landscape during the colonial occupation.

African nationalism in the colonial era was often framed purely in opposition to colonial rule and was therefore frequently unclear or contradictory about its other objectives. According to historian Robert I. Rotberg, African nationalism would not have emerged without colonialism. Its relation to Pan-Africanism was also ambiguous, with many nationalist leaders professing Pan-African loyalties but still refusing to commit to supranational unions. African nationalists of the period have also been criticised for their continued use of ideas and policies associated with colonial states. In particular, nationalists usually attempted to preserve national frontiers created arbitrarily under colonial rule after independence and create a national sense of national identity among the heterogeneous populations inside them.

== Tribalism and ethnic nationalism ==
African nationalism exists in an uneasy relationship with tribalism and sub-national ethnic nationalism which differ in their conceptions of political allegiance. Many Africans distinguish between their ethnic and national identities. Some nationalists have argued that tribes were a colonial creation.

== Women in African nationalism ==
During the late 1950s and 1960s, scholars of African nationalist struggles primarily focused on the Western-educated male elites who led the nationalist movements and assumed power after independence. The history of studies of women's involvement in African nationalist struggle, mobilization, and party politics can be traced along intellectual and political paths that initially followed, later paralleled, but have seldom deviated from or led the course of Africanist historiography. The goal of these women involved in the African nationalism movement was to recover Africa's past and to celebrate the independent emergence of independent Africa. It was necessary to raise awareness of this cause, calling to the new emerging generation of African women, raised in a better, more stable society. Although the challenges they encountered seemed increasingly more significant, they, however, had it better than past generations, allowing them to raise awareness of the African Nationalist moment. Whereas women's historians interested in effecting changes in the process and production of American or European history had to fight their way onto trains that had been moving through centuries on well-worn gauges, the "new" Africanist train had barely left the station in the early '60s. With a few exceptions, scholars have devoted little more than a passing mention of the presence of African women as conscious political actors in African nationalism. Anne McClintock has stressed that "all nationalisms are gendered." Undoubtedly, women played a significant role in arousing national consciousness as well as elevating their own political and social position through African nationalism. It is with this in mind, that both feminism and the research of these women become critical to the re-evaluation of the history of African nationalism. In 1943, a prominent organization called the African National Congress Women's League used its branches throughout the continent to build an international campaign.

=== Women in national organisations ===
As leaders and activists, women participated in African nationalism through national organisations. The decade of the 1950s was a landmark because of the significant number of women who were politically involved in the nationalist struggle. A minority of women were incorporated and affiliated into male-dominated national organisations. Founded by women in 1960, The National Council of Sierra Leone was to become, in 1968, the women's section of the ruling All People's Congress and dedicated primarily to the vigorous support of head of state, President Stevens. Women activists extended and conveyed militant behaviours. Nancy Dolly Steele was the organizing secretary and co-founder of the Congress, and has been noted for her militant political and nationalist activities. In the same way, throughout Africa, the influence of trade union movements, in particular, became the spawning ground for women organisers as such. South African women, for instance, emerged as primary catalysts for protests against the Apartheid regime. These women first participated in resistance movements through women's branches of the larger male-dominated liberation organizations, as through the African National Congress (ANC). Nevertheless, in 1943, the ANC adopted a new constitution which included a new position for women to become full members of the national movement. Women also formed their own national organisations, such as the Federation of South African Women in 1954, which boasted a membership of 230,000 women. Though at the time women viewed themselves primarily as mothers and wives, the act of their joining in political organisations illustrated a kind of feminist consciousness.

=== Women as national leaders ===
Women were fundamental nationalist leaders in their own right. Under the inspiration of Bibi Titi Mohammed, a former singer in Dar es Salaam who became a Tanganyikan nationalist, Tanzanian women were organised into a Women's Section of the Tanganyikan African National Union. Mohammed, who was semi-illiterate, was an impressive orator and later combined her nationalist work in the 1950s with her political ambitions. She was one of the most visible Tanganyikan nationalists during the struggle against colonialism and imperialism. She was the only nationalist leader, besides Julius Nyerere, who was recognized across the country at the time of Tanzanian independence. Her legacy as a leader, speaker, organiser and activist is testimony to the pivotal role played by many uneducated women in spreading a national consciousness, a political awareness and securing independence from British rule in Tanzania.

=== Women and Informal Methods of Protest ===
Whilst some female-oriented initiatives may have been conceived and presented to women by male party-leaders, others were clearly created by women themselves. These women used nationalism as a platform to address their own concerns as wives, mothers, industrial workers, peasants, and as women affiliated to the ANC. The 1940s Anti-tax protest in Tanzania involved the women of Peasant Pare, where women employed methods of direct confrontation, provocative language and physical violence. Explicit use of sexual insult was also central to the powerful Anlu protest of the Cameroon in 1958, where women refused to implement agricultural regulations that would have undermined their farming system. In the same way, women used music, dance and informal methods to convey their solidarity for African nationalism. The production of Tanganyikan nationalism in Tanzania can be seen as “woman’s work,” where women evoked, created and performed nationalism through their dances and songs. Equally, women were considered the best sloganeers, as traditional story-tellers and singers using ideas, images and phrases that appealed to the non-elite population. Market women in coastal Nigeria and Guinea also used their networks to convey anti-government information. ‘Ordinary’ women themselves had transformed "traditional" methods for networking and expressing disapproval against individuals, into mechanisms for challenging and unsettling the local colonial administration. However, although these women contributed to African nationalist politics, they had limited impact as their strategies were concerned with shaming, retaliation, restitution and compensation, and were not directly about radical transformation. This problem was a reflection of the extent to which most African women had already been marginalized politically, economically and educationally under colonial regimes in Africa.

== By country ==
=== Gambia ===
In the Gambia, one of the prominent Gambian nationalists and Pan-Africanists during the colonial era was Alieu Ebrima Cham Joof. From the 1950s up to Gambia's independence, Cham Joof (as he is commonly referred to), held a series of campaigns against the British colonial administration. In 1958, he spearheaded the All Party Committee – the purpose of which was for self-governance and to determine the political direction of the Gambia free from European colonialism and neo-colonialism. In 1959, he organized the Bread and Butter demonstration from outside his house in Barthurst now Banjul, and led his followers to Government House to lobby the British colonial administration. Following that demonstration, Cham Joof and his associates Crispin Grey Johnson and M. B. Jones were indicted as "inciting the public to disobey the laws of the land" and charged as political prisoners.'

=== South Africa ===
The African National Congress (ANC) is a political party in South Africa. It originated as a liberation movement known for its opposition to apartheid and has governed the country since 1994, when the first post-apartheid election resulted in Nelson Mandela being elected as President of South Africa.

Founded on 8 January 1912 in Bloemfontein as the South African Native National Congress, the organization was formed to advocate for the rights of black South Africans. When the National Party government came to power in 1948, the ANC's central purpose became to oppose the new government's policy of institutionalized apartheid.

In the post-apartheid era, the ANC continues to identify itself foremost as a liberation movement, although it is also a registered political party.

== See also ==
General

- African Nationalist Movement
- African socialism
- African Union
- Green resistance
- Organisation of African Unity
- Types of nationalism

By state

- Ethiopian nationalism
- Congolese nationalism
- Nigerian nationalism

By ethnicity

- Somali nationalism
- Igbo nationalism
- Amhara nationalism
