= Kimani Njogu =

Kenyan linguist (born 1953)

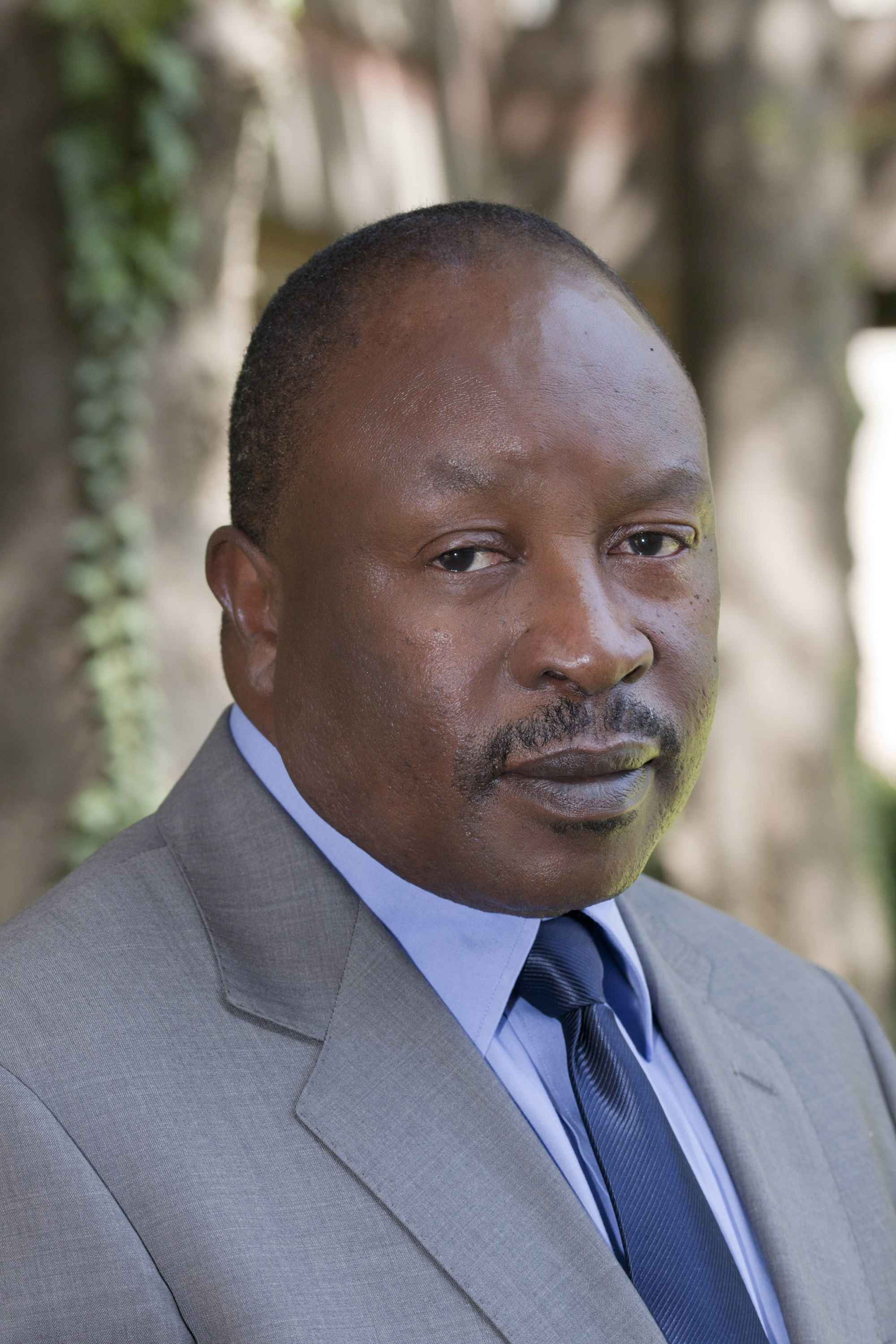
Dr. Kimani Njogu

Dr. Kimani Njogu is a Kenyan linguist known for his study of and advocacy for the Kiswahili language.

== Life and career ==
Njogu was born in Kericho County. After teaching high school, he pursued further education in Swahili studies, gaining his Bachelor of Education degree (First Class) in Literature, Swahili and Education from the University of Nairobi in a constituent college Kenyatta University in 1985 and Masters from University of Nairobi in 1987 in Linguistics and African Languages. Soon after, he joined the faculty of Kenyatta University in the Kiswahili and African Languages department as a Graduate Assistant. In August 1988, he embarked on a scholarship at the department of Linguistics at Yale University, where he completed his PhD in 1994. His dissertation was on dialogue poetry in East Africa. On returning to Kenya, he once again served on the faculty at Kenyatta University before resigning and becoming an independent scholar and public intellectual based in Nairobi. He is the founder chairman of Chama cha Kiswahili cha Taifa, a body dedicated to the promotion of Kiswahili in Kenya. His book, Ufundishaji wa Fasihi: Nadharia na Mbinu, coauthored with Rocha Chimera, won the 2000 Noma Award for Publishing in Africa. He has also written a widely used Kiswahili dictionary.

Njogu is the Founder and Executive Director of Twaweza Communications, a strategic communications firm. In 2012, he was among ten civil society activists given an award for promoting democracy, inclusion and equal opportunity by Ford Foundation to mark its fiftieth year in East Africa.
