= African Nationalist Movement =

Senegalese political party of the 1940s

African Nationalist Movement (French: Mouvement Nationaliste Africain) was a political party in French West Africa, led by Pierre Diagne. It was formed after the fall of the Vichy regime.

In 1946, the Mouvement Nationaliste Africain and the Mouvement Autonomiste Africain (founded by Amadou Bâ earlier that year) formed an alliance with the Parti Socialiste Sénégalais, under the name "Bloc Africain". In September 1947, the Bloc Démocratique Sénégalais was formed, which united three other movements.
