= Motsoalle =

Term for long-term relationships between Basotho women

Motsoalle is the term for socially acceptable, long-term relationships between Basotho women in Lesotho. Motsoalle can be translated from Sesotho loosely as "a very special friend." The word, motsoalle, is used to describe the other woman, as in "she is my motsoalle;" and a motsoalle relationship describes the bond between the two women. Motsoalle relationships are socially sanctioned and have often been celebrated by the people of Lesotho. These women's relationships usually occur alongside otherwise conventional heterosexual marriages and may involve various levels of physical intimacy between the female partners. Motsoalle relationships have, over time, begun to disappear in Lesotho.

== About ==
Motsoalle relationships can first be formed between women during adolescence. The word motsoalle means "special friend." Often, a motsoalle relationship was acknowledged publicly with a ritual feast and with the community fully aware of the women's commitment to one another. One anecdote about a motsoalle relationship describes how one woman, Mpho 'M'atsepho Nthunya, and her husband threw a party in the 1950s to celebrate her motsoalle. Nthunya's account of her relationship with her partner, Malineo, was described to anthropologist K. Limakatso Kendall in a book, Singing Away the Hunger: The Autobiography of an African Woman (1997). Judith Gay is another anthropologist to document these relationships, and she gives evidence that they were once very common. Jason Sullivan describes a form of motsoalle relationships among school girls where it functioned like a type of "puppy love" or mentorship. Other anthropologists who have described motsoalle relationships include Stephen Murray and Will Roscoe.

Motsoalle relationships differ from a western perspective of queer or lesbian relationships. Women in motsoalle relationships "marry men and conform, or appear to conform, to gender expectations." Women in these relationships do not have a different social identity even though they are in a committed relationship with another woman. Women in motsoalle relationships also differ from western ideas of heterosexual female friends. Researcher, William J. Spurlin, stresses that "it is important not to simply translate into English 'M'atsepo Nthunya's use of the Sesotho word motsoalle [...] as lesbian." Nevertheless, Spurlin does state that "it might be possible to place motsoalle relationships on the lesbian continuum to discuss, debate, and imagine them theoretically as possible sites of lesbian existence, given the close emotional and intimate bonds between the women, but with the stipulation that the relationships not be reduced to western understandings of 'lesbian.'"

Part of the difference between a motsoalle relationship and a lesbian one is due to the Sesotho notion of sex. Many Basotho of older generations in Lesotho did not consider an act a sex act if one partner was not male. Therefore, anything women did together was not considered sex, even if it involved erotic components. Because of the social situation in rural Lesotho and the lack of a concept of lesbianism, motsoalle relationships were once widespread, but not seen as an "alternative to heterosexual marriage." Nthunya described it like this: "When a woman loves another woman, you see, she can love her with a whole heart."

As Lesotho became more modernized, those communities exposed to western culture were also more likely to become exposed to homophobia. Kendall hypothesizes that as Western ideas spread, the idea that women could be sexual with one another, coupled with homophobia, began to erase the motsoalle relationships. By the 1980s, the ritual feasts that were once celebrated by the community for motsoalles had vanished. Today, motsoalle relationships have largely disappeared.
