= Rocha Chimera =

Kenyan writer

- Occupation: Writer
- Employer: Kyambogo University

Rocha Chimera is a Kenyan writer. He writes in Kiswahili and is a visiting professor at Kyambogo University in Uganda.

He received the Noma Award in 2000 for Ufundishaji wa Fasihi: Nadharia na Mbinu. Chimera holds a B.Ed. and M.A. from Kenyatta University, and a Ph.D. from Ohio University. He is Professor of Swahili and former chair of the Dept. of Languages and Linguistics at Egerton University. Currently, he is the Dean, School of Humanities and Social Sciences at Pwani University college, Kilifi Kenya.

His published works include Kiswahili: Past, Present and Future Horizons (ISBN 9966-846-35-2) and Ufundishaji wa Fasihi: Nadharia na Mbinu (ISBN 9966-22-157-3) (co-authored with Kimani Njogu) and a play Mnara wawaka moto!: uhalifu (ISBN 9966-846-39-5) .
