= Koyoharu Gotouge Before Demon Slayer: Kimetsu no Yaiba =

Japanese manga series

- Volume cover

吾峠呼世晴短編集 (Gotōge Koyoharu Tanpenshū)
- Genre: Dark fantasy
- Manga
- Written by: Koyoharu Gotouge
- Published by: Shueisha
- English publisher: NA: Viz Media
- Imprint: Jump Comics
- Published: October 4, 2019
- Volumes: 1
- icon

Koyoharu Gotouge Before Demon Slayer: Kimetsu no Yaiba (Note: Japanese: 吾峠呼世晴短編集, Hepburn: Gotōge Koyoharu Tanpenshū; lit. 'Koyoharu Gotouge's Short Stories') is a Japanese anthology manga written and illustrated by Koyoharu Gotouge and published by Shueisha. It features four one-shot stories published between 2013 and 2015.

== Publication ==
Koyoharu Gotouge Before Demon Slayer: Kimetsu no Yaiba features four one-shot stories by Koyoharu Gotouge: Kagarigari (過狩り狩り), launched in 2013; Monju Shirō Kyōdai (文殊史郎兄弟) published in the second issue of Jump Next! in 2014; Rokkotsu-san (肋骨さん) published in Weekly Shōnen Jump in 2014; and Haeniwa no Zigzag (蠅庭のジグザグ) published in Weekly Shōnen Jump in 2015. Shueisha released the collected tankōbon volume on October 4, 2019.

The manga has been licensed for English release in North America by Viz Media, and was released on October 8, 2024. It has also been licensed in Italy by Star Comics, in France by Panini, and in Argentina by Editorial Ivrea.

=== Chapters ===
No.	Original release date	Original ISBN	English release date	English ISBN
1	October 4, 2019	978-4-08-882084-2	October 8, 2024	978-1-9747-4965-2
1. "Overhunter Hunter" (過狩り狩り, Kagarigari); 2. "The Monjushiro Brothers" (文殊史郎兄弟, Monju Shirō Kyōdai); 3. "A Man Called Ribs" (肋骨さん, Rokkotsu-san); 4. "Zigzag from Haeniwa" (蠅庭のジグザグ, Haeniwa no Zigzag)
