= Koyoharu Gotouge =

Japanese manga artist (born 1989)

Koyoharu Gotouge 吾峠 呼世晴
- Born: May 5, 1989 (age 37) Fukuoka Prefecture, Japan
- Area: Manga artist
- Notable works: Demon Slayer: Kimetsu no Yaiba
- Awards: Noma Prize (2020); Tezuka Osamu Cultural Prize (2021); Japan Cartoonists Association Award (2021)

Koyoharu Gotouge (Japanese: 吾峠 呼世晴, Hepburn: Gotōge Koyoharu; born May 5, 1989) is the pen name of a Japanese manga artist, known for the manga series Demon Slayer: Kimetsu no Yaiba (2016–2020). By July 2025, the manga had over 220 million copies in circulation worldwide (including digital copies), making it one of the best-selling manga series of all time.

Gotouge was included as "Phenoms" in Time's annual list of 100 Most Influential People, becoming the first manga artist to receive the achievement.

== Early life ==
Gotouge was born in Fukuoka Prefecture, Japan, on May 5, 1989. The author uses a pen name to maintain anonymity.

== Career ==
In 2013, Gotouge debuted in the 70th Jump Treasure Newcomer Manga Awards with the one-shot work Kagarigari (過狩り狩り). Three more one-shots followed: Monju Shirō Kyōdai (文殊史郎兄弟), published in Jump Next! in 2014; Rokkotsu-san (肋骨さん), published in Weekly Shōnen Jump in 2014; and Haeniwa no Zigzag (蠅庭のジグザグ), published in Weekly Shōnen Jump in 2015.

After Haeniwa no Zigzag failed to become a series, Tatsuhiko Katayama (Gotouge's first editor) suggested starting a series with an "easy-to-understand theme". Gotouge's debut work Kagarigari would serve as a basis for Demon Slayer: Kimetsu no Yaiba. The series was published in Weekly Shōnen Jump from February 15, 2016, to May 18, 2020. It became a success, with over 220 million copies in circulation worldwide (including digital copies) by July 2025, making it one of the best-selling manga series of all time.

In February 2021, Gotouge commented that they wanted to create a science fiction and romantic comedy story for their next project.

== Influences ==
Gotouge has mentioned Hirohiko Araki's JoJo's Bizarre Adventure; Masashi Kishimoto's Naruto; Tite Kubo's Bleach; and Hideaki Sorachi's Gintama as influences on their work.

== Awards and honors ==
In 2020, Gotouge received the 2nd Kodansha's Noma Publishing Culture Award, which honors those who have contributed to "reinventing publishing". Gotouge received the award due to the franchise's sales, which boosted the entire publishing industry from 2019 to 2020. In the same year, Gotouge also won the award for best screenplay/original story at the Tokyo Anime Award Festival.

In February 2021, Gotouge was included as "Phenoms" in Time's annual list of 100 Most Influential People, making them the first manga artist to receive the achievement. In March 2021, Gotouge won the Newcomer Award in the media fine arts category of the 2020 Minister of Education, Culture, Sports, Science and Technology Fine Arts Recommendation Awards. In 2021, Gotouge received the Special Prize of the 25th annual Tezuka Osamu Cultural Prize. In 2021, Gotouge won the Comic division's grand prize of the 50th Japan Cartoonists Association Awards. The 2026 Gold House Gold100 Honorees list included Gotouge in the Entertainment & Media division.

== Works ==
- Kagarigari (過狩り狩り) (2013; one-shot)
- Monju Shirō Kyōdai (文殊史郎兄弟) (2014; one-shot published in Shueisha's Jump Next!)
- Rokkotsu-san (肋骨さん) (2014; one-shot published in Shueisha's Weekly Shōnen Jump)
- Haeniwa no Zigzag (蠅庭のジグザグ) (2015; one-shot published in Shueisha's Weekly Shōnen Jump)
- Demon Slayer: Kimetsu no Yaiba (鬼滅の刃, Kimetsu no Yaiba) (2016–2020; serialized in Shueisha's Weekly Shōnen Jump, and collected in 23 tankōbon volumes)
- Koyoharu Gotouge Before Demon Slayer: Kimetsu no Yaiba (吾峠呼世晴短編集, Gotōge Koyoharu Tanpenshū) (2019; collected volume of Gotouge's four one-shots published by Shueisha)
