= Chenjerai Hove =

Zimbabwean poet (1956–2015)

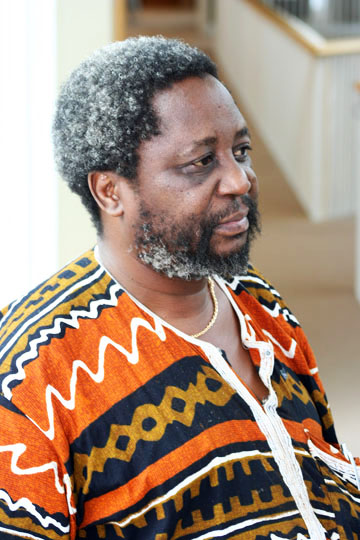
- Hove in 2007
- Born: 9 February 1956; Mazvihwa, near Zvishavane, Rhodesia
- Died: 12 July 2015 (aged 59); Stavanger, Norway
- Education: University of South Africa; University of Zimbabwe
- Occupations: Poet and writer
- Writing career
- Notable awards: 1989 Noma Award for Publishing in Africa

Chenjerai Hove (9 February 1956 – 12 July 2015), was a Zimbabwean poet, novelist and essayist who wrote in both English and Shona. "Modernist in their formal construction, but making extensive use of oral conventions, Hove's novels offer an intense examination of the psychic and social costs - to the rural population, especially, of the war of liberation in Zimbabwe." He died on 12 July 2015 while living in exile in Norway, with his death attributed to liver failure.

== Life ==
The son of a local chief Chenjerai Hove was born in Mazvihwa, near Zvishavane, in what was then Rhodesia. He attended school at Kutama College and Marist Brothers Dete, in the Hwange district of Zimbabwe. After studying in Gweru, he became a teacher and then took degrees at the University of South Africa and the University of Zimbabwe. He also worked as a journalist, and contributed to the anthology And Now the Poets Speak. He published regularly in The Zimbabwean, an opposition newspaper founded in 2005.

A critic of the policies of the Mugabe government, Hove was living in exile at the time of his death as a fellow at the House of Culture in Stavanger, Norway, as part of the International Cities of Refuge Network (ICORN). Prior to this, he held visiting positions at Lewis and Clark College and Brown University; he was also once a poet-in-residence in Miami.

Chenjerai Hove's work was translated into several languages (including Japanese, German, and Dutch). He won several awards over the course of his career, including the 1989 Noma Award for Publishing in Africa.

== Publications ==
Chenjerai Hove published numerous novels, poetry anthologies and collections of essays and reflections. His publications include:

- And Now the Poets Speak (co-editor; poetry), 1981
- Up In Arms (poetry), Harare: Zimbabwe Publishing House, 1982
- Red Hills of Home (poetry), 1984; Gweru: Mambo Press, 1985.
- Bones (novel), Harare: Baobab Books, 1988; Heineman International AWS, 1989. ISBN 0-435-90576-7
- Shadows (novel), Harare: Baobab Books, 1991; Heinemann International Literature and Textbooks, 1992. ISBN 0-435-90591-0
- Shebeen Tales: Messages from Harare (journalistic essays), Harare: Baobab Books/London: Serif, 1994
- Rainbows in the Dust (poetry), 1997
- Guardians of the Soil (cultural reflections by Zimbabwe's elders), 1997. ISBN 0-908311-88-5
- Ancestors (novel), 1997. ISBN 0-330-34490-0
- Desperately Seeking Europe (co-author; essays on European identity), 2003
- Palaver Finish, essays on politics and life in Zimbabwe, 2003
- Blind Moon (poetry), 2004. ISBN 1-77922-019-7
- The Keys of Ramb (children's story), 2004

== Honours and awards ==
- 1983 Special Commendations for the Noma Award for Publishing in Africa, for Up in Arms
- 1984 Inaugural President, Zimbabwe Writers Union
- 1988 Winner, Zimbabwe Literary Award, for Bones
- 1989 Winner, Noma Award for Publishing In Africa, for Bones
- 1990 Founding Board Member, Zimbabwe Human Rights Association (Zimrights)
- 1991–94 Writer-in-Residence, University of Zimbabwe, Zimbabwe
- 1994 Visiting Professor, Lewis and Clark College, Portland, Oregon, USA
- 1995 Guest Writer, Yorkshire and Humberside Arts and Leeds University, UK
- 1996 Guest Writer, Heinrich Böll Foundation, Germany
- 1998 Second Prize, Zimbabwe Literary Award, for Ancestors
- 2001 German Africa Prize for literary contribution to freedom of expression
- 2007-08 International Writers Project Fellow, Brown University
