= African Autonomist Movement =

Senegalese political party of the 1940s

African Autonomist Movement (in French: Mouvement Autonomiste Africain; MAA) was a political party in French West Africa, led by Amadou Bâ (1892–1967). It was formed in Dakar, Senegal, on 17 August 1946, after the fall of the Vichy regime, but did not last long.

Later in 1946, the Mouvement Nationaliste Africain and the MAA formed an alliance with the Parti Socialiste Sénégalais, under the name "Bloc Africain". In September 1947, the Bloc Démocratique Sénégalais was formed, which united three other movements.
