= Mariama Bâ =

Senegalese novelist (1929–1981)

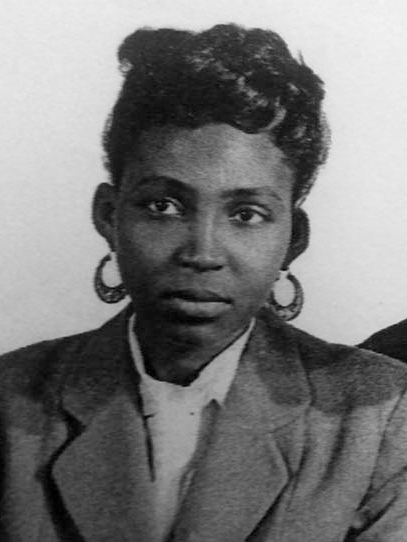
- Mariama Bâ in 1958
- Born: 17 April 1929; Dakar, Senegal
- Died: 17 August 1981 (aged 52); Dakar, Senegal
- Occupation: Author
- Children: 9
- Writing career
- Language: French
- Genre: novel
- Notable work: So Long a Letter (Une si longue lettre)

Mariama Bâ (April 17, 1929 – August 17, 1981) was a Senegalese author and feminist. Her two French-language novels have been translated into more than a dozen languages each. Born in Dakar, Senegal, she was raised a Muslim.

Her frustration with the fate of African women is expressed in her first novel, Une si longue lettre (1979; translated into English as So Long a Letter). In this semi-autobiographical epistolary work, Bâ depicts the sorrow and resignation of a widow who must share the work of mourning with her late husband's second, younger wife. The novel was awarded the first Noma Award for Publishing in Africa in 1980.

== Biography ==
=== Early years and education ===
Bâ was born in Dakar, Senegal, in 1929, into an educated and affluent Senegalese family of Lebu ethnicity. Her mother, Fatou Kiné Gaye, died when Mariama was 4 years of age. Her father, Amadou Bâ, founded the separatist African Autonomist Movement in 1946. He was the Minister of Health for Senegal in 1956 while her paternal grandfather, Sarakholé, worked as an interpreter for French officials during the French occupation regime. After her mother's death, Bâ was primarily raised by her maternal grandparents, who emphasized conservative Muslim values.

Bâ's father enrolled her in a French-language Koranic school located in Dakar to study alongside Berthe Maubert, a woman after whom the school was later renamed. Bâ studied the Koran in school with a well-known Islamic cleric in Dakar. At age 14, she gained admission to École Normale de Rufisque, a French teacher-training school, by scoring the highest in a competition held in all of French West Africa. Her grandparents were hesitant to allow her to pursue further education due to their belief that women in Senegal did not need to be educated. At the school, Bâ was taught by Germaine Le Goff. She described the transformative power of education in her later writing and advocacy.

In 1947, when she was 18 years old, Bâ graduated and began her teaching career. Her first experience was teaching at the School of Medicine in Dakar. Bâ went on to teach at multiple institutions for 12 years. She later left teaching and became a Senegalese Regional Inspectorate of Teaching due to her deteriorating health.

=== Personal life and later years ===
Bâ was married to Obèye Diop, a member of the Senegalese parliament. Their marriage, which produced nine children, eventually ended in divorce. Bâ's experiences within this union deeply influenced her writing, particularly her critique of gender roles and marital expectations in postcolonial Senegal. Her observations of the emotional and social impact of polygamy and unequal power within marriage provided the foundation for her first novel, So Long a Letter, which portrays the struggles of educated women navigating tradition and modernity. Her personal experiences, including marriage, motherhood, and divorce, informed her nuanced understanding of the social and emotional challenges that women faced.

Bâ died of lung cancer on August 17, 1981. Her death came before the publication of her second novel, Un Chant écarlate (Scarlet Song). This novel explores the relationship between two individuals from different ethnic and cultural backgrounds, who struggle with the pressures of their tradition, societal expectations, and prejudice. Through this work, Bâ continued her critique of patriarchal and cultural constraints, symbolising the hardships people, especially women, faced between modernity and tradition in postcolonial African society.

== Work ==
=== So Long a Letter ===
In 1980, Une si longue lettre, translated as So Long a Letter, was awarded the first Noma Award for Publishing in Africa. In this book, Bâ recognized the immense contributions African women have made and continue to make in the building of their societies. The book was internationally successful. It was particularly successful in Senegal, which had only recently become independent from French colonial rule.

The book is written in the form of a letter, or a diary, from a widow, Ramatoulaye, to her childhood girlfriend, Aissatou, who lives in the United States. Nafissatou Niang Diallo (1941–1982), who started her works in the 1970s, was a mirror for Mariama Bâ, whose leading role was a strong-minded character. Moreover, she found support, friendship and values from female confidence, unity and harmony. The discriminatory use of power forces Ramatoulaye to deal with its consequences. This discriminatory power is what is in the novel a form of male domination coming from society's construction of a patriarchal ideology. Because Ramatoulaye is a woman, she has little power in determining her own destiny, but Aissatou rejects this notion and chooses her own life without being denied a life of her own by her husband Mawdo.

So Long a Letter is often identified as an early feminist text, resonating with themes that women navigate globally. This is reflected through the characterization of Ramatoulaye, who undergoes a personal transformation shaped by the broader movement of women's liberation struggles. Some scholars draw on historical and contemporary contexts to interpret key events within the novel's timeline. Published in 1970s Senegal, the novel is situated within a period marked by significant socio-political developments, including the passage of the Family Code—which expanded women's rights but faced religious resistance—the resurgence of Islamic fundamentalism, and the pressures of rapid Westernization and modernization. Beyond this immediate context, Bâ highlights the social realities of Senegalese women in the 1970s, addressing themes such as polygamy, motherhood, and the challenging of stereotypes.

Within Bâ's work, she draws attention to contradictory ideals arising from the social dynamics of colonial and post-colonial societies. In So Long a Letter, Bâ focuses on the impacts of patriarchy while portraying the complexities faced by young people growing up under conflicting social expectations. In both of her novels, Bâ comments on African youth and their navigation of intergenerational conflict in a post-colonial era. Scholars note that these characters do not seek to reject their cultures outright but instead attempt to synthesize and understand multiple social realities that shape their lives. These themes reflect Bâ's own early life experiences, including the tension between her French colonial education and the expectation that she honor African cultural identity.

Bâ's work is also studied as early feminist literature within an African context. By depicting women living in intersecting realities of gender, caste, and colonialism, she illustrates how African women experience compounded forms of oppression. As Bâ centers the lives of African women in ways often overlooked historically, her novel contributes to increased visibility for women marginalized within patriarchal systems. Bâ writes, "as women we must work for our own future, we must overthrow the status quo which harms us and we must no longer submit to it". So Long a Letter follows this trajectory by serving as a framework for identity reclamation and by honoring women whose voices have been diminished within male-dominated structures.

Bâ was a vanguard of intersectionality and a Muslim feminist. Her work contributes to a comprehensive framework for understanding the oppression of women across various forms of discrimination and lived experiences. This epistolary is also used as a pedagogical tool to instill multicultural tolerance. So Long a Letter has been translated into many languages and remains widely taught in schools, particularly in West Africa.

The novel functions as a visionary manifesto that challenges the common assumption that Black feminism is a monolithic movement. Her pencraft book portrayed the myriads of nuances in feminism combat. "One of the leading artists in this category of new female literary figures is the late Senegalese novelist, Mariama Ba." Mbye Baboucar Cham.

Despite the patriarchal system within which the characters live, Bâ highlights differences in schools of thought and positionalities among African women. Although both Ramatoulaye and Aïssatou are Muslim women, Aïssatou adheres to the primacy of love rather than accepting cultural or religious justifications for polygamy. As she declares: "I will not yield to it. I cannot accept what you are offering me today in place of the happiness we once had. You want to draw a line between heartfelt love and physical love. I say that there can be no union of bodies without the heart's acceptance, however little that may be."

Bâ advocates for women's rights while avoiding the approach of more radical activists who openly criticize Islam. Ramatoulaye makes a conscious decision to remain in her marriage without overt coercion. Her decision is guided by her faith and her resilience as a woman: "I remained. I chose to remain. What could I do? A woman must endure." She further reflects, "God ordained it thus. He tests us but does not abandon us."

This divergence of opinion regarding polygamy symbolizes the cultural and religious diversity among Muslim women. As Nana Wilson-Tagoe observes, "the inscription of a woman's sphere and the meaning of female difference may deviate from culture to culture. We belong here too."

Bâ has been discussed as a pioneer in Islamic feminism and more broadly as a foundational figure in gender studies.

I situate my reading of Ramatoulaye's expression of Islamic feminism within an African and Islamic feminist reading and further position these within the cultural context of the practice of Islam in Senegal. By her 'strategic self-positioning', as defined by Islamic feminist Miriam Cooke, among others, within a small group of Senegalese Muslims – locally known as ibadu Muslims – Ramatoulaye succeeds in enacting Islamic feminism in her spiritual persistence for a strict adherence to the Qur'an and in her resistance to the temptation to expand the Islamic precepts of her faith. Shirin Edwin

=== Scarlet Song ===
Scarlet Song (1981) also gained international attention. This book deals with the critically urgent need for women to create "empowered" spaces for themselves, meaning, women need to create a space where they are not considered the "weaker sex". Scarlet Song is about a marriage between a European woman and an African man. Mireille, whose father is a French diplomat, marries Ousmane, son of a poor Senegalese Muslim family. Moving back from Paris to Senegal, Ousmane once again adopts his traditions and customs. But, as an occidental, Mireille cannot handle this kind of life, especially when Ousmane takes a second wife. However, Senegal has a polygamous society and in their religion it is acceptable but Mireille did not accept it. She suffers the marriage. Most notably, the book criticizes the tyranny of tradition and expounds upon the despair of cross-cultural marriages.

Scarlet Song has been interpreted as an exploration of marital conflict and cultural tension. The couple's relationship is marked by a dichotomy between individualism and collectivism, presenting their struggles as a commentary on the interplay between personal desires and cultural expectations. For instance, the young character Mireille challenges tradition by pursuing a marriage based on love, defying customary norms. Themes of intergenerational continuity, tradition, and cultural change are central to this novel as well.

A recurring theme in Bâ's work is the influence of feminist thought within an African framework. Some scholars observe that the characters in Scarlet Song attribute patriarchal oppression primarily to men; however, others emphasize the significance of relationships among women in revealing the complexities of patriarchal systems. By examining how female subordination is sustained within African societies, Bâ's work recenters women and their interpersonal relationships. Scholars note that characters such as Yaye Khady, Ouleymatou, and Mireille each occupy patriarchal social structures that shape their interactions and reinforce hierarchy. Additional scholarship examines the mixed-race marriage depicted in the novel as a commentary on unresolved sociocultural tensions in post-colonial Africa. The conflicts that arise—both structural and interpersonal—are framed within a colonial legacy. Through this framework, Scarlet Song portrays cultural intolerance, rivalries among women, and the broader challenges of navigating life in a fractured post-colonial society.

=== La Fonction politique des littératures africaines écrites ===
In this article from 1981, Mariama Bâ states that every African woman should be proud of her strength and accomplishments. She believes that each woman contributes to Africa's development and participates in Africa's growth.

== Legacy ==
Columbia University Libraries included So Long a Letter as one of the 20th century's 100 best books about Africa.

A biography of Bâ was published in Dakar in 2007: Mariama Bâ ou les allées d'un destin by her daughter, Mame Coumba Ndiaye.

=== Mariama Bâ Boarding School (Maison d'Education Mariama Bâ) ===
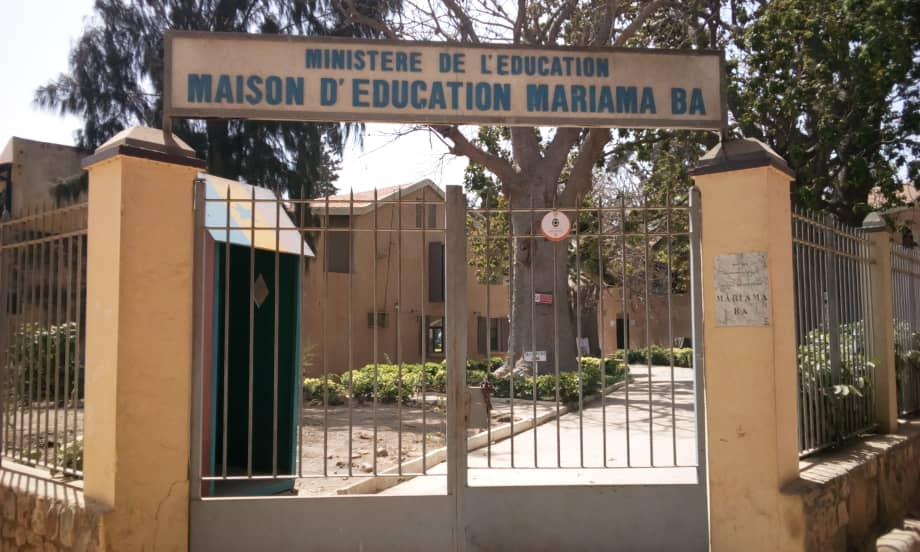
School named after Mariama Ba

Following her death in 1981, Mariama Bâ's legacy was honored through the founding of the Maison d'Éducation Mariama Bâ, an elite all-girls boarding school located on Gorée Island, Senegal. The school was established in 1977 by the Senegalese government and named in her honor by then-President Léopold Sédar Senghor, who recognized Bâ's influence as both an educator and advocate for women's advancement. The institution was created to provide gifted young women with access to a rigorous education that combined academic excellence with civic responsibility. Today, the Maison d'Éducation Mariama Bâ remains one of Senegal's most prestigious schools, continuing Bâ's vision of empowering women through education and leadership.

== Bibliography ==
- Bâ, Mariama (1979). Une si longue lettre [So Long a Letter] (in French). Dakar: Les Nouvelles Éditions Africaines. Republished in French by Serpent à plumes, Paris, 2001. Translated by Modupé Bodé-Thomas as So Long a Letter and published by Heinemann, 1981; Virago, 1982; and Waveland Press, 2012. Abridged in Daughters of Africa, edited by Margaret Busby, 1992.
- Bâ, Mariama (1981). Un Chant écarlate (in French). Dakar: Les Nouvelles Éditions Africaines. Republished as Bâ, Mariama (2022). Un Chant écarlate (in French). Les Prouesses, Forcalquier (Alpes-de-Haute-Provence). ISBN 9782493324009. OCLC 1319657165. Translated as Bâ, Mariama (1985). Scarlet Song. Translated by Blair, Dorothy S. Harlow: Longman. OCLC 1390788798. The first edition of the translation was published in 1981.
- Bâ, Mariama (1981). "La fonction politique des littératures africaines écrites". Écriture Française dans le monde (in French). 5 (3): 3–7.
  - Mbye Cham. 1994. The female condition in Africa: A literary exploration by Mariama Ba. A current bibliography on African Affairs. Journals Sagepub.com. This is an article reviewed by a global academic publisher. The author was a professor in Higher Education.
