= Amadou Bâ (politician, born 1892) =

Senegalese politician (1892–1967)

Minister of Health and Population of Senegal
- In office 20 May 1957 – 16 June 1958
- Preceded by: Office established
- Succeeded by: Édouard Diatta

Personal details
- Born: 11 December 1892 Saint-Louis
- Died: 6 March 1967 (aged 74) Dakar

Amadou Bâ (11 December 1892 – 6 March 1967), also known as Doudou Ba, was a Senegalese politician, adjunct to the mayor of Dakar and minister.

== Biography ==
In the 1920s, Amadou Bâ was the secretary of the writer Massyla Diop, who was the founding-editor of the journals Le Sénégal moderne (Modern Senegal) and Revue africaine littéraire et artistique (African Literary and Artistic Review), with Marcel Sableau.

On 17 August 1946, Bâ founded an ephemeral political party, the African Autonomist Movement (MAA) in Dakar.

When Pierre Lami and Mamadou Dia were president and vice-president of the Council of Government of the Territory of Senegal, Bâ was named minister of health and population in the government of 20 May 1957, but he resigned on 16 June 1958 and was replaced by Édouard Diatta.

He was the father of the writer Mariama Bâ and magistrate Mody Bâ.

== Bibliography ==
- Babacar Ndiaye and Waly Ndiaye, Présidents et ministres de la République du Sénégal, Dakar, 2006 (2nd edn), p. 51.
