= Noma Prize =

Japanese literary awards

The Noma Prizes were established by Shoichi Noma, or in his honor. More than one award is conventionally identified as the Noma Prize. Noma was the former head of Kodansha, the Japanese publishing and bookselling company. Kodansha is Japan's largest publisher of literature and manga.

== Noma Literary Prizes ==
Noma Prizes include four literary prizes for books published in Japan.

- Noma Literary Prize

The Noma Literary Prize (Noma Bungei Shō) was established in 1941 by the Noma Service Association (Noma Hōkō Kai) in accordance with the last wishes of Seiji Noma (1878-1938), founder and first president of the Kōdansha publishing company. The Noma Literary Prize has been awarded annually to an outstanding new work published in Japan between October and the following September. The Noma Prize includes a commemorative plaque and a cash award of 3 million yen.

- Noma Literary New Face Prize

The Noma Literary New Face Prize (Noma Bungei Shinjin Shō) was established in 1979.

- Noma Children's Literature Prize

The Noma Children's Literature Prize (Noma Jidō Bungei Shō) was established in 1963.

- Noma Children's Literature New Face Prize

The Noma Children's Literature New Face Prize (Noma Jidō Bungei Shinjin Shō) was established in 1963.

== Noma Literacy Prize ==
The Noma Literacy Prize is a UNESCO award. It is given to the group or individual who has done most to combat illiteracy. It was founded in 1980 by Shoichi Noma, the president of the publishing firm.

== Noma Award for the Translation of Japanese Literature ==
The Noma Award for the Translation of Japanese Literature is awarded annually for new translations of modern Japanese literature into any language. It was founded in 1990.

== Noma Award for Publishing in Africa ==
The Noma Award for Publishing in Africa is sponsored by Kodansha and it is named honor of the company's former president, Shoichi Noma. Its first honoree in 1980 was Mariama Bâ for Une Si Longue Lettre (So Long a Letter).

== Noma-Reischauer Prize in Japanese Studies ==
The Noma Reischauer Prize was established at Harvard University to honor the memory of Prof. Edwin O. Reischauer and to assist in the advancement of Japanese Studies in the United States, Japan, and elsewhere. The Prize was made possible with the support of Kodansha. The prizes are awarded annually for the best essays written by Harvard students writing about a Japan-related subject.

== Noma Concours for Picture Book Illustrations ==
The Noma Concours for Picture Book Illustrations (Japanese: 野間国際絵本原画コンクール) was an annual competition organised by the Asia/Pacific Cultural Centre for UNESCO (ACCU) supported by the Noma International Book Development Fund from 1978 to 2008. It was named after Shoichi Noma, the fourth president of the Japanese family-run publishing house Kodansha Ltd.

== See also ==
- List of Japanese literary awards
