= So Long a Letter =

Book by Mariama Bâ

- Author: Mariama Bâ
- Original title: Une si longue lettre
- Language: French
- Genre: Novel
- Published: 1979 (Les Nouvelles Éditions Africaines du Sénégal)
- Publication place: Senegal
- Media type: Print (hardback & paperback)
- Pages: 90 pp (hardback edition)
- ISBN: 978-2266-02-7 (hardback edition)
- OCLC: 9668743

So Long a Letter (French: Une si longue lettre) is a semi-autobiographical epistolary novel originally written in French by the Senegalese writer Mariama Bâ. It was her first novel. Its theme is the condition of women in Western African society.

As the novel begins, Ramatoulaye Fall is beginning a letter to her lifelong friend Aissatou Bâ. The occasion for writing is Ramatoulaye's recent widowhood. As she gives her friend the details of her husband's death, she recounts the major events in their lives.

The novel is often used in literature classes focusing on women's roles in post-colonial Africa. It won the first Noma Award for Publishing in Africa in 1980.

== Plot summary ==
So Long a Letter is written as a series of entries in a long letter from the main character Ramatoulaye Fall to her best friend Aissatou following the sudden death from heart attack of Ramatoulaye's husband Modou Fall. The letter is written while Ramatoulaye is going through 'Iddah, a four month and ten day mourning process that widow of the Muslim Senegalese culture must follow. Ramatoulaye begins by recalling and describing the emotions that flooded her during the first few days after her husband's death and speaks in detail about how he lost his life. She transitions the tone and time by discussing the life she had with her husband, from the beginning of their relationship to his betrayal of a thirty year marriage by secretly marrying his daughter's school best friend to the life he had with his second wife. Throughout this short and compelling novel, Ramatoulaye details to Aissatou, who experienced a similar but different marital situation, how she emotionally dealt with and was changed by his betrayal, his death, and by being a single mother of many.

== Analysis ==
The letter covered many topics such as polygamy, Senegalese class hierarchy, and religion, so it was difficult to place the genre of the book. Some called it a novel while others referred to Bâ's work as a letter.

Author and professor Uzoma Esonwanne interpreted the book as a challenge to colonialism while also acknowledging colonial practices. The character Ramatoulaye's insistence on being heard and providing inside commentary on the downside of polygamy, made Esonwanne question the part gender plays in this new era of the world.

Author and Yale professor Christopher L. Miller found Bâ's So Long a Letter more journal-like, in that it held her written letter with no one answering back.

Literary scholar Abiola Irele called it "the most deeply felt presentation of the female condition in African fiction".

== Reception ==
The letter was used in the western hemisphere to study how strong bonds women formed influenced them. Ramatoulaye and Aissatou's friendship helped them break away from social norms, gaining social and political respect without a male.

The letter was also used to understand women's views on polygamy. Some women in Senegal saw fault in polygamy and fought against it. Aissatou leaves her husband for practising polygamy and Ramatoulaye says no to marriage to another man.

The author was praised for her involvement in expanding African literature as well as feminism through personal accounts of her life.

== Themes ==
So Long a Letter deals with multiple themes, which includes the life of women in Senegal during the 1970s, family and community life, Islam and polygamy, and death rituals.

The letters explore the tensions between Ramatoulaye's feminist values (developed largely as a consequence of her French colonial education) and her religion, which is often used a means of justifying the mistreatment of women like herself. However, Ramatoulaye attributes the mistreatment of women by men to the misinterpretation and misappropriation of Islamic scriptures, rather than suggesting that they are inherently sexist.

== Characters ==
- Ramatoulaye: The widowed Senegalese woman who, after 30 years of marriage and 12 children, narrates the story of her psychological abandonment by her husband, who marries a second wife. Ramatoulaye physically distances herself from Modou who dies four years after this second marriage. Ramatoulaye turns down two other marriage proposals, including that of Daouda Dieng. She is well educated and teaches at a university. After her husband's second marriage, she must work a lot, since her husband cuts off family ties and financial support.
- Modou: The husband of Ramatoulaye and of Binetou. He was well educated, handsome, and charming. For his own selfish desires, he marries Binetou and cuts ties with his 12 children and first wife, Ramatoulaye. He later dies of a heart attack.
- Mawdo: Ex-husband of Aïssatou. After being pressured by his mother Nabou, Mawdo follows tradition of polygamy and marries a young girl also named Nabou, who is his first cousin. After his marriage with Nabou, Aïssatou (his first wife) divorces him. He is Modou's long-time friend and a doctor.
- Aïssatou: Ramatoulaye's best friend, to whom the letters are addressed. She divorced Mawdo because she did not believe in polygamy; she left him a letter explaining her actions and never returned. She takes care of herself well and bought Ramatoulaye a car, which made life much easier for Ramatoulaye. Her divorce is symbolic because it represents a new life for her. She later leaves Senegal with her four sons and moves to the United States to start over. She succeeds in making a new life for herself.
- Aïssatou: Ramatoulaye and Modou's daughter, who is named after her best friend. She enters into a relationship with a boy named Ibrahim Sall, whom she calls "Iba," a poor student who impregnates her. They claim to love each other and plan their marriage after their studies. Since she is still a high school student, Iba's mother will take care of the child until she graduates.
- Ibrahima Sall: A student of law who impregnates Aissatou, Ramatoulaye's daughter. He is tall, respectful, well-dressed, and punctual. Aïssatou is his first and possibly only love, he says. He will marry Aïssatou if Ramatoulaye will allow it.
- Binetou: A young girl around Daba's age who marries her "sugar daddy" (Modou) because her mother, who was poor, wanted to live the high life and climb the social ladder. Binetou became an outcast who never quite fit in with the younger couples or the mature adults.
- Daouda Dieng: A suitor of Ramatoulaye prior to her marriage with Modou who proposes to Ramatoulaye after her husband dies, but is turned down.
- Daba: Ramatoulaye's and Modou's daughter. She is married and the eldest child. She is disgusted by her father's choice to take a second wife, especially one of her closest friends.
- Arame, Yacine, and Dieynaba: Known as "the trio." They are Ramatoulaye's daughters. They smoke, drink, party, and wear pants instead of ladylike dresses. They represent the next modernized generation after liberation from France.
- Alioune and Malick: Ramatoulaye's young boys who play ball in the streets because they claim to have no space to play in a compound. They get hit by a motorcyclist that they drag home with the intention of having their mother avenge them. They are disappointed to find that Ramatoulaye does not get mad at the cyclist, but at the boys because they were careless to play in the streets. This shows Ramatoulaye's wisdom in raising her children in the right way.
- Ousmane and Oumar: Young sons of Ramatoulaye. They represent the idea that a father figure would be beneficial for Ramatoulaye's children since several of them are still so young.
- Farmata: The griot woman who is Ramatoulaye's neighbour and childhood friend. She noses into Ramatoulaye's business and is the one to point out Aissatou's pregnancy to Ramatoulaye. She represents a "Spirit of Wisdom", but doesn't always give the best advice. Ramatoulaye and her become friends despite caste barriers.
- Jacqueline Diack: Protestant wife of Samba Diack, a fellow doctor like Mawdo Bâ. Her husband's openly treacherous tendencies lead her to depression.
- Little Nabou: Raised by Mawdo's mother, Grande Nabou. She is brought up under very traditional Muslim customs and becomes a midwife. She later marries Mawdo Bâ to be his second wife. She is the niece of Grande Nabou and the first cousin of Mawdo Bâ.
- Grande Nabou: Mawdo Bâ's mother, who influences him to marry Little Nabou. She dislikes Aïssatou since she comes from a working-class family and her father is a jewelry maker. Grande Nabou is a princess from a royal family in Senegal and is very conservative in her views and traditions.
- Mawdo Fall: He is the first son of Ranatoulaye and Modu. Gifted with intelligence, he is extremely brilliant. He always takes first position in class, after every test and exams, until his philosophy teacher at the Blaise Diagne Secondary School decides to racially discriminate against him intellectually because of a white boy, by the name of Jean Claude, by knocking off one or two marks from his grade for every single mistake he makes
